= Czechoslovakia at the 1984 Winter Olympics =

- IOC code: TCH
- NOC: Czechoslovak Olympic Committee

in Sarajevo
- Competitors: 50 (38 men, 12 women) in 8 sports
- Flag bearer: Jiří Králík (ice hockey)
- Medals Ranked 12th: Gold 0 Silver 2 Bronze 4 Total 6

Winter Olympics appearances (overview)
- 1924; 1928; 1932; 1936; 1948; 1952; 1956; 1960; 1964; 1968; 1972; 1976; 1980; 1984; 1988; 1992

Other related appearances
- Czech Republic (1994–pres.); Slovakia (1994–pres.)

Czechoslovakia competed at the 1984 Winter Olympics in Sarajevo, Yugoslavia.

== Medalists ==
Medal	Name	Sport	Event	Date
Silver	Květa Jeriová; Blanka Paulů; Gabriela Svobodová; Dagmar Švubová	Cross-country skiing	Women's 4 x 5 km relay	15 February
Silver	Czechoslovakia men's national ice hockey team: Jaroslav Benák; Vladimír Caldr; František Černík; Miloslav Hořava; Jiří Hrdina; Milan Chalupa; Arnold Kadlec; Jaroslav Korbela; Jiří Králík; Vladimír Kýhos; Jiří Lála; Igor Liba; Vincent Lukáč; Dušan Pašek; Pavel Richter; Dárius Rusnák; Vladimír Růžička; Radoslav Svoboda; Jaromír Šindel; Eduard Uvíra	Ice hockey	Men's tournament	19 February
Bronze	Květa Jeriová	Cross-country skiing	Women's 5 km	12 February
Bronze	Olga Charvátová	Alpine skiing	Women's downhill	16 February
Bronze	Jozef Sabovčík	Figure skating	Men's singles	16 February
Bronze	Pavel Ploc	Ski jumping	Large hill individual	18 February

== Alpine skiing ==
Women

Athlete	Event	Race 1		Race 2		Total	
Athlete	Event	Time	Rank	Time	Rank	Time	Rank
Ivana Valešová	Downhill					1:16.43	24
Jana Šoltýsová-Gantnerová	Downhill					1:14.14	5
Olga Charvátová	Downhill					1:13.53	3rd place, bronze medalist(s)
Jana Šoltýsová-Gantnerová	Giant Slalom	1:13.92	40	DNF	–	DNF	–
Alexandra Mařasová	Giant Slalom	1:12.59	37	1:13.78	21	2:26.37	26
Ivana Valešová	Giant Slalom	1:12.17	31	1:14.54	29	2:26.71	28
Olga Charvátová	Giant Slalom	1:09.94	6	1:12.63	10	2:22.57	8
Ivana Valešová	Slalom	DNF	–	–	–	DNF	–
Alexandra Mařasová	Slalom	DNF	–	–	–	DNF	–
Olga Charvátová	Slalom	49.65	12	49.01	9	1:38.66	10

== Biathlon ==
Men

Event	Athlete	Misses ^{1}	Time	Rank
10 km Sprint	Zdeněk Hák	3	33:19.3	23
10 km Sprint	Vítězslav Jureček	0	32:26.5	13
10 km Sprint	Jan Matouš	3	32:10.5	9

Event	Athlete	Time	Penalties	Adjusted time ^{2}	Rank
20 km	Jaromír Šimůnek	1'15:04.3	6	1'21:04.3	25
20 km	Zdeněk Hák	1'13:05.5	6	1'19:05.5	15
20 km	Jan Matouš	1'11:39.0	5	1'16:39.0	10

Men's 4 x 7.5 km relay

Athletes	Race		
Athletes	Misses ^{1}	Time	Rank
Jaromír Šimůnek; Zdeněk Hák; Peter Zelinka; Jan Matouš	4	1'42:40.5	6

^{1} A penalty loop of 150 metres had to be skied per missed target.
^{2} One minute added per missed target.

== Cross-country skiing ==
Men

Event	Athlete	Race	
Event	Athlete	Time	Rank
15 km	Pavel Benc	46:03.8	46
15 km	Miloš Bečvář	44:00.8	29
30 km	Pavel Benc	1'36:30.3	34
30 km	Miloš Bečvář	1'34:27.2	27
50 km	Miloš Bečvář	2'25:23.7	23

Women

Event	Athlete	Race	
Event	Athlete	Time	Rank
5 km	Dagmar Palečková-Švubová	18:15.3	20
5 km	Gabriela Svobodová-Sekajová	17:59.8	15
5 km	Blanka Paulů	17:56.6	13
5 km	Květa Jeriová	17:18.3	3rd place, bronze medalist(s)
10 km	Anna Pasiárová	34:35.9	27
10 km	Gabriela Svobodová-Sekajová	33:29.1	14
10 km	Blanka Paulů	33:07.8	13
10 km	Květa Jeriová	32:58.7	10
20 km	Viera Klimková	1'06:59.9	24
20 km	Anna Pasiárová	1'05:35.7	16
20 km	Květa Jeriová	1'04:56.2	12
20 km	Blanka Paulů	1'03:16.9	4

Women's 4 × 5 km relay

Athletes	Race	
Athletes	Time	Rank
Dagmar Palečková-Švubová; Blanka Paulů; Gabriela Svobodová-Sekajová; Květa Jeriová	1'07:34.7	2nd place, silver medalist(s)

== Figure skating ==
Men

Athlete	CF	SP	FS	TFP	Rank
Jozef Sabovčík	4	5	3	7.4	3rd place, bronze medalist(s)

Ice Dancing

Athletes	CD	OD	FD	TFP	Rank
Jindra Hola; Karol Foltan	14	12	13	25.8	13

== Ice hockey ==
=== Group B ===
Top two teams (shaded ones) advanced to the medal round.

Team	Pld	W	L	T	GF	GA	Pts
Czechoslovakia	5	5	0	0	38	7	10
Canada	5	4	1	0	24	10	8
Finland	5	2	2	1	27	19	5
United States	5	1	2	2	16	17	4
Austria	5	1	4	0	13	37	2
Norway	5	0	4	1	15	43	1

- Czechoslovakia 10–4 Norway
- Czechoslovakia 4–1 USA
- Czechoslovakia 13–0 Austria
- Czechoslovakia 7–2 Finland
- Czechoslovakia 4–0 Canada

=== Medal round ===
Team	Pld	W	L	T	GF	GA	Pts
Soviet Union	3	3	0	0	16	1	6
Czechoslovakia (silver)	3	2	1	0	6	2	4
Sweden	3	1	2	0	3	12	2
Canada	3	0	3	0	0	10	0

- Czechoslovakia 2–0 Sweden
- USSR 2–0 Czechoslovakia

Carried over group match:

- Czechoslovakia 4–0 Canada

=== Leading scorers ===
Rk	Team	GP	G	A	Pts
4th	Darius Rusnák	7	4	7	11
8th	Vladimír Růžička	7	4	6	10
8th	Jiří Hrdina	7	4	6	10
10th	Vincent Lukáč	7	4	5	9

Silver:
Jaroslav Benák
Vladimír Caldr
František Černík
Miloslav Hořava
Jiří Hrdina
Arnold Kadlec
Jaroslav Korbela
Jiří Králík
Vladimír Kýhos
Jiří Lála
Igor Liba
Vincent Lukáč
Dušan Pašek
Pavel Richter
Darius Rusnák
Vladimír Růžička
Jaromír Šindel
Radoslav Svoboda
Eduard Uvíra

== Luge ==
Men

Athlete	Run 1		Run 2		Run 3		Run 4		Total	
Athlete	Time	Rank	Time	Rank	Time	Rank	Time	Rank	Time	Rank
Stanislav Ptáčník	48.133	24	47.746	21	47.706	19	48.060	24	3:11.645	23
Martin Förster	47.691	20	47.718	20	47.756	20	47.528	19	3:10.693	18

(Men's) Doubles

Athletes	Run 1		Run 2		Total	
Athletes	Time	Rank	Time	Rank	Time	Rank
Stanislav Ptáčník; Martin Förster	44.361	14	43.562	14	1:27.923	14

Women

Athlete	Run 1		Run 2		Run 3		Run 4		Total	
Athlete	Time	Rank	Time	Rank	Time	Rank	Time	Rank	Time	Rank
Mária Jasenčáková	42.692	9	43.171	14	42.849	14	42.538	15	2:51.250	12

== Nordic combined ==
Events:

- normal hill ski jumping (Three jumps, best two counted and shown here.)
- 15 km cross-country skiing

Athlete	Event	Ski Jumping				Cross-country			Total	
Athlete	Event	Distance 1	Distance 2	Points	Rank	Time	Points	Rank	Points	Rank
Ján Klimko	Individual	72.0	85.0	186.9	21	51:03.1	179.335	22	366.235	22
Vladimír Frák	Individual	79.0	79.0	179.7	24	52:10.0	169.300	27	349.000	25

== Ski jumping ==
Athlete	Event	Jump 1		Jump 2		Total	
Athlete	Event	Distance	Points	Distance	Points	Points	Rank
Martin Švagerko	Normal hill	77.0	84.2	75.0	77.5	161.7	42
Vladimír Podzimek	Normal hill	79.0	88.9	75.0	78.5	167.4	39
Jiří Parma	Normal hill	81.0	92.6	88.5	110.1	202.7	10
Pavel Ploc	Normal hill	86.0	101.1	94.0	97.4	198.5	14
Jiří Parma	Large hill	94.0	81.8	100.0	92.2	174.0	23
Vladimír Podzimek	Large hill	98.5	88.6	108.0	105.9	194.5	8
Pavel Ploc	Large hill	103.5	97.1	109.0	105.8	202.9	3rd place, bronze medalist(s)
Ladislav Dluhoš	Large hill	106.0	101.1	95.5	84.4	185.5	12
