= Jiří Lála =

- Born: 21 August 1959 (age 66) Tábor, Czechoslovakia
- Height: 5 ft 9 in (175 cm)
- Weight: 180 lb (82 kg; 12 st 12 lb)
- Position: Right wing
- Shot: Right
- Played for: HC České Budějovice; HC Dukla Jihlava; Eintracht Frankfurt/Frankfurt Lions; Adler Mannheim; SC Bern; Grasshopper Club Zürich; Ayr Scottish Eagles; ERC Selb; EV Eisbären Regensburg
- National team: Czechoslovakia
- NHL draft: 76th overall, 1982; Quebec Nordiques
- Playing career: 1976–2002

Medal record

Representing Czechoslovakia

Men's ice hockey

Olympic Games
Silver medal – second place	1984 Sarajevo	

World Championships
Gold medal – first place	1985 Czechoslovakia	
Silver medal – second place	1982 Finland	
Silver medal – second place	1983 West Germany	
Bronze medal – third place	1981 Sweden	

World Junior Championships
Silver medal – second place	1979 Sweden	

Jiří Lála (born 21 August 1959) is a Czech former professional ice hockey player.

== Career ==
Lála played in the Czechoslovak Extraliga for HC Jihlava. He was a member of the Czechoslovak 1981 Canada Cup team and was a silver medalist at the 1984 Winter Olympics. He was named the best forward at the 1983 World Championships and was the top scorer on the Czechoslovak team that won the world championship in 1985, with 13 points (8+5) in 10 games.

After 510 games and 297 goals in Czechoslovakia, he moved to West Germany in 1989.

He immediately became the top scorer for his home team Eintracht Frankfurt in the 1989/90 and 1990/91 seasons. After heavy mismanagement and near bankruptcy of Eintracht Frankfurt, he played for Mannheimer ERC for two seasons, until he returned to Frankfurt in the 1994/95 season to play in the newly formed Frankfurt Lions team.

He retired from the sport in 2006. Lála was inducted into the Czech Ice Hockey Hall of Fame on 6 May 2010.

== Career statistics ==
=== Regular season and playoffs ===
			Regular season					Playoffs
Season	Team	League	GP	G	A	Pts	PIM	GP	G	A	Pts	PIM
1976–77	TJ Motor České Budějovice	TCH	22	2	6	8	6	—	—	—	—	—
1977–78	TJ Motor České Budějovice	TCH	27	9	4	13	10	—	—	—	—	—
1979–80	TJ Motor České Budějovice	TCH	42	22	18	40	16	—	—	—	—	—
1980–81	ASD Dukla Jihlava	TCH	44	40	22	62	10	—	—	—	—	—
1981–82	ASD Dukla Jihlava	TCH	44	24	26	50	—	—	—	—	—	—
1982–83	TJ Motor České Budějovice	TCH	44	38	22	60	18	—	—	—	—	—
1983–84	TJ Motor České Budějovice	TCH	44	26	24	50	12	—	—	—	—	—
1984–85	TJ Motor České Budějovice	TCH	36	28	13	41	10	—	—	—	—	—
1985–86	TJ Motor České Budějovice	TCH	35	19	25	44	28	—	—	—	—	—
1986–87	TJ Motor České Budějovice	TCH	29	20	23	43	32	—	—	—	—	—
1987–88	TJ Motor České Budějovice	TCH	38	30	38	68	40	—	—	—	—	—
1988–89	TJ Motor České Budějovice	TCH	45	26	39	65	26	—	—	—	—	—
1989–90	Eintracht Frankfurt	1.GBun	35	36	39	75	12	3	1	2	3	4
1990–91	Eintracht Frankfurt	1.GBun	44	47	59	106	28	3	0	1	1	2
1991–92	Mannheimer ERC	1.GBun	28	27	27	54	41	7	6	5	11	6
1991–92	SC Bern	NDA	—	—	—	—	—	1	0	0	0	0
1992–93	Mannheimer ERC	1.GBun	36	32	34	66	28	8	2	6	8	4
1993–94	Mannheimer ERC	1.GBun	41	21	29	50	18	4	4	1	5	4
1994–95	Frankfurt Lions	DEL	41	18	44	62	39	5	4	5	9	4
1994–95	Grasshopper Club Zürich	SUI II	—	—	—	—	—	7	11	4	15	0
1995–96	Frankfurt Lions	DEL	50	36	49	85	18	3	0	3	3	0
1996–97	Ayr Scottish Eagles	GBR	40	24	20	44	10	7	4	11	15	0
1997–98	ERC Selb	DEU II	52	32	52	84	30	—	—	—	—	—
1998–99	ERC Selb	DEU III	31	35	25	60	14	12	11	17	28	8
1999–2000	ERC Selb	DEU III	34	22	33	55	8	—	—	—	—	—
2000–01	EV Regensburg	DEU III	51	36	57	93	18	10	8	18	26	8
2001–02	Eisbären Regensburg	DEU II	20	7	13	20	2	—	—	—	—	—
TCH totals			502	303	275	578	220	—	—	—	—	—
1.GBun totals			184	163	188	351	127	23	13	15	28	20
DEL totals			91	54	93	147	57	8	4	8	12	4

=== International ===
Year	Team	Event	GP	G	A	Pts	PIM
1979	Czechoslovakia	WJC	6	0	3	3	6
1981	Czechoslovakia	WC	8	7	3	10	2
1981	Czechoslovakia	CC	6	4	2	6	0
1982	Czechoslovakia	WC	10	6	3	9	0
1983	Czechoslovakia	WC	10	9	5	14	4
1984	Czechoslovakia	OLY	7	1	4	5	0
1984	Czechoslovakia	CC	5	0	0	0	0
1985	Czechoslovakia	WC	10	8	5	13	6
1986	Czechoslovakia	WC	10	1	1	2	0
1988	Czechoslovakia	OLY	6	2	1	3	2
Junior totals			6	0	3	3	6
Senior totals			72	38	24	62	14
