= Tomáš Jelínek =

Czech ice hockey player

- Born: April 29, 1962 (age 63) Prague, Czechoslovakia
- Height: 5 ft 9 in (175 cm)
- Weight: 189 lb (86 kg; 13 st 7 lb)
- Position: Right wing
- Shot: Left
- Played for: Ottawa Senators
- National team: Czechoslovakia
- NHL draft: 242nd overall, 1992; Ottawa Senators
- Playing career: 1979–1999

Olympic medal record

Men's ice hockey
Bronze medal – third place	1992 Albertville	Ice hockey

Tomáš Jelínek (born April 29, 1962) is a Czech former professional ice hockey winger. He played on the 1992 bronze medal-winning Olympic Hockey team for Czechoslovakia.

At club level Jelínek played briefly in the National Hockey League, appearing in 49 games with the Ottawa Senators during the 1992-93 season. In his homeland, he featured mainly for HC Sparta Praha, HK Dukla Trenčín, TJ Motor České Budějovice and HC Plzeň and had short spells in Finland, Switzerland and Germany.

His elder son Tomáš Jr played hockey mainly in the domestic lower leagues and in France, and younger son Petr captained HC Bílí Tygři Liberec and was also a Czech international.

== Career statistics ==
=== Regular season and playoffs ===
			Regular season					Playoffs
Season	Team	League	GP	G	A	Pts	PIM	GP	G	A	Pts	PIM
1979–80	TJ Sparta ČKD Praha	CSSR	7	0	1	1	6	—	—	—	—	—
1980–81	ASVŠ Dukla Trenčín	CSSR	34	5	6	11	18	—	—	—	—	—
1981–82	ASVŠ Dukla Trenčín	CSSR	36	9	3	12	46	—	—	—	—	—
1982–83	TJ Sparta ČKD Praha	CSSR	40	20	25	45	52	—	—	—	—	—
1983–84	TJ Sparta ČKD Praha	CSSR	43	13	5	18	48	—	—	—	—	—
1984–85	TJ Sparta ČKD Praha	CSSR	44	15	4	19	70	—	—	—	—	—
1985–86	TJ Sparta ČKD Praha	CSSR	40	7	2	9	72	—	—	—	—	—
1986–87	TJ Sparta ČKD Praha	CSSR	36	7	5	12	58	—	—	—	—	—
1987–88	TJ Sparta ČKD Praha	CSSR	45	14	11	25	45	—	—	—	—	—
1988–89	TJ Sparta ČKD Praha	CSSR	45	15	17	32	87	—	—	—	—	—
1989–90	TJ Motor České Budějovice	CSSR	48	23	20	43	—	—	—	—	—	—
1990–91	TJ Motor České Budějovice	CSSR	51	24	23	47	102	—	—	—	—	—
1991–92	HPK	SM-l	41	24	23	47	98	—	—	—	—	—
1991–92	HC Sierre	SUI.2	—	—	—	—	—	6	7	7	14	8
1992–93	Ottawa Senators	NHL	49	7	6	13	52	—	—	—	—	—
1993–94	Zürcher SC	NDA	8	3	3	6	18	3	2	1	3	2
1993–94	HC Sparta Praha	ELH	—	—	—	—	—	5	2	3	5	10
1993–94	PEI Senators	AHL	2	0	0	0	0	—	—	—	—	—
1994–95	HC Slavia Praha	ELH	42	11	16	27	163	2	0	1	1	2
1995–96	HC Slavia Praha	ELH	13	4	5	9	53	—	—	—	—	—
1995–96	HC ZKZ Plzeň	ELH	23	13	20	33	36	3	1	2	3	12
1996–97	HC ZKZ Plzeň	ELH	51	22	26	48	66	—	—	—	—	—
1997–98	HC Keramika Plzeň	ELH	18	5	5	10	20	1	0	0	0	0
1997–98	HC Sparta Praha	ELH	35	6	14	20	80	10	0	5	5	38
1998–99	HC Opava	ELH	7	1	0	1	8	—	—	—	—	—
1998–99	HC Vítkovice	ELH	19	4	6	10	34	—	—	—	—	—
1998–99	1. EV Weiden	DEU.3	14	10	16	26	34	—	—	—	—	—
1999–00	HC Příbram	CZE.3	24	7	11	18	50	—	—	—	—	—
CSSR totals			469	152	122	274	604	—	—	—	—	—
ELH totals			190	59	89	148	460	21	3	11	14	62
NHL totals			49	7	6	13	52	—	—	—	—	—

=== International ===
Year	Team	Event	GP	G	A	Pts	PIM
1980	Czechoslovakia	EJC	5	0	1	1	8
1981	Czechoslovakia	WJC	5	3	1	4	8
1982	Czechoslovakia	WJC	7	2	2	4	6
1989	Czechoslovakia	WC	5	1	1	2	2
1990	Czechoslovakia	WC	10	1	4	5	14
1991	Czechoslovakia	CC	5	2	3	5	10
1992	Czechoslovakia	OLY	8	3	2	5	12
1992	Czechoslovakia	WC	8	4	5	9	10
Junior totals			17	5	4	9	22
Senior totals			36	11	15	26	48
