= Vladimír Caldr =

Czech ice hockey player

- Born: 26 November 1958 (age 67) Písek, Czechoslovakia
- Position: Right wing
- Shot: Left
- Played for: Motor České Budějovice; ASD Dukla Jihlava
- National team: Czechoslovakia
- Playing career: 1977–1994

Vladimír Caldr (born 26 November 1958) is a Czech former professional ice hockey player.

Caldr played in the Czechoslovak First Ice Hockey League for Motor České Budějovice and ASD Dukla Jihlava. He played for the Czechoslovak national team and won a silver medal at the 1984 Winter Olympics.

== Career statistics ==
=== Regular season and playoffs ===
			Regular season					Playoffs
Season	Team	League	GP	G	A	Pts	PIM	GP	G	A	Pts	PIM
1977–78	TJ Motor České Budějovice	TCH	44	9	7	16	22	—	—	—	—	—
1980–81	TJ Motor České Budějovice	TCH	39	15	20	35	18	—	—	—	—	—
1981–82	TJ Motor České Budějovice	TCH	41	18	22	40	56	—	—	—	—	—
1982–83	TJ Motor České Budějovice	TCH	44	17	26	43	33	—	—	—	—	—
1983–84	TJ Motor České Budějovice	TCH	38	26	25	51	30	—	—	—	—	—
1984–85	TJ Motor České Budějovice	TCH	40	19	22	41	49	—	—	—	—	—
1985–86	TJ Motor České Budějovice	TCH	44	19	34	53	53	—	—	—	—	—
1986–87	ASD Dukla Jihlava	TCH	43	10	13	23	12	—	—	—	—	—
1987–88	TJ Motor České Budějovice	TCH	42	17	36	53	14	—	—	—	—	—
1988–89	TJ Motor České Budějovice	TCH	40	7	13	20	12	—	—	—	—	—
1989–90	Amstel Tijgers Amsterdam	NLD II
1990–91	Amstel Tijgers Amsterdam	NLD	24	19	12	31	14	—	—	—	—	—
1992–93	HC Stadion Hradec Králové	TCH II	—	21	11	32	—	—	—	—	—	—
1992–93	ERC Ingolstadt	DEU II	8	15	9	24	0	—	—	—	—	—
1993–94	HC VS VTJ Tábor	CZE II	—	1	3	4	—	—	—	—	—	—
1993–94	HC České Budějovice	CZE II	10	3	3	6	2	3	0	0	0	0
TCH totals			428	160	221	381	301	—	—	—	—	—

=== International ===
Medal record

Representing Czechoslovakia

Men's Ice Hockey
Silver medal – second place	1984 Sarajevo	Team

Year	Team	Event	GP	G	A	Pts	PIM
1977	Czechoslovakia	WJC	7	2	1	3	0
1978	Czechoslovakia	WJC	6	2	3	5	0
1983	Czechoslovakia	WC	10	2	4	6	0
1984	Czechoslovakia	OG	7	4	0	4	2
1984	Czechoslovakia	CC	5	0	0	0	0
1986	Czechoslovakia	WC	6	0	1	1	4
Junior totals			13	4	4	8	0
Senior totals			28	6	5	11	4
