= Eduard Uvíra =

Czechoslovak ice hockey player

Personal information
- Born: 12 July 1961 (age 64) Opava, Czechoslovakia

Sport
- Sport: Ice hockey
- Position: Defenceman
Medal record
Representing Czechoslovakia
Men's Ice Hockey
Silver medal – second place	1984 Sarajevo	Team

Eduard Uvíra (born 12 July 1961) is an ice hockey defenceman who played for the Czechoslovak national team. He won a silver medal at the 1984 Winter Olympics.

== Career statistics ==
=== Regular season and playoffs ===
			Regular season					Playoffs
Season	Team	League	GP	G	A	Pts	PIM	GP	G	A	Pts	PIM
1980–81	TJ CHZ Litvínov	TCH	38	5	6	11	26	—	—	—	—	—
1981–82	ASD Dukla Jihlava	TCH	39	4	4	8	—	—	—	—	—	—
1982–83	ASD Dukla Jihlava	TCH	43	6	10	16	28	—	—	—	—	—
1983–84	TJ CHZ Litvínov	TCH	43	7	10	17	24	—	—	—	—	—
1984–85	TJ CHZ Litvínov	TCH	43	7	6	13	44	—	—	—	—	—
1985–86	Slovan ChZJD Bratislava	TCH	43	6	16	22	32	—	—	—	—	—
1986–87	Slovan ChZJD Bratislava	TCH	37	4	12	16	46	—	—	—	—	—
1987–88	Slovan ChZJD Bratislava	TCH	34	2	6	8	22	—	—	—	—	—
1988–89	Slovan ChZJD Bratislava	TCH	25	2	2	4	24	—	—	—	—	—
1989–90	Slovan ChZJD Bratislava	SVK II
1990–91	EHC Freiburg	1.GBun	35	8	13	21	82	—	—	—	—	—
1991–92	EHC Freiburg	1.GBun	39	8	16	24	52	—	—	—	—	—
1992–93	EHC Freiburg	1.GBun	43	6	14	20	48	—	—	—	—	—
1993–94	EV Landshut	1.GBun	44	2	9	11	43	7	1	1	2	2
1994–95	EV Landshut	DEL	40	1	12	13	53	18	0	4	4	16
1995–96	EV Landshut	DEL	47	2	13	15	79	11	1	6	7	8
1996–97	EV Landshut	DEL	42	3	10	13	46	7	0	0	0	8
1997–98	EV Landshut	DEL	18	0	0	0	24	4	0	1	1	0
1998–99	EHC Freiburg	DEU II	51	5	14	19	22	7	0	0	0	4
1999–2000	EV Landshut	DEU III	60	8	31	39	58	—	—	—	—	—
2000–01	EV Landshut	DEU III	36	3	13	16	48	3	0	1	1	4
2001–02	München Barons	DEL	22	0	1	1	28	—	—	—	—	—
2002–03	EHC Freiburg	DEU II	2	1	1	2	2	—	—	—	—	—
TCH totals			345	43	72	115	246	—	—	—	—	—
1.GBun totals			161	24	52	76	225	7	1	1	2	2
DEL totals			169	6	36	42	230	40	1	11	12	32

=== International ===
Year	Team	Event	GP	G	A	Pts	PIM
1979	Czechoslovakia	EJC
1980	Czechoslovakia	WJC	5	0	1	1	2
1981	Czechoslovakia	WJC	5	0	2	2	2
1982	Czechoslovakia	WC	10	0	2	2	6
1983	Czechoslovakia	WC	10	0	0	0	6
1984	Czechoslovakia	OG	7	1	1	2	2
1984	Czechoslovakia	CC	5	0	1	1	6
1985	Czechoslovakia	WC	10	0	3	3	4
1988	Czechoslovakia	OG	2	0	0	0	0
Senior totals			44	1	7	8	24
