= Arnold Kadlec =

Czech ice hockey player

- Born: 8 January 1959 (age 67) Most, Czechoslovakia
- Height: 6 ft 2 in (188 cm)
- Weight: 212 lb (96 kg; 15 st 2 lb)
- Position: Defense
- Shot: Right
- Played for: TJ CHZ Litvínov; ASD Dukla Jihlava; Lukko
- National team: Czechoslovakia
- NHL draft: 206th overall, 1982; Minnesota North Stars
- Playing career: 1976–1991

Arnold Kadlec (born 8 January 1959) is a Czech retired ice hockey player. He played for the Czechoslovak national team at the 1980 and 1984 Winter Olympics, winning a silver medal in 1984.

== Career statistics ==
=== Regular season and playoffs ===
			Regular season					Playoffs
Season	Team	League	GP	G	A	Pts	PIM	GP	G	A	Pts	PIM
1976–77	TJ CHZ Litvínov	TCH	8	3	0	3	—	—	—	—	—	—
1977–78	TJ CHZ Litvínov	TCH	42	1	1	2	38	—	—	—	—	—
1978–79	ASD Dukla Jihlava	TCH	30	4	3	7	16	—	—	—	—	—
1979–80	ASD Dukla Jihlava	TCH	43	7	12	19	40	—	—	—	—	—
1980–81	TJ CHZ Litvínov	TCH	42	16	13	29	38	—	—	—	—	—
1981–82	TJ CHZ Litvínov	TCH	40	14	12	26	62	—	—	—	—	—
1982–83	TJ CHZ Litvínov	TCH	43	10	10	20	30	—	—	—	—	—
1983–84	TJ CHZ Litvínov	TCH	44	10	13	23	34	—	—	—	—	—
1984–85	TJ CHZ Litvínov	TCH	40	10	19	29	45	—	—	—	—	—
1985–86	TJ CHZ Litvínov	TCH	27	4	23	27	—	—	—	—	—	—
1986–87	TJ CHZ Litvínov	TCH	29	0	13	13	40	—	—	—	—	—
1987–88	TJ CHZ Litvínov	TCH	35	9	16	25	70	—	—	—	—	—
1988–89	TJ CHZ Litvínov	TCH	32	11	11	22	38	—	—	—	—	—
1989–90	Lukko	Liiga	29	4	11	15	36	—	—	—	—	—
1990–91	HC Fassa	ITA	21	5	17	22	12	—	—	—	—	—
1991–92	KLH VT VTJ Chomutov	TCH II
TCH totals			455	99	146	245	451	—	—	—	—	—

=== International ===
Year	Team	Event	GP	G	A	Pts	PIM
1978	Czechoslovakia	WJC	6	0	3	3	6
1979	Czechoslovakia	WJC	6	0	1	1	2
1980	Czechoslovakia	OG	6	1	2	3	8
1981	Czechoslovakia	WC	8	5	1	6	2
1981	Czechoslovakia	CC	6	1	2	3	4
1982	Czechoslovakia	WC	9	1	2	3	6
1983	Czechoslovakia	WC	9	1	1	2	6
1984	Czechoslovakia	OG	7	2	1	3	4
1984	Czechoslovakia	CC	4	0	1	1	2
1985	Czechoslovakia	WC	6	0	0	0	6
1986	Czechoslovakia	WC	8	0	3	3	10
Junior totals			12	0	4	4	8
Senior totals			63	11	13	24	48

== Sources ==
- Biographical information and career statistics from NHL.com, or Eliteprospects.com, or Eurohockey.com, or The Internet Hockey Database
