= Antonín Stavjaňa =

- Born: 10 February 1963 (age 63) Gottwaldov, Czechoslovakia
- Height: 6 ft 0 in (183 cm)
- Weight: 198 lb (90 kg; 14 st 2 lb)
- Position: Defence
- Shot: Left
- Played for: HC Dukla Trenčín; TJ Gottwaldov/HC Zlín; Jokipojat; HV71; HC Vsetín
- National team: Czechoslovakia and Czech Republic
- NHL draft: 247th overall, 1986; Calgary Flames
- Playing career: 1981–1998

Antonín Stavjaňa (born 10 February 1963) is a retired professional ice hockey player and an ice hockey coach.

Stavjaňa played in the Czechoslovak Extraliga for HC Dukla Trenčín, TJ Gottwaldov and HC Zlín. He then moved to Finland for Jokipojat and in Sweden for HV71 before returning to the Extraliga with HC Vsetín. He was a member of the Czechoslovak 1987 Canada Cup and 1991 Canada Cup teams and competed for Czechoslovakia in the 1988 Winter Olympics and the 1994 Winter Olympics. Stavjaňa was drafted 247th overall by the Calgary Flames in the 1986 NHL entry draft but never signed a contract.

Stavjaňa later worked as a successful coach, coaching several teams, including HC Vsetín and HK Nitra.

== Career statistics ==
=== Regular season and playoffs ===
			Regular season					Playoffs
Season	Team	League	GP	G	A	Pts	PIM	GP	G	A	Pts	PIM
1980–81	TJ Gottwaldov	TCH	41	1	3	4	14	—	—	—	—	—
1981–82	TJ Gottwaldov	TCH	43	3	7	10		—	—	—	—	—
1982–83	ASVŠ Dukla Trenčín	SVK.2		4				—	—	—	—	—
1983–84	ASVŠ Dukla Trenčín	TCH	38	3	10	13	12	—	—	—	—	—
1983–84	TJ Gottwaldov	TCH	5	0	1	1	0	—	—	—	—	—
1984–85	TJ Gottwaldov	TCH	43	5	6	11	10	—	—	—	—	—
1985–86	TJ Gottwaldov	TCH	34	10	8	18	12	5	1	3	4
1986–87	TJ Gottwaldov	TCH	33	11	7	18	10	7	1	2	3
1987–88	TJ Gottwaldov	TCH	40	10	15	25	21	—	—	—	—	—
1988–89	TJ Gottwaldov	TCH	43	11	12	23	12	—	—	—	—	—
1989–90	TJ Zlín	TCH	46	7	14	21		—	—	—	—	—
1990–91	JoKP	FIN.2	42	13	35	48	10	—	—	—	—	—
1991–92	JoKP	SM-l	44	9	11	20	24	—	—	—	—	—
1992–93	HV71	SEL	39	2	11	13	14	—	—	—	—	—
1993–94	HV71	SEL	39	4	13	17	20	—	—	—	—	—
1994–95	HC Dadák Vsetín	ELH	41	1	15	16	20	11	4	4	8	4
1995–96	HC Dadák Vsetín	ELH	34	8	19	27	14	13	2	2	4	0
1996–97	HC Petra Vsetín	ELH	43	9	9	18	10	10	0	5	5	2
1997–98	HC Petra Vsetín	ELH	44	5	6	11	24	10	0	4	4	10
1999–2000	HC Uherské Hradiště	CZE.3	5	0	0	0	0	—	—	—	—	—
TCH totals			366	61	83	144	91	12	2	5	7	—
ELH totals			162	23	49	72	68	44	6	15	21	16

=== International ===
Year	Team	Event	GP	G	A	Pts	PIM
1980	Czechoslovakia	EJC	5	0	0	0	2
1981	Czechoslovakia	WJC	5	0	1	1	0
1981	Czechoslovakia	EJC	5	2	2	4	0
1982	Czechoslovakia	WJC	7	0	7	7	4
1983	Czechoslovakia	WJC	7	0	1	1	4
1984	Czechoslovakia	CC	5	0	0	0	4
1985	Czechoslovakia	WC	10	1	4	5	8
1986	Czechoslovakia	WC	10	2	3	5	4
1987	Czechoslovakia	WC	9	1	1	2	8
1987	Czechoslovakia	CC	6	0	1	1	2
1988	Czechoslovakia	OG	8	4	5	9	4
1989	Czechoslovakia	WC	10	1	3	4	2
1990	Czechoslovakia	WC	9	0	1	1	4
1993	Czechoslovakia	WC	8	0	1	1	4
1994	Czech Republic	OG	8	0	0	0	2
1995	Czech Republic	WC	7	1	0	1	8
1996	Czech Republic	WC	8	1	2	3	0
Junior totals			29	2	11	13	10
Senior totals			98	11	21	32	50
