= Otakar Janecký =

Czech ice hockey player

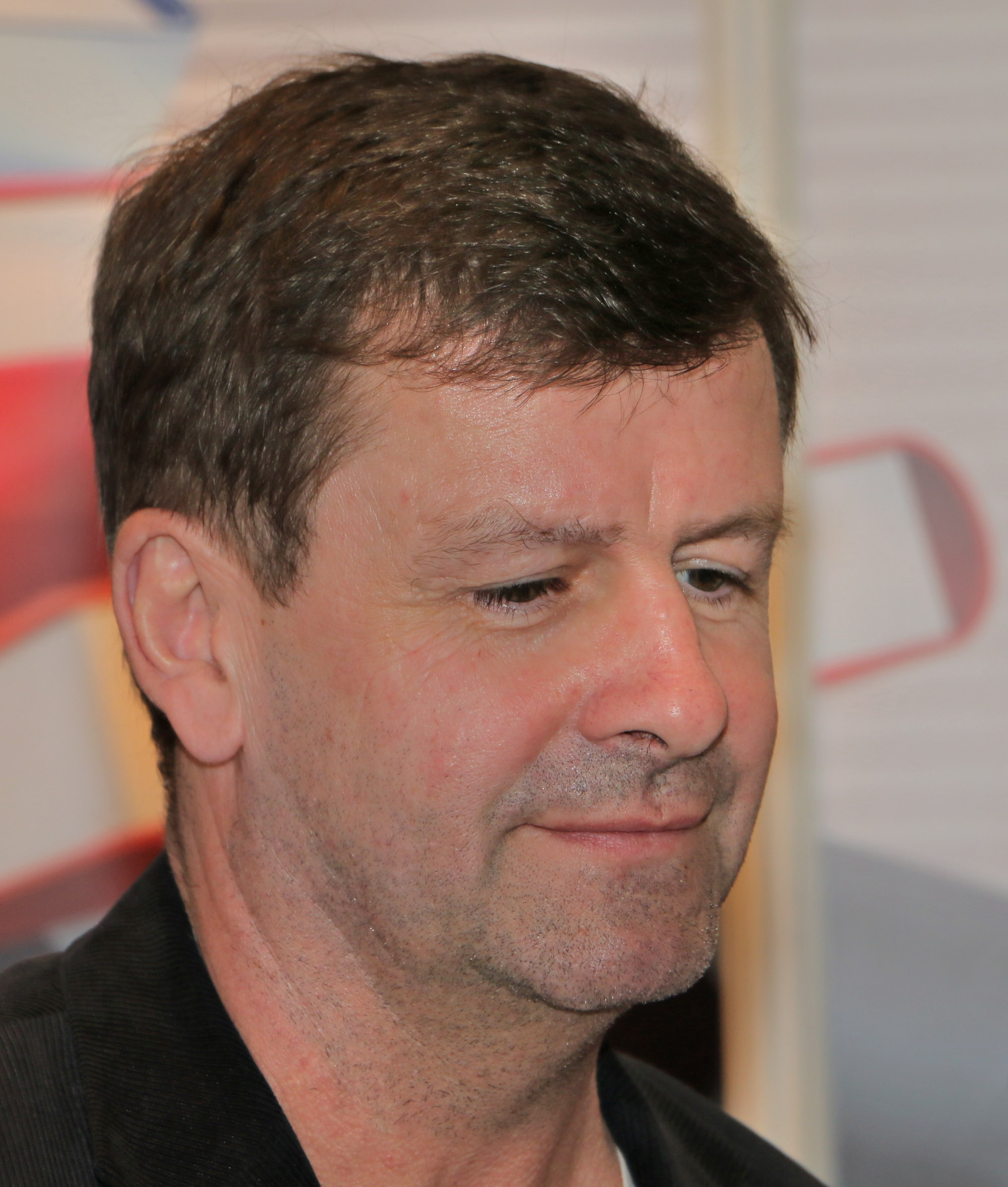
- Born: 26 December 1960 (age 64); Pardubice, Czechoslovakia
- Height: 5 ft 10 in (178 cm)
- Weight: 182 lb (83 kg; 13 st 0 lb)
- Position: Centre
- Shot: Left
- Played for: Czech Extraliga; HC Pardubice; SM-liiga; Jokerit; SaiPa; Blues
- National team: Czechoslovakia and Czech Republic
- Playing career: 1978–2004

Otakar Janecký (born 26 December 1960) is a Czech retired ice hockey player who played as a forward.

== Career ==
In his homeland Janecký represented HC Pardubice, his birthcity team for his entire Czechoslovak Extraliga and Czech Extraliga career.

Janecký represented Jokerit in the Finnish SM-liiga for several seasons, and his number, 91, has been retired by Jokerit. Janecký also played SM-liiga for SaiPa and Blues.

He played on the 1992 Olympic bronze medal-winning team from Czechoslovakia.

Otakar Janecký is Jokerit's all-time leader in assists, second in points and all-time playoffs leader in points and assists.

== Family ==
Janecký's son, Otakar Jr. played ice hockey in Finnish Mestis team Jokipojat.

== Career statistics ==
=== Regular season and playoffs ===
			Regular season					Playoffs
Season	Team	League	GP	G	A	Pts	PIM	GP	G	A	Pts	PIM
1978–79	TJ Tesla Pardubice	TCH	10	1	0	1	34	—	—	—	—	—
1979–80	ASD Dukla Jihlava B	CZE.2	—	14	—	—	—	—	—	—	—	—
1981–82	TJ Tesla Pardubice	TCH	44	17	20	37	—	—	—	—	—	—
1982–83	TJ Tesla Pardubice	TCH	44	18	26	44	70	—	—	—	—	—
1983–84	TJ Tesla Pardubice	TCH	38	11	15	26	39	—	—	—	—	—
1984–85	TJ Tesla Pardubice	TCH	43	9	25	34	40	—	—	—	—	—
1985–86	TJ Tesla Pardubice	TCH	47	26	27	53	—	—	—	—	—	—
1986–87	TJ Tesla Pardubice	TCH	43	17	23	40	48	—	—	—	—	—
1987–88	TJ Tesla Pardubice	TCH	44	20	29	49	—	—	—	—	—	—
1988–89	TJ Tesla Pardubice	TCH	44	13	41	54	40	—	—	—	—	—
1989–90	TJ Tesla Pardubice	TCH	44	22	28	50	34	—	—	—	—	—
1990–91	SaiPa	SM-l	44	21	39	60	32	—	—	—	—	—
1991–92	Jokerit	SM-l	42	17	35	52	49	10	2	11	13	6
1992–93	Jokerit	SM-l	46	10	43	53	56	3	2	5	7	4
1993–94	Jokerit	SM-l	48	10	42	52	24	12	5	4	9	14
1994–95	Jokerit	SM-l	50	12	38	50	26	11	2	13	15	8
1995–96	Jokerit	SM-l	46	17	38	55	24	11	3	16	19	8
1996–97	Jokerit	SM-l	38	13	31	44	38	9	2	13	15	8
1997–98	Jokerit	SM-l	46	7	20	27	36	8	4	4	8	2
1998–99	Jokerit	SM-l	39	13	32	45	40	2	2	1	3	0
1999–2000	Espoo Blues	SM-l	51	13	28	41	52	4	0	3	3	10
2000–01	HC IPB Pojišťovna Pardubice	ELH	48	10	29	39	26	7	0	6	6	0
2001–02	HC IPB Pojišťovna Pardubice	ELH	48	4	24	28	100	5	2	0	2	10
2002–03	HC ČSOB Pojišťovna Pardubice	ELH	44	5	14	19	32	18	2	2	4	6
2003–04	HC Moeller Pardubice	ELH	43	1	11	12	55	—	—	—	—	—
2004–05	HC Vrchlabí	CZE.4	2	2	2	4	—	—	—	—	—	—
TCH totals			401	154	234	388	—	—	—	—	—	—
SM-l totals			450	133	346	479	377	70	22	70	92	60
ELH totals			183	20	78	98	213	30	4	8	12	16

=== International ===
Olympic medal record

Ice hockey

Olympic Games
Bronze medal – third place	1992 Albertville	Ice hockey

World Championships
Bronze medal – third place	1989 Sweden	
Bronze medal – third place	1992 Czechoslovakia	
Bronze medal – third place	1993 Germany	

Year	Team	Event	GP	G	A	Pts	PIM
1980	Czechoslovakia	WJC	2	0	2	2	0
1989	Czechoslovakia	WC	10	4	2	6	2
1992	Czechoslovakia	OG	8	4	3	7	2
1992	Czechoslovakia	WC	8	1	4	5	6
1993	Czech Republic	WC	8	1	4	5	2
1994	Czech Republic	OG	8	2	5	7	6
1994	Czech Republic	WC	6	0	2	2	0
Senior totals			48	12	20	32	18

== Awards ==
- Jari Kurri trophy for best player during the playoffs - 1997

Preceded by Petri Varis	Winner of the Jari Kurri trophy 1996-97	Succeeded by Olli Jokinen
