= Dušan Pašek =

Czechoslovak ice hockey player

- Born: 7 September 1960 Bratislava, Czechoslovakia
- Died: 15 March 1998 (aged 37) Bratislava, Slovakia
- Height: 6 ft 1 in (185 cm)
- Weight: 200 lb (91 kg; 14 st 4 lb)
- Position: Centre
- Shot: Left
- Played for: KalPa; HC Fassa; HC Ambrì–Piotta; HC Asiago; Slovan Bratislava; Minnesota North Stars; ASD Dukla Jihlava
- National team: Czechoslovakia
- NHL draft: 81st overall, 1982; Minnesota North Stars
- Playing career: 1977–1993

Medal record

Representing Czechoslovakia

Men's ice hockey

World Junior Championships
Silver medal – second place	1979 Sweden	

World Championships
Gold medal – first place	1985 Czechoslovakia	
Silver medal – second place	1982 Finland	
Silver medal – second place	1983 West Germany	
Bronze medal – third place	1987 Austria	

Olympic Games
Silver medal – second place	1984 Sarajevo	

Dušan Pašek (1960 – 1998) was a Czechoslovak and Slovak professional ice hockey forward who played 48 games in the National Hockey League with the Minnesota North Stars. The rest of his career, which lasted from 1977 to 1993, was mainly spent with Slovan Bratislava in the Czechoslovak Extraliga. He won a silver medal at the 1984 Winter Olympics and represented Czechoslovakia at three Canada Cups. He also won a gold medal at the 1985 World Ice Hockey Championships.

Pašek was president of the Slovak Ice Hockey Federation when he died.

== Career statistics ==
=== Regular season and playoffs ===
			Regular season					Playoffs
Season	Team	League	GP	G	A	Pts	PIM	GP	G	A	Pts	PIM
1976–77	Slovan ChZJD Bratislava	CSSR U20	—	—	—	—	—	—	—	—	—	—
1977–78	Slovan ChZJD Bratislava	CSSR	5	0	1	1	0	—	—	—	—	—
1978–79	Slovan ChZJD Bratislava	CSSR	36	9	12	21	18	—	—	—	—	—
1979–80	Slovan ChZJD Bratislava	CSSR	40	18	1	19	22	—	—	—	—	—
1980–81	Slovan ChZJD Bratislava	CSSR	34	22	10	32	12	—	—	—	—	—
1981–82	Slovan ChZJD Bratislava	SVK-2	—	—	—	—	—	—	—	—	—	—
1982–83	Slovan ChZJD Bratislava	CSSR	43	23	23	46	62	—	—	—	—	—
1983–84	Slovan ChZJD Bratislava	CSSR	40	28	19	47	62	—	—	—	—	—
1984–85	Slovan ChZJD Bratislava	CSSR	40	23	14	37	60	—	—	—	—	—
1985–86	ASD Dukla Jihlava	CSSR	45	13	11	24	44	—	—	—	—	—
1986–87	Slovan ChZJD Bratislava	CSSR	38	21	29	50	81	—	—	—	—	—
1987–88	Slovan ChZJD Bratislava	CSSR	40	19	18	37	81	—	—	—	—	—
1988–89	Minnesota North Stars	NHL	48	4	10	14	30	2	1	0	1	0
1989–90	Kalamazoo Wings	IHL	20	10	14	24	6	—	—	—	—	—
1990–91	Slovan ChZJD Bratislava	CSSR	11	11	5	16	20	—	—	—	—	—
1990–91	HC Asiago	ITA	34	35	41	76	22	3	5	1	6	0
1990–91	HC Ambrì–Piotta	NDA	1	2	1	3	0	5	1	1	2	9
1991–92	HC Fassa	ALP	18	19	22	41	45	—	—	—	—	—
1991–92	HC Fassa	ITA	17	15	25	40	12	8	7	8	15	10
1992–93	KalPa	FIN	10	2	4	6	16	—	—	—	—	—
CSSR totals			372	187	143	330	462	—	—	—	—	—
NHL totals			48	4	10	14	30	2	1	0	1	0

=== International ===
Year	Team	Event	GP	G	A	Pts	PIM
1978	Czechoslovakia	EJC	5	6	4	10	4
1979	Czechoslovakia	WJC	6	2	0	2	2
1980	Czechoslovakia	WJC	5	6	1	7	4
1981	Czechoslovakia	CC	6	0	2	2	2
1982	Czechoslovakia	WC	10	1	2	3	4
1983	Czechoslovakia	WC	10	3	2	5	6
1984	Czechoslovakia	OLY	7	0	4	4	2
1984	Czechoslovakia	CC	5	0	0	0	4
1985	Czechoslovakia	WC	10	3	3	6	6
1986	Czechoslovakia	WC	10	4	3	7	16
1987	Czechoslovakia	WC	10	6	2	8	2
1987	Czechoslovakia	CC	6	4	1	5	12
1988	Czechoslovakia	OLY	8	6	5	11	8
Junior totals			16	14	5	19	10
Senior totals			82	27	24	51	62

== Death ==
Pašek killed himself on 15 March 1998. He was 37 years old at the time of his suicide.

Twenty-three years later, his son, also named Dušan Pašek, killed himself at the age of 36.
