= Petr Rosol =

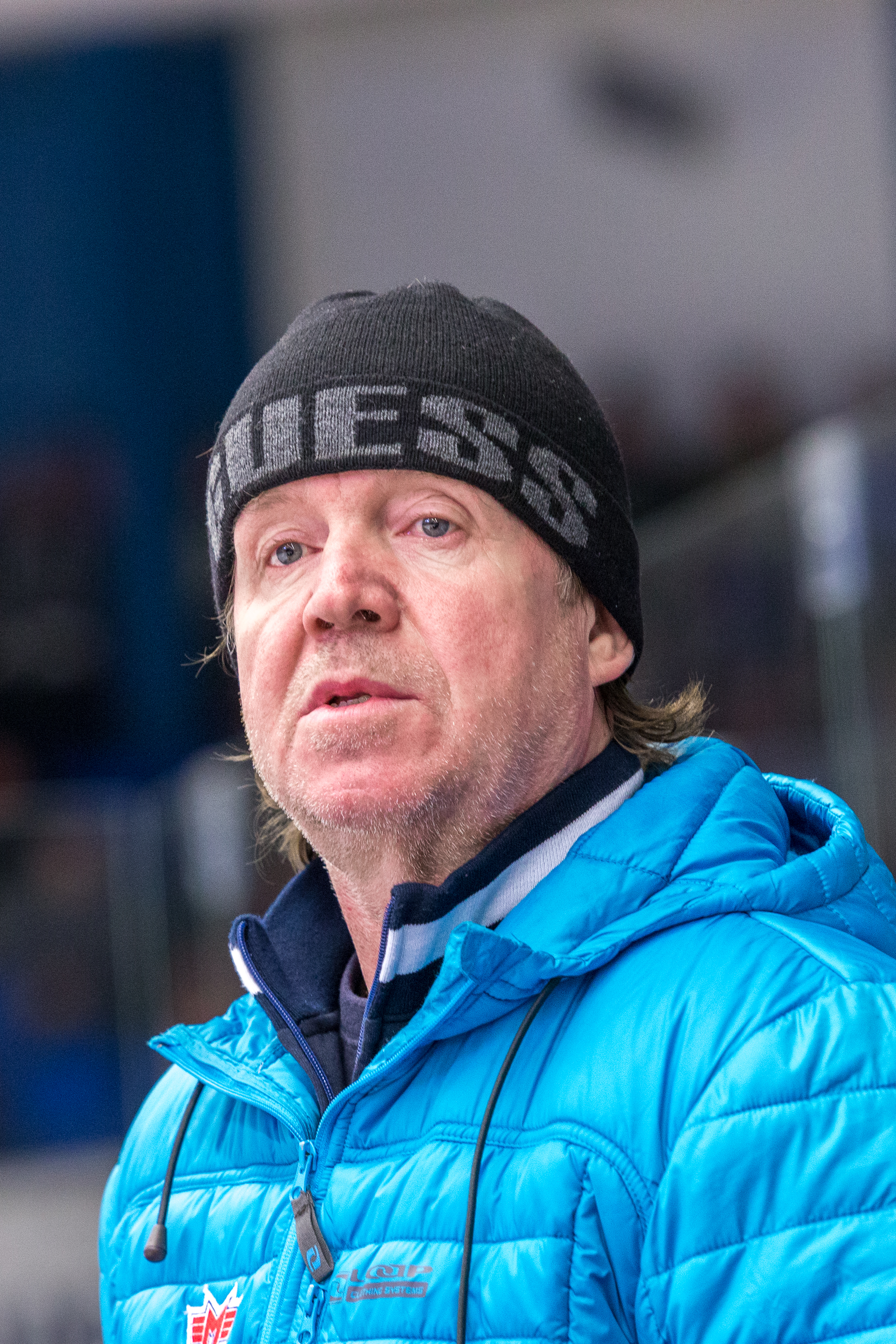
- Born: June 20, 1964 (age 61) Znojmo, Czechoslovakia
- Height: 5 ft 10 in (178 cm)
- Weight: 170 lb (77 kg; 12 st 2 lb)
- Position: Right wing
- Shot: Right
- Played for: HC Litvínov; HC Dukla Jihlava; Fassa; HC Sierre-Anniviers; HC Lugano; HC Martigny; EHC Visp
- National team: Czechoslovakia and Czech Republic
- NHL draft: 75th overall, 1984; Calgary Flames
- Playing career: 1981–2004

Olympic medal record

Men's Ice hockey
Bronze medal – third place	1992 Albertville	Ice hockey

Petr Rosol (born June 20, 1964) is a Czech former professional ice hockey forward. He played in the 1992 Olympic ice hockey for Czechoslovakia where he won a bronze medal. He was drafted 75th overall by the Calgary Flames in the 1984 NHL entry draft.

== Career statistics ==
=== Regular season and playoffs ===
			Regular season					Playoffs
Season	Team	League	GP	G	A	Pts	PIM	GP	G	A	Pts	PIM
1981–82	TJ CHZ Litvínov	TCH	39	17	21	38	—	—	—	—	—	—
1982–83	TJ CHZ Litvínov	TCH	43	17	16	33	44	—	—	—	—	—
1983–84	ASD Dukla Jihlava	TCH	44	26	19	45	57	—	—	—	—	—
1984–85	ASD Dukla Jihlava	TCH	40	32	22	54	88	—	—	—	—	—
1985–86	TJ CHZ Litvínov	TCH	40	31	24	55	—	—	—	—	—	—
1986–87	TJ CHZ Litvínov	TCH	25	17	10	27	68	—	—	—	—	—
1987–88	TJ CHZ Litvínov	TCH	33	20	22	42	—	—	—	—	—	—
1988–89	TJ CHZ Litvínov	TCH	32	8	32	40	32	—	—	—	—	—
1989–90	TJ CHZ Litvínov	TCH	47	25	38	63	—	—	—	—	—	—
1990–91	HC CHZ Litvínov	TCH	41	19	26	45	50	—	—	—	—	—
1990–91	HC Fassa	ITA	24	23	33	56	10	—	—	—	—	—
1991–92	HC Fassa	ITA	18	25	29	54	18	—	—	—	—	—
1992–93	HC Lugano	NDA	24	5	15	20	30	—	—	—	—	—
1992–93	HC Chemopetrol Litvínov	TCH	6	2	5	7	—	—	—	—	—	—
1993–94	HC Martigny	SUI II	36	24	41	65	77	1	0	0	0	0
1994–95	HC Martigny	SUI II	35	26	37	63	100	7	6	7	13	14
1995–96	HC Martigny	SUI II	35	33	42	75	41	3	0	2	2	16
1996–97	HC Martigny	SUI II	40	38	54	92	144	4	2	2	4	18
1997–98	HC Martigny	SUI II	38	35	69	104	36	1	0	0	0	4
1998–99	HC Martigny	SUI II	27	10	34	44	34	—	—	—	—	—
1999–2000	HC Chemopetrol, a. s.	ELH	36	7	9	16	18	7	3	2	5	4
2000–01	HC Chemopetrol, a. s.	ELH	50	6	14	20	10	6	0	1	1	25
2001–02	EHC Visp	SUI II	2	1	3	4	2	5	1	6	7	6
2002–03	ESC Saale Teufel	DEU IV	34	—	—	71	—	—	—	—	—	—
2003–04	Rostocker EC	DEU III	4	4	0	4	27	—	—	—	—	—
TCH totals			390	214	235	449	—	—	—	—	—	—
SUI II totals			213	167	280	447	434	21	9	17	26	58

=== International ===
Year	Team	Event	GP	G	A	Pts	PIM
1981	Czechoslovakia	EJC	4	3	3	6	2
1982	Czechoslovakia	EJC	—	8	5	13	—
1982	Czechoslovakia	WJC	7	1	4	5	8
1983	Czechoslovakia	WJC	7	7	3	10	14
1984	Czechoslovakia	WJC	7	10	5	15	23
1984	Czechoslovakia	CC	5	0	1	1	2
1985	Czechoslovakia	WC	2	2	0	2	0
1986	Czechoslovakia	WC	10	6	4	10	4
1987	Czechoslovakia	WC	8	3	1	4	4
1987	Czechoslovakia	CC	6	0	0	0	4
1988	Czechoslovakia	OG	8	3	1	4	10
1991	Czechoslovakia	WC	10	3	6	9	4
1992	Czechoslovakia	OG	7	6	2	8	2
1992	Czechoslovakia	WC	8	0	2	2	14
1993	Czech Republic	WC	8	4	5	9	10
Senior totals			72	25	24	49	54
