= Jiří Hrdina =

Czech ice hockey player (born 1958)

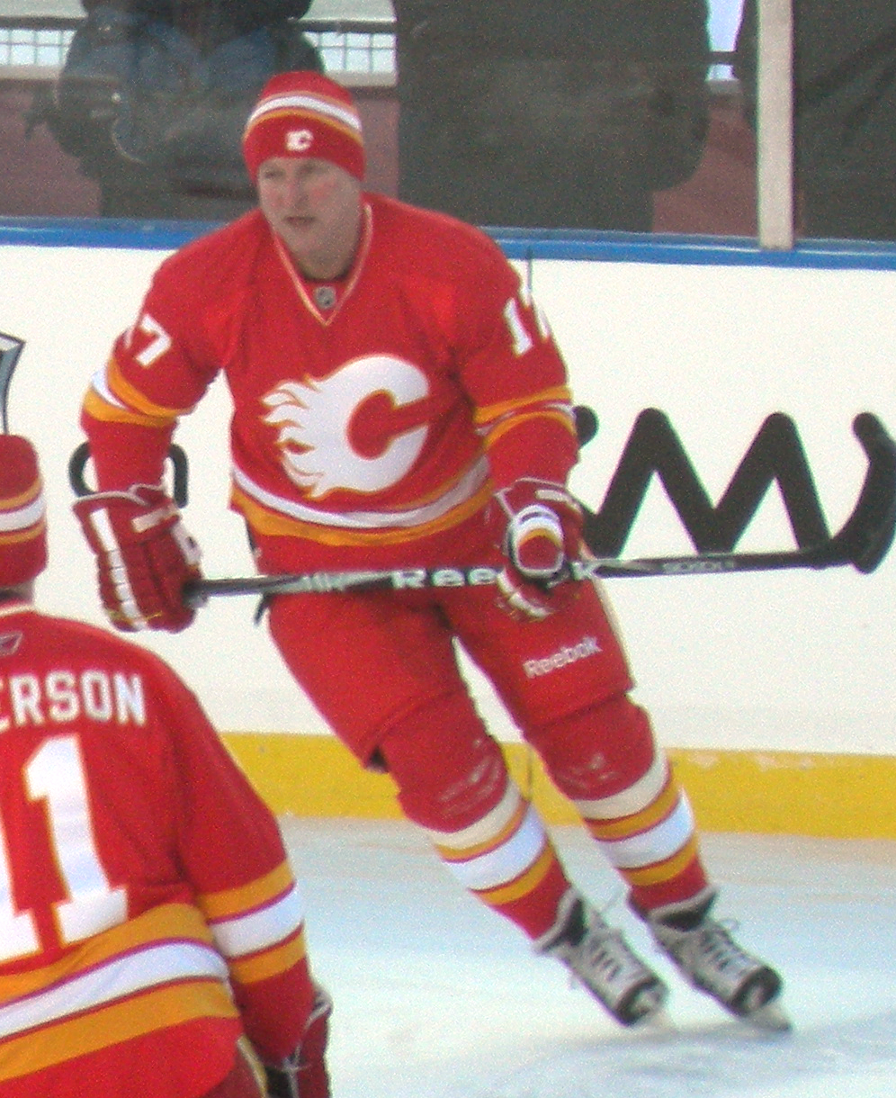
- Hrdina during the alumni game at the 2011 Heritage Classic
- Born: 5 January 1958 (age 68) Mladá Boleslav, Czechoslovakia
- Height: 6 ft 0 in (183 cm)
- Weight: 195 lb (88 kg; 13 st 13 lb)
- Position: Centre
- Shot: Left
- Played for: Calgary Flames; Pittsburgh Penguins
- National team: Czechoslovakia
- NHL draft: 159th Overall, 1984; Calgary Flames
- Playing career: 1977–1992

Medal record

Men's ice hockey

Representing Czechoslovakia

Winter Olympics
Silver medal – second place	1984 Sarajevo	

World Championship
Silver medal – second place	1982 Finland	
Silver medal – second place	1983 West Germany	
Gold medal – first place	1985 Czechoslovakia	
Bronze medal – third place	1987 Austria	
Bronze medal – third place	1990 Switzerland	

World Junior Championship
Bronze medal – third place	1977 Czechoslovakia	

Jiří Hrdina (born 5 January 1958) is a Czech former professional ice hockey player. He spent 10 seasons in the Czechoslovak First League with Sparta ČKD Praha and HK Dukla Trenčín and five in the National Hockey League (NHL) with the Calgary Flames and Pittsburgh Penguins. Of his four full NHL seasons, Hrdina is a three-time Stanley Cup champion, playing on NHL championship teams in 1989, 1991 and 1992.

Internationally, Hrdina was a member of the Czechoslovak national team between 1977 and 1990. He appeared in two Canada Cups, and played in six World Championships. He was a member of five World Championship medal-winning teams, including a gold medal at the 1985 tournament. He is a two-time Olympian and won a silver medal with the Czechoslovak team at the 1984 Games in Sarajevo.

== Playing career ==
=== National Hockey League ===
The Calgary Flames selected Hrdina with their eighth round selection, 159th overall, at the 1984 NHL entry draft. However, due to a Czechoslovak policy at the time regarding national team players, he was not permitted to join a professional team until after the 1988 Winter Olympics. Hrdina joined the Flames at the Games' conclusion, and made his NHL debut, as a 30-year-old, on 3 March 1988. He recorded his first point, an assist, in that game, then scored his first NHL goal on March 15 against the Hartford Whalers. He appeared in nine games to end the 1987–88 season with Calgary and scored two goals and seven points.

Hrdina had a four-goal game early in his first full NHL season, 1988–89, leading the Flames to a 6–3 win over the Whalers. On the season, he appeared in 70 games and scored 22 goals to go along with 32 assists. He appeared in only four playoff games that season, but was a member of the Flames' Stanley Cup championship team. Playing as a defensive forward, Hrdina recorded 30 points in 64 games in 1989–90.

In need of an additional centre, the Pittsburgh Penguins acquired Hrdina from the Flames on 13 December 1990, in exchange for defenceman Jim Kyte. The team also hoped he could help their star Czechoslovak rookie Jaromír Jágr, who was struggling to adapt to life in North America. Initially upset at the trade, Hrdina considered retiring or returning to Europe, but chose to give Pittsburgh a try first. He finished the 1990–91 season with 23 points in 51 games combined between the Penguins and Flames, and appeared in 14 more in the 1991 Stanley Cup Playoffs. He scored two goals in the playoffs, both in game seven of Pittsburgh's first round series against the New Jersey Devils, including the game winner. The Penguins went on to win the Stanley Cup. As a depth player in 1991–92, Hrdina had 16 points in 56 regular season games, and added two assists in 21 playoff games as the Penguins repeated as champions. He announced his retirement from the NHL following the season. He is currently an amateur scout for the Dallas Stars.

== Career statistics ==
=== Regular season and playoffs ===
			Regular season					Playoffs
Season	Team	League	GP	G	A	Pts	PIM	GP	G	A	Pts	PIM
1977–78	TJ Sparta ČKD Praha	CSSR Jr	35	6	8	14	20	—	—	—	—	—
1978–79	TJ Sparta ČKD Praha	CSSR	39	7	8	15	18	—	—	—	—	—
1979–80	TJ Sparta ČKD Praha	CSSR	44	7	7	14	24	—	—	—	—	—
1980–81	TJ Sparta ČKD Praha	CSSR	42	14	20	34	54	—	—	—	—	—
1981–82	ASVŠ Dukla Trenčín	CSSR	44	11	27	38	36	—	—	—	—	—
1982–83	ASVŠ Dukla Trenčín	SVK-2	36	40	24	64	—	—	—	—	—	—
1983–84	TJ Sparta ČKD Praha	CSSR	44	16	33	49	28	—	—	—	—	—
1984–85	TJ Sparta ČKD Praha	CSSR	44	18	19	37	30	—	—	—	—	—
1985–86	TJ Sparta ČKD Praha	CSSR	40	28	21	49	30	—	—	—	—	—
1986–87	TJ Sparta ČKD Praha	CSSR	37	20	23	43	50	—	—	—	—	—
1987–88	TJ Sparta ČKD Praha	CSSR	22	7	15	22	30	—	—	—	—	—
1987–88	Calgary Flames	NHL	9	2	5	7	2	1	0	0	0	0
1988–89	Calgary Flames	NHL	70	22	32	54	26	4	0	0	0	0
1989–90	Calgary Flames	NHL	64	12	18	30	31	6	0	1	1	2
1990–91	Calgary Flames	NHL	14	0	3	3	4	—	—	—	—	—
1990–91	Pittsburgh Penguins	NHL	37	6	14	20	13	14	2	2	4	6
1991–92	Pittsburgh Penguins	NHL	56	3	13	16	16	21	0	2	2	16
CSSR totals			356	128	197	325	300	—	—	—	—	—
NHL totals			250	46	85	130	92	45	2	5	7	24

=== International ===
Year	Team	Event	Results	GP	G	A	Pts	PIM
1977	Czechoslovakia	WJC	3rd place, bronze medalist(s)	7	2	2	4	0
1978	Czechoslovakia	WJC	4th	6	1	3	4	0
1982	Czechoslovakia	WC	2nd place, silver medalist(s)	9	1	0	1	4
1983	Czechoslovakia	WC	2nd place, silver medalist(s)	9	1	0	1	4
1984	Czechoslovakia	OLY	2nd place, silver medalist(s)	7	4	6	10	10
1984	Czechoslovakia	CC	Q	5	0	1	1	4
1985	Czechoslovakia	WC	1st place, gold medalist(s)	10	2	2	4	4
1986	Czechoslovakia	WC	5th	10	7	5	12	14
1987	Czechoslovakia	WC	3rd place, bronze medalist(s)	10	3	3	6	6
1987	Czechoslovakia	CC	SF	6	1	2	3	0
1988	Czechoslovakia	OLY	6th	8	2	5	7	4
1990	Czechoslovakia	WC	3rd place, bronze medalist(s)	9	1	5	6	8
Junior totals				13	3	5	8	2
Senior totals				83	22	28	50	50
