= Jaroslav Korbela =

Czechoslovak ice hockey player

Medal record

Representing Czechoslovakia

Men's Ice Hockey
| Silver medal – second place | 1984 Sarajevo | Team |

Jaroslav Korbela (born May 20, 1957, in České Budějovice, Czechoslovakia) is an ice hockey player who played for the Czechoslovak national team. He won a silver medal at the 1984 Winter Olympics.

== Career statistics ==
=== Regular season and playoffs ===
| | | | Regular season | | | | | Playoffs |
| Season | Team | League | GP | G | A | Pts | PIM | GP | G | A | Pts | PIM |
|---|---|---|---|---|---|---|---|---|---|---|---|---|
| 1977–78 | TJ Motor České Budějovice | TCH | 18 | 2 | 0 | 2 | 2 | — | — | — | — | — |
| 1979–80 | ASVŠ Dukla Trenčín | TCH | 37 | 9 | 3 | 12 | 48 | — | — | — | — | — |
| 1980–81 | TJ Motor České Budějovice | TCH | 44 | 13 | 18 | 31 | 51 | — | — | — | — | — |
| 1981–82 | TJ Motor České Budějovice | TCH | 43 | 12 | 13 | 25 | — | — | — | — | — | — |
| 1982–83 | TJ Motor České Budějovice | TCH | 37 | 5 | 14 | 19 | 36 | — | — | — | — | — |
| 1983–84 | TJ Motor České Budějovice | TCH | 43 | 17 | 15 | 32 | 60 | — | — | — | — | — |
| 1984–85 | TJ Motor České Budějovice | TCH | 42 | 5 | 6 | 11 | 48 | — | — | — | — | — |
| 1986–87 | TJ Motor České Budějovice | TCH | 42 | 11 | 15 | 26 | 24 | — | — | — | — | — |
| 1987–88 | TJ Motor České Budějovice | TCH | 41 | 12 | 16 | 28 | — | — | — | — | — | — |
| 1990–91 | UEC Linz | AUT II |
| TCH totals | | | 347 | 86 | 100 | 186 | 269 | — | — | — | — | — |

=== International ===
| Year | Team | Event | GP | G | A | Pts | PIM |
|---|---|---|---|---|---|---|---|
| 1976 | Czechoslovakia | EJC |
| 1977 | Czechoslovakia | WJC | 7 | 6 | 2 | 8 | 10 |
| 1981 | Czechoslovakia | WC | 6 | 1 | 1 | 2 | 4 |
| 1981 | Czechoslovakia | CC | 6 | 0 | 1 | 1 | 6 |
| 1982 | Czechoslovakia | WC | 10 | 4 | 2 | 6 | 6 |
| 1984 | Czechoslovakia | OG | 7 | 0 | 1 | 1 | 10 |
| 1984 | Czechoslovakia | CC | 4 | 0 | 0 | 0 | 6 |
| Senior totals | | | 33 | 5 | 5 | 10 | 32 |
