= Vladimír Kýhos =

Olympic ice hockey player

Medal record

Representing Czechoslovakia

Men's Ice Hockey
Silver medal – second place	1984 Sarajevo	Team

Vladimír Kýhos (born June 23, 1956 in Chomutov, Czechoslovakia) is an ice hockey player who played for the Czechoslovak national team. He won a silver medal at the 1984 Winter Olympics.

== Career statistics ==
=== Regular season and playoffs ===
			Regular season					Playoffs
Season	Team	League	GP	G	A	Pts	PIM	GP	G	A	Pts	PIM
1974–75	TJ CHZ Litvínov	TCH	6	0	0	0	—	—	—	—	—	—
1975–76	ASVŠ Dukla Trenčín	SVK II	—	2	—	—	—	—	—	—	—	—
1976–77	TJ Rudá hvězda Litoměřice	TCH II
1977–78	TJ CHZ Litvínov	TCH	40	10	9	19	16	—	—	—	—	—
1978–79	TJ CHZ Litvínov	TCH	40	19	14	33	35	—	—	—	—	—
1979–80	TJ CHZ Litvínov	TCH	44	16	26	42	50	—	—	—	—	—
1980–81	TJ CHZ Litvínov	TCH	42	19	32	51	48	—	—	—	—	—
1981–82	TJ CHZ Litvínov	TCH	34	8	26	34	—	—	—	—	—	—
1982–83	TJ CHZ Litvínov	TCH	35	3	15	18	28	—	—	—	—	—
1983–84	TJ CHZ Litvínov	TCH	35	12	33	45	48	—	—	—	—	—
1984–85	TJ CHZ Litvínov	TCH	41	5	13	18	76	—	—	—	—	—
1985–86	TJ CHZ Litvínov	TCH	31	9	15	24	—	—	—	—	—	—
1986–87	TJ Škoda Plzeň	TCH	30	9	19	28	34	—	—	—	—	—
1988–89	JoKP	FIN II	42	23	44	67	58	5	1	2	3	22
1989–90	JoKP	SM-l	44	7	18	25	28	—	—	—	—	—
1990–91	Hermes	FIN III	31	11	55	66	44	—	—	—	—	—
TCH totals			378	103	209	312	335	—	—	—	—	—

=== International ===
Year	Team	Event	GP	G	A	Pts	PIM
1984	Czechoslovakia	OG	7	1	0	1	4
