= Dárius Rusnák =

Slovak ice hockey player (born 1959)

- Born: 2 December 1959 (age 66) Ružomberok, Czechoslovakia
- Height: 6 ft 1 in (185 cm)
- Weight: 179 lb (81 kg; 12 st 11 lb)
- Position: Centre
- Shot: Right
- Played for: HC Slovan Bratislava; HC Dukla Jihlava; KalPa
- National team: Czechoslovakia
- NHL draft: 230th overall, 1987; Philadelphia Flyers
- Playing career: 1977–1993

Dárius Rusnák (born 2 December 1959) is a Slovak retired professional ice hockey forward who played in the Czechoslovak Extraliga for HC Slovan Bratislava. He was a member of the Czechoslovak 1981 Canada Cup team and was a silver medalist at the 1984 Winter Olympics. He won the gold medal at the 1985 world championship in Prague where he scored the game-winning goal against Canada.

== Career statistics ==
=== Regular season and playoffs ===
			Regular season					Playoffs
Season	Team	League	GP	G	A	Pts	PIM	GP	G	A	Pts	PIM
1977–78	Slovan ChZJD Bratislava	TCH	44	4	11	15	24	—	—	—	—	—
1978–79	Slovan ChZJD Bratislava	TCH
1979–80	Slovan ChZJD Bratislava	TCH	42	16	14	30	40	—	—	—	—	—
1980–81	Slovan ChZJD Bratislava	TCH	44	32	26	58	54	—	—	—	—	—
1981–82	Slovan ChZJD Bratislava	SVK II	—	31	29	60	—	—	—	—	—	—
1982–83	Slovan ChZJD Bratislava	TCH	42	19	14	33	52	—	—	—	—	—
1983–84	Slovan ChZJD Bratislava	TCH	40	23	22	45	100	—	—	—	—	—
1984–85	Slovan ChZJD Bratislava	TCH	37	16	15	31	56	—	—	—	—	—
1986–87	Slovan ChZJD Bratislava	TCH	40	18	20	38	62	—	—	—	—	—
1987–88	ASD Dukla Jihlava	TCH	44	17	34	51	—	—	—	—	—	—
1988–89	Slovan ChZJD Bratislava	TCH	25	11	13	24	44	—	—	—	—	—
1989–90	KalPa	SM-l	44	29	24	53	77	1	0	1	1	0
1990–91	KalPa	SM-l	44	22	38	60	58	8	3	3	6	8
1991–92	KalPa	SM-l	38	8	24	32	57	—	—	—	—	—
1992–93	KalPa	SM-l	43	20	24	44	57	—	—	—	—	—
TCH totals			358	156	169	325	432	—	—	—	—	—
SM-l totals			169	79	110	189	249	9	3	4	7	8

=== International ===
Year	Team	Event	GP	G	A	Pts	PIM
1978	Czechoslovakia	WJC	4	0	0	0	0
1979	Czechoslovakia	WJC	6	4	1	5	4
1981	Czechoslovakia	WC	8	3	3	6	4
1981	Czechoslovakia	CC	6	4	0	4	10
1982	Czechoslovakia	WC	7	2	1	3	0
1983	Czechoslovakia	WC	9	6	2	8	6
1984	Czechoslovakia	OG	7	4	5	9	6
1985	Czechoslovakia	WC	10	3	3	6	6
1986	Czechoslovakia	WC	10	1	2	3	4
Junior totals			10	4	1	5	4
Senior totals			57	23	16	39	36
