= Frank Musil =

Czech ice hockey player

- Born: December 17, 1964 (age 61) Pardubice, Czechoslovakia
- Height: 6 ft 3 in (191 cm)
- Weight: 215 lb (98 kg; 15 st 5 lb)
- Position: Defence
- Shot: Left
- Played for: Minnesota North Stars; Calgary Flames; Ottawa Senators; Edmonton Oilers
- National team: Czech Republic and Czechoslovakia
- NHL draft: 38th overall, 1983; Minnesota North Stars
- Playing career: 1980–2001

Frank Musil
Medal record

World Championships
Gold medal – first place	1985 Prague	Ice hockey
Silver medal – second place	1983 Germany	Ice hockey
Bronze medal – third place	1992	Ice hockey

František Musil (born December 17, 1964), more commonly known in North America as Frank Musil, is a Czech former professional ice hockey player who spent several seasons in the National Hockey League (NHL) with the Minnesota North Stars, Calgary Flames, Ottawa Senators, and Edmonton Oilers. Musil is currently an amateur scout for the Sabres and assistant coach for the Czech national ice hockey team.

== Playing career ==
Musil was selected in the second round of the 1983 NHL entry draft, 38th overall, by the Minnesota North Stars. He played on 1985 Gold Medal winning IIHF Men's World Championships for Czechoslovakia. In addition to playing in various professional European leagues, Musil played 797 games in the NHL, for Minnesota as well as the Calgary Flames, Ottawa Senators and Edmonton Oilers.

Musil's draft position fell, but not because of talent, as there was some uncertainty whether he would be able to escape Czechoslovakia, then a Communist country. Musil obtained a holiday visa and travelled to Yugoslavia with his girlfriend. Leaving her at the resort, Musil met with Minnesota General Manager Lou Nanne and player agent Ritch Winter, who had arranged for an American work visa. Winter and Nanne used the work visa to fool the border guards, who were unaware that Musil was a defecting hockey star. Thus, in the summer of 1986, Musil arrived in Minnesota, and began his NHL career that fall.

Musil retired from hockey at the end of the 2000–01 season, and was hired by the Oilers as a scout. Musil is married to former professional tennis player Andrea Holíková, who is the sister of former NHL player Bobby Holík.

Musil's son, David, is a professional hockey player who has played in the NHL for Edmonton Oilers. His son Adam was selected by St. Louis Blues as the 94th pick of the 2015 NHL entry draft. His daughter, Dana, played volleyball for the University at Buffalo Bulls.

== Awards ==
- World Junior Championship medals- silver (1982, 1983), bronze (1984)
- World Championship medals- silver (1983), gold (1985), and bronze (1992)

== Career statistics ==
=== Regular season and playoffs ===
			Regular season					Playoffs
Season	Team	League	GP	G	A	Pts	PIM	GP	G	A	Pts	PIM
1980–81	TJ Tesla Pardubice	CSSR	2	0	0	0	0	—	—	—	—	—
1981–82	TJ Tesla Pardubice	CSSR	35	1	3	4	34	—	—	—	—	—
1982–83	TJ Tesla Pardubice	CSSR	33	1	2	3	44	—	—	—	—	—
1983–84	TJ Tesla Pardubice	CSSR	37	4	8	12	72	—	—	—	—	—
1984–85	ASD Dukla Jihlava	CSSR	44	4	6	10	76	—	—	—	—	—
1985–86	ASD Dukla Jihlava	CSSR	34	4	7	11	42	—	—	—	—	—
1986–87	Minnesota North Stars	NHL	72	2	9	11	148	—	—	—	—	—
1987–88	Minnesota North Stars	NHL	80	9	8	17	213	—	—	—	—	—
1988–89	Minnesota North Stars	NHL	55	1	19	20	54	5	1	1	2	4
1989–90	Minnesota North Stars	NHL	56	2	8	10	109	4	0	0	0	14
1990–91	Minnesota North Stars	NHL	8	0	2	2	23	—	—	—	—	—
1990–91	Calgary Flames	NHL	67	7	14	21	160	7	0	0	0	10
1991–92	Calgary Flames	NHL	78	4	8	12	103	—	—	—	—	—
1992–93	Calgary Flames	NHL	80	6	10	16	131	6	1	1	2	7
1993–94	Calgary Flames	NHL	75	1	8	9	50	7	0	1	1	4
1994–95	HC Sparta Praha	CZE	19	1	4	5	50	—	—	—	—	—
1994–95	ESG Sachsen Weißwasser	DEL	1	0	0	0	2	—	—	—	—	—
1994–95	Calgary Flames	NHL	35	0	5	5	61	5	0	1	1	0
1995–96	Ottawa Senators	NHL	65	1	3	4	85	—	—	—	—	—
1995–96	HC Slavia Becherovka Karlovy Vary	CZE-2	16	7	4	11	16	—	—	—	—	—
1996–97	Ottawa Senators	NHL	57	0	5	5	58	—	—	—	—	—
1997–98	Edmonton Oilers	NHL	17	1	2	3	8	7	0	0	0	6
1997–98	Indianapolis Ice	IHL	52	5	8	13	122	—	—	—	—	—
1997–98	Detroit Vipers	IHL	9	0	0	0	6	—	—	—	—	—
1998–99	Edmonton Oilers	NHL	39	0	3	3	34	1	0	0	0	2
2000–01	Edmonton Oilers	NHL	13	0	2	2	4	—	—	—	—	—
2001–02	HC Dukla Jihlava	CZE-2	3	0	1	1	54	13	0	2	2	47
CSSR totals			185	14	26	40	268	—	—	—	—	—
NHL totals			797	34	106	140	1241	42	2	4	6	47

=== International ===
Year	Team	Event	GP	G	A	Pts	PIM
1981	Czechoslovakia	EJC	5	0	2	2	6
1982	Czechoslovakia	WJC	7	1	1	2	8
1982	Czechoslovakia	EJC	5	1	2	3	12
1983	Czechoslovakia	WJC	6	0	2	2	8
1983	Czechoslovakia	WC	4	0	1	1	6
1984	Czechoslovakia	WJC	7	0	2	2	10
1984	Czechoslovakia	CC	5	0	1	1	4
1985	Czechoslovakia	WC	10	1	1	2	12
1986	Czechoslovakia	WC	10	0	2	2	20
1991	Czechoslovakia	WC	10	2	0	2	20
1991	Czechoslovakia	CC	5	0	0	0	6
1992	Czechoslovakia	WC	7	3	1	4	26
1994	Czech Republic	WC	2	0	0	0	2
Junior totals			30	2	9	11	44
Senior totals			53	6	6	12	116
