= Miroslav Ihnačák =

Slovak former ice hockey player (born 1962)

- Born: November 19, 1962 (age 62) Poprad, Czechoslovakia
- Height: 5 ft 11 in (180 cm)
- Weight: 175 lb (79 kg; 12 st 7 lb)
- Position: Left wing
- Shot: Left
- Played for: Toronto Maple Leafs; Detroit Red Wings
- Coached for: Dunaújvárosi Acélbikák 2019-
- National team: Slovakia
- NHL draft: 171st overall, 1982; Toronto Maple Leafs
- Playing career: 1985–2006

Miroslav Ihnačák (born November 19, 1962) is a Slovak former ice hockey player. He played 56 games in the National Hockey League. He played for the Toronto Maple Leafs and Detroit Red Wings. Since 2020 he is the head coach for HC Merano. Miroslav is the brother of Peter Ihnačák.

== Career ==
Ihnačák was involved in a true Cold War style spy movie escape from behind the Iron Curtain in late 1985. Just prior to Christmas he and his girlfriend had been smuggled into Vienna, sneaking out of Czechoslovakia in the middle of the night without even bringing any baggage after Maple Leafs owner Harold Ballard spent over $100,000 to get the young superstar smuggled into Austria. There they were awaiting contact from Maple Leaf team officials including General Manager Gerry McNamara who was supposed to be arriving on a commercial flight, but there were reports of terrorists shooting in the airport forcing the plane to divert to another airfield causing the Maple Leaf officials to take a two-hour bus ride to make it back to the Austrian capital. From there further concerns arose including suspicions that the Czechoslovak secret police and even KGB agents were searching for Ihnačák to bring him back home, where he would have been put in prison for three years for the defection attempt. Then problems arose with immigration officials who claimed that Ihnačák would have to spend up to two months in a refugee camp to first apply for asylum in Austria; all of this going on while he and his girlfriend were hiding out in an anonymous Vienna apartment. Then on New Year's Eve reports of the immigration issues were leaked to the press prompting public backlash resulting in two Canadian politicians getting involved to immediately get the Slovak hockey player out on the soonest possible flight. The first available flight was around the other side of the world and on January 4, 1986, Ihnačák and his girlfriend Eva arrived in Vancouver.

Toronto had been off to a very bad start at the beginning of the 1985-86 NHL season and were one of the worst teams in the NHL with a record of 10-20-5. Leafs owner Harold Ballard naturally wanted to improve the fortunes of his team, while at the same time taking advantage of helping a persecuted athlete escape. Following the successful defection Ballard was quoted as saying, “Any communist that I could get out of there who wanted to be a Canadian, I'm very happy about it.”

Even after enduring such a stressful ordeal Ihnačák suited up and played for the Leafs during the second half of the season. He contributed as they attempted to make the playoffs playing in 21 games, scoring two goals and adding four assists. The Maple Leafs would end the season by qualifying for the final playoff spot in the Campbell Conference. While Ihnačák did not play in the postseason the Leafs upset the Norris Division champion Chicago Black Hawks and then gave the upstart St. Louis Blues everything they could handle before finally falling to them in seven games.

After retiring from hockey, Ihnaček became a coach. He has had head coaching stints at MHK Kezmarok, GKS Tychy, HK Spisska Nova Ves, HK Michalovce, HC Košice, TMH Polonia Bytom and Dunaújvárosi Acélbikák. He currently works as a head coach for HC Merano.

== Career statistics ==
=== Regular season and playoffs ===
			Regular season					Playoffs
Season	Team	League	GP	G	A	Pts	PIM	GP	G	A	Pts	PIM
1981–82	TJ VSŽ Košice	CSSR	41	22	11	33	28	—	—	—	—	—
1982–83	TJ VSŽ Košice	CSSR	42	20	17	37	32	—	—	—	—	—
1983–84	TJ VSŽ Košice	CSSR	42	19	25	44	34	—	—	—	—	—
1984–85	TJ VSŽ Košice	CSSR	43	35	31	66	68	—	—	—	—	—
1985–86	TJ VSŽ Košice	CSSR	21	16	16	32	—	—	—	—	—	—
1985–86	Toronto Maple Leafs	NHL	21	2	4	6	27	—	—	—	—	—
1985–86	St. Catharines Saints	AHL	13	4	4	8	2	—	—	—	—	—
1986–87	Toronto Maple Leafs	NHL	34	6	5	11	12	1	0	0	0	0
1986–87	Newmarket Saints	AHL	32	11	17	28	6	—	—	—	—	—
1987–88	Newmarket Saints	AHL	51	11	17	28	24	—	—	—	—	—
1988–89	Detroit Red Wings	NHL	1	0	0	0	0	—	—	—	—	—
1988–89	Adirondack Red Wings	AHL	62	34	37	71	32	—	—	—	—	—
1989–90	Halifax Citadels	AHL	57	33	37	70	43	—	—	—	—	—
1990–91	Halifax Citadels	AHL	77	38	57	95	42	—	—	—	—	—
1991–92	BSC Preussen	GER	26	8	12	20	24	—	—	—	—	—
1992–93	EV Zug	NDA	7	6	2	8	8	—	—	—	—	—
1992–93	Mannheimer ERC	GER	8	2	7	9	2	—	—	—	—	—
1992–93	TJ ŠKP PS Poprad	CSSR	10	7	2	9	2	—	—	—	—	—
1993–94	Milwaukee Admirals	IHL	1	0	0	0	0	—	—	—	—	—
1994–95	HC Košice	SVK	20	13	17	30	16	—	—	—	—	—
1995–96	ERC Selb	GER-2	44	39	68	107	63	—	—	—	—	—
1996–97	ERC Selb	GER-2	41	25	46	71	69	—	—	—	—	—
1997–98	ERC Selb	GER-2	24	14	16	30	6	—	—	—	—	—
1998–99	HC VSŽ Košice	SVK	42	12	19	41	20	—	—	—	—	—
1999–00	HC VSŽ Košice	SVK	49	15	22	37	34	—	—	—	—	—
2000–01	HC Košice	SVK	50	17	35	52	34	—	—	—	—	—
2001–02	HC Košice	SVK	49	21	31	52	30	—	—	—	—	—
2002–03	HC Košice	SVK	52	22	20	42	42	—	—	—	—	—
2003–04	HC Košice	SVK	53	11	24	35	26	—	—	—	—	—
2004–05	HC ŠKP Poprad	SVK	52	11	18	29	28	5	0	3	3	8
2005–06	MHC Martin	SVK	10	1	2	3	6	—	—	—	—	—
CSSR totals			199	119	102	221	164	—	—	—	—	—
SVK totals			377	123	198	321	236	5	0	3	3	8
NHL totals			56	8	9	17	39	1	0	0	0	0

=== International ===
Year	Team	Event	GP	G	A	Pts	PIM
1979	Czechoslovakia	EJC
1980	Czechoslovakia	EJC	5	4	4	8	0
1995	Slovakia	WC B	7	7	1	8	2
