= Jaroslav Benák =

- Born: 3 April 1962 (age 63); Havlíčkův Brod, Czechoslovakia
- Height: 6 ft 0 in (183 cm)
- Weight: 187 lb (85 kg; 13 st 5 lb)
- Position: Defense
- Shot: Left
- Played for: ASD Dukla Jihlava; SaiPa; SG Cortina; AC ZPS Zlín; Chamonix HC; BK Havlíčkův Brod; EC Peiting; EHC Memmingen
- National team: Czechoslovakia
- NHL draft: 211th overall, 1983; Calgary Flames
- Playing career: 1981–2002

Jaroslav Benák (born 3 April 1962 in Havlíčkův Brod, Czechoslovakia) is an ice hockey player who played for the Czechoslovak national team. He won a silver medal at the 1984 Winter Olympics.

== Career statistics ==
=== Regular season and playoffs ===
			Regular season					Playoffs
Season	Team	League	GP	G	A	Pts	PIM	GP	G	A	Pts	PIM
1981–82	ASD Dukla Jihlava	TCH	40	9	5	14	—	—	—	—	—	—
1982–83	ASD Dukla Jihlava	TCH	43	1	10	11	22	—	—	—	—	—
1983–84	ASD Dukla Jihlava	TCH	42	5	8	13	36	—	—	—	—	—
1984–85	ASD Dukla Jihlava	TCH	33	1	8	9	20	—	—	—	—	—
1986–87	ASD Dukla Jihlava	TCH	43	4	8	12	46	—	—	—	—	—
1987–88	ASD Dukla Jihlava	TCH	37	6	14	20	0	—	—	—	—	—
1988–89	ASD Dukla Jihlava	TCH	40	3	9	12	34	—	—	—	—	—
1989–90	ASD Dukla Jihlava	TCH	47	6	13	19	—	—	—	—	—	—
1990–91	SaiPa	Liiga	44	13	15	28	18	—	—	—	—	—
1991–92	SaiPa	FIN II	27	7	16	23	48	—	—	—	—	—
1991–92	SG Cortina	ITA II	11	4	13	17	4	—	—	—	—	—
1992–93	SG Cortina	ITA II
1993–94	AC ZPS Zlín	ELH	43	8	14	22	32	1	0	0	0	0
1994–95	HC Dukla Jihlava	ELH	35	3	7	10	18	—	—	—	—	—
1995–96	Chamonix HC	FRA	26	3	8	11	22	7	1	3	4	4
1996–97	BK Havlíčkův Brod	CZE II	45	3	14	17	—	—	—	—	—	—
1997–98	BK Havlíčkův Brod	CZE II	40	1	4	5	—	—	—	—	—	—
1998–99	EC Peiting	DEU IV	44	15	34	49	32	—	—	—	—	—
1999–2000	EHC Memmingen	DEU IV	51	4	35	39	70	—	—	—	—	—
2000–01	EHC Memmingen	DEU IV	36	9	21	30	30	—	—	—	—	—
2001–02	EHC Memmingen	DEU III	18	1	3	4	14	—	—	—	—	—
2001–02	HC Rebel Havlíčkův Brod	CZE III	8	2	2	4	4	3	0	1	1	10
TCH totals			325	31	79	110	158	—	—	—	—	—
ELH totals			78	11	21	32	50	1	0	0	0	0
DEU IV totals			131	28	90	118	132	—	—	—	—	—

=== International ===
Jaroslav Benák
Medal record

Representing Czechoslovakia

Men's Ice Hockey
Silver medal – second place	1984 Sarajevo	Team

Year	Team	Event	GP	G	A	Pts	PIM
1983	Czechoslovakia	WC	10	0	5	5	6
1984	Czechoslovakia	OG	7	1	1	2	4
1984	Czechoslovakia	CC	4	0	0	0	4
1985	Czechoslovakia	WC	10	1	3	4	14
1986	Czechoslovakia	WC	6	0	1	1	6
1987	Czechoslovakia	WC	10	0	2	2	10
1987	Czechoslovakia	CC	6	2	2	4	6
1988	Czechoslovakia	OG	8	1	4	5	12
Senior totals			61	5	18	23	62
