= Vincent Lukáč =

Slovak ice hockey player

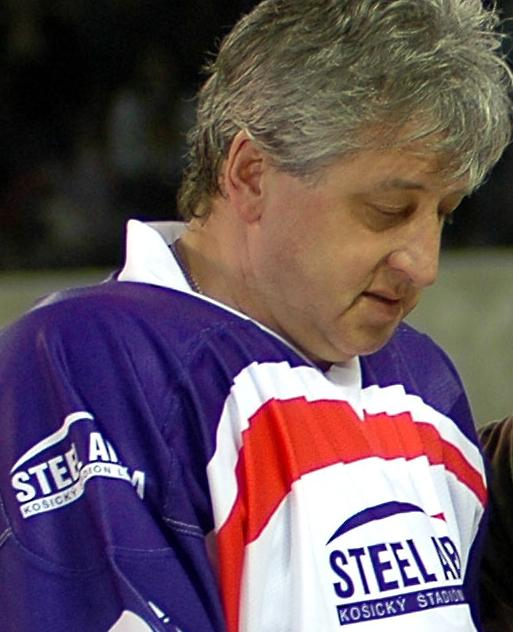
- Vincent Lukáč (2006)
- Born: 14 February 1954 (age 71); Košice, Czechoslovakia
- Height: 5 ft 10 in (178 cm)
- Weight: 165 lb (75 kg; 11 st 11 lb)
- Position: Left wing
- Shot: Left
- Played for: HC Košice; HC Dukla Jihlava
- National team: Czechoslovakia
- NHL draft: 202nd overall, 1982; Quebec Nordiques
- Playing career: 1971–1990

Vincent Lukáč (born 14 February 1954 in Košice) is a former professional Slovak ice hockey player, coach and politician.

He was a player of HC Košice (the most successful player in history of the team - 14 seasons, 518 games, 393 goals), HC Dukla Jihlava, SC Rosenheim, WEV Wien, Fife Flyers of Scotland (alongside compatriots Milan Figala and Jindřich Kokrment) and Streatham Redskins in London. He had been drafted by the Quebec Nordiques in 1982 at the age of 28, but never played the NHL.

He was a coach of HC Košice, the Slovak national ice hockey team (assistant) and MsHK Žilina, Slovakia.

Lukáč resides in Košice. He is the father-in-law of Stanley Cup-winning hockey player Jiří Bicek. In 2004, he was inducted into the Slovak Hockey Hall of Fame. Outside of ice hockey, he contested Let's Dance.

== Political career ==
In 2010 Slovak parliamentary election, he was elected to the National Council on the list of the Slovak National Party. He also served as a municipal deputy in the Old Town borough of Košice. As an MP, he caused controversy by claiming he had good relationship with mafia members. After widespread criticism, Lukáč clarified it was meant to be a joke.

== Career statistics ==
=== Regular season and playoffs ===
			Regular season					Playoffs
Season	Team	League	GP	G	A	Pts	PIM	GP	G	A	Pts	PIM
1971–72	TJ VSŽ Košice	TCH	31	4	5	9	10	—	—	—	—	—
1972–73	TJ VSŽ Košice	TCH
1973–74	TJ VSŽ Košice	TCH
1974–75	TJ VSŽ Košice	TCH
1975–76	TJ VSŽ Košice	TCH
1976–77	TJ VSŽ Košice	TCH	44	48	34	82	—	—	—	—	—	—
1977–78	TJ VSŽ Košice	TCH	42	36	25	61	51	—	—	—	—	—
1978–79	TJ VSŽ Košice	TCH	38	27	25	52	21	—	—	—	—	—
1979–80	TJ VSŽ Košice	TCH	41	43	21	64	36	—	—	—	—	—
1980–81	TJ VSŽ Košice	TCH	35	29	29	58	12	—	—	—	—	—
1981–82	ASD Dukla Jihlava	TCH	37	22	10	32	51	—	—	—	—	—
1982–83	TJ VSŽ Košice	TCH	42	49	19	68	46	—	—	—	—	—
1983–84	TJ VSŽ Košice	TCH	41	30	20	50	34	—	—	—	—	—
1984–85	TJ VSŽ Košice	TCH	38	28	19	47	18	—	—	—	—	—
1985–86	Sportbund DJK Rosenheim	1.GBun	41	32	24	56	4	—	—	—	—	—
1986–87	Sportbund DJK Rosenheim	1.GBun	38	23	29	52	2	—	—	—	—	—
1987–88	Wiener EV	AUT	31	31	24	55	2	—	—	—	—	—
1988–89	Fife Flyers	GBR	34	88	73	161	34	4	6	4	10	2
1989–90	Streatham Redskins	GBR II	28	71	51	122	30	—	—	—	—	—
TCH totals			389	316	207	523	279	—	—	—	—	—

=== International ===
Vincent Lukáč
Medal record

Representing Czechoslovakia

Men's ice hockey

Olympic Games
Silver medal – second place	1984 Sarajevo	Team competition

Year	Team	Event	GP	G	A	Pts	PIM
1972	Czechoslovakia	EJC	—	5	1	6	—
1973	Czechoslovakia	EJC	5	6	3	9	0
1977	Czechoslovakia	WC	7	0	1	1	2
1980	Czechoslovakia	OG	6	2	7	9	0
1982	Czechoslovakia	WC	10	5	3	8	0
1983	Czechoslovakia	WC	10	5	1	6	2
1984	Czechoslovakia	OG	7	4	3	7	2
1984	Czechoslovakia	CC	5	3	0	3	0
1985	Czechoslovakia	WC	8	3	4	7	0
Senior totals			53	22	19	41	6

Awards
Preceded by Milan Nový	Golden Hockey Stick; 1983	Succeeded by Igor Liba
