= Milan Chalupa =

Czech ice hockey player (born 1953)

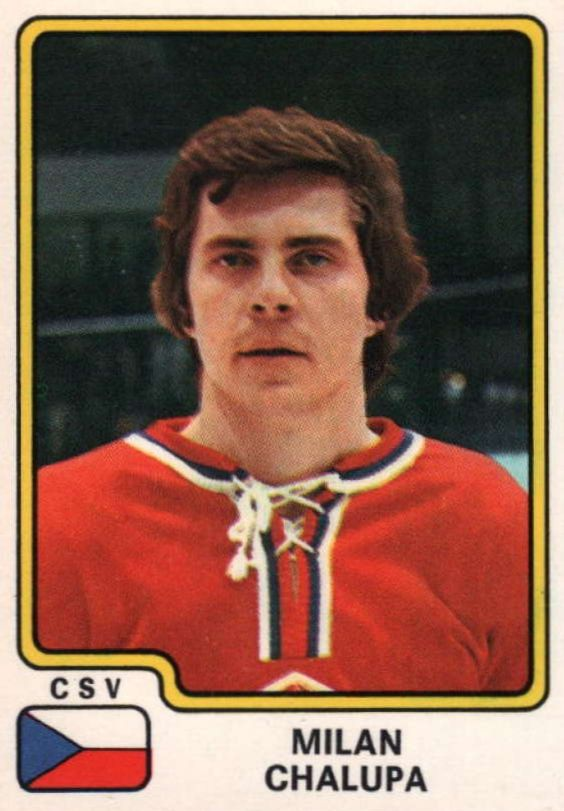
- Born: 4 July 1953 (age 73) Oudoleň, Czechoslovakia
- Height: 5 ft 10 in (178 cm)
- Weight: 185 lb (84 kg; 13 st 3 lb)
- Position: Defence
- Shot: Right
- Played for: HC Dukla Jihlava; Detroit Red Wings
- NHL draft: 49th overall, 1984; Detroit Red Wings
- Playing career: 1973–1994
Medal record
Men's ice hockey
Representing Czechoslovakia
Olympic Games
Silver medal – second place	1976 Innsbruck	Team
Silver medal – second place	1984 Sarajevo	Team

Milan Chalupa (born 4 July 1953) is a Czech former professional ice hockey defenceman. He played 14 games for the Detroit Red Wings in the National Hockey League during the 1984–85 season. Internationally he played for the Czechoslovak national team at several World Championships and at three Winter Olympics, winning silver at the 1976 and 1984 Winter Olympics.

== Career ==
Chalupa began his career with HC Dukla Jihlava. He was drafted 49th overall by the Detroit Red Wings in the 1984 NHL entry draft and played 14 games during the 1984-85 NHL season, contributing five assists. He moved to Germany in 1985 with EHC Freiburg.

He competed for Czechoslovakia at the 1976 Winter Olympics and 1984 Winter Olympics, where the teams won the silver medal.

== Career statistics ==
=== Regular season and playoffs ===
			Regular season					Playoffs
Season	Team	League	GP	G	A	Pts	PIM	GP	G	A	Pts	PIM
1973–74	ASD Dukla Jihlava	CSSR	—	6	8	14	—	—	—	—	—	—
1974–75	ASD Dukla Jihlava	CSSR	—	4	7	11	—	—	—	—	—	—
1976–77	ASD Dukla Jihlava	CSSR	—	5	8	13	—	—	—	—	—	—
1977–78	ASD Dukla Jihlava	CSSR	39	1	8	9	108	—	—	—	—	—
1978–79	ASD Dukla Jihlava	CSSR	38	3	3	6	38	—	—	—	—	—
1979–80	ASD Dukla Jihlava	CSSR	43	8	6	14	46	6	0	3	3	8
1980–81	ASD Dukla Jihlava	CSSR	41	2	15	17	34	5	0	1	1	4
1981–82	ASD Dukla Jihlava	CSSR	41	4	8	12	30	—	—	—	—	—
1982–83	ASD Dukla Jihlava	CSSR	38	9	16	25	36	—	—	—	—	—
1983–84	ASD Dukla Jihlava	CSSR	39	3	11	14	52	—	—	—	—	—
1984–85	Detroit Red Wings	NHL	14	0	5	5	6	—	—	—	—	—
1984–85	Adirondack Red Wings	AHL	1	0	0	0	2	—	—	—	—	—
1985–86	EHC Freiburg	GER-2	35	9	22	31	40	16	1	6	7	12
1986–87	EHC Freiburg	GER-2	53	17	38	55	66	—	—	—	—	—
1987–88	EHC Freiburg	GER-2	31	9	31	40	36	18	2	22	24	16
1988–89	EHC Freiburg	GER	31	0	14	14	24	—	—	—	—	—
1989–90	EHC Freiburg	GER	33	6	23	29	24	17	4	7	11	12
1990–91	EHC Freiburg	GER	10	0	1	1	10	—	—	—	—	—
1992–93	EHC Freiburg	GER	—	—	—	—	—	5	0	0	0	2
1993–94	ASD Dukla Jihlava	ELH	12	0	4	4	6	—	—	—	—	—
CSSR totals			279	30	67	97	346	11	0	4	4	12
NHL totals			14	0	5	5	6	—	—	—	—	—

- CSSR totals do not include numbers from the 1973–74 to 1976–77 seasons.

=== International ===
Year	Team	Event	GP	G	A	Pts	PIM
1976	Czechoslovakia	OLY	6	0	1	1	4
1976	Czechoslovakia	WC	7	1	4	5	2
1976	Czechoslovakia	CC	7	1	1	2	10
1977	Czechoslovakia	WC	10	0	0	0	2
1978	Czechoslovakia	WC	3	1	0	1	0
1979	Czechoslovakia	WC	8	1	2	3	10
1980	Czechoslovakia	OLY	6	0	3	3	8
1981	Czechoslovakia	WC	5	0	1	1	4
1981	Czechoslovakia	CC	6	0	2	2	4
1982	Czechoslovakia	WC	10	0	1	1	2
1983	Czechoslovakia	WC	8	2	1	3	2
1984	Czechoslovakia	OLY	7	1	0	1	6
Senior totals			83	7	16	23	54
