= Peter Ihnačák =

Slovak hockey player (born 1957)

- Born: May 3, 1957 (age 69) Poprad, Czechoslovakia
- Height: 5 ft 11 in (180 cm)
- Weight: 180 lb (82 kg; 12 st 12 lb)
- Position: Centre
- Shot: Right
- Played for: ASD Dukla Jihlava; TJ Sparta ČKD Praha; EC Hedos München; Toronto Maple Leafs; EHC Freiburg; HC Ajoie; Krefeld Pinguine
- National team: Czechoslovakia
- NHL draft: 25th overall, 1982; Toronto Maple Leafs
- Playing career: 1978–1997

Peter Ihnačák (born May 3, 1957) is a Slovak former professional ice hockey centre. He initially played in the Czechoslovak First Ice Hockey League before defecting during the Cold War and joining the Toronto Maple Leafs of the National Hockey League (NHL). He played eight seasons with the Maple Leafs.

== Playing career ==
A star in Czechoslovakia, Ihnačák was prohibited from playing outside of the Communist bloc because members of his family had already fled the country after the Soviet invasion during the Prague Spring in 1968. He was to play in the 1980 Winter Olympics at Lake Placid, New York but was removed from the team because he was considered a flight risk. During the 1982 IIHF World Championship in Helsinki, Finland, he got on the same plane as then Toronto Maple Leafs general manager Gerry McNamara. On the plane, McNamara was tipped off that Ihnačák intended to defect and the Maple Leafs used their second round selection, 25th overall that they had received in the Darryl Sittler trade to pick him in the 1982 NHL entry draft. At the World Championship, Ihnačák defected with the help of his brother John. He was in the opening night lineup of the 1982–83 NHL season, playing on a line with Walt Poddubny and Miroslav Fryčer. In his first year with the Maple Leafs, he amassed a total of 66 points (28 goals and 38 assists), the rookie record within the Maple Leafs organization until it was passed by Auston Matthews in 2017. He went on to play eight seasons with the Toronto Maple Leafs of the National Hockey League (NHL) until 1990.

In Europe, he played with the teams of ŠKP Poprad (Slovakia), HC Dukla Jihlava, HC Sparta Prague (both in the Czech Republic), Freiburg and Krefeld Pinguine (both in Germany).

== Post-playing career ==
He was also the head coach of the team of Nuremberg Ice Tigers (Germany). Ihnačák was a former scout for the Toronto Maple Leafs and later became a European-based scout for the Washington Capitals.

== Personal life ==
Ihnačák's younger brother, Miroslav Ihnačák, was selected by the Maple Leafs in the 1982 NHL entry draft. After Ihnačák defected, Miroslav was forbidden to play in international tournaments, for fears he may defect as well. This did not stop him, as he would join his brother and the Maple Leafs in December 1985. Miroslav would play parts of two seasons with the Maple Leafs, and one game with the Detroit Red Wings, before returning to Europe and finishing his career in Slovakia in 2006.

== Career statistics ==
=== Regular season and playoffs ===
			Regular season					Playoffs
Season	Team	League	GP	G	A	Pts	PIM	GP	G	A	Pts	PIM
1977–78	ASD Dukla Jihlava	CSSR	8	0	3	3	6	—	—	—	—	—
1978–79	TJ Sparta ČKD Praha	CSSR	42	22	12	34	14	—	—	—	—	—
1979–80	TJ Sparta ČKD Praha	CSSR	44	22	12	34	18	—	—	—	—	—
1980–81	TJ Sparta ČKD Praha	CSSR	44	23	22	45	22	—	—	—	—	—
1981–82	TJ Sparta ČKD Praha	CSSR	39	16	22	38	30	—	—	—	—	—
1982–83	Toronto Maple Leafs	NHL	80	28	38	66	44	—	—	—	—	—
1983–84	Toronto Maple Leafs	NHL	47	10	13	23	24	—	—	—	—	—
1984–85	Toronto Maple Leafs	NHL	70	22	22	44	24	—	—	—	—	—
1985–86	Toronto Maple Leafs	NHL	63	18	27	45	16	10	2	3	5	12
1986–87	Toronto Maple Leafs	NHL	58	12	27	39	16	13	2	4	6	9
1986–87	Newmarket Saints	AHL	8	2	6	8	0	—	—	—	—	—
1987–88	Toronto Maple Leafs	NHL	68	10	20	30	41	5	0	3	3	4
1988–89	Toronto Maple Leafs	NHL	26	2	16	18	10	—	—	—	—	—
1988–89	Newmarket Saints	AHL	38	14	16	30	8	—	—	—	—	—
1989–90	Toronto Maple Leafs	NHL	5	0	2	2	0	—	—	—	—	—
1989–90	Newmarket Saints	AHL	72	26	47	73	40	—	—	—	—	—
1990–91	EC Hedos München	GER	20	6	17	23	23	—	—	—	—	—
1990–91	EHC Freiburg	GER	10	5	5	10	12	—	—	—	—	—
1991–92	EHC Freiburg	GER	41	21	26	47	34	4	0	0	0	4
1991–92	HC Ajoie	NDA	—	—	—	—	—	1	0	0	0	0
1992–93	HC Ajoie	NDA	13	3	9	12	10	—	—	—	—	—
1992–93	Krefelder EV 1981	GER	15	5	5	10	10	4	1	3	4	2
1993–94	Krefelder EV 1981	GER	42	10	25	35	25	5	3	2	5	6
1994–95	Krefelder EV 1981	DEL	19	7	6	13	8	15	2	4	6	16
1995–96	Krefeld Pinguine	DEL	47	9	34	43	22	5	1	4	5	2
1996–97	Krefeld Pinguine	DEL	48	20	17	37	30	3	1	0	1	4
CSSR totals			177	83	71	154	90	—	—	—	—	—
NHL totals			417	102	165	267	175	28	4	10	14	25

=== International ===
Year	Team	Event	GP	G	A	Pts	PIM
1976	Czechoslovakia	EJC
1977	Czechoslovakia	WJC	7	2	5	7	0
1982	Czechoslovakia	WC	4	0	0	0	0
