= František Černík =

Czech ice hockey player

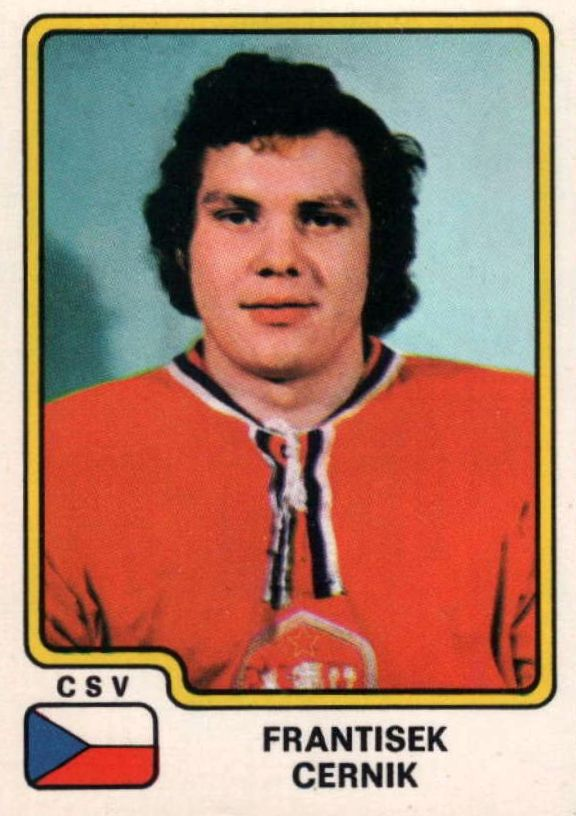
- Born: 3 June 1953 (age 72) Nový Jičín, Czechoslovakia
- Height: 5 ft 10 in (178 cm)
- Weight: 190 lb (86 kg; 13 st 8 lb)
- Position: Right Wing
- Shot: Right
- Played for: VEU Feldkirch; ESV Kaufbeuren; Detroit Red Wings; TJ Vítkovice; ASD Dukla Jihlava; TJ VŽKG Ostrava
- National team: Czechoslovakia
- NHL draft: Undrafted
- Playing career: 1976–1989

František Černík (born 3 June 1953) is a Czech former ice hockey player who represented Czechoslovakia. Most of his career was spent in the Czechoslovak First Ice Hockey League with TJ Vítkovice, where he played from 1978 to 1984. He played for the Czechoslovakia All-Stars that played all eight World Hockey Association teams for one game apiece in December 1977 of the 1977–78 WHA season. He scored four goals and three assists in the eight games.

He also spent the 1984–85 season with the Detroit Red Wings of the National Hockey League, and three subsequent years split between Germany and Austria, before retiring in 1989. After his playing career finished Černík became general manager of TJ Vítkovice, holding that position until 2004. He became president of the club in 2004, a position he held until 2011, and purchased majority control of the club in 2005, owning it until 2016. He was again named president in 2017. Internationally Černík represented the Czechoslovakia national team at several tournaments, including multiple World Championships, two Canada Cups, and the 1984 Winter Olympics, where he won a silver medal.

== Career statistics ==
=== Regular season and playoffs ===
			Regular season					Playoffs
Season	Team	League	GP	G	A	Pts	PIM	GP	G	A	Pts	PIM
1975–76	TJ VŽKG Ostrava	CSSR	32	18	18	36	—	—	—	—	—	—
1976–77	ASD Dukla Jihlava	CSSR	45	30	13	43	30	—	—	—	—	—
1977–78	ASD Dukla Jihlava	CSSR	41	14	14	28	44	—	—	—	—	—
1978–79	TJ Vítkovice	CSSR	44	24	15	39	—	—	—	—	—	—
1979–80	TJ Vítkovice	CSSR	42	16	12	28	48	—	—	—	—	—
1980–81	TJ Vítkovice	CSSR	43	25	26	51	40	—	—	—	—	—
1981–82	TJ Vítkovice	CSSR	51	28	23	51	50	10	1	5	6	4
1982–83	TJ Vítkovice	CSSR	44	23	27	50	39	—	—	—	—	—
1983–84	TJ Vítkovice	CSSR	44	25	23	48	44	—	—	—	—	—
1984–85	Detroit Red Wings	NHL	49	5	4	9	13	—	—	—	—	—
1985–86	ESV Kaufbeuren	GER	40	23	44	67	21	—	—	—	—	—
1986–87	VEU Feldkirch	AUT	39	23	37	60	23	—	—	—	—	—
1987–88	ATSE Graz	AUT-2	30	64	40	104	—	—	—	—	—	—
1988–89	HC Frýdek-Místek	CSSR-4	—	—	—	—	—	—	—	—	—	—
NHL totals			49	5	4	9	13	—	—	—	—	—
CSSR totals			376	203	171	374	295	10	1	5	6	4

=== International ===
Olympic medal record

Representing Czechoslovakia

Men's ice hockey
Silver medal – second place	1984 Sarajevo	Ice hockey

Year	Team	Event	GP	G	A	Pts	PIM
1971	Czechoslovakia	EJC	—	—	—	—	—
1972	Czechoslovakia	EJC	—	—	—	—	—
1976	Czechoslovakia	WC	8	3	3	6	2
1976	Czechoslovakia	CC	5	0	1	1	4
1978	Czechoslovakia	WC	8	7	1	8	2
1981	Czechoslovakia	WC	8	2	0	2	2
1981	Czechoslovakia	CC	6	0	0	0	0
1982	Czechoslovakia	WC	10	1	5	6	4
1983	Czechoslovakia	WC	10	1	3	4	8
1984	Czechoslovakia	OG	7	3	0	3	4
Senior totals			62	17	13	30	26
