= Rosol =

Rosol (Czech feminine: Rosolová), or Rosół, is a surname. Notable people with the surname include:

- Cecily Rosol, Australian politician
- Rosol Wahid, Malaysian politician
- Lukáš Rosol (born 1985), Czech tennis player
- Petr Rosol (born 1964), Czech ice hockey player
- Denisa Rosolová (born 1986), Czech athlete
- Martin Rosol (1956), Czech glass sculptor
