= Martin Forster =

Martin Forster may refer to:

- Martin Förster (born 1966), Czech luger
- Martin Onslow Forster (1872–1945), British chemist in India
