= Stanislav Ptáčník =

Czech luger (born 1956)

Personal information
- Nationality: Czech
- Born: 6 June 1956 (age 68); Tanvald, Czechoslovakia

Sport
- Sport: Luge

Stanislav Ptáčník (born 6 June 1956) is a Czech luger. He competed at the 1976 Winter Olympics and the 1984 Winter Olympics.
