= Martin Förster =

Czech luger (born 1966)

Personal information
- Nationality: Czech
- Born: 14 April 1966 (age 58); Jablonec nad Nisou, Czechoslovakia

Sport
- Sport: Luge

Martin Förster (born 14 April 1966) is a Czech luger. He competed in the men's singles and the doubles events at the 1984 Winter Olympics.
