= 1977 World Junior Ice Hockey Championships =

1977 IIHF World Junior Championship
Tournament details
- Host country: Czechoslovakia
- Venues: 2 (in 2 host cities)
- Dates: December 22, 1976 – January 2, 1977
- Teams: 8

Final positions
- Champions: Soviet Union (1st title)
- Runners-up: Canada
- Third place: Czechoslovakia
- Fourth place: Finland

Tournament statistics
- Games played: 28
- Goals scored: 251 (8.96 per game)
- Attendance: 53,172 (1,899 per game)
- Scoring leader: (Canada) Dale McCourt (18 points)

The 1977 World Junior Ice Hockey Championships (1977 WJHC) were held between December 22, 1976, and January 2, 1977, in Banská Bystrica and Zvolen, Czechoslovakia. The Soviet team won the tournament with a perfect 7–0 record. This was the fourth edition of the Ice Hockey World Junior Championship, but the first to be included in official IIHF records. Canada was represented by the 1976 Memorial Cup champions St. Catharines Fincups with eight additions from other OHA teams, but the other seven nations were represented by teams of their top under-20 players. The tournament was expanded to eight teams, with West Germany and Poland making their debut.

== Final standings ==
The tournament was a round-robin format, with each team playing each of the other seven teams once each.

Pos	Team	Pld	W	L	D	GF	GA	GD	Pts
1	Soviet Union	7	7	0	0	51	19	+32	14
2	Canada	7	5	1	1	50	20	+30	11
3	Czechoslovakia	7	4	2	1	32	17	+15	9
4	Finland	7	4	3	0	35	29	+6	8
5	Sweden	7	3	4	0	28	30	−2	6
6	West Germany	7	2	5	0	18	33	−15	4
7	United States	7	1	5	1	25	45	−20	3
8	Poland	7	0	6	1	12	58	−46	1

Source: Hockey Canada

While not relegated, Poland did have the opportunity to play a challenge against Switzerland for inclusion in the 1978 World Junior Ice Hockey Championships, but declined.

== Results ==
December 22, 1976	United States	3 – 6 (2–3, 0–0, 1–3)	Finland	Banská Bystrica

December 23, 1976	Czechoslovakia	0 – 4 (0–0, 0–2, 0–2)	Soviet Union	Banská Bystrica

December 23, 1976	Poland	0 – 14 (0–3, 0–5, 0–6)	Canada	Banská Bystrica

December 23, 1976	Sweden	5 – 4 (1–2, 1–0, 3–2)	Finland	Zvolen

December 23, 1976	United States	3 – 4 (1–2, 0–2, 2–0)	West Germany	Zvolen

December 25, 1976	West Germany	1 – 4	Finland	Banská Bystrica

December 25, 1976	United States	8 – 5	Sweden	Banská Bystrica

December 25, 1976	Canada	4 – 4	Czechoslovakia	Zvolen

December 25, 1976	Soviet Union	10 – 1 (3–0, 3–1, 4–0)	Poland	Zvolen

December 26, 1976	Czechoslovakia	8 – 2 (2–1, 3–0, 3–1)	West Germany	Banská Bystrica

December 26, 1976	Poland	2 – 2	United States	Banská Bystrica

December 26, 1976	Canada	6 – 4 (2–1, 2–2, 2–1)	Finland	Zvolen

December 26, 1976	Sweden	2 – 4 (0–1, 2–3, 0–0)	Soviet Union	Zvolen

December 28, 1976	Canada	5 – 3	Sweden	Banská Bystrica

December 28, 1976	Soviet Union	2 – 1 (1–0, 1–1, 0–0)	West Germany	Banská Bystrica

December 28, 1976	Finland	8 – 2 (2–1, 3–0, 3–1)	Poland	Zvolen

December 28, 1976	United States	2 – 5 (1–1, 1–2, 0–2)	Czechoslovakia	Zvolen

December 29, 1976	West Germany	1 – 9 (0–2, 1–2, 0–5)	Canada	Banská Bystrica

December 29, 1976	Sweden	6 – 5 (2–1, 1–3, 3–1)	Poland	Zvolen

December 30, 1976	Soviet Union	15 – 5 (6–1, 6–1, 3–3)	United States	Banská Bystrica

December 30, 1976	Czechoslovakia	2 – 3 (1–0, 1–3, 0–0)	Finland	Zvolen

January 1, 1977	Finland	6 – 10 (0–3, 2–3, 4–4)	Soviet Union	Banská Bystrica

January 1, 1977	Poland	0 – 9 (0–3, 0–2, 0–4)	Czechoslovakia	Banská Bystrica

January 1, 1977	Canada	8 – 2 (3–2, 2–0, 3–0)	United States	Zvolen

January 1, 1977	West Germany	0 – 5 (0–1, 0–4, 0–0)	Sweden	Zvolen

January 2, 1977	Czechoslovakia	4 – 2 (2–0, 0–0, 2–2)	Sweden	Banská Bystrica

January 2, 1977	Soviet Union	6 – 4 (6–0, 0–0, 0–4)	Canada	Zvolen

January 2, 1977	West Germany	9 – 2 (3–0, 5–1, 1–1)	Poland	Zvolen

== Scoring leaders ==
Rank	Player	Country	G	A	Pts
1	Dale McCourt	Canada	10	8	18
2	John Anderson	Canada	11	5	16
3	Igor Romashin	Soviet Union	6	6	12
4	Juha Jyrkkiö	Finland	7	4	11
5	Aleksei Frolikov	Soviet Union	6	5	11
6	Erkki Laine	Finland	5	4	9
7	Joe Contini	Canada	4	5	9
7	Gerd Truntschka	West Germany	4	5	9
9	Dave Hunter	Canada	6	2	8
9	Jaroslav Korbela	Czechoslovakia	6	2	8

== Tournament awards ==
	IIHF Directorate Awards	Media All-Star Team
Goaltender	(Czechoslovakia) Jan Hrabák	(Soviet Union) Alexander Tyzhnykh
Defencemen	(Soviet Union) Viacheslav Fetisov	(Soviet Union) Viacheslav Fetisov (Finland) Risto Siltanen
Forwards	(Canada) Dale McCourt	(Canada) Dale McCourt (Soviet Union) Igor Romashin (Sweden) Bengt-Åke Gustafsson
