= 1989–90 Czechoslovak Extraliga season =

Czechoslovak ice hockey season

The 1989–90 Czechoslovak Extraliga season was the 47th season of the Czechoslovak Extraliga, the top level of ice hockey in Czechoslovakia. 12 teams participated in the league, and Sparta CKD Prague won the championship.

== Regular season ==
Pl.	Team	GP	W	T	L	GF–GA	Pts
1.	Dukla Jihlava	44	28	5	11	190:101	61
2.	VSŽ Košice	44	25	9	10	189:141	59
3.	Dukla Trenčín	44	25	3	16	188:176	53
4.	Sparta ČKD Prague	44	23	7	14	162:120	53
5.	TJ Vítkovice	44	20	6	18	156:161	46
6.	AC ZPS Zlín	44	17	10	17	144:153	44
7.	Poldi SONP Kladno	44	15	11	18	169:179	41
8.	CHZ Litvínov	44	18	3	23	192:205	39
9.	Motor České Budějovice	44	15	6	23	146:189	36
10.	TJ Škoda Plzeň	44	13	8	23	136:156	34
11.	Tesla Pardubice	44	14	6	24	183:216	34
12.	Zetor Brno	44	10	10	24	123:181	30

== Playoffs ==
=== Quarterfinal ===
- Dukla Jihlava – CHZ Litvínov 6:2 (0:1,3:0,3:1)
- CHZ Litvínov – Dukla Jihlava 6:2 (2:0,2:2,2:0)
- Dukla Jihlava – CHZ Litvínov 3:5 (1:3,2:1,0:1)
- VSŽ Košice – Poldi Kladno 1:2 (0:0,0:1,1:1)
- Poldi Kladno – VSŽ Košice 5:3 (1:1,2:2,2:0)
- Dukla Trenčín – TJ Gottwaldov/SK Zlín 4:3 SN (0:0,1:2,2:1,0:0)
- TJ Gottwaldov/SK Zlín – Dukla Trenčín 2:3 (0:2,0:1,2:0)
- Sparta Praha – TJ Vítkovice 2:0 (2:0,0:0,0:0)
- TJ Vítkovice – Sparta Praha 4:6 (2:2,0:1,2:3)

=== Semifinal ===
- Dukla Trenčín – CHZ Litvínov 5:4 SN (4:1,0:0,0:3.0:0)
- Dukla Trenčín – CHZ Litvínov 7:2 (2:1,3:1,2:0)
- CHZ Litvínov – Dukla Trenčín 3:7 (1:4,0:1,2:2)
- Sparta Praha – Poldi Kladno 5:1 (1:1,2:0,2:0)
- Sparta Praha – Poldi Kladno 3:4 (2:1,0:1,1:2)
- Poldi Kladno – Sparta Praha 2:5 (1:1,0:1,1:3)
- Poldi Kladno – Sparta Praha 5:2 (1:1,0:1,4:0)
- Sparta Praha – Poldi Kladno 4:1 (1:0,1:0,2:1)

=== Final ===
- Dukla Trenčín – Sparta Praha 1:5 (1:1,0:1,0:3)
- Dukla Trenčín – Sparta Praha 2:4 (2:1,0:1,0:2)
- Sparta Praha – Dukla Trenčín 0:2 (0:0,0:2,0:0)
- Sparta Praha – Dukla Trenčín 7:1 (0:0,2:1,5:0)

=== Placing round ===
- 5th–8th place
- Dukla Jihlava – TJ Gottwaldov/SK Zlín 6:2 (0:0,3:1,3:1)
- TJ Gottwaldov/SK Zlín – Dukla Jihlava 2:6 (1:4,0:1,1:1)
- VSŽ Košice – TJ Vítkovice 10:6 (5:1,2:4,3:1)
- TJ Vítkovice – VSŽ Košice 11:3 (4:1,4:0,3:2)
- VSŽ Košice – TJ Vítkovice 7:2 (2:0,3:2,2:0)
- 9th place
- Motor České Budějovice – Škoda Plzeň 6:3 (1:1,3:1,2:1)
- Motor České Budějovice – Škoda Plzeň 4:5 (1:2,2:1,1:2)
- Škoda Plzeň – Motor České Budějovice 3:4 (2:2,1:1,0:1)
- Škoda Plzeň – Motor České Budějovice 9:4 (2:2,1:0,6:2)
- Motor České Budějovice – Škoda Plzeň 6:4 (3:1,0:2,3:1)
- 7th place
- TJ Vítkovice – TJ Gottwaldov/SK Zlín 5:8 (1:2,1:5,3:1)
- TJ Gottwaldov/SK Zlín – TJ Vítkovice 5:9 (1:2,2:6,2:1)
- TJ Vítkovice – TJ Gottwaldov/SK Zlín 5:4 PP (1:2,0:1,3:1,1:0)
- 5th place
- Dukla Jihlava – VSŽ Košice 3:5 (0:2,1:3,2:0)
- VSŽ Košice – Dukla Jihlava 5:3 (1:0,2:3,2:0)
- 3rd place
- Poldi Kladno – CHZ Litvínov 1:3 (0:2,1:0,0:1)
- CHZ Litvínov – Poldi Kladno 5:4 (1:2,0:1,4:1)

== 1. Liga-Qualification ==
Pl.	Team	GP	Pts
1.	Tesla Pardubice	10	15
2.	Slovan CHZJD Bratislava	10	12
3.	DS Olomouc	10	11
4.	Plastika Nitra	10	10
5.	Zetor Brno	10	8
6.	Šumavan Vimperk	10	4
