= 1992–93 ice hockey Bundesliga season =

German ice hockey season

The 1992–93 Ice hockey Bundesliga season was the 35th season of the Bundesliga, the top level of ice hockey in Germany. 12 teams participated in the league, and Düsseldorfer EG won the championship.

== First round ==
	Club	GP	W	T	L	GF–GA	Pts
1.	Düsseldorfer EG (M)	44	31	8	5	190:108	70:18
2.	Kölner EC	44	23	10	11	152:117	56:32
3.	Krefelder EV	44	23	7	14	165:118	53:35
4.	EC Hedos München	44	21	8	15	143:111	50:38
5.	Mannheimer ERC	44	20	6	18	151:139	46:42
6.	BSC Preussen	44	17	11	16	136:141	45:43
7.	ESV Kaufbeuren	44	16	9	19	144:163	41:47
8.	EC Ratingen (N)	44	14	11	19	145:165	39:49
9.	Schwenninger ERC	44	15	8	21	138:155	38:50
10.	EV Landshut	44	14	8	22	126:160	36:52
11.	EHC Freiburg	44	12	8	24	140:164	32:56
12.	EHC Dynamo Berlin (N)	44	8	6	30	118:207	22:66

== Play-downs ==
=== First round ===
			Series	1	2	3	4	5	6	7
Schwenninger ERC	–	Eisbären Berlin	0:4	4:6	2:5	0:5	2:5	–	–	–
EV Landshut	–	EHC Freiburg	4:2	8:3	2:3 SO	8:1	1:5	5:2	4:3	–

=== Second round ===
			Series	1	2	3	4	5
Schwenninger ERC	–	EHC Freiburg	0:3	3:4	2:5	1:2	–	–

== Relegation ==
			Series	1	2	3
EHC Freiburg	–	ES Weißwasser	2:0	4:1	3:1	–

== Playoffs ==
=== Quarterfinals ===
			Series	1	2	3	4	5
Düsseldorfer EG	–	EC Ratingen	3:0	8:1	5:1	4:1	–	–
Kölner EC	–	ESV Kaufbeuren	3:0	8:2	3:1	3:1	–	–
Krefelder EV	–	BSC Preussen	1:3	3:4	2:4	3:2	3:4 OT	–
EC Hedos München	–	Mannheimer ERC	1:3	3:0	2:5	1:4	4:5	–

=== Semifinals ===
			Series	1	2	3	4	5
Düsseldorfer EG	–	BSC Preussen	3:0	3:2 OT	3:2 OT	2:1	–	–
Kölner EC	–	Mannheimer ERC	3:1	7:1	1:3	5:2	6:2	–

=== Final ===
			Series	1	2	3	4	5
Düsseldorfer EG	–	Kölner EC	3:2	5:4 OT	2:5	6:4	0:2	2:1 OT
