= 1977–78 Czechoslovak Extraliga season =

Czechoslovak ice hockey season

The 1977–78 Czechoslovak Extraliga season was the 35th season of the Czechoslovak Extraliga, the top level of ice hockey in Czechoslovakia. 12 teams participated in the league, and Poldi SONP Kladno won the championship.

== Regular season ==
Pl.	Team	GP	W	T	L	GF–GA	Pts
1.	Poldi SONP Kladno	44	28	7	9	182:117	63
2.	CHZ Litvínov	44	28	3	13	185:125	59
3.	Spartak ČKD Prag	44	25	8	11	144:111	58
4.	TJ Vítkovice	44	25	4	15	189:147	54
5.	Dukla Jihlava	44	22	9	13	150:116	53
6.	Motor České Budějovice	44	19	8	17	175:164	46
7.	Tesla Pardubice	44	14	11	19	127:131	39
8.	Slovan CHZJD Bratislava	44	16	6	22	151:159	38
9.	Zetor Brno	44	10	10	24	115:160	30
10.	VSŽ Košice	44	13	4	27	138:212	30
11.	Dukla Trenčín	44	14	1	29	111:164	29
12.	TJ Škoda Plzeň	44	11	7	26	125:186	29

== 1. Liga-Qualification ==
- TJ Gottwaldov – Lokomotíva Bučina Zvolen 4:2 (3:5, 2:1, 0:3, 4:3, 5:2, 4:0)
