= 1985–86 Czechoslovak Extraliga season =

Czechoslovak ice hockey season

The 1985–86 Czechoslovak Extraliga season was the 43rd season of the Czechoslovak Extraliga, the top level of ice hockey in Czechoslovakia. 12 teams participated in the league, and VSZ Kosice won the championship.

== Regular season ==
Pl.	Team	GP	W	T	L	GF–GA	Pts
1.	VSŽ Košice	34	23	2	9	159:109	48
2.	CHZ Litvínov	34	20	4	10	162:128	44
3.	Dukla Jihlava	34	16	8	10	116:84	40
4.	Tesla Pardubice	34	15	7	12	122:108	37
5.	Dukla Trenčín	34	14	8	12	121:123	36
6.	TJ Gottwaldov	34	15	5	14	123:102	35
7.	TJ Škoda Plzeň	34	16	3	15	125:128	35
8.	Sparta ČKD Prag	34	14	6	14	101:107	34
9.	Motor České Budějovice	34	15	3	16	117:116	33
10.	Poldi SONP Kladno	34	14	2	18	117:145	30
11.	Slovan CHZJD Bratislava	34	7	6	21	97:145	20
12.	Zetor Brno	34	6	4	24	76:141	16

== Playoffs ==
=== Quarterfinal ===
- VSŽ Košice – HC Sparta Praha 4:2 (0:1,0:1,4:0)
- VSŽ Košice – HC Sparta Praha 3:0 (1:0,1:0,1:0)
- HC Sparta Praha – VSŽ Košice 6:0 (1:0,0:0,5:0)
- HC Sparta Praha – VSŽ Košice 3:4 (2:1,0:2,1:1)
- CHZ Litvínov – Škoda Plzeň 7:6 (2:4,3:0,2:2)
- CHZ Litvínov – Škoda Plzeň 10:3 (2:1,4:1,4:1)
- Škoda Plzeň – CHZ Litvínov 5:7 (2:3,1:2,2:2)
- Dukla Jihlava – TJ Gottwaldov 9:4 (3:1,3:0,3:3)
- Dukla Jihlava – TJ Gottwaldov 4:1 (1:1,2:0,1:0)
- TJ Gottwaldov – Dukla Jihlava 2:4 (0:3,1:0,1:1)
- Tesla Pardubice – Dukla Trenčín 3:1 (0:1,1:0,2:0)
- Tesla Pardubice – Dukla Trenčín 4:1 (3:0,0:1,1:0)
- Dukla Trenčín – Tesla Pardubice 5:2 (1:1,3:1,1:0)
- Dukla Trenčín – Tesla Pardubice 5:4 PP (0:1,4:1,0:2,0:0,1:0)
- Tesla Pardubice – Dukla Trenčín 2:1 (1:0,0:0,1:1)

=== Semifinal ===
- VSŽ Košice – Tesla Pardubice 2:5 (1:0,1:3,0:2)
- VSŽ Košice – Tesla Pardubice 5:2 (1:0,0:1,4:1)
- Tesla Pardubice – VSŽ Košice 2:9 (0:3,0:2,2:4)
- Tesla Pardubice – VSŽ Košice 4:1 (3:1,0:0,1:0)
- VSŽ Košice – Tesla Pardubice 4:1 (3:0,0:0,1:1)
- CHZ Litvínov – Dukla Jihlava 2:4 (1:2,1:1,0:1)
- CHZ Litvínov – Dukla Jihlava 6:1 (2:0,2:1,2:0)
- Dukla Jihlava – CHZ Litvínov 5:4 SN (0:1,2:2,2:1,0:0,0:0,0:0)
- Dukla Jihlava – CHZ Litvínov 2:3 SN (1:1,1:1,0:0,0:0,0:0,0:0)
- CHZ Litvínov – Dukla Jihlava 3:4 PP (0:0,0:2,3:1,0:0,0:1)

=== Final ===
- VSŽ Košice – Dukla Jihlava 2:0 (2:0,0:0,0:0)
- VSŽ Košice – Dukla Jihlava 4:2 (1:0,2:0,1:2)
- Dukla Jihlava – VSŽ Košice 5:1 (2:0,1:0,2:1)
- Dukla Jihlava – VSŽ Košice 4:3 SN (1:1,0:1,2:1,0:0,0:0,0:0)
- VSŽ Košice – Dukla Jihlava 4:3 SN (2:2,1:1,0:0,0:0,0:0,0:0)

=== 7th place ===
- HC Sparta Praha – Škoda Plzeň 1:2 (0:0,0:2,1:0)
- Škoda Plzeň – HC Sparta Praha 6:5 (3:0,3:2,0:3)

=== 5th place ===
- TJ Gottwaldov – Dukla Trenčín 5:3 (2:2,0:1,3:0)
- Dukla Trenčín – TJ Gottwaldov 3:9 (2:0,0:6,1:3)

=== 3rd place ===
- Tesla Pardubice – CHZ Litvínov 6:7 (2:1,3:5,1:1)
- CHZ Litvínov – Tesla Pardubice 4:5 SN (2:3,1:1,1:0,0:0,0:0,0:0)
- CHZ Litvínov – Tesla Pardubice 3:4 (1:1,2:3,0:0)

== Relegation round ==
Pl.	Team	GP	Bonus	GF–GA	Pts
9.	Slovan CHZJD Bratislava	12	1	55:36	15
10.	Zetor Brno	12	0	42:38	14
11.	Motor České Budějovice	12	3	46:54	14
12.	Poldi SONP Kladno	12	2	35:50	11

== 1. Liga-Qualification ==
- TJ Vítovice – VTJ Michalovce 3:0 (4:0, 8:4, 6:2)
