= 1987–88 Czechoslovak Extraliga season =

Czechoslovak ice hockey season

The 1987–88 Czechoslovak Extraliga season was the 45th season of the Czechoslovak Extraliga, the top level of ice hockey in Czechoslovakia. 12 teams participated in the league, and VSZ Kosice won the championship.

== Regular season ==
Pl.	Team	GP	W	T	L	GF–GA	Pts
1.	Motor České Budějovice	34	20	5	9	124:85	45
2.	VSŽ Košice	34	19	7	8	138:106	45
3.	Sparta ČKD Prag	34	19	6	9	139:102	41
4.	Dukla Jihlava	34	17	7	10	132:113	41
5.	CHZ Litvínov	34	18	3	13	137:149	39
6.	Tesla Pardubice	34	15	7	12	131:113	37
7.	Dukla Trenčín	34	14	5	15	128:120	33
8.	Poldi SONP Kladno	34	11	8	15	125:136	30
9.	TJ Škoda Plzeň	34	12	4	18	120:141	28
10.	TJ Gottwaldov	34	9	7	18	116:135	25
11.	Slovan CHZJD Bratislava	34	7	7	20	87:134	21
12.	Zetor Brno	34	6	8	20	86:129	20

== Playoffs ==
=== Quarterfinal ===
- Motor České Budějovice – Poldi SONP Kladno 5:6 (0:1,2:2,3:3)
- Motor České Budějovice – Poldi SONP Kladno 8:6 (3:1,3:3,2:2)
- Poldi SONP Kladno – Motor České Budějovice 2:1 (1:0,1:1,0:0)
- Poldi SONP Kladno – Motor České Budějovice 7:2 (4:0,3:1,0:1)
- VSŽ Košice – Dukla Trenčín 4:3 PP (1:1,0:1,2:1,1:0)
- VSŽ Košice – Dukla Trenčín 5:2 (1:2,3:0,1:0)
- Dukla Trenčín – VSŽ Košice 5:2 (1:1,1:0,3:1)
- Dukla Trenčín – VSŽ Košice 2:5 (1:0,1:3,0:2)
- Sparta Praha – Tesla Pardubice 3:2 SN (1:0,1:2,0:0,0:0,0:0,0:0)
- Sparta Praha – Tesla Pardubice 2:5 (1:2,0:1,1:2)
- Tesla Pardubice – Sparta Praha 2:4 (1:2,0:1,1:1)
- Tesla Pardubice – Sparta Praha 4:5 (1:1,1:2,2:2)
- Dukla Jihlava – CHZ Litvínov 4:3 PP (0:0,1:1,2:2,1:0)
- Dukla Jihlava – CHZ Litvínov 5:3 (3:0,0:2,2:1)
- CHZ Litvínov – Dukla Jihlava 4:6 (2:0,1:2,1:4)

=== Semifinal ===
- VSŽ Košice – Poldi SONP Kladno 8:3 (1:1,4:2,3:0)
- VSŽ Košice – Poldi SONP Kladno 2:3 (1:0,1:0,0:3)
- Poldi SONP Kladno – VSŽ Košice 2:4 (0:0,1:2,1:2)
- Poldi SONP Kladno – VSŽ Košice 3:6 (2:1,1:2,0:3)
- Sparta Praha – Dukla Jihlava 4:0 (3:0,1:0,0:0)
- Sparta Praha – Dukla Jihlava 1:7 (0:1,0:4,1:2)
- Dukla Jihlava – Sparta Praha 1:2 PP (0:0,1:1,0:0,0:1)
- Dukla Jihlava – Sparta Praha 3:1 (1:0,1:0,1:1)
- Sparta Praha – Dukla Jihlava 5:1 (0:1,3:0,2:0)

=== Final ===
- VSŽ Košice – Sparta Praha 0:2 (0:0,0:0,0:2)
- VSŽ Košice – Sparta Praha 4:0 (0:0,2:0,2:0)
- Sparta Praha – VSŽ Košice 3:6 (0:2,2:1,1:3)
- Sparta Praha – VSŽ Košice 5:6 PP (2:2,1:2,2:1,0:0,0:1)

=== Placing round ===
- Motor České Budějovice – Dukla Trenčín 5:4 (3:1,0:0,2:3)
- Motor České Budějovice – Dukla Trenčín 7:2 (2:1,4:0,1:1)
- Dukla Trenčín – Motor České Budějovice 1:7 (0:1,1:2,0:4)
- CHZ Litvínov – Tesla Pardubice 0:7 (0:3,0:1,0:3)
- CHZ Litvínov – Tesla Pardubice 2:8 (0:5,0:2,2:1)
- Tesla Pardubice – CHZ Litvínov 9:4 (2:1,4:0,3:3)
- 7th place
- CHZ Litvínov – Dukla Trenčín 3:6 (0:1,1:3,2:2)
- CHZ Litvínov – Dukla Trenčín 5:7 (2:1,2:3,1:3)
- Dukla Trenčín – CHZ Litvínov 7:2 (2:0,1:0,4:2)
- 5th place
- Motor České Budějovice – Tesla Pardubice 9:1 (5:0,2:1,2:0)
- Motor České Budějovice – Tesla Pardubice 7:5 (0:3,2:1,5:1)
- Tesla Pardubice – Motor České Budějovice 2:6 (1:0,0:3,1:3)
- 3rd place
- Dukla Jihlava – Poldi SONP Kladno 4:6 (2:4,1:1,1:1)
- Dukla Jihlava – Poldi SONP Kladno 7:4 (2:0,3:1,2:3)
- Poldi SONP Kladno – Dukla Jihlava 5:7 (1:3,2:3,2:1)
- Poldi SONP Kladno – Dukla Jihlava 8:7 (2:2,5:3,1:2)
- Dukla Jihlava – Poldi SONP Kladno 13:1 (4:0,2:0,7:1)

== Relegation round ==
Pl.	Team	GP	Bonus	GF–GA	Pts
9.	TJ Gottwaldov	12	2	46:39	16
10.	TJ Škoda Plzeň	12	3	40:46	15
11.	Slovan CHZJD Bratislava	12	1	45:42	13
12.	Zetor Brno	12	0	36:40	10

== 1. Liga-Qualification ==
- TJ Vítkovice – Plastika Nitra 3:0 (2:1, 4:2, 6:3)
