= 1986–87 Czechoslovak Extraliga season =

44th season of the Czechoslovak Extraliga

The 1986–87 Czechoslovak Extraliga season was the 44th season of the Czechoslovak Extraliga, the top level of ice hockey in Czechoslovakia. 12 teams participated in the league, and Tesla Pardubice won the championship.

== Regular season ==
Pl.	Team	GP	W	T	L	GF–GA	Pts
1.	Tesla Pardubice	34	22	2	10	142:87	46
2.	Sparta ČKD Prag	34	17	7	10	115:95	41
3.	Dukla Jihlava	34	17	5	12	132:99	39
4.	VSŽ Košice	34	15	7	12	117:107	37
5.	Zetor Brno	34	15	6	13	94:107	36
6.	Motor České Budějovice	34	13	9	12	98:90	35
7.	Slovan CHZJD Bratislava	34	17	1	16	126:140	35
8.	TJ Gottwaldov	34	14	5	15	114:107	33
9.	CHZ Litvínov	34	12	5	17	129:135	29
10.	TJ Škoda Plzeň	34	11	6	17	109:129	28
11.	Dukla Trenčín	34	8	10	16	91:124	26
12.	TJ Vítovice	34	9	5	20	104:152	23

== Playoffs ==
Quarterfinal

- Pardubice – Gottwaldov 2:0 (6:2,4:2)
- Sparta Prag – Bratislava 2:0 (7:1,3:2)
- Jihlava – České Budějovice 2:0 (9:3,1:0)
- Košice – Brno 2:1 (8:1,2:3 PP,4:0)

Semifinal

- Pardubice – Košice 2:0 (7:1,6:4)
- Sparta Prag – Jihlava 0:2 (3:4,2:4)

Final

- Tesla Pardubice – Jihlava 3:2 (6:1,1:6,1:0,2:3,3:2 OT)

Placing round – 5th–8th place

- Brno – Gottwaldov 0:2 (3:7,3:4)
- České Budějovice – Bratislava 1:2 (4:5,5:4,2:3)

7th place

- Brno – České Budějovice 2:1 (3:1,3:7,6:3)

5th place

- Bratislava – Gottwaldov 2:1 (4:1,3:9,7:4)

3rd place

- Sparta Prag- Košice 2:0 (4:2,5:1)

== Relegation round ==
Pl.	Team	GP	Bonus	GF–GA	Pts
9.	CHZ Litvínov	12	3	57:56	16
10.	Dukla Trenčín	12	1	42:37	14
11.	TJ Škoda Plzeň	12	2	50:53	13
12.	TJ Vítovice	12	0	49:52	11

== 1. Liga-Qualification ==
- Poldi SONP Kladno – Plastika Nitra 3:0 (5:3, 4:1, 8:3)
