= 1980–81 Czechoslovak Extraliga season =

Czechoslovak ice hockey season

The 1980–81 Czechoslovak Extraliga season was the 38th season of the Czechoslovak Extraliga, the top level of ice hockey in Czechoslovakia. 12 teams participated in the league, and TJ Vitkovice won the championship.

== Regular season ==
Pl.	Team	GP	W	OTW	OTL	L	GF–GA	Pts
1.	TJ Vítkovice	44	27	7	1	9	211:148	68
2.	Motor České Budějovice	44	30	3	1	10	193:119	66
3.	Poldi SONP Kladno	44	25	4	1	14	164:124	58
4.	Dukla Jihlava	44	23	3	3	15	177:131	52
5.	CHZ Litvínov	44	19	6	1	18	170:173	50
6.	Dukla Trenčín	44	18	2	1	23	158:181	40
7.	Tesla Pardubice	44	17	2	3	22	169:190	38
8.	Spartak ČKD Prag	44	16	2	3	23	155:178	36
9.	VSŽ Košice	44	17	0	4	23	176:199	34
10.	TJ Gottwaldov	44	15	0	1	28	125:161	30
11.	TJ Škoda Plzeň	44	12	2	3	27	121:172	28
12.	Slovan CHZJD Bratislava	44	14	0	9	21	155:198	28

== 1. Liga-Qualification ==
- Zetor Brno – PS Poprad 3:2 (3:1, 2:3, 3:4, 5:2, 4:3)
