= 1982–83 Czechoslovak Extraliga season =

Czechoslovak ice hockey season

The 1982–83 Czechoslovak Extraliga season was the 40th season of the Czechoslovak Extraliga, the top level of ice hockey in Czechoslovakia. 12 teams participated in the league, and Dukla Jihlava won the championship.

== Regular season ==
Pl.	Team	GP	W	T	L	GF–GA	Pts
1.	Dukla Jihlava	44	28	6	10	176:100	62
2.	TJ Vítkovice	44	24	6	14	191:177	54
3.	Tesla Pardubice	44	24	5	15	180:134	53
4.	Motor České Budějovice	44	22	3	19	163:147	48
5.	VSŽ Košice	44	22	3	19	192:183	47
6.	CHZ Litvínov	44	17	9	18	188:174	43
7.	TJ Gottwaldov	44	17	6	21	175:172	40
8.	Spartak ČKD Prag	44	15	10	19	145:155	40
9.	TJ Škoda Plzeň	44	13	12	19	135:181	38
10.	Slovan CHZJD Bratislava	44	16	5	23	141:175	37
11.	Zetor Brno	44	12	10	22	144:192	34
12.	Poldi SONP Kladno	44	12	8	24	140:180	32

== 1. Liga-Qualification ==
- DS Olomouc – Dukla Trenčín 0:3 (5:10, 2:5, 1:8)
