= 1984–85 Czechoslovak Extraliga season =

Czechoslovak ice hockey season

The 1984–85 Czechoslovak Extraliga season was the 42nd season of the Czechoslovak Extraliga, the top level of ice hockey in Czechoslovakia. A mid-season break in the league occurred after 23 games; after 4 December 1984, the next games took place on 4 January 1985. 12 teams participated in the league, and Dukla Jihlava won the championship.

== Regular season ==
Pl.	Team	GP	W	T	L	GF–GA	Pts
1.	Dukla Jihlava	44	33	4	7	247:119	70
2.	VSŽ Košice	44	25	5	14	212:149	55
3.	TJ Gottwaldov	44	22	8	14	128:103	52
4.	Tesla Pardubice	44	22	5	17	159:154	49
5.	Motor České Budějovice	44	20	7	17	130:141	47
6.	Sparta ČKD Prag	44	18	6	20	146:153	42
7.	CHZ Litvínov	44	17	6	21	193:195	40
8.	Dukla Trenčín	44	18	4	22	141:157	40
9.	Zetor Brno	44	14	6	24	114:151	34
10.	Slovan CHZJD Bratislava	44	15	3	26	115:185	33
11.	TJ Škoda Plzeň	44	13	7	24	136:160	33
12.	TJ Vítkovice	44	15	3	26	135:189	33

== 1. Liga-Qualification ==
Place	Team	GP	W	T	L	GF–GA	Pts
1.	Poldi SONP Kladno	4	4	0	0	29:9	8
2.	TJ Vítkovice	4	1	0	3	16:23	2
3.	PS Poprad	4	1	0	3	14:27	2
