= 1981–82 Czechoslovak Extraliga season =

Czechoslovak ice hockey season

The 1981–82 Czechoslovak Extraliga season was the 39th season of the Czechoslovak Extraliga, the top level of ice hockey in Czechoslovakia. 12 teams participated in the league, and Dukla Jihlava won the championship.

== Regular season ==
Pl.	Team	GP	W	OTW	OTL	L	GF–GA	Pts
1.	Dukla Jihlava	44	35	2	3	4	179:89	74
2.	Poldi SONP Kladno	44	27	4	5	8	174:134	62
3.	CHZ Litvínov	44	23	2	3	16	205:167	50
4.	TJ Vítkovice	44	18	6	4	16	179:151	48
5.	Tesla Pardubice	44	17	3	1	23	183:169	40
6.	Motor České Budějovice	44	18	2	5	19	145:145	40
7.	Spartak ČKD Prag	44	15	5	3	21	129:151	40
8.	VSŽ Košice	44	16	4	2	22	150:197	40
9.	TJ Gottwaldov	44	13	4	5	22	119:135	34
10.	Zetor Brno	44	13	4	1	26	123:174	34
11.	TJ Škoda Plzeň	44	14	3	3	24	128:181	34
12.	Dukla Trenčín	44	15	1	5	23	133:154	32

== 1. Liga-Qualification ==
- Meochema Přerov – Slovan CHZJD Bratislava 0:3 (4:7, 1:10, 1:7)
