= 1983–84 Czechoslovak Extraliga season =

Czechoslovak ice hockey season

The 1983–84 Czechoslovak Extraliga season was the 41st season of the Czechoslovak Extraliga, the top level of ice hockey in Czechoslovakia. After 26 rounds of matches had been played, on 9 December 1983, the league went on a mid-season break until 24 February 1984. 12 teams participated in the league, and Dukla Jihlava won the championship.

== Regular season ==
Pl.	Team	GP	W	T	L	GF–GA	Pts
1.	Dukla Jihlava	44	29	7	8	196:109	65
2.	CHZ Litvínov	44	28	5	11	200:151	61
3.	Tesla Pardubice	44	22	8	14	150:133	52
4.	Sparta ČKD Prag	44	19	11	14	141:146	49
5.	Motor České Budějovice	44	19	7	18	144:141	45
6.	Dukla Trenčín	44	19	6	19	153:143	44
7.	VSŽ Košice	44	19	4	21	176:174	42
8.	Zetor Brno	44	15	8	21	129:144	38
9.	Slovan CHZJD Bratislava	44	14	7	23	147:176	35
10.	TJ Vítkovice	44	14	6	24	143:201	34
11.	TJ Gottwaldov	44	14	4	26	130:156	32
12.	TJ Škoda Plzeň	44	13	5	26	136:171	32

== 1. Liga-Qualification ==
Pl.	Team	GP	W	T	L	GF–GA	Pts
1.	TJ Škoda Plzeň	4	3	0	1	14:14	6
2.	Poldi SONP Kladno	4	1	2	1	14:11	4
3.	Plastika Nitra	4	0	2	2	8:11	2
