= Jiří Bubla =

Czech ice hockey player

Jiri Bubla
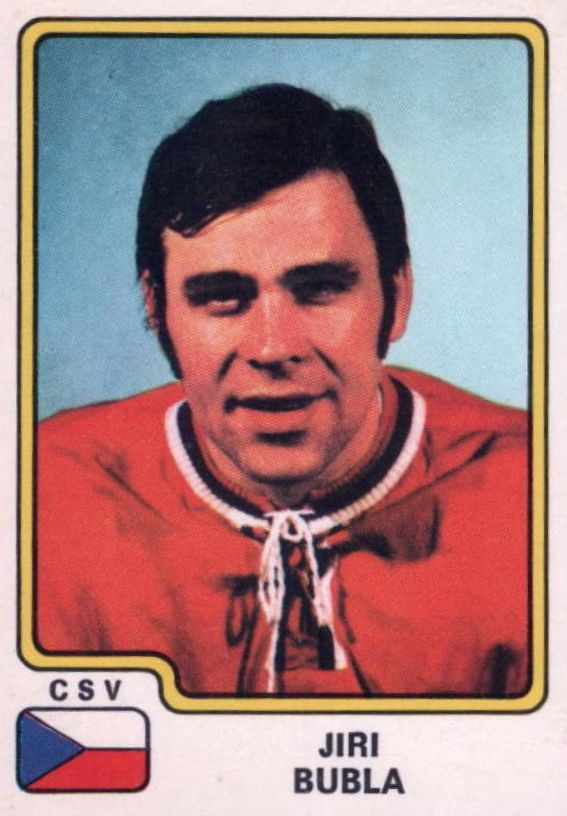
- Bubla in 1979
- Born: January 27, 1950 (age 76) Ústí nad Labem, Czechoslovakia
- Height: 5 ft 11 in (180 cm)
- Weight: 200 lb (91 kg; 14 st 4 lb)
- Position: Defence
- Shot: Right
- Played for: Vancouver Canucks
- National team: Czechoslovakia
- NHL draft: Undrafted
- Playing career: 1981–1986
Medal record
Men's ice hockey
Representing Czechoslovakia
Olympic Games
Silver medal – second place	1976 Innsbruck	Team
World Championships
Gold medal – first place	1972 Czechoslovakia	Team
Gold medal – first place	1976 Poland	Team
Gold medal – first place	1977 Austria	Team
Silver medal – second place	1971 Switzerland	Team
Silver medal – second place	1974 Finland	Team
Silver medal – second place	1975 West Germany	Team
Silver medal – second place	1978 Czechoslovakia	Team
Silver medal – second place	1979 USSR	Team
Bronze medal – third place	1973 USSR	Team

Jiří Bubla (born January 27, 1950) is a Czech former professional ice hockey defenceman.

Bubla played his entire National Hockey League career with the Vancouver Canucks, beginning in 1982. He retired after the 1985–86 season. He is the father of Jiří Šlégr, who is also an ice hockey player.

He competed for Czechoslovakia at the 1976 Winter Olympics, where the teams won the silver medal, and at the 1980 Winter Olympics.

Following his retirement from ice hockey, he was arrested at the 1987 IIHF World Championship in Vienna and charged with involvement in a drug trafficking ring. Convicted of smuggling four kilograms of heroin out of Pakistan into Canada via Austria, he served five years in prison in Austria.

== Career statistics ==
=== Regular season and playoffs ===
			Regular season					Playoffs
Season	Team	League	GP	G	A	Pts	PIM	GP	G	A	Pts	PIM
1967–68	TJ CHZ Litvínov	TCH	3	0	0	0	0	—	—	—	—	—
1968–69	TJ CHZ Litvínov	TCH	36	4	5	9	—	—	—	—	—	—
1969–70	ASD Dukla Jihlava	TCH	—	—	—	—	—	—	—	—	—	—
1970–71	ASD Dukla Jihlava	TCH	36	3	9	12	—	8	1	3	4	—
1971–72	TJ CHZ Litvínov	TCH	36	5	9	14	—	—	—	—	—	—
1972–73	TJ CHZ Litvínov	TCH	36	3	9	12	—	—	—	—	—	—
1973–74	TJ CHZ Litvínov	TCH	40	9	8	17	—	—	—	—	—	—
1974–75	TJ CHZ Litvínov	TCH	30	5	20	25	—	—	—	—	—	—
1975–76	TJ CHZ Litvínov	TCH	31	11	18	29	—	—	—	—	—	—
1976–77	TJ CHZ Litvínov	TCH	40	9	28	37	—	—	—	—	—	—
1977–78	TJ CHZ Litvínov	TCH	44	21	35	56	49	—	—	—	—	—
1978–79	TJ CHZ Litvínov	TCH	44	12	25	37	30	—	—	—	—	—
1979–80	TJ CHZ Litvínov	TCH	17	5	11	16	8	—	—	—	—	—
1979–80	TJ Sparta ČKD Praha	TCH	14	1	6	7	10	—	—	—	—	—
1980–81	TJ Sparta ČKD Praha	TCH	40	4	16	20	14	—	—	—	—	—
1981–82	Vancouver Canucks	NHL	23	1	1	2	16	—	—	—	—	—
1982–83	Vancouver Canucks	NHL	77	2	28	30	59	1	0	0	0	5
1983–84	Vancouver Canucks	NHL	62	6	33	39	43	2	0	0	0	0
1984–85	Vancouver Canucks	NHL	56	2	15	17	54	—	—	—	—	—
1985–86	Vancouver Canucks	NHL	43	6	24	30	30	3	0	0	0	2
TCH totals			447	92	199	291	—	8	1	3	4	—
NHL totals			256	17	101	118	202	6	0	0	0	7

=== International ===
Year	Team	Event	GP	G	A	Pts	PIM
1971	Czechoslovakia	WC	9	1	0	1	2
1972	Czechoslovakia	WC	10	0	1	1	8
1973	Czechoslovakia	WC	10	1	2	3	6
1974	Czechoslovakia	WC	10	1	3	4	2
1975	Czechoslovakia	WC	10	1	2	3	6
1976	Czechoslovakia	OLY	5	1	3	4	6
1976	Czechoslovakia	WC	10	4	3	7	2
1976	Czechoslovakia	CC	7	3	2	5	4
1977	Czechoslovakia	WC	10	0	4	4	6
1978	Czechoslovakia	WC	9	1	2	3	8
1979	Czechoslovakia	WC	8	2	2	4	8
1980	Czechoslovakia	OLY	6	0	3	3	2
Senior totals			104	15	27	42	60
