= Milan Nový =

Czech ice hockey player

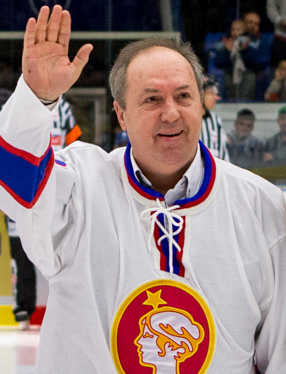
- Nový in 2014
- Born: 23 September 1951 (age 75) Kladno, Czechoslovakia
- Height: 5 ft 10 in (178 cm)
- Weight: 196 lb (89 kg; 14 st 0 lb)
- Position: Centre
- Shot: Left
- Played for: HC Kladno; HC Jihlava; Washington Capitals; Zurcher SC; Wiener EV
- National team: Czechoslovakia
- NHL draft: 58th overall, 1982; Washington Capitals
- Playing career: 1975–1989
Medal record
Men's ice hockey
Representing Czechoslovakia
Olympic Games
Silver medal – second place	1976 Innsbruck	Team
World Championships
Gold medal – first place	1976 Poland	Team
Gold medal – first place	1977 Austria	Team
Silver medal – second place	1975 West Germany	Team
Silver medal – second place	1978 Czechoslovakia	Team
Silver medal – second place	1979 Soviet Union	Team
Silver medal – second place	1982 Finland	Team
Bronze medal – third place	1981 Sweden	Team
Canada Cup
Silver medal – second place	1976 Canada Cup	Team
Bronze medal – third place	1981 Canada Cup	Team

Milan Nový (born 23 September 1951) is a Czech former professional ice hockey center. He played 16 seasons in the Czechoslovak Elite League, winning six league championships between 1974 and 1980. He also played one season in the National Hockey League with the Washington Capitals during the 1982–83 season. Internationally Nový played for the Czechoslovakia national team on multiple occasions, including the 1976 and 1980 Winter Olympics, winning a silver medal in 1976, and gold at the 1976 and 1977 World Championships. Nový was inducted into the IIHF Hall of Fame in 2012.

== Playing career ==
Nový played for Kladno in the Czechoslovak junior league from 1963 to 1968. He played in the elite league with Kladno from 1968 to 1972, Jihlava from 1972 to 1974, and Kladno again from 1974 to 1982 and 1987 to 1989. He was named the top player in the league three times, and was first in scoring six times. His 90 points (59 goals and 31 assists) in 44 games in 1976–77 is the league record. Nový scored 474 goals in 633 league games, as well as 120 goals in 211 games with the national team. He holds the Czech "iron man" record, playing eight seasons without missing a game.

Nový won a silver medal with the Czechoslovak national team at the 1976 Winter Olympics and played in the 1980 Olympics, leading all scorers with 15 points. He appeared in seven consecutive IIHF World Championships from 1975 to 1982, and was named to the all-star team in 1976. He led all players in Moscow's Izvestia Cup with 14 goals in 1974.

Nový was named to the 1976 Canada Cup all-star team, tied for the most goals, and was the top scorer and MVP on his team. He scored the only goal in a 1–0 Czechoslovak victory over Canada, in a game Bobby Orr said was the best he ever played in. He also played in the 1981 Canada Cup.

He played with the Washington Capitals in 1982–83. Though he began with a goal and two assists in his first game and points in his first four games, he had difficulty adjusting to North American culture and the physical play of the North American game, finishing the season with 48 points in 73 games. He played with Zurcher SC in Switzerland from 1983 to 1985 and with EV Wien in Austria in 1985–86. Nový returned to Kladno in 1986, to help his old team get out of the second division, back into the elite league. They succeeded, and he played in the elite league for two more years before retiring in 1989.

Nový was inducted into the IIHF Hall of Fame in 2012.

== Czechoslovak Elite League awards ==
- Golden Hockey Stick (Top player): 1977, 1981, 1982
- Scoring title: 1973, 1976, 1977, 1978, 1981, 1982
- Top goal scorer: 1973, 1975, 1976, 1977
- On championship team: 1974 (Jihlava); 1975, 1976, 1977, 1978, 1980 (Kladno)

== Career statistics ==
=== Regular season and playoffs ===
			Regular season					Playoffs
Season	Team	League	GP	G	A	Pts	PIM	GP	G	A	Pts	PIM
1968–69	TJ SONP Kladno	CSSR	7	2	3	5	4	—	—	—	—	—
1969–70	TJ SONP Kladno	CSSR	34	14	8	22	16	—	—	—	—	—
1970–71	TJ SONP Kladno	CSSR	36	16	16	32	16	9	3	7	10	2
1971–72	TJ SONP Kladno	CSSR	36	12	10	22	14	—	—	—	—	—
1972–73	ASD Dukla Jihlava	CSSR	35	30	14	44	18	10	9	3	12	—
1973–74	ASD Dukla Jihlava	CSSR	42	35	29	54	18	—	—	—	—	—
1974–75	TJ SONP Kladno	CSSR	40	45	22	67	38	—	—	—	—	—
1975–76	TJ SONP Kladno	CSSR	32	32	25	57	14	—	—	—	—	—
1976–77	TJ SONP Kladno	CSSR	44	59	34	93	22	—	—	—	—	—
1977–78	Poldi SONP Kladno	CSSR	44	40	35	75	64	—	—	—	—	—
1978–79	Poldi SONP Kladno	CSSR	43	33	24	57	4	22	9	8	17	—
1979–80	Poldi SONP Kladno	CSSR	44	36	30	66	20	—	—	—	—	—
1980–81	Poldi SONP Kladno	CSSR	44	32	39	71	12	28	13	6	19	—
1981–82	Poldi SONP Kladno	CSSR	44	29	26	55	38	—	—	—	—	—
1982–83	Washington Capitals	NHL	73	18	30	48	16	2	0	0	0	0
1983–84	ZSC Lions	NDA	38	31	23	54	—	—	—	—	—	—
1984–85	ZSC Lions	NLB	40	40	44	84	—	—	—	—	—	—
1985–86	Wiener EV	AUT	40	31	50	81	16	—	—	—	—	—
1986–87	Poldi SONP Kladno	CZE.2	34	24	29	53	18	6	9	9	18	0
1987–88	Poldi SONP Kladno	CSSR	34	13	23	36	6	13	11	6	17	4
1988–89	Poldi SONP Kladno	CSSR	34	14	17	31	2	—	—	—	—	—
NHL totals			73	18	30	48	16	2	0	0	0	0
CSSR totals			597	442	345	787	306	82	49	26	75	—

=== International ===
Year	Team	Event	GP	G	A	Pts	PIM
1975	Czechoslovakia	WC	10	4	4	8	4
1976	Czechoslovakia	OLY	5	5	0	5	0
1976	Czechoslovakia	WC	10	9	6	15	4
1976	Czechoslovakia	CC	7	5	3	8	2
1977	Czechoslovakia	WC	10	7	9	16	2
1978	Czechoslovakia	WC	9	4	1	5	2
1979	Czechoslovakia	WC	5	0	2	2	4
1980	Czechoslovakia	OLY	6	7	8	15	0
1981	Czechoslovakia	WC	8	6	2	8	2
1981	Czechoslovakia	CC	6	1	2	3	7
1982	Czechoslovakia	WC	10	3	1	4	6
Senior totals			86	51	38	89	33

Awards
Preceded by Peter Šťastný	Golden Hockey Stick; 1981, 1982	Succeeded by Vincent Lukac
Preceded by Vladimír Martinec	Golden Hockey Stick; 1977	Succeeded by Ivan Hlinka
