= Václav Nedomanský =

Czech ice hockey forward (born 1944)

- Hockey Hall of Fame, 2019
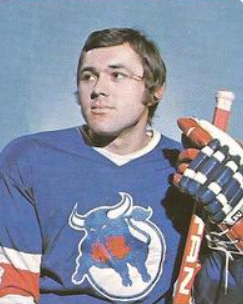
- Nedomanský with the Toronto Toros in 1975
- Born: 14 March 1944 (age 82) Hodonín, Bohemia and Moravia
- Height: 6 ft 1 in (185 cm)
- Weight: 210 lb (95 kg; 15 st 0 lb)
- Position: Centre
- Shot: Left
- Played for: Slovan Bratislava; Toronto Toros; Birmingham Bulls; Detroit Red Wings; New York Rangers; St. Louis Blues
- National team: Czechoslovakia
- Playing career: 1962–1983
Medal record
Men's ice hockey
Representing Czechoslovakia
Men's ice hockey
Olympic Games
Silver medal – second place	1968 Grenoble	Team
Bronze medal – third place	1972 Sapporo	Team
World Championships
Silver medal – second place	1965 Finland	Ice hockey
Silver medal – second place	1966 Yugoslavia	Ice hockey
Bronze medal – third place	1969 Sweden	Ice hockey
Bronze medal – third place	1970 Sweden	Ice hockey
Silver medal – second place	1971 Switzerland	Ice hockey
Gold medal – first place	1972 Czechoslovakia	Ice hockey
Bronze medal – third place	1973 Soviet Union	Ice hockey
Silver medal – second place	1974 Finland	Ice hockey

Václav Nedomanský (born 14 March 1944) is a Czech former ice hockey forward. He played a total of 22 seasons in three major professional leagues in the Czechoslovak First Ice Hockey League, World Hockey Association (WHA), and the National Hockey League (NHL). He played for Slovan Bratislava, Toronto Toros, Birmingham Bulls, Detroit Red Wings, New York Rangers, and the St. Louis Blues.

He played for the Slovan Bratislava in Czechoslovakia's major pro league in 1962 and recorded seven 30-goal seasons in 12 years and was considered a folklore hero. In 1974, Nedomanský was the first Czechoslovak hockey player to defect to North America for professional hockey, playing with the Toronto Toros of the World Hockey Association. In the 1975–76 WHA season, he scored 56 goals in 81 games and won the Paul Deneau Trophy for his gentlemanly conduct.

He departed the team early in the 1977–78 season to join the Detroit Red Wings of the NHL. He recorded consecutive 30-goal seasons from 1978 to 1980 before playing his final professional season in the 1982–83 season with the Rangers and Blues. He recorded over 300 goals in his native country and over 250 combined goals in the two North American leagues that he played in. Internationally, he played for the national team on eleven occasions, which saw them finish second and third in 1968 and 1972 for the Olympic Games while winning a Ice Hockey World Championship in 1972.

Nedomanský has been inducted into numerous Halls of Fame, starting with the International Ice Hockey Federation Hall of Fame in 1997 before being inducted into both the Slovak and Czech Hockey Halls of Fame in 2002 and 2008, respectively; he was inducted into the IIHF All-Time Czech Team in 2020. In 2019, he was inducted into the Hockey Hall of Fame, the second Czech player to receive the honor.

== Czechoslovakia playing career ==
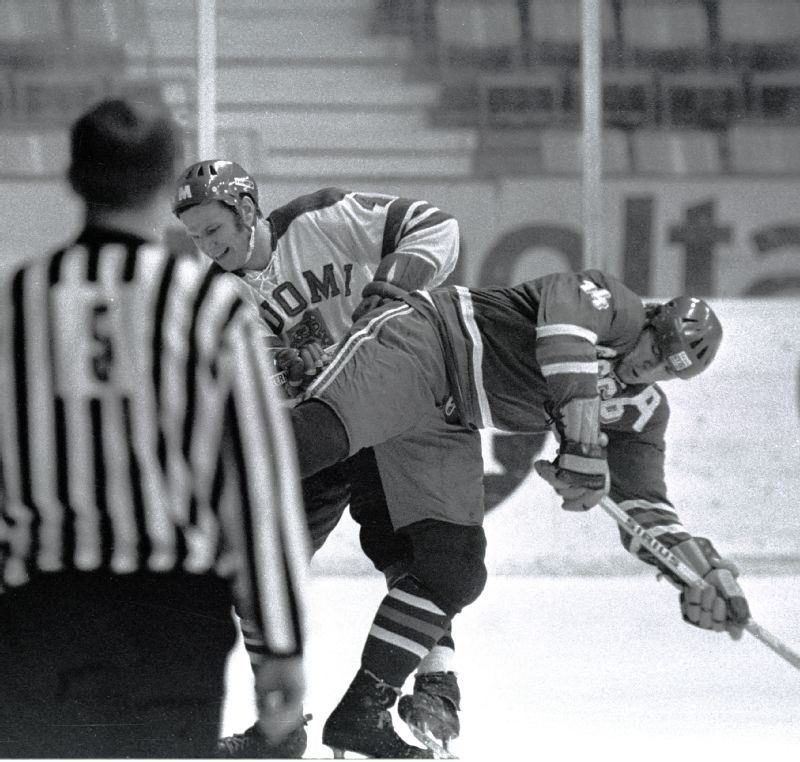
Nedomanský (right) with Czechoslovkia in 1970

Nedomanský was born in Hodonín in the Protectorate of Bohemia and Moravia in the present-day Czech Republic. He grew up in an apartment that his mother lived in for 60 years. In addition to playing hockey, he also played basketball, tennis, and football. Apparently, he also played briefly for Slovan Bratislava, once scoring a goal for the B team. He studied biology and the faculty of physical education for the country.

Nedomanský played for Slovan Bratislava of the Czechoslovak Extraliga for twelve seasons. In 1968, he was a member of the Czechoslovak national ice hockey team which won silver medals at the Winter Olympics in Grenoble and bronze medals in 1972 at the Winter Olympics in Sapporo. He also played for Czechoslovakia in nine IIHF World Championships and was named top forward at the 1974 World Championships. The 1972 team won the Ice Hockey World Championship over the Soviet Union for their first championship since 1949. At the time, any victory for the Czechoslovak Socialist Republic, a satellite state in Soviet sphere was considered a great one for the nation. So impactful was the victory by the Czech team over the Soviets that tennis legend Martina Navratilova cited it as one of her catalysts for her defection in 1975.

== Career after defection ==
Nedomanský wished to play in North America and defect. Unfortunately, he could not defect to the NHL due to an agreement the league had made with the International Ice Hockey Federation that prevented European players from playing there. However, the World Hockey Association, looking to get the best possible players to not play for the NHL, managed to entice him to play for them, with John F. Bassett of the Toronto Toros helping Nedomanský and his family get to Canada by way of flight from Zurich, Switzerland in 1974. Government officials soon began to try and erase Nedomanský from the homeland's memory, which ranged from telling teammates that he died in a car accident to scrubbing his image from team photos. When he played in an exhibition game against the Soviet Wings years later, the Russian broadcast only referred to him by his number. He saw his father only once more in 1984, when he was granted a visa to travel to Canada, with the two Nedomanskýs spending two weeks together before his father died of a terminal illness. He was not able to return to his home country until 1991, shortly after the fall of the Iron Curtain, whereupon he visited his mother at her apartment.

Nedomanský played just over three seasons in the World Hockey Association with the Toronto Toros and the Birmingham Bulls, peaking with 56 goals and 98 points for Toronto while also being awarded the Paul Deneau Trophy for sportsmanship in the 1975–76 season. Despite wanting to be traded to Winnipeg or Quebec, Nedomanský stayed with the team when they relocated to Birmingham, Alabama. Early into his second season in Birmingham, a unique trade took place between the WHA and NHL. Looking for enforcers and salary cuts, the Bulls sent Nedomanský and Tim Sheehy to the Detroit Red Wings for Steve Durbano and Dave Hanson. Nedomanský played five seasons for Detroit, posting highs of 38 goals and 74 points.

In 1979, Nedomansky was looking to sign one final contract and the services of Alan Eagleson was meant to handle the matter for his benefit. Apparently, the contract negotiated for Nedomansky would be for several years and even garner a job for him after his playing career ended. However, news of the deal spread through NHL management that urged Detroit and Eagleson to cancel it because of the potential for players to ask for higher salaries. Nedomansky was subsequently offered a four-year contract without the job offer at the end (as hidden by Eagleson) and the right for the team to end the deal after two years. In 1984, he sued Eagleson but lost the case and had to pay court costs (years later, Eagleson would be convicted of fraud and embezzlement after abusing his power with the NHLPA for several years).

In his final season in the 1982–83 season, he played with the Blues and Rangers. He recorded 14 goals with 17 assists in 57 games.

After his playing career ended, Nedomanský coached in Germany and Austria for several years. He also served as a scout for the Los Angeles Kings, Nashville Predators, and Vegas Golden Knights.

== Legacy ==
Often called "Big Ned", Nedomanský served as the pioneer for Czech and Slovak players to idolize for his courage and play, such as Peter Šťastný, Patrik Elias, and Bobby Holik. The winter stadium in Hodonín bears the name of Nedomanský. He was inducted into the IIHF Hall of Fame in 1997.

Prior to being a noted scout, David Conte first heard about Nedomansky from a Czechoslovak defector when he was working at a winery as a youth as the one that "everyone wanted to wear" his number 14 jersey. Conte eventually met Nedomansky in the late 1980s and again in the 1990s when the two were scouts (Conte for the New Jersey Devils, Nedomansky for Los Angeles) and later worked together for the expansion team Vegas Golden Knights. Conte, with the help of analytics staffers, helped to make a pitch for Nedomansky being inducted into the Hockey Hall of Fame that compared him to other European greats that resulted in his eventual induction. Conte reflected on Nedomansky being inducted in 2019:

This is an honor that represents so much more than a statistical summary. His defection gave hope to players behind the iron curtain. The migration of great European players enriched our game so much and gave way to the growth of the game globally. His character gave us all an example of dignity and class. He has been an inspiration and example to the world of hockey. This recognition reflects that. Personally, I congratulate Vaclav. I feel richer for knowing him, and I know the Hall is richer for having him.

== Personal life ==
Nedomanský has been married twice and has had three children.

== Career statistics ==
=== Regular season and playoffs ===
			Regular season					Playoffs
Season	Team	League	GP	G	A	Pts	PIM	GP	G	A	Pts	PIM
1960–61	SHK Hodonín	CZE-2	—	—	—	—	—	—	—	—	—	—
1961–62	SHK Hodonín	CZE-2	—	—	—	—	—	—	—	—	—	—
1962–63	Slovan ChZJD Bratislava	CSSR	—	—	—	—	—	—	—	—	—	—
1963–64	Slovan ChZJD Bratislava	CSSR	31	20	7	27	—	—	—	—	—	—
1964–65	Slovan ChZJD Bratislava	CSSR	32	31	10	41	—	—	—	—	—	—
1965–66	Slovan ChZJD Bratislava	CSSR	36	39	14	53	—	—	—	—	—	—
1966–67	Slovan ChZJD Bratislava	CSSR	36	40	20	60	22	—	—	—	—	—
1967–68	Slovan ChZJD Bratislava	CSSR	36	34	15	49	10	8	5	6	11	—
1968–69	Slovan ChZJD Bratislava	CSSR	36	27	20	47	—	—	—	—	—	—
1969–70	Slovan ChZJD Bratislava	CSSR	36	29	13	42	23	—	—	—	—	—
1970–71	Slovan ChZJD Bratislava	CSSR	33	31	15	46	—	7	7	3	10	—
1971–72	Slovan ChZJD Bratislava	CSSR	35	35	21	56	—	—	—	—	—	—
1972–73	Slovan ChZJD Bratislava	CSSR	34	22	17	39	—	11	4	4	8	—
1973–74	Slovan ChZJD Bratislava	CSSR	44	46	28	74	—	—	—	—	—	—
1974–75	Toronto Toros	WHA	78	41	40	81	19	6	3	1	4	9
1975–76	Toronto Toros	WHA	81	56	42	98	8	—	—	—	—	—
1976–77	Birmingham Bulls	WHA	81	36	33	69	10	—	—	—	—	—
1977–78	Birmingham Bulls	WHA	12	2	3	5	6	—	—	—	—	—
1977–78	Detroit Red Wings	NHL	63	11	17	28	2	7	3	5	8	0
1978–79	Detroit Red Wings	NHL	80	38	35	73	19	—	—	—	—	—
1979–80	Detroit Red Wings	NHL	79	35	39	74	13	—	—	—	—	—
1980–81	Detroit Red Wings	NHL	74	12	20	32	30	—	—	—	—	—
1981–82	Detroit Red Wings	NHL	68	12	28	40	22	—	—	—	—	—
1982–83	New York Rangers	NHL	35	12	8	20	0	—	—	—	—	—
1982–83	St. Louis Blues	NHL	22	2	9	11	2	—	—	—	—	—
CSSR totals			388	354	180	534	—	26	16	13	29	—
WHA totals			252	135	118	253	43	6	3	1	4	9
NHL totals			421	122	156	278	88	7	3	5	8	0

=== International ===
Year	Team	Event	GP	G	A	Pts	PIM
1965	Czechoslovakia	WC	7	4	2	6	2
1966	Czechoslovakia	WC	7	5	2	7	8
1967	Czechoslovakia	WC	7	1	2	3	14
1968	Czechoslovakia	OLY	7	5	2	7	4
1969	Czechoslovakia	WC	10	9	2	11	10
1970	Czechoslovakia	WC	10	10	7	17	11
1971	Czechoslovakia	WC	10	10	7	17	—
1972	Czechoslovakia	OLY	6	8	3	11	0
1972	Czechoslovakia	WC	9	9	6	15	0
1973	Czechoslovakia	WC	10	9	3	12	2
1974	Czechoslovakia	WC	10	10	3	13	4
Senior totals			93	80	39	119	55
