= Marián Šťastný =

Slovak ice hockey player

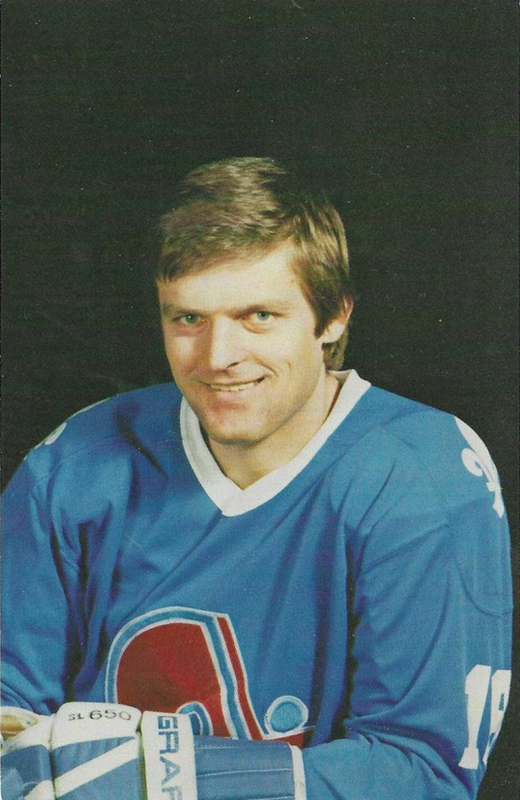
- Šťastný on 1981 postcard
- Born: 8 January 1953 (age 73) Bratislava, Czechoslovakia
- Height: 5 ft 10 in (178 cm)
- Weight: 194 lb (88 kg; 13 st 12 lb)
- Position: Right wing
- Shot: Left
- Played for: Slovan ChZJD Bratislava; HC Dukla Jihlava; Quebec Nordiques; Toronto Maple Leafs; HC Sierre
- National team: Czechoslovakia
- NHL draft: Undrafted
- Playing career: 1974–1987

Marián Šťastný (born 8 January 1953) is a Slovak former professional ice hockey right winger. He played for five seasons in the National Hockey League (NHL) from 1981 through 1986 for the Quebec Nordiques and Toronto Maple Leafs. Prior to moving to the NHL Šťastný had played in Czechoslovakia for Slovan ChZJD Bratislava with his brothers, Peter and Anton. They defected in 1980, joining the Nordiques, though Marián waited until 1981 to join them.

== Playing career ==
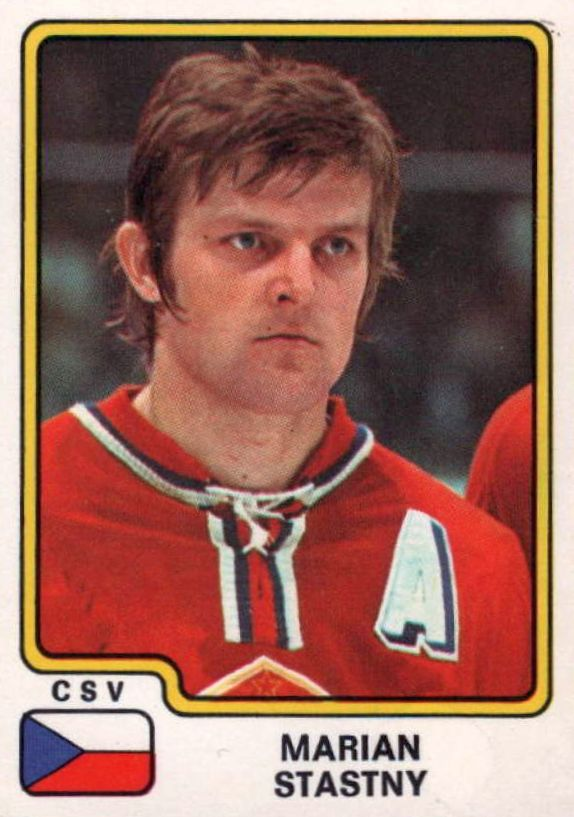
Šťastný in 1979 card

Šťastný played for Slovan ChZJD Bratislava of the Czechoslovak First Ice Hockey League from 1974 to 1981. During this time, he represented Czechoslovakia in five World Championships (winning two gold medals), two Winter Olympics, and the 1976 Canada Cup. He also competed in the men's tournament at the 1980 Winter Olympics.

In 1981, Šťastný joined his two younger brothers, Peter and Anton, as free agents with Quebec Nordiques, playing with them for four seasons. They were the third trio of brothers to play on the same professional hockey team (the first being the Bentley brothers of the Chicago Blackhawks in the 1940s and the second being the Plager brothers of the St. Louis Blues in the 1970s). He signed with the Toronto Maple Leafs before the beginning of the 1985–86 NHL season, playing one season in Toronto before ending his career in Switzerland with the HC Sierre.

== Political activity ==
Šťastný was elected vice-chairman of the Slovak World Congress in July 1987. To protest the Communist regime's violations of religious freedom and human rights, he organized protests in front of Czechoslovak embassies for the following 25 March. He communicated these plans to dissident leader Ján Čarnogurský in a hidden letter on a chocolate wrapper. These plans led to the Candle demonstration in Bratislava.

== Personal life ==
Šťastný was born in Bratislava, the third son of Stanislav and Františka. His two older brothers, Vladimír (born 1945) and Bohumil (born 1947) were born when the family still lived in the village of Pružina, about 170 kilometres northeast of Bratislava. They moved to Bratislava before Marián's birth, which was followed by Peter (1956), Anton (1959), and Eva (1966). Stanislav worked for a state-run company that built hydro-electric dams until 1980 when he retired, and mainly dealt with managing inventory. Františka stayed at home and raised the children. Vladimir was the former assistant coach of the Slovakia national ice hockey team. Marián's nephews Yan and Paul Stastny, both sons of Peter, have also played in the NHL.

Šťastný retired to the Quebec City area and after a brief attempt at coaching with the Junior Tier II CNDF hockey team, is now the owner of a golf club and a hotel in Saint-Nicolas, on the south shore of the Saint Lawrence River near Quebec City.

== Career statistics ==
=== Regular season and playoffs ===
			Regular season					Playoffs
Season	Team	League	GP	G	A	Pts	PIM	GP	G	A	Pts	PIM
1970–71	Slovan ChZJD Bratislava	CSSR	—	—	—	—	—	—	—	—	—	—
1971–72	Slovan ChZJD Bratislava	CSSR	—	17	11	28	—	—	—	—	—	—
1972–73	Slovan ChZJD Bratislava	CSSR	—	—	—	—	—	—	—	—	—	—
1973–74	Slovan ChZJD Bratislava	CSSR	—	14	7	21	—	—	—	—	—	—
1974–75	Slovan ChZJD Bratislava	CSSR	44	36	27	63	57	—	—	—	—	—
1975–76	Slovan ChZJD Bratislava	CSSR	31	17	11	28	53	—	—	—	—	—
1976–77	Slovan ChZJD Bratislava	CSSR	43	28	20	48	—	—	—	—	—	—
1977–78	Slovan ChZJD Bratislava	CSSR	44	33	23	56	58	—	—	—	—	—
1978–79	Slovan ChZJD Bratislava	CSSR	40	39	35	74	—	—	—	—	—	—
1979–80	HC Dukla Jihlava	CSSR	14	8	6	14	0	—	—	—	—	—
1979–80	Slovan ChZJD Bratislava	CSSR	21	20	15	35	22	—	—	—	—	—
1981–82	Quebec Nordiques	NHL	74	35	54	89	27	16	3	14	17	5
1982–83	Quebec Nordiques	NHL	60	36	43	79	32	2	0	0	0	0
1983–84	Quebec Nordiques	NHL	68	20	32	52	26	9	2	3	5	2
1984–85	Quebec Nordiques	NHL	50	7	14	21	4	2	0	0	0	0
1985–86	Toronto Maple Leafs	NHL	70	23	30	53	21	3	0	0	0	0
1986–87	HC Sierre	NDA	27	23	19	42	24	—	—	—	—	—
CSSR totals			237	181	137	318	212	—	—	—	—	—
NHL totals			322	121	173	294	110	32	5	17	22	7

- CSSR totals do not include numbers from the 1970–71 season to the 1973–74 season.

=== International ===
Year	Team	Event	GP	G	A	Pts	PIM
1971	Czechoslovakia	EJC	—	—	—	—	—
1972	Czechoslovakia	EJC	5	5	4	9	6
1975	Czechoslovakia	WC	5	3	1	4	0
1976	Czechoslovakia	WC	8	2	4	6	2
1976	Czechoslovakia	CC	7	1	4	5	2
1977	Czechoslovakia	WC	10	7	4	11	2
1978	Czechoslovakia	WC	9	4	5	9	4
1979	Czechoslovakia	WC	8	0	5	5	2
1980	Czechoslovakia	OLY	6	5	6	11	4
Senior totals			53	22	29	51	16

== See also ==
- Notable families in the NHL
- List of Slovaks in the NHL

== Bibliography ==
- Laflamme, Robert (2012), Les Stastny: Le Coup de Génie de Gilles Léger (in French), Montreal: Hurtubise, ISBN 978-2-89647-873-6
