= List of Slovaks in the NHL =

The following is a list of ice hockey players from Slovakia who played or are playing in the National Hockey League (NHL). It is sorted by all-time points scored.

Since the 1958–59 season, 93 Slovak forwards and defencemen have played at least one game in the NHL. Also, five goalies native to Slovakia have appeared in games.

At the top of this list, there is additionally the unranked Stan Mikita. Stan Mikita was born in Slovakia, but left at the age of eight. He learned to play hockey in Canada and represented Canada internationally, so his first place may be disputed by some sources. All other players started their pro-careers in Europe.

Active players currently playing in the NHL are in bold.

– Player has won a Stanley Cup.

== All-time scoring leaders ==
Rank	Name	Team(s)	Season(s)	GP	Goals	Assists	Points
–	Stan Mikita	Chicago Blackhawks	1958–1980	1394	541	926	1467
1	Peter Šťastný	Quebec Nordiques; New Jersey Devils; St. Louis Blues	1980–1995	977	450	789	1239
2	Marián Hossa	Ottawa Senators; Atlanta Thrashers; Pittsburgh Penguins; Detroit Red Wings; Chicago Blackhawks	1997–2017	1309	525	609	1134
3	Peter Bondra	Washington Capitals; Ottawa Senators; Atlanta Thrashers; Chicago Blackhawks	1990–2007	1081	503	389	892
4	Marián Gáborík	Minnesota Wild; New York Rangers; Columbus Blue Jackets; Los Angeles Kings; Ottawa Senators	2000–2018	1035	407	408	815
5	Pavol Demitra	Ottawa Senators; St. Louis Blues; Los Angeles Kings; Minnesota Wild; Vancouver Canucks	1993–2010	848	304	464	768
6	Miroslav Šatan	Edmonton Oilers; Buffalo Sabres; New York Islanders; Pittsburgh Penguins; Boston Bruins	1995–2010	1050	363	372	735
7	Žigmund Pálffy	New York Islanders; Los Angeles Kings; Pittsburgh Penguins	1993–2006	684	329	384	713
8	Zdeno Chára	New York Islanders; Ottawa Senators; Boston Bruins; Washington Capitals	1997–2022	1680	209	471	680
9	Jozef Stümpel	Boston Bruins; Los Angeles Kings; Florida Panthers	1991–2008	957	196	481	677
10	Anton Šťastný	Quebec Nordiques	1980–1989	650	252	384	636
11	Tomáš Tatar	Detroit Red Wings; Vegas Golden Knights; Montreal Canadiens; New Jersey Devils; Colorado Avalanche; Seattle Kraken	2010–2025	927	227	269	496
12	Ľubomír Višňovský	Los Angeles Kings; Edmonton Oilers; Anaheim Ducks; New York Islanders	2000–2015	883	128	367	495
13	Michal Handzuš	St. Louis Blues; Phoenix Coyotes; Philadelphia Flyers; Chicago Blackhawks; Los Angeles Kings; San Jose Sharks	1998–2014	1010	185	298	483
14	Richard Zedník	Washington Capitals; Montreal Canadiens; New York Islanders; Florida Panthers	1995–2009	745	199	179	378
15	Róbert Švehla	Florida Panthers; Toronto Maple Leafs	1994–2003	655	68	267	335
16	Ladislav Nagy	St. Louis Blues; Phoenix Coyotes; Dallas Stars; Los Angeles Kings	1999–2008	435	115	196	311
17	Marián Šťastný	Quebec Nordiques; Toronto Maple Leafs	1981–1986	322	121	173	294
18	Peter Ihnačák	Toronto Maple Leafs	1982–1990	417	102	165	267
19	Andrej Sekera	Buffalo Sabres; Carolina Hurricanes; Los Angeles Kings; Edmonton Oilers; Dallas Stars	2006–2022	842	51	202	253
20	Andrej Meszároš	Ottawa Senators; Tampa Bay Lightning; Philadelphia Flyers; Boston Bruins; Buffalo Sabres	2005–2015	645	63	175	238
21	Zdeno Cíger	New Jersey Devils; Edmonton Oilers; New York Rangers; Tampa Bay Lightning	1990–1996, 2001–2002	352	94	134	228
22	Richard Pánik	Tampa Bay Lightning; Toronto Maple Leafs; Chicago Blackhawks; Arizona Coyotes; Washington Capitals; Detroit Red Wings; New York Islanders	2012–2022	521	88	107	195
23	Tomáš Kopecký	Detroit Red Wings; Chicago Blackhawks; Florida Panthers	2005–2015	578	68	106	174
24	Marek Svatoš	Colorado Avalanche; Nashville Predators; Ottawa Senators	2003–2011	344	100	72	172
25	**Juraj Slafkovský**	**Montreal Canadiens**	2022–**present**	257	63	93	156
26	Branko Radivojevič	Phoenix Coyotes; Philadelphia Flyers; Minnesota Wild	2001–2008	399	52	68	120
27	Vladimír Országh	New York Islanders; Nashville Predators; St. Louis Blues	1997–2000, 2001–2004, 2005–2006	289	54	65	119
28	Ľuboš Bartečko	St. Louis Blues; Atlanta Thrashers	1998–2003	257	46	65	111
29	**Erik Černák**	**Tampa Bay Lightning**	2018–**present**	454	23	88	111
30	Juraj Kolník	New York Islanders; Florida Panthers	2000–2007	250	46	49	95
31	Ronald Petrovický	Calgary Flames; New York Rangers; Atlanta Thrashers; Pittsburgh Penguins	2000–2007	342	41	51	92
32	Milan Jurčina	Boston Bruins; Washington Capitals; Columbus Blue Jackets; New York Islanders	2005–2012	430	22	59	81
33	**Martin Fehérváry**	**Washington Capitals**	2019–**present**	311	23	57	80
34	Ľubomír Sekeráš	Minnesota Wild; Dallas Stars	2000–2004	213	18	53	71
35	Radoslav Suchý	Phoenix Coyotes; Columbus Blue Jackets	1999–2006	451	13	58	71
36	Róbert Petrovický	Hartford Whalers; Dallas Stars; St. Louis Blues; Tampa Bay Lightning; New York Islanders	1992–1997, 1998–2001	208	27	38	65
37	Marcel Hossa	Montreal Canadiens; New York Rangers; Phoenix Coyotes	2001–2008	237	31	30	61
38	Tomáš Surový	Pittsburgh Penguins	2002–2006	126	27	32	59
39	Tomáš Jurčo	Detroit Red Wings; Chicago Blackhawks; Edmonton Oilers; Vegas Golden Knights	2013–2018, 2019–2021	221	22	31	53
40	**Martin Pospíšil**	**Calgary Flames**	2023–**present**	144	12	37	49
41	Marko Daňo	Columbus Blue Jackets; Chicago Blackhawks; Winnipeg Jets; Colorado Avalanche	2014–2020	141	19	26	45
42	Adam Ružička	Calgary Flames; Arizona Coyotes	2020–2024	117	14	26	40
43	Martin Marinčin	Edmonton Oilers; Toronto Maple Leafs	2013–2020	227	5	29	34
44	Radovan Somík	Philadelphia Flyers	2002–2004	113	12	20	32
45	Ivan Majeský	Florida Panthers; Atlanta Thrashers; Washington Capitals	2002–2006	202	8	23	31
46	Marián Cisár	Nashville Predators	1999–2002	73	13	17	30
47	**Šimon Nemec**	**New Jersey Devils**	2023–**present**	100	5	25	30
48	Ivan Čiernik	Ottawa Senators; Washington Capitals	1997–1998, 2000–2004	89	12	14	26
49	Igor Liba	New York Rangers; Los Angeles Kings	1988–1989	37	7	18	25
50	Branislav Mezei	New York Islanders; Florida Panthers	2000–2008	240	5	19	24
51	Martin Cibák	Tampa Bay Lightning	2001–2002, 2003–2006	149	5	18	23
52	Richard Lintner	Nashville Predators; New York Rangers; Pittsburgh Penguins	1999–2001, 2002–2003	112	8	12	20
53	Miroslav Ihnačák	Toronto Maple Leafs; Detroit Red Wings	1985–1987, 1988–1989	56	8	9	17
54	Štefan Ružička	Philadelphia Flyers	2005–2008	55	4	13	17
55	Milan Bartovič	Buffalo Sabres; Chicago Blackhawks	2002–2004, 2005–2006	50	3	14	17
56	Martin Štrbák	Los Angeles Kings; Pittsburgh Penguins	2003–2004	49	5	11	16
57	Róbert Döme	Pittsburgh Penguins; Calgary Flames	1997–1998, 1999–2000, 2002–2003	53	7	7	14
58	Dušan Pašek	Minnesota North Stars	1988–1989	48	4	10	14
59	Christián Jaroš	Ottawa Senators; San Jose Sharks; New Jersey Devils	2017–2022	94	1	13	14
60	Jiří Bicek	New Jersey Devils	2000–2004	62	6	7	13
61	Peter Cehlárik	Boston Bruins	2016–2020	40	5	6	11
62	Peter Sejna	St. Louis Blues	2002–2007	48	6	4	11
63	Peter Ölvecký	Minnesota Wild; Nashville Predators	2008–2010	32	2	5	7
64	Boris Valábik	Atlanta Thrashers	2007–2010	80	0	7	7
65	Peter Bartoš	Minnesota Wild	2000–2001	13	4	2	6
66	Marián Studenič	New Jersey Devils; Dallas Stars; Seattle Kraken	2020–2024	46	3	3	6
67	Peter Smrek	St. Louis Blues; New York Rangers	2000–2002	28	2	4	6
68	Jozef Balej	Montreal Canadiens; New York Rangers; Vancouver Canucks	2003–2006	18	1	5	6
69	Andrej Nedorost	Columbus Blue Jackets	2001–2004	28	2	3	5
70	Kristián Kudroč	Tampa Bay Lightning; Florida Panthers	2000–2002, 2003–2004	26	2	2	4
71	Miroslav Zálešák	San Jose Sharks	2002–2004	12	1	2	3
72	**Pavol Regenda**	Anaheim Ducks; **San Jose Sharks**	2022–**present**	19	1	2	3
73	Vladimír Mihálik	Tampa Bay Lightning	2008–2010	15	0	3	3
74	Marek Hrivík	New York Rangers; Calgary Flames	2015–2018	24	0	3	3
75	Ľubomír Vaic	Vancouver Canucks	1997–1998, 1999–2000	9	1	1	2
76	**Samuel Honzek**	**Calgary Flames**	2024–**present**	17	1	1	2
77	Miloš Kelemen	Arizona Coyotes	2022–2024	24	1	1	2
78	Jerguš Bača	Hartford Whalers	1990–1992	10	0	2	2
79	Tomáš Malec	Carolina Hurricanes; Ottawa Senators	2002–2007	46	0	2	2
80	**Dalibor Dvorský**	**St. Louis Blues**	2025–**present**	5	1	0	1
81	Mário Bližňák	Vancouver Canucks	2009–2011	6	1	0	1
82	Andrej Podkonický	Florida Panthers; Washington Capitals	2000–2001, 2003–2004	8	1	0	1
83	Ivan Baranka	New York Rangers	2007–2008	1	0	1	1
84	Roman Tvrdoň	Washington Capitals	2003–2004	9	0	1	1
85	Ivan Droppa	Chicago Blackhawks	1993–1994, 1995–1996	19	0	1	1
86	Jozef Čierny	Edmonton Oilers	1993–1994	1	0	0	0
87	Stanislav Gron	New Jersey Devils	2000–2001	1	0	0	0
88	Milan Kytnár	Edmonton Oilers	2011–2012	1	0	0	0
89	Patrik Koch	Arizona Coyotes	2023–2024	1	0	0	0
90	Samuel Kňažko	Columbus Blue Jackets	2022–2023	2	0	0	0
91	Jaroslav Obšut	St. Louis Blues; Colorado Avalanche	2000–2002	7	0	0	0
92	Ladislav Karabin	Pittsburgh Penguins	1993–1994	9	0	0	0
93	Radoslav Hecl	Buffalo Sabres	2002–2003	14	0	0	0

Statistics are up to date as of 4th of November 2025.

== Goalies ==
Rank	Name	Team(s)	Season(s)	GP	Minutes	WLT	GAA	SV%	SO
1	Jaroslav Halák	Montreal Canadiens; St. Louis Blues; Washington Capitals; New York Islanders; Boston Bruins; Vancouver Canucks; New York Rangers	2006–2023	581	33 303	295–189–69	2.50	91.50	53
2	Peter Budaj	Colorado Avalanche; Montreal Canadiens; Los Angeles Kings; Tampa Bay Lightning	2005–2019	368	20 216	158–132–40	2.70	90.40	18
3	Ján Lašák	Nashville Predators	2001–2003	6	267	0–4–0	4.04	87.40	0
4	Rastislav Staňa	Washington Capitals	2003–2004	6	211	1–2–0	3.12	89.00	0
5	Adam Húska	New York Rangers	2021–2022	1	60	0–1–0	7.04	82.10	0

== Other records ==
=== Undrafted Slovaks that have played at least one game in the NHL ===
Rank	Name	Previous team(s)	NHL entry team	NHL debut year	GP
1	Peter Šťastný	HC Slovan Bratislava	Quebec Nordiques	1980	977
2	Radoslav Suchý	HC ŠKP PS Poprad; Las Vegas Thunder	Phoenix Coyotes	1999	451
3	Marián Šťastný	HC Slovan Bratislava; ASD Dukla Jihlava	Quebec Nordiques	1981	322
4	Ľuboš Bartečko	HC ŠKP Poprad; Worcester IceCats	St. Louis Blues	1998	257
5	Peter Sejna	HK 32 Liptovský Mikuláš; Colorado College	St. Louis Blues	2002	48
6	Marek Hrivík	HK Orange 20; Connecticut Whale; Hartford Wolf Pack	New York Rangers	2015	24
7	Miloš Kelemen	HKM Zvolen; HC Slovan Bratislava; BK Mladá Boleslav	Arizona Coyotes	2022	24
8	Pavol Regenda	Kiekko-Vantaa; HK Dukla Michalovce	Anaheim Ducks	2022	14

== See also ==
- List of NHL players
- List of NHL statistical leaders by country
- Slovakia national ice hockey team
