= Anton Šťastný =

Slovak ice hockey player

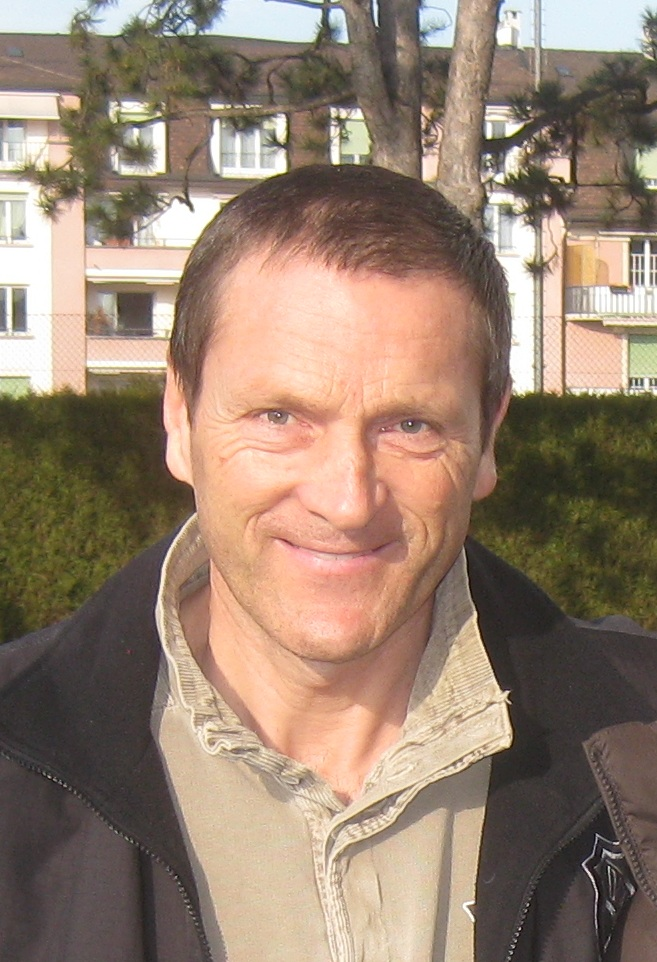
- Šťastný in 2011
- Born: August 5, 1959 (age 67) Bratislava, Czechoslovakia
- Height: 6 ft 0 in (183 cm)
- Weight: 188 lb (85 kg; 13 st 6 lb)
- Position: Left wing
- Shot: Left
- Played for: HC Slovan Bratislava; Quebec Nordiques; HC Fribourg-Gottéron; EHC Olten
- National team: Czechoslovakia and Slovakia
- NHL draft: 198th overall, 1978; Philadelphia Flyers; 83rd overall, 1979; Quebec Nordiques
- Playing career: 1976–1994

Anton Šťastný (born August 5, 1959) is a Slovak former professional ice hockey left winger who played nine seasons with the Quebec Nordiques of the National Hockey League (NHL) from 1980 until 1989. He was the first player born and trained in Slovakia to be drafted by an NHL team. He is the brother of Vladimír, Bohumil, Eva, Marián, and Peter Šťastný, and the uncle of Yan Stastny and Paul Stastny (both Peter's sons), all of whom have been involved in ice hockey at a professional level. Anton's son, Thomas Šťastný, played in Switzerland, last for Martigny in 2015.

== Playing career ==
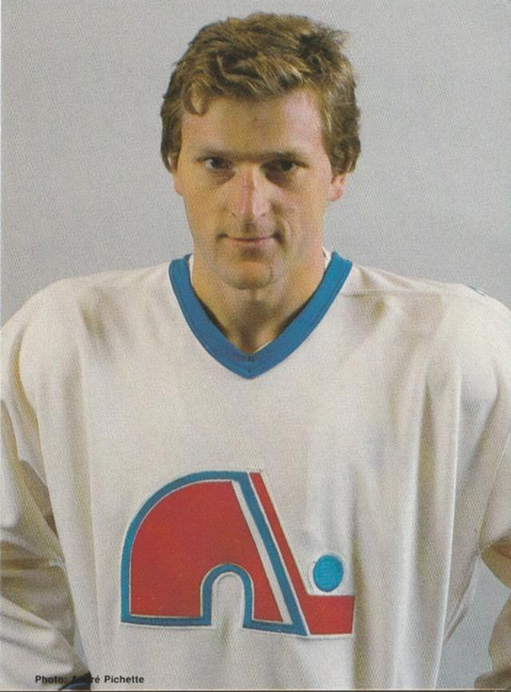
Anton Stastny in 1985 photo for Quebec Nordiques

Šťastný was originally drafted 198th overall by the Philadelphia Flyers in the 1978 NHL Amateur Draft, but the selection was ruled invalid after it was determined Šťastný was too young to be drafted. He re-entered and was drafted 83rd overall by the Nordiques in the 1979 NHL entry draft. He played 650 career NHL games, scoring 252 goals and 384 assists for 636 points and scored at least 25 goals in eight consecutive seasons.

He played his first nine seasons alongside his brother Peter, four of which were also played alongside Marián. They were the third trio of brothers to play on the same professional hockey team (the first being the Bentley brothers of the Chicago Blackhawks in the 1940s and the second being the Plager brothers of the St. Louis Blues in the 1970s). He ranks tenth overall in NHL points by a Slovak player. Anton and Peter share the rookie record for points in a game, with 8, which they accomplished in the same game against the Washington Capitals on February 22, 1981. Two days earlier, they each recorded six points against the Vancouver Canucks. These two games, played two days apart, are four out of the eleven total instances in which rookies have recorded at least six points in a game.

== Personal life ==
Anton was born in Bratislava, the fifth son of Stanislav and Frantiska. His two older brothers, Vladimir (born 1945) and Bohumil (born 1947) were born when the family still lived in the village of Pružina, about 170 kilometres northeast of Bratislava. They moved to Bratislava before the birth of Marián (1953), Peter (1956), and Eva (1966). Stanislav worked for a state-run company that built hydro-electric dams until 1980 when he retired, and mainly dealt with managing inventory. Frantiska stayed at home and raised the children.

== Career statistics ==
=== Regular season and playoffs ===
			Regular season					Playoffs
Season	Team	League	GP	G	A	Pts	PIM	GP	G	A	Pts	PIM
1977–78	Slovan ChZJD Bratislava	TCH	44	19	17	36	22	—	—	—	—	—
1978–79	Slovan ChZJD Bratislava	TCH	44	32	19	51	38	—	—	—	—	—
1979–80	Slovan ChZJD Bratislava	TCH	40	30	30	60	33	—	—	—	—	—
1980–81	Quebec Nordiques	NHL	80	39	46	85	12	5	4	3	7	2
1981–82	Quebec Nordiques	NHL	68	26	46	72	16	16	5	10	15	10
1982–83	Quebec Nordiques	NHL	79	32	60	92	25	4	2	2	4	0
1983–84	Quebec Nordiques	NHL	69	25	37	62	14	9	2	5	7	7
1984–85	Quebec Nordiques	NHL	79	38	42	80	30	16	3	3	6	6
1985–86	Quebec Nordiques	NHL	74	31	43	74	19	3	1	1	2	0
1986–87	Quebec Nordiques	NHL	77	27	35	62	8	13	3	8	11	6
1987–88	Quebec Nordiques	NHL	69	27	45	72	14	—	—	—	—	—
1988–89	Quebec Nordiques	NHL	55	7	30	37	12	—	—	—	—	—
1988–89	Halifax Citadels	AHL	16	9	5	14	4	—	—	—	—	—
1989–90	HC Fribourg–Gottéron	NDA	36	25	22	47	—	3	3	4	7	—
1990–91	EHC Olten	NDA	36	26	14	40	—	10	10	16	26	—
1991–92	EHC Olten	NDA	33	20	19	39	66	8	10	6	16	22
1993–94	HC Slovan Bratislava	SVK	11	6	8	14	2	—	—	—	—	—
TCH totals			128	81	66	147	93	—	—	—	—	—
NHL totals			650	252	384	636	150	66	20	32	52	31

=== International ===
Year	Team	Event	GP	G	A	Pts	PIM
1977	Czechoslovakia	EJC	6	6	2	8	0
1978	Czechoslovakia	WJC	6	4	2	6	4
1979	Czechoslovakia	WJC	6	3	4	7	6
1979	Czechoslovakia	WC	8	5	1	6	2
1980	Czechoslovakia	OLY	6	4	4	8	2
Junior totals			18	13	8	21	10
Senior totals			14	9	5	14	4

== See also ==
- Notable families in the NHL
- List of Slovaks in the NHL
- List of players with eight or more points in an NHL game

== Bibliography ==
- Laflamme, Robert (2012), Les Stastny: Le Coup de Génie de Gilles Léger (in French), Montreal: Hurtubise, ISBN 978-2-89647-873-6
