= Slovak Hockey Hall of Fame =

Slovak museum

The Slovak Hockey Hall of Fame (Slovak: Sieň slávy slovenského hokeja) honors the contributions that individuals have made to the sport of hockey in Slovakia. It opened on November 30, 2002. The hall is located in Bratislava, Slovakia.

== Members of the Slovak Hockey Hall of Fame ==
Name	Year	Note
Ladislav Troják	2002	
Stan Mikita	2002	
Michal Polóni	2002	
Ladislav Horský	2002	
Ján Starší	2002	
George Gross	2002	
Vladimír Dzurilla	2002	
Jozef Golonka	2002	
Václav Nedomanský	2002	
Peter Šťastný	2002	Resigned in 2009
Rastislav Jančuška	2003	
Vojtech Okoličány	2003	
Miroslav Červenka	2003	
Ján Jendek	2003	
František Gregor	2004	
Karol Fako	2004	
Vincent Lukáč	2004	
Milan Kužela	2004	
Jaroslav Walter	2005	
Igor Liba	2005	
Rudolf Tajcnár	2006	
Dušan Pašek	2007	
Dušan Faško	2008	
Dárius Rusnák	2009	
Ján Mitošinka	2011	
Július Haas	2011	
Róbert Švehla	2011	
Pavol Demitra	2012	
Zdeno Cíger	2014	
Miroslav Šatan	2018	
Július Šupler	2019	
Ján Filc	2019	
Oto Haščák	2019	
Ferdinand Marek	2019	
Peter Bondra	2021	
Žigmund Pálffy	2022	
Marián Hossa	2023	
Ľubomír Višňovský	2024	
Zdeno Chára	2025	
Pavol Siroťák	2025	
Craig Ramsay	2026	
Michal Handzuš	2026	

== See also ==
- Slovakia national ice hockey team
