= 1945–46 Czechoslovak Extraliga season =

Czechoslovak ice hockey season

The 1945–46 Czechoslovak Extraliga season was the third season of the Czechoslovak Extraliga the top level of ice hockey in Czechoslovakia. 12 teams participated in the league, and LTC Prag won the championship. Due to World War II, it was the first time since 1937–38 the league had been played.

== Regular season ==
=== Group A ===
| Pl. | Team | GP | W | T | L | GF–GA | Pts |
|---|---|---|---|---|---|---|---|
| 1. | LTC Prag | 5 | 5 | 0 | 0 | 30–8 | 10 |
| 2. | ŠK Bratislava | 5 | 4 | 0 | 1 | 22–9 | 8 |
| 3. | AC Stadion České Budějovice | 5 | 3 | 0 | 2 | 9–7 | 6 |
| 4. | SK Podolí Prag | 5 | 1 | 1 | 3 | 11–16 | 3 |
| 5. | HC Stadion Prag | 5 | 1 | 1 | 3 | 8–14 | 3 |
| 6. | ŠK Banská Bystrica | 5 | 0 | 0 | 5 | 9–35 | 0 |

=== Group B ===
| Pl. | Team | GP | W | T | L | GF–GA | Pts |
|---|---|---|---|---|---|---|---|
| 1. | I. ČLTK Prag | 5 | 4 | 0 | 1 | 35–10 | 8 |
| 2. | AC Sparta Prag | 5 | 3 | 1 | 1 | 20–16 | 7 |
| 3. | VŠ Bratislava | 5 | 2 | 0 | 3 | 15–14 | 4 |
| 4. | DSK Tábor | 5 | 2 | 0 | 3 | 12–21 | 4 |
| 5. | HC Tatry Poprad | 5 | 1 | 2 | 2 | 12–27 | 2 |
| 6. | SK Prostějov | 5 | 0 | 1 | 4 | 6–12 | 1 |

== Final ==
- LTC Prag 3 CLTK Prag 1

== 1. Liga-Qualification ==
| Place | Team | Pts |
|---|---|---|
| 1. | SK Horácká Slavia Třebíč | 4 |
| 2. | SK Libeň | 2 |
| 3. | TKNB Bratislava | 0 |
