= 2003–04 IIHF Continental Cup =

The Continental Cup 2003–04 was the seventh edition of the IIHF Continental Cup. The season started on September 26, 2003, and finished on January 11, 2004.

The tournament was won by HC Slovan Bratislava, who beat HK Gomel in the final.

== Preliminary round ==
=== Group A ===
(Novi Sad, Serbia and Montenegro)

Team #1	Score	Team #2
KHL Zagreb (Croatia)	3:2	(Romania) SC Miercurea Ciuc
HK Novi Sad (Serbia and Montenegro)	5:1	(Bulgaria) HC Slavia Sofia
SC Miercurea Ciuc (Romania)	17:0	(Bulgaria) HC Slavia Sofia
HK Novi Sad (Serbia and Montenegro)	4:8	(Croatia) KHL Zagreb
KHL Zagreb (Croatia)	13:2	(Bulgaria) HC Slavia Sofia
HK Novi Sad (Serbia and Montenegro)	2:4	(Romania) SC Miercurea Ciuc

=== Group A standings ===
Rank	Team	Points
1	(Croatia) KHL Zagreb	6
2	(Romania) SC Miercurea Ciuc	4
3	(Serbia and Montenegro) HK Novi Sad	2
4	(Bulgaria) HC Slavia Sofia	0

=== Group B ===
(Amiens, France)

Team #1	Score	Team #2
Odense Bulldogs (Denmark)	3:1	(Slovenia) HK Slavija Ljubljana
Gothiques d'Amiens (France)	12:4	(Romania) Steaua București
Odense Bulldogs (Denmark)	7:0	(Romania) Steaua București
Gothiques d'Amiens (France)	6:0	(Slovenia) HK Slavija Ljubljana
Steaua București (Romania)	4:2	(Slovenia) HK Slavija Ljubljana
Gothiques d'Amiens (France)	5:4	(Denmark) Odense Bulldogs

=== Group B standings ===
Rank	Team	Points
1	(France) Gothiques d'Amiens	6
2	(Denmark) Odense Bulldogs	4
3	(Romania) Steaua București	2
4	(Slovenia) HK Slavija Ljubljana	0

=== Group C ===
(Barcelona, Spain)

Team #1	Score	Team #2
CH Jaca (Spain)	5:16	(Netherlands) Boretti Tigers Amsterdam
FC Barcelona (Spain)	4:4	(Belgium) Phantoms Deurne
Boretti Tigers Amsterdam (Netherlands)	14:0	(Belgium) Phantoms Deurne
FC Barcelona (Spain)	3:5	(Spain) CH Jaca
CH Jaca (Spain)	3:8	(Belgium) Phantoms Deurne
FC Barcelona (Spain)	2:23	(Netherlands) Boretti Tigers Amsterdam

=== Group C standings ===
Rank	Team	Points
1	(Netherlands) Boretti Tigers Amsterdam	6
2	(Belgium) Phantoms Deurne	3
3	(Spain) CH Jaca	2
4	(Spain) FC Barcelona	1

=== Group D ===
(Zagreb, Croatia)

Team #1	Score	Team #2
Dunaferr SE (Hungary)	8:0	(Bulgaria) HC Levski Sofia
KHL Medveščak Zagreb (Croatia)	23:0	(Israel) HC Ma'alot
Dunaferr SE (Hungary)	25:1	(Israel) HC Ma'alot
KHL Medveščak Zagreb (Croatia)	9:0	(Bulgaria) HC Levski Sofia
HC Levski Sofia (Bulgaria)	6:3	(Israel) HC Ma'alot
KHL Medveščak Zagreb (Croatia)	1:4	(Hungary) Dunaferr SE

=== Group D standings ===
Rank	Team	Points
1	(Hungary) Dunaferr SE	6
2	(Croatia) KHL Medveščak Zagreb	4
3	(Bulgaria) HC Levski Sofia	2
4	(Israel) HC Ma'alot	0

=== Group E ===
(Riga, Latvia)

Team #1	Score	Team #2
Kazakhmys Karaganda (Kazakhstan)	0:0	(Poland) Stoczniowiec Gdańsk
HK Riga 2000 (Latvia)	13:3	(Lithuania) SC Energija
Kazakhmys Karaganda (Kazakhstan)	3:1	(Lithuania) SC Energija
HK Riga 2000 (Latvia)	7:3	(Poland) Stoczniowiec Gdańsk
Stoczniowiec Gdańsk (Poland)	5:3	(Lithuania) SC Energija
HK Riga 2000 (Latvia)	2:2	(Kazakhstan) Kazakhmys Karaganda

=== Group E standings ===
Rank	Team	Points
1	(Latvia) HK Riga 2000	5
2	(Kazakhstan) Kazakhmys Karaganda	4
3	(Poland) Stoczniowiec Gdańsk	3
4	(Lithuania) SC Energija	0

== First Group Stage ==
=== Group F ===
(Oświęcim, Poland)

Team #1	Score	Team #2
HK Liepājas Metalurgs (Latvia)	4:2	(Italy) HC Milano Vipers
Dwory Unia Oświęcim (Poland)	5:2	(Latvia) HK Liepājas Metalurgs
Dwory Unia Oświęcim (Poland)	3:3	(Italy) HC Milano Vipers

=== Group F standings * ===
Rank	Team	Points
1	(Poland) Dwory Unia Oświęcim	3
2	(Latvia) HK Liepājas Metalurgs	2
3	(Italy) HC Milano Vipers	1

*: (Croatia) KHL Zagreb was disqualified

=== Group G ===
(Rouen, France)

Team #1	Score	Team #2
Gothiques d'Amiens (France)	3:2	(Italy) AS Asiago
Dragons de Rouen (France)	0:0	(Netherlands) Boretti Tigers Amsterdam
Boretti Tigers Amsterdam (Netherlands)	6:0	(Italy) AS Asiago
Dragons de Rouen (France)	4:2	(France) Gothiques d'Amiens
Gothiques d'Amiens (France)	3:2	(Netherlands) Boretti Tigers Amsterdam
Dragons de Rouen (France)	4:0	(Italy) AS Asiago

=== Group G standings ===
Rank	Team	Points
1	(France) Dragons de Rouen	5
2	(France) Gothiques d'Amiens	4
3	(Netherlands) Boretti Tigers Amsterdam	3
4	(Italy) AS Asiago	0

=== Group H ===
(Székesfehérvár, Hungary)

Team #1	Score	Team #2
Kazzinc-Torpedo (Kazakhstan)	6:1	(Slovenia) HDD Olimpija Ljubljana
Alba Volán Székesfehérvár (Hungary)	5:1	(Hungary) Dunaferr SE
Dunaferr SE (Hungary)	1:1	(Slovenia) HDD Olimpija Ljubljana
Alba Volán Székesfehérvár (Hungary)	2:2	(Kazakhstan) Kazzinc-Torpedo
Alba Volán Székesfehérvár (Hungary)	2:0	(Slovenia) HDD Olimpija Ljubljana
Dunaferr SE (Hungary)	4:5	(Kazakhstan) Kazzinc-Torpedo

=== Group H standings ===
Rank	Team	Points	GF
1	(Kazakhstan) Kazzinc-Torpedo	5	13
2	(Hungary) Alba Volán Székesfehérvár	5	9
3	(Hungary) Dunaferr SE	1	
4	(Slovenia) HDD Olimpija Ljubljana	1	

=== Group I ===
(Detva, Slovakia)

Team #1	Score	Team #2
Jukurit (Finland)	2:1	(Ukraine) Sokil Kiev
HKm Zvolen (Slovakia)	2:0	(Latvia) HK Riga 2000
Jukurit (Finland)	1:1	(Latvia) HK Riga 2000
HKm Zvolen (Slovakia)	0:4	(Ukraine) Sokil Kiev
Sokil Kiev (Ukraine)	7:2	(Latvia) HK Riga 2000
HKm Zvolen (Slovakia)	0:5	(Finland) Jukurit

=== Group I standings ===
Rank	Team	Points
1	(Finland) Jukurit	5
2	(Ukraine) Sokil Kiev	4
3	(Slovakia) HKm Zvolen	2
4	(Latvia) HK Riga 2000	1

(Norway) Vålerenga, (Denmark) Herning Blue Fox, (Belarus) Keramin Minsk, (Austria) EHC Black Wings Linz : bye

== Second Group Stage ==
=== Group J ===
(Herning, Denmark)

Team #1	Score	Team #2
Vålerenga (Norway)	1:1	(Poland) Dwory Unia Oświęcim
Herning Blue Fox (Denmark)	4:1	(France) Dragons de Rouen
Dragons de Rouen (France)	6:1	(Norway) Vålerenga
Herning Blue Fox (Denmark)	1:3	(Poland) Dwory Unia Oświęcim
Dragons de Rouen (France)	7:3	(Poland) Dwory Unia Oświęcim
Herning Blue Fox (Denmark)	1:3	(Norway) Vålerenga

=== Group J standings ===
Rank	Team	Points
1	(France) Dragons de Rouen	4
2	(Poland) Dwory Unia Oświęcim	3
3	(Norway) Vålerenga	3
4	(Denmark) Herning Blue Fox	2

=== Group K ===
(Linz, Austria)

Team #1	Score	Team #2
Keramin Minsk (Belarus)	4:1	(Finland) Jukurit
EHC Black Wings Linz (Austria)	1:1	(Kazakhstan) Kazzinc-Torpedo
EHC Black Wings Linz (Austria)	3:2	(Finland) Jukurit
Keramin Minsk (Belarus)	1:1	(Kazakhstan) Kazzinc-Torpedo
EHC Black Wings Linz (Austria)	1:3	(Belarus) Keramin Minsk
Kazzinc-Torpedo (Kazakhstan)	7:3	(Finland) Jukurit

=== Group K standings ===
Rank	Team	Points
1	(Belarus) Keramin Minsk	5
2	(Kazakhstan) Kazzinc-Torpedo	4
3	(Austria) EHC Black Wings Linz	3
4	(Finland) Jukurit	0

(Belarus) HK Gomel, (Switzerland) HC Lugano, (Slovakia) HC Slovan Bratislava, (Russia) Severstal Cherepovets : bye

== Third Stage ==
(Gomel, Belarus)

=== Group M ===
Team #1	Score	Team #2
HK Gomel (Belarus)	6:2	(France) Dragons de Rouen
HC Lugano (Switzerland)	7:1	(France) Dragons de Rouen
HK Gomel (Belarus)	3:2	(Switzerland) HC Lugano

=== Group M standings ===
Rank	Team	Points
1	(Belarus) HK Gomel	4
2	(Switzerland) HC Lugano	2
3	(France) Dragons de Rouen	0

=== Group N ===
Team #1	Score	Team #2
Keramin Minsk (Belarus)	2:3	(Slovakia) HC Slovan Bratislava
Keramin Minsk (Belarus)	2:8	(Russia) Severstal Cherepovets
HC Slovan Bratislava (Slovakia)	5:3	(Russia) Severstal Cherepovets

=== Group N standings ===
Rank	Team	Points
1	(Slovakia) HC Slovan Bratislava	4
2	(Russia) Severstal Cherepovets	2
3	(Belarus) Keramin Minsk	0

== Final stage ==
(Gomel, Belarus)

=== Fifth place match ===
Team #1	Score	Team #2
Keramin Minsk (Belarus)	5:0	(France) Dragons de Rouen

=== Third place match ===
Team #1	Score	Team #2
HC Lugano (Switzerland)	2:1	(Russia) Severstal Cherepovets

=== Final ===
Team #1	Score	Team #2
HK Gomel (Belarus)	2:6	(Slovakia) HC Slovan Bratislava
