= Slovak League (ice hockey) =

- Sport: Ice hockey
- First season: 1938
- Folded: 1944
- No. of teams: 4
- Country: (Slovakia) Slovak Republic
- Last champions: OAP Bratislava (1943–44)
- Most titles: VŠ Bratislava (2); ŠK Bratislava (2); OAP Bratislava (2)

The Slovak League was the ice hockey league in the Slovak Republic from 1938–1944.

== Champions ==
- 1938–39 – VŠ Bratislava
- 1939–40 – VŠ Bratislava
- 1940–41 – ŠK Bratislava
- 1941–42 – ŠK Bratislava
- 1942–43 – OAP Bratislava
- 1943–44 – OAP Bratislava

== Results ==
=== 1938–39 ===
Final:

- VŠ Bratislava – ŠK Banská Bystrica 1–0

=== 1939–40 ===
	Club	Pts
1.	VŠ Bratislava	6
2.	Slávia Prešov	4
3.	ŠK Banská Bystrica	2
4.	Dolnokubinsky SK	0

=== 1940–41 ===
	Club	Pts
1.	ŠK Bratislava	6
2.	Slávia Prešov	3
3.	ŠK Žilina	1
4.	ŠK Banská Bystrica	0

=== 1941–42 ===
Place	Team	GP	W	T	L	GF	GA	Pts
1.	ŠK Bratislava	3	2	1	0	10	6	5
2.	HC Tatry	3	2	0	1	11	6	4
3.	VŠ Bratislava	3	1	0	2	6	10	2
4.	Slávia Prešov	3	0	1	2	4	9	1

=== 1942–43 ===
Place	Team	GP	W	T	L	GF	GA	Pts
1.	OAP Bratislava	3	3	0	0	15	6	6
2.	ŠK Bratislava	3	2	0	1	11	4	4
3.	HC Tatry	3	1	0	2	12	10	2
4.	ŠK Banská Bystrica	3	0	0	3	6	24	0

=== 1943–44 ===
Place	Team	GP	W	T	L	GF	GA	Pts
1.	OAP Bratislava	3	2	0	1	14	7	4
2.	ŠK Bratislava	3	2	0	1	5	6	4
3.	HC Tatry	3	1	0	2	5	6	2
4.	ŠK Banská Bystrica	3	1	0	2	6	11	2
