= Ladislav Horský =

- Born: 18 September 1927; Valaská, Czechoslovakia
- Died: 24 September 1983 (aged 56); Brno, Czech Republic
- Honors: IIHF Hall of Fame (2004)
Ice hockey career
- Playing career: 1942–1958

Ladislav Horský (born 18 September 1927 in Valaská – 24 September 1983 in Brno) was a Slovak ice hockey player and coach. As a coach, he helped lead HC Slovan Bratislava to their first Czechoslovak title in 1978–1979 and was inducted posthumously into the IIHF Hall of Fame in 2004.

== Career ==
Starting as an ice hockey player, Horský played in many teams in Bratislava and Prague from 1942 to 1958. He played for ŠK Brezno, VŠ Bratislava, HC Slovan Bratislava, ATK Praha, and Tankista Praha before retiring in 1958. In 1947, Horský took a break from playing hockey to do an education at the Comenius University. He studied physical education and geography. Horský played hockey while studying at a university before playing in the Prague Army Sports Club (ATK) while serving a military service. After he finished his studies at the Comenius University, Horský worked as a teacher in 1952 at Telč Institute and later served as a head of the Physical Education and Sports Department at the University of Economics in Bratislava starting in 1956. After leaving the army, Horský rejoined Slovan Bratislava but was forced to retire in 1958 after getting hit by a puck. Later he became a coach of different teams in Czechoslovak and German leagues.

He also coached and had different positions in Czechoslovak national senior and junior teams. While he was coaching for many years in the Czechoslovak league, he helped lead HC Slovan Bratislava to their first Czechoslovak title in 1978-1979.

Horský was offered a position in North America in 1982 at the University of Wisconsin but died a year later. Before his death, however, he published many books about theoretical and methodical aspects of hockey and lectured internationally in Canada, the United States, and the former Soviet Union.

In 2004, Horský was inducted posthumously into the IIHF Hall of Fame as a builder.
