= George Gross (journalist) =

Canadian sports journalist (1923–2008)

- Born: January 23, 1923; Bratislava, Czechoslovakia
- Died: March 21, 2008 (aged 85); Etobicoke, Ontario, Canada
- Occupation: Journalist
- Years active: 1950s–2008
- Employer(s): Toronto Sun, Toronto Telegram
- Awards: Elmer Ferguson Memorial Award (1985); Olympic Order (1994); Slovak Hockey Hall of Fame (2002); Order of Ontario (2003); Canadian Sports Hall of Fame (2005); Canada Soccer Hall of Fame (2006)
- Honours: George Gross Memorial Trophy

George Gross O.Ont (born Juraj Gross; January 23, 1923 – March 21, 2008) was a Slovak-born Canadian sports journalist and soccer executive. He worked for several newspapers, most notably the Toronto Sun. He was a co-founder of the Eastern Canada Professional Soccer League.

== Early life and defection ==
Gross was born in Bratislava, Slovakia in January 1923. As a journalist in Bratislava, he had been jailed by the post-Second World War Communist regime in Czechoslovakia for his political views. He eventually escaped from Austria by rowing, or swimming, across the Danube River. Upon arriving in Canada, he earned a position as a farm hand but was unable to work the cultivator.

Following the conclusion of World War II, Gross worked as a young political and sports writer in Bratislava. His published criticisms of the rising communist regime led to a brief period of imprisonment.

In 1949, Gross and a companion orchestrated an escape from Czechoslovakia by posing as local kayakers out for a routine training run on the Danube River, successfully rowing across the border into Austria. He arrived in Canada in 1950 with minimal English skills and $4.50 to his name, initially taking jobs as a farmhand and construction worker while self-teaching the language.

== Career ==
After being fired as a farm hand, Gross accepted a freelance position with the Toronto Telegram, where he was eventually hired full-time in 1959. Once the Telegram went bankrupt, he became the first sports editor at the Toronto Sun. During his time with the Sun, Gross won the 1974 National Newspaper Award, Dunlop Award, and authored three books.

While working as the corporate sports editor for the Toronto Sun, Gross achieved a major international media exclusive during the 1988 Summer Olympics in Seoul. Following Canadian sprinter Ben Johnson's positive test for anabolic steroids and subsequent disqualification, Gross bypassed hundreds of international journalists to secure the first exclusive, in-home interview with the athlete. Published in the Toronto Sun, the interview provided the first public window into Johnson's direct claims regarding his training inner circle.

In addition to print journalism, Gross was a regular guest contributor and press-box analyst on television broadcasts for CBC's Hockey Night in Canada during the late 1970s and 1980s.

In 1985, Gross was inducted into the Hockey Hall of Fame, winning the Elmer Ferguson Memorial Award. The next year, Gross was promoted to corporate sports editor with a weekly column. In 1994, he received the Olympic Order, and he was inducted into the Slovak Hockey Hall of Fame as well as the Etobicoke Sports Hall of Fame in 2002. In 2003, he was presented with the Order of Ontario. In 2005, Gross was inducted into the Canadian Sports Hall of Fame, and in April 2006, Gross was inducted as a builder into the Canada Soccer Hall of Fame.

In 2004, the Toronto Sun began its annual George Gross/Toronto Sun Sportsperson of the Year award.

Shortly after his death in 2008, the Canadian Soccer Association created the George Gross Memorial Trophy, awarded to the most valuable player of the annual Canadian Championship. As well, Tennis Canada renamed the Rexall Centre, the George Gross Media Centre.

== Personal life and death ==
Gross married Elizabeth and had a daughter, and a son, George Jr. His son also worked in sports and media, competing as a two-time Canadian Olympic water polo player (1976 and 1984) and later as an on-air television broadcaster. Outside of his journalism career, Gross volunteered for numerous charitable organizations, including the Conacher Cancer Fund, the Special Olympics, the Easter Seals Society, and the Save the Children Fund.

On March 21, 2008, Gross died suddenly of a heart attack at the age of 85. He suffered the fatal heart attack while at the Toronto Sun newsroom, where he had collapsed at his desk while preparing to write his weekly column.

== Awards and honours ==
In July 2008, Tennis Canada announced that the media operations hub located at the Rexall Centre (now Sobeys Stadium) in Toronto would be permanently renamed the George Gross Media Centre.

The annual George Gross-Don Goodwin Award was established by Sports Media Canada to recognize career achievement across various disciplines in outstanding Canadian sports journalism, including broadcasting, photography, and sportswriting.

== Bibliography ==
- Toronto Olympiad For The Handicapped (1976)
- Donald Jackson: King of Blades. Queen City Publishing. (1977). ISBN 9780969050810.
- Hockey Night in Canada: The 1982–83 Season. CBC Enterprises. (1982). ISBN 9780887941092.
