= 1947–48 Czechoslovak Extraliga season =

Czechoslovak ice hockey season

The 1947–48 Czechoslovak Extraliga season was the fifth season of the Czechoslovak Extraliga, the top level of ice hockey in Czechoslovakia. 12 teams participated in the league, and LTC Prag won the championship.

== Regular season ==
=== Group A ===
Pl.	Team	GP	W	T	L	GF–GA	Pts
1.	I. ČLTK Prag	5	5	0	0	61:6	10
2.	HC Stadion Podolí	5	3	0	2	52:11	6
3.	SK Prostějov	5	3	0	2	28:24	6
4.	SK Horácká Slavia Třebíč	5	2	1	2	13:29	5
5.	VŠ Bratislava	5	1	1	3	12:29	3
6.	ŠK Banská Bystrica	5	0	0	5	6:63	0

=== Group B ===
Pl.	Team	GP	W	T	L	GF–GA	Pts
1.	LTC Prag	5	5	0	0	55:7	10
2.	ŠK Bratislava	5	3	1	1	28:21	7
3.	AC Sparta Prag	5	3	0	2	23:18	6
4.	AC Stadion České Budějovice	5	2	1	2	32:16	5
5.	ČSK Říčany	5	1	0	4	10:31	2
6.	BK Havlíčkův Brod	5	0	0	5	13:68	0

== Final ==
- LTC Prag – I. ČLTK Prag 7:1
- I. ČLTK Praha – LTC Prag 5:13
