= 1976 Ice Hockey World Championships =

1976 edition of the World Ice Hockey Championships

Tournament details
- Host country: Poland
- Dates: 8–25 April
- Teams: 8

Final positions
- Champions: Czechoslovakia (4th title)
- Runners-up: Soviet Union
- Third place: Sweden
- Fourth place: United States

Tournament statistics
- Games played: 40
- Goals scored: 289 (7.23 per game)
- Attendance: 219,000 (5,475 per game)
- Scoring leader: (Czechoslovakia) Vladimír Martinec 20 points

The 1976 Ice Hockey World Championships were the 43rd Ice Hockey World Championships and the 54th European Championships in ice hockey. The tournament took place in Poland from 8 to 25 April, and the games were played in Katowice. Eight teams took part in the main tournament, with each team first playing each other once. The four best teams then took part in a medal play off, and the teams placed 5–8 took part in a relegation play-off. The teams took the results from the first round through to the second round with them.

In response to charges of the rules regarding amateurism being unfair a change was implemented for this year. The 1976 IHWC tournament was first to feature major league professionals from the NHL and WHA, although in the end only the United States made use of the new rule, recalling eight pros from the Minnesota North Stars and Minnesota Fighting Saints. Some nations, such as the Soviet Union, had been using pros all along, while circumventing their status by listing them in the military. The Americans promptly made the medal play off for the first time since 1962 after beating Sweden and tying Finland in the first round.

The Czechoslovakia national ice hockey team won nine games and were unbeaten, becoming world champions for the fourth time. The defending champions from the USSR finished 2nd after sensationally losing the opening game 4–6 to hosts Poland. Sweden won the bronze after beating the Americans 7-3 in the medal round. In the European standings Sweden moved up one position leaving the Soviets with the bronze for the first time ever.

== World Championship Group A (Poland) ==
=== First round ===
Pos	Team	Pld	W	D	L	GF	GA	GD	Pts
1	Czechoslovakia	7	7	0	0	54	7	+47	14
2	Soviet Union	7	5	0	2	37	15	+22	10
3	Sweden	7	4	0	3	22	18	+4	8
4	United States	7	3	1	3	19	23	−4	7
5	Poland	7	2	1	4	21	36	−15	5
6	West Germany	7	2	0	5	19	35	−16	4
7	Finland	7	1	2	4	17	29	−12	4
8	East Germany	7	2	0	5	11	37	−26	4

8 April	West Germany	1-4 (0-1, 0-1, 1-2)	Sweden

	0–1	15:15 - Lars-Gunnar Lundberg
	0–2	24:49 - Dan Labraaten
Erich Kühnhackl - 40:39	1–2
	1–3	54:37 - Roland Eriksson
	1–4	56:44 - Hans Jax

8 April	Czechoslovakia	10-0	East Germany

8 April	United States	3-3 (0-2, 2-0, 1-1)	Finland

	0–1	00:17 - Hannu Kapanen
	0–2	14:13 - Timo Nummelin
Brad Morrow - 27:56	1–2
William Schneider - 35:39	2–2
Bill Klatt - 45:07	3–2
	3–3	49:04 - Tapio Koskinen

8 April	Poland	6-4 (2-0, 3-2, 1-2)	Soviet Union

M. Jaskierski - 10:27	1–0
R. Nowiński - 14:33	2–0
	2–1	20:39 - Boris Mikhailov
W. Jobczyk - 22:45	3–1
M. Jaskierski - 23:06	4–1
	4–2	25:16 - Alexander Yakushev
W. Jobczyk - 26:48	5–2
	5–3	53:50 - Valeri Kharlamov
W. Jobczyk - 58:57	6–3
	6–4	59:09 - Boris Mikhailov

30
Shots
37

9 April	Poland	0-12 (0-2, 0-2, 0-8)	Czechoslovakia

0–1	17:53 – Jiří Holík
0–2	19:43 – Peter Šťastný
0–3	24:19 – Jiří Novák
0–4	25:44 – Jiří Holík
0–5	40:56 – Peter Šťastný
0–6	42:00 – Vladimír Martinec
0–7	45:36 – Jiří Novák
0–8	47:46 – Jiří Bubla
0–9	50:52 – Bohuslav Šťastný
0–10	53:55 – Jiří Novák
0–11	54:32 – František Černík
0–12	59:47 – Ivan Hlinka

9 April	Soviet Union	4-0 (1-0, 1-0, 2-0)	East Germany

Viktor Zhluktov – 13:00	1–0
Valeri Kharlamov – 25:50	2–0
Boris Mikhailov – 52:50	3–0
Segey Kapustin – 57:29	4–0

10 April	West Germany	2-5 (1-0, 1-3, 0-2)	Finland

Erich Kühnhackl – 11:26	1–0
Erich Kühnhackl – 25:44	2–0
	2–1	32:56 – Timo Nummelin
	2–2	38:06 – Jouni Peltonen
	2–3	39:40 – Matti Murto
	2–4	40:11 – Matti Murto
	2–5	43:50 – Jouni Rinne

10 April	Sweden	0-2 (0-1, 0-0, 0-1)	United States

0–1 / 18:24 – Sarner; 0–2 / 47:57 – Klatt

11 April	Poland	6-4 (3-0, 2-2, 1-2)	East Germany

Potz – 01:18	1–0
Jobczyk – 04:14	2–0
Kokoszka – 18:25	3–0
Marcińczak – 21:25	4–0
	4–1	24:24 – Stasche
Ziętara – 38:00	5–1
	5–2	38:25 – Stasche
	5–3	47:20 – Patschinski
	5–4	55:40 – Slapke
Jobczyk – 56:54	6–4

11 April	Finland	1-8 (0-1, 1-3, 0-4)	Soviet Union

	0–1	13:25 – Zhluktov
	0–2	22:02 – Korotkov
Leppä – 33:59	1–2
	1–3	34:24 – Maltsev
	1–4	37:47 – Shalimov
	1–5	54:14 – Lutchenko
	1–6	56:01 – Lyapkin
	1–7	56:53 – Zhluktov
	1–8	59:19 – Balderis

11 April	Czechoslovakia	3-1 (0-0, 2-0, 1-1)	Sweden

Chalupa – 25:40	1–0
Nový – 34:42	2–0
Martinec – 50:07	3–0
	3–1	54:31 – Jax

12 April	Poland	3-5 (1-2, 1-1, 1-2)	West Germany

Kokoszka – 03:45	1–0
	1–1	08:51 – Köberle
	1–2	14:24 – Kühnhackl
Góralczyk – 31:59	2–2
	2–3	Philipp – 35:56
	2–4	Kretschner – 42:50
	2–5	Köberle – 53:30
Góralczyk – 55:24	3–5

12 April	East Germany	2-1 (0-0, 0-0, 2-1)	United States

Patschinski – 40:53	1–0
Müller – 45:35	2–0
	2–1	57:56 – Klatt

13 April	Czechoslovakia	7-1 (1-1, 4-0, 2-0)	Finland

	0–1	01:20 – Koskinen
Martinec – 19:53	1–1
Holík – 21:44	2–1
Nový – 28:12	3–1
Nový – 31:03	4–1
Šťastný – 35:20	5–1
Bubla – 43:37	6–1
Šťastný – 59:25	7–1

13 April	Soviet Union	6-1 (2-0, 2-0, 2-1)	Sweden

Maltsev – 03:49	1–0
Mikhailov – 07:25	2–0
Maltsev – 24:10	3–0
Yakushev – 24:32	4–0
Mikhailov – 44:01	5–0
Shalimov – 49:36	6–0
	6–1	50:59 – Lundberg

14 April	Poland	2-4 (0-2, 1-1, 1-1)	United States

	0–1	02:38 – Younghans
	0–2	04:56 – Jensen
Jobczyk – 26:39	1–2
	1–3	27:17 – Schneider
	1–4	49:06 – Ross
Góralczyk – 51:45	2–4

14 April	East Germany	1-7	West Germany

15 April	Finland	3-4	Sweden

15 April	United States	2-10	Czechoslovakia

15 April	West Germany	2-8	Soviet Union

17 April	Sweden	8-2	East Germany

17 April	Poland	3-3	Finland

17 April	Soviet Union	2-3	Czechoslovakia

18 April	United States	5-1	West Germany

18 April	Finland	1-2	East Germany

19 April	Czechoslovakia	9-1	West Germany

19 April	Poland	1-4	Sweden

19 April	Soviet Union	5-2	United States

=== Final Round 1–4 place ===
Pos	Team	Pld	W	D	L	GF	GA	GD	Pts
1	Czechoslovakia	10	9	1	0	67	14	+53	19
2	Soviet Union	10	6	1	3	50	23	+27	13
3	Sweden	10	6	0	4	36	29	+7	12
4	United States	10	3	1	6	24	42	−18	7

21 April	Czechoslovakia	5-1	United States

21 April	Soviet Union	3-4	Sweden

23 April	Sweden	3-5	Czechoslovakia

23 April	United States	1-7	Soviet Union

25 April	Sweden	7-3	United States

25 April	Czechoslovakia	3-3	Soviet Union

=== Consolation Round 5–8 place ===
Pos	Team	Pld	W	D	L	GF	GA	GD	Pts
5	Finland	10	2	4	4	35	41	−6	8 (Note: 5 head-to-head points)
6	West Germany	10	3	2	5	26	41	−15	8 (Note: 5 head-to-head points)
7	Poland	10	3	2	5	32	47	−15	8 (Note: 2 head-to-head points)
8	East Germany	10	2	1	7	19	52	−33	5

Notes:

East Germany was relegated to Group B. Poland was also relegated to make room for the return of team Canada.

20 April	Poland	5-4	East Germany

20 April	Finland	4-4	West Germany

22 April	Poland	5-5	Finland

22 April	East Germany	1-1	West Germany

24 April	Finland	9-3	East Germany

24 April	Poland	1-2	West Germany

== World Championship Group B (Switzerland) ==
Played in Aarau and Bienne 18–27 March.

Pos	Team	Pld	W	D	L	GF	GA	GD	Pts
9	Romania	7	5	1	1	40	23	+17	11
10	Japan	7	5	0	2	34	17	+17	10
11	Norway	7	4	0	3	29	21	+8	8
12	Switzerland	7	4	0	3	25	28	−3	8
13	Yugoslavia	7	4	0	3	37	26	+11	8
14	Netherlands	7	3	0	4	22	30	−8	6
15	Italy	7	2	1	4	23	41	−18	5
16	Bulgaria	7	0	0	7	23	47	−24	0

Romania was promoted to Group A, and both Italy and Bulgaria were relegated to Group C.

18 March	Netherlands	4-3	Norway

18 March	Switzerland	5-1	Bulgaria

18 March	Italy	2-8	Yugoslavia

18 March	Romania	7-5	Japan

19 March	Italy	8-3	Bulgaria

19 March	Switzerland	5-4	Yugoslavia

20 March	Japan	4-0	Netherlands

20 March	Romania	2-1	Norway

21 March	Yugoslavia	5-2	Romania

21 March	Switzerland	4-2	Netherlands

21 March	Italy	4-2	Norway

21 March	Bulgaria	3-4	Japan

22 March	Yugoslavia	9-7	Bulgaria

22 March	Switzerland	4-1	Italy

23 March	Romania	8-1	Netherlands

23 March	Norway	3-2	Japan

24 March	Romania	5-5	Italy

24 March	Japan	3-2	Yugoslavia

24 March	Netherlands	5-3	Bulgaria

24 March	Switzerland	3-7	Norway

26 March	Japan	10-0	Italy

26 March	Norway	7-2	Bulgaria

26 March	Netherlands	1-5	Yugoslavia

26 March	Switzerland	2-7	Romania

27 March	Norway	6-4	Yugoslavia

27 March	Switzerland	2-6	Japan

27 March	Romania	9-4	Bulgaria

27 March	Netherlands	9-3	Italy

== World Championship Group C (Poland) ==
Played in Gdańsk 8–13 March.

Pos	Team	Pld	W	D	L	GF	GA	GD	Pts
17	Austria	4	4	0	0	38	9	+29	8
18	Hungary	4	3	0	1	30	9	+21	6
19	France	4	2	0	2	14	18	−4	4
20	Denmark	4	1	0	3	16	24	−8	2
21	Great Britain	4	0	0	4	6	44	−38	0

Both Austria and Hungary were promoted to Group B.

8 March	Austria	4-3	Denmark

8 March	Hungary	11-0	Great Britain

9 March	Great Britain	2-21	Austria

9 March	Hungary	6-1	France

10 March	France	7-4	Denmark

11 March	Denmark	7-3	Great Britain

11 March	Austria	6-3	Hungary

12 March	France	5-1	Great Britain

13 March	Hungary	10-2	Denmark

13 March	Austria	7-1	France

== Ranking and statistics ==
1976 IIHF World Championship winners

Czechoslovakia
4th title

=== Tournament Awards ===
- Best players selected by the directorate:
  - Best Goaltender: (Czechoslovakia) Jiří Holeček
  - Best Defenceman: (Czechoslovakia) František Pospíšil
  - Best Forward: (Czechoslovakia) Vladimír Martinec
- Media All-Star Team:
  - Goaltender: (Czechoslovakia) Jiří Holeček
  - Defence: (Czechoslovakia) František Pospíšil, (Sweden) Mats Waltin
  - Forwards: (Soviet Union) Valeri Kharlamov, (Czechoslovakia) Vladimír Martinec, (Czechoslovakia) Milan Nový

=== Final standings ===
The final standings of the tournament according to IIHF:

1st place, gold medalist(s)	Czechoslovakia
2nd place, silver medalist(s)	Soviet Union
3rd place, bronze medalist(s)	Sweden
4	United States
5	Finland
6	West Germany
7	Poland
8	East Germany

=== European championships final standings ===
The final standings of the European championships according to IIHF:

1st place, gold medalist(s)	Czechoslovakia
2nd place, silver medalist(s)	Sweden
3rd place, bronze medalist(s)	Soviet Union
4	West Germany
5	Poland
6	Finland
7	East Germany
