= HC Slovan Bratislava =

Professional ice hockey club based in Bratislava, Slovakia

- Nickname: Belasí (the Sky Blues); Orli (the Eagles)
- City: Bratislava, Slovakia
- League: Slovak Extraliga (1993–2012, 2019–present): Kontinental Hockey League (2012–2019)
- Founded: 1921; 105 years ago
- Home arena: Ondrej Nepela Arena (capacity 10,055)
- Colours: Sky blue, white, dark blue
- Owners: JTRE sports & entertainment a.s. (Peter Korbačka, chairman)
- General manager: Lukáš Havlíček
- Head coach: Brad Tapper
- Captain: Tomáš Marcinko
- Affiliates: HC TEBS Bratislava
- Farm club: Modré Krídla Slovan (disbanded)
- Website: www.hcslovan.sk

Hockey Club Slovan Bratislava (Slovak: Hokejový Klub Slovan Bratislava) is a professional ice hockey club based in Bratislava, Slovakia. In 2012, it left the Slovak Extraliga and joined the international Kontinental Hockey League (KHL). In 2019, it returned to the Tipos Extraliga. The club has won nine Slovak championships (most recently in 2022), one Czechoslovak championship (1979) and one IIHF Continental Cup (2004), making it the second most successful hockey club in Slovak history after their biggest rival HC Košice. The team plays its home games at Ondrej Nepela Arena, also known as Tipos Arena. The team is nicknamed Belasí, which means the "sky blues" in English.

== History ==
The sports club Slovan Bratislava was founded in 1919 as a football club, then called 1.CsSK Bratislava. In 1921, a hockey section was founded as "CsSK hockey". It played its first game in December 1924 against Wiener EV from Vienna, losing 6–1. In 1948, the name of the club was changed to Slovan Bratislava, which has been kept until today.

For many years following World War II, Slovan was the only Slovak representative in the highest Czechoslovak league, and achieved several second-place finishes in the championship. The only title in the Czechoslovak First Ice Hockey League was achieved under coach Ladislav Horsky in the 1978–79 season. Additionally, the youth teams won several championships.

After the separation of Slovakia and the Czech Republic in 1993, Slovan played in the Slovak Extraliga and won eight championship titles over 19 years.

In addition to the success achieved in Slovakia, Slovan also performed well internationally, with three Spengler Cup wins in a row in 1972, 1973 and 1974. It is also one of only four clubs to play all four seasons of the European Hockey League, progressing to the playoff stage each year. Another highlight was winning the IIHF Continental Cup in the 2003–04 season. From 2011 to 2013, Slovan participated in the European Trophy international pre-season tournament.

=== KHL ===
In March 2012, Slovan filed an application to play in the Kontinental Hockey League (KHL). On 21 June 2012, Slovan Bratislava was officially admitted to the KHL, after they fulfilled all necessary conditions. Founded in 1921, they were the oldest KHL team by a large margin, as there were no ice hockey leagues in the former Union of Soviet Socialist Republics prior to 1946.

==== 2012–13 season ====
In May, Slovan signed Rostislav Čada as the new head coach for the first KHL season, who had had a KHL experience from working at Avangard Omsk. After playing two friendly matches against KHL teams and the European Trophy during the summer months, Slovan opened the 2012–13 season with a home game against Ukrainian HC Donbass on 6 September 2012, losing 2–4 in front of a capacity crowd. The first win was achieved 4 days later by defeating Spartak Moscow 2–1 after a shootout. During the NHL lockout between September 2012 and January 2013, the two defenders Ľubomír Višňovský and Andrej Sekera enhanced the team. Slovan ended the season with 78 points as 6th of the Western conference and thus clinched a play-off spot in their first KHL season. In the first play-off round, Slovan played against then-defending champion Dynamo Moscow and lost all four matches.

During the regular season, Slovan had sold out 25 out of its 26 home games with an average attendance of 9,977 spectators, which was the seventh-highest average attendance in Europe that season.

== Stadium ==
HC Slovan Bratislava plays their home games at the Ondrej Nepela Stadium which is also known as Tipos Aréna.

The arena was first opened on 15 December 1940. It was the first artificial ice rink in Bratislava. In 1957, a roof was added and the capacity was 7 000. Before the 1992 Men's Ice Hockey World Championships, the arena was renovated. The interior changed significantly and the capacity was 7 747. The arena was almost entirely rebuilt between 2009 and 2011, because Slovakia hosted the 2011 IIHF World Championship. Further improvements were carried out in 2019 to host the 2019 Men's Ice Hockey World Championships.

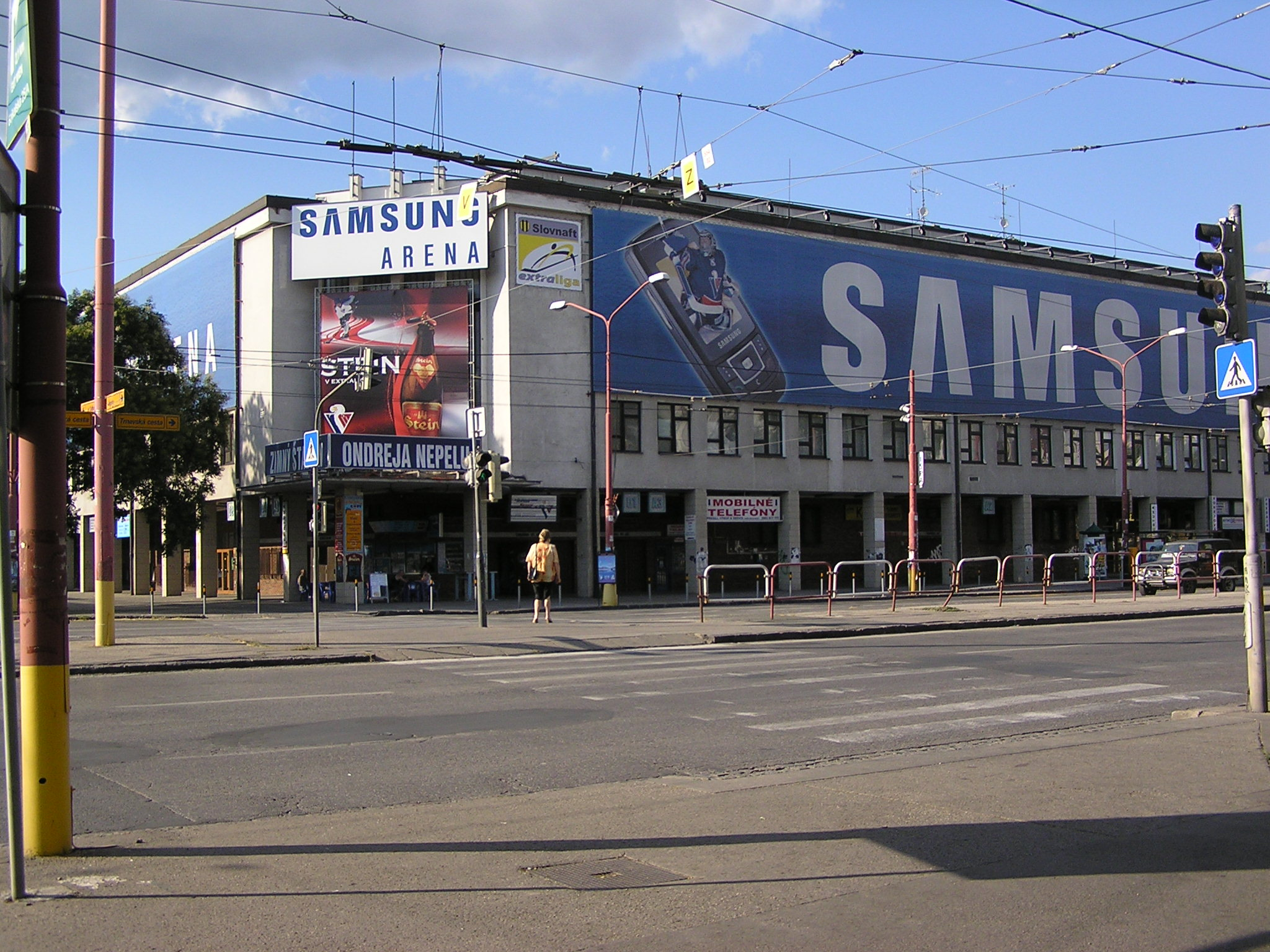
The arena before renovation in 2009 - 2011

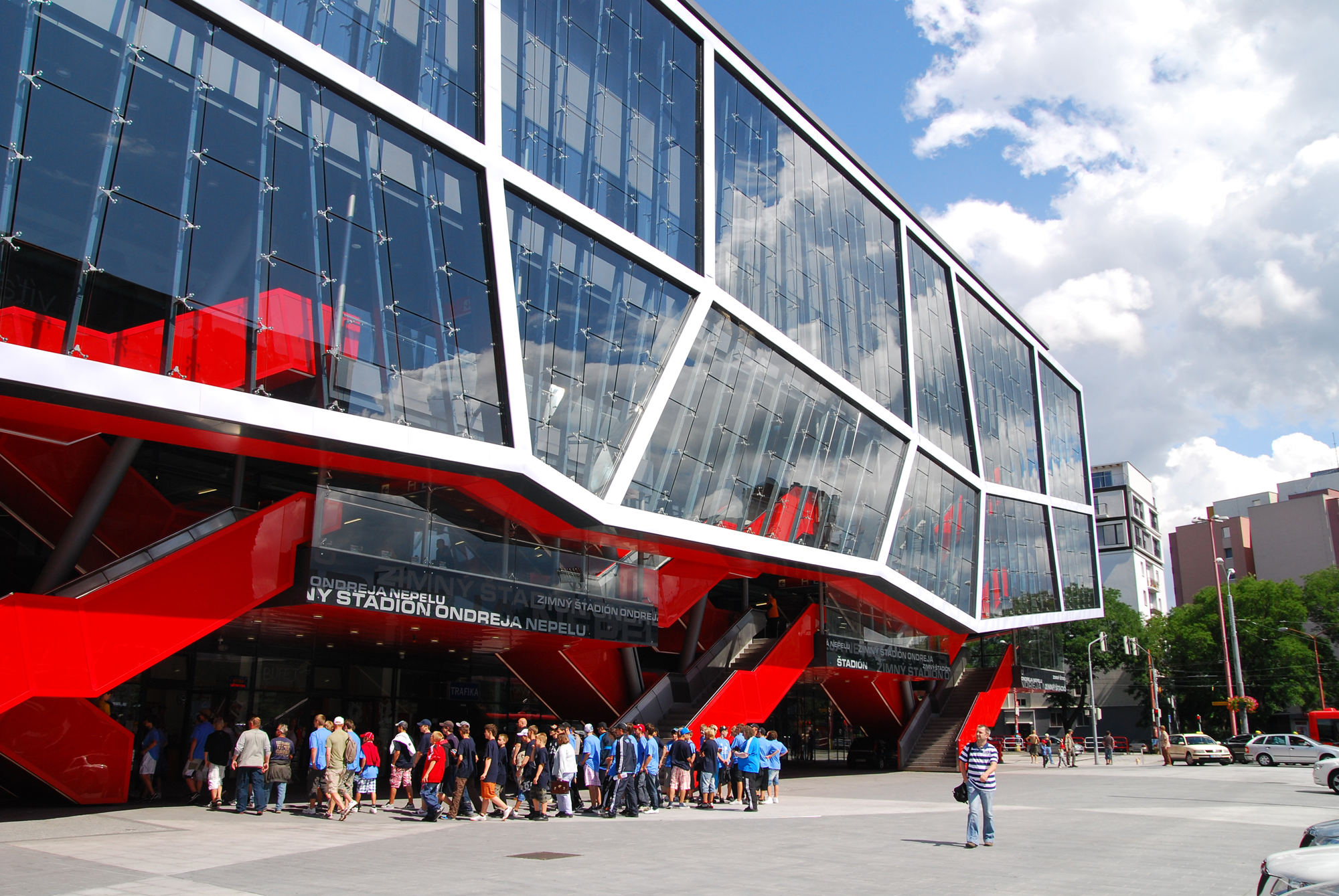
Ondrej Nepela Stadium today

== Mascot ==
Before the start of 2013–14 season, it was announced that the franchise will have a new mascot called Harvy. The mascot's name was determined by fans and its appearance will be of a bald eagle, which is also on HC Slovan's logo.

== Logo ==
The previous HC Slovan Bratislava logo

The rebranding of four leading Bratislava clubs in three sports – ice hockey, basketball, and volleyball – marks the completion of their unification under the new owner, JTRE Sports & Entertainment. This is reflected in a shared name and visual identity. From june 2025, the clubs operated under a single name: Slovan Bratislava

The new visual identity was created by the agency 2:Score, which has extensive experience with sports projects. The agency is behind, for example, the rebranding of football club Sparta Prague and ice hockey club Kometa Brno, the anniversary season of FC Hradec Králové, as well as a long-term partnership with the Chance League – the top Czech football competition, which launched its biggest branding campaign, Fenomén, this summer.

== Support ==
The main ultras group is called Ultras Slovan. There are also smaller groups like Jokers Slovan. Slovan supporters maintain friendly relations with fans of HC Kometa Brno.

During Slovan's participation in the KHL, Tipos arena had one of the highest average attendances in Europe, around 9,900 spectators per match.

=== Rivalries ===
While competing in the Slovak Extraliga, Slovan's main rival is HK Nitra. Slovan also has smaller rivalries with HC Košice and HK Dukla Trenčín.

Slovan's main rival in the Czechoslovak First Ice Hockey League was HK Dukla Trenčín.

In Slovan's first two seasons in the KHL, its biggest rival was Lev Prague. The rivalry started when, in their first game, HC Lev's Zdeno Chára body-checked Slovan's team captain Miroslav Šatan, after which Šatan was out of the lineup for the rest of the season. The fairness of this hit was the centre of many discussions. The games between Slovan and Lev were among the most anticipated of the season for both teams. However, Lev Praha folded after the 2013–14 season.

== Season-by-season record ==
This is a partial list of the last eleven seasons completed by HC Slovan Bratislava. For the full season-by-season history, see List of HC Slovan Bratislava seasons.

Note: GP = Games played, W = Wins, OTW = Overtime/shootout wins, OTL = Overtime/shootout losses, L = Losses, Pts = Points, GF = Goals for, GA = Goals against

Season	GP	W	OTW	OTL	L	Pts	GF	GA	Finish	Playoffs
2014–15	60	15	5	8	32	63	136	188	7th, Bobrov	did not qualify
2015–16	60	21	11	4	24	89	154	148	3rd, Bobrov	Lost in Conference Quarterfinals, 0–4 (CSKA Moscow)
2016–17	60	22	7	5	26	85	144	166	4th, Bobrov	did not qualify
2017–18	56	15	3	7	31	58	119	187	5th, Bobrov	did not qualify
2018–19	62	10	5	3	44	33	101	213	6th, Tarasov	did not qualify
2019–20	55	29	8	5	13	108	191	118	2nd, Extraliga	Not held due to the coronavirus pandemic
2020–21	50	26	6	4	14	94	146	115	4th, Extraliga	Lost in Semifinals, 1–4 (HKM Zvolen)
2021–22	50	32	3	5	10	104	189	118	1st, Extraliga	Slovak Extraliga Champions, 4–2 (HK Nitra)
2022–23	50	27	3	6	14	93	162	115	2nd, Extraliga	Lost in Quarterfinals, 2–4 (Dukla Michalovce)
2023–24	50	21	5	4	20	77	157	160	5th, Extraliga	Lost in Quarterfinals, 0–4 (Košice)
2024–25	54	21	5	8	20	81	164	159	7th, Extraliga	Lost in Wild card round, 1–3 (Zvolen)

== Honours ==
=== Domestic ===
- Slovak Extraliga
  - (gold) Winners (9): 1997–98, 1999–2000, 2001–02, 2002–03, 2004–05, 2006–07, 2007–08, 2011–12, 2021–22
  - (silver) Runners-up (2): 1998–99, 2009–10, 2025-2026
  - (bronze) 3rd place (5): 1994–95, 1995–96, 2000–01, 2003–04, 2008–09
- Czechoslovak Extraliga
  - (gold) Winners (1): 1978–79
  - (silver) Runners-up (8): 1948–49, 1959–60, 1960–61, 1961–62, 1963–64, 1964–65, 1969–70, 1971–72
  - (bronze) 3rd place (9): 1945–46, 1946–47, 1947–48, 1962–63, 1965–66, 1968–69, 1970–71, 1972–73, 1979–80
- Slovak Hockey League
  - (gold) Winners (2): 1940–41, 1941–42
  - (silver) Runners-up (2): 1942–43, 1943–44
- 1st. Slovak National Hockey League
  - (gold) Winners (2): 1981–82, 1989–90
- 2nd. Czechoslovak Hockey League
  - (silver) Runners-up (1): 1954–55

=== International ===
- IIHF European Cup
  - (bronze) 3rd place (1): 1979–80
- IIHF Continental Cup
  - (gold) Winners (1): 2003–04
  - (bronze) 3rd place (1): 2000–01
- IIHF Champions Hockey League
  - Groupe Stage (2): 2021–22, 2022–23

=== Pre-season ===
- Spengler Cup
  - (gold) Winners (3): 1972, 1973, 1974
- Tatra Cup
  - (gold) Winners (5): 1974, 1975, 1990, 1997, 1998
- Rona Cup
  - (gold) Winners (1): 1998

== Players ==
=== Current roster ===
As of 24 November 2024

No.	Nat	Player	Pos	S/G	Age	Acquired	Birthplace
14	(United States)	Sena Acolatse	D	R	35	2024	Hayward, California, United States
87	(Sweden)	Jonas Ahnelöv	D	L	38	2023	Huddinge Municipality, Sweden
65	(Slovakia)	Patrik Andrisík	G	L	23	2024	Ilava, Slovakia
5	(Slovakia)	Patrik Bačík	D	L	31	2024	Bratislava, Slovakia
83	(Slovakia)	Martin Bakoš	LW	R	36	2024	Spišská Nová Ves, Czechoslovakia
74	(Slovakia)	Boris Brincko	D	L	27	2024	Poprad, Slovakia
71	(Slovakia)	Tomas Dudas	C	L	22	2023	Žilina, Slovakia
30	(Slovakia)	Denis Godla	G	L	31	2023	Kežmarok, Slovakia
98	(Slovakia)	Andrej Golian	D	L	25	2021	Banská Bystrica, Slovakia
44	(Canada)	Mitchell Hoelscher	C	L	26	2024	Waterloo, Ontario, Canada
31	(Finland)	Henri Kiviaho	G	L	32	2024	Lappeenranta, Finland
82	(Slovakia)	Tomas Kralovic	D	R	21	2024	Bratislava, Slovakia
77	(Slovakia)	Branislav Kubka	D	R	38	2023	Detva, Czechoslovakia
16	(Slovakia)	Roman Kukumberg	LW	L	21	2022	Bratislava, Slovakia
70	(Slovakia)	Adam Lukošík	C	L	24	2020	Prešov, Slovakia
43	(Slovakia)	Patrik Maier	D	L	29	2020	Bratislava, Slovakia
20	(Slovakia)	Jakub Minárik	C	L	26	2022	Topoľčany, Slovakia
88	(United States)	Austin Ortega	RW	R	32	2024	Escondido, California, United States
28	(Slovakia)	Richard Pánik	RW	L	35	2024	Martin, Czechoslovakia
39	(United States)	Liam Pecararo (A)	LW	L	30	2022	Canton, Massachusetts, United States
72	(Russia)	Vadim Pereskokov	C	L	33	2024	Oral, Kazakhstan
95	(Czech Republic)	Jonáš Peterek	C	R	25	2024	Havířov, Czech Republic
63	(Slovakia)	Miroslav Preisinger	C	L	35	2021	Bratislava, Czechoslovakia
25	(Slovakia)	Radovan Puliš	RW	L	35	2024	Hliník nad Hronom, Czechoslovakia
8	(Slovakia)	Michal Sersen (C)	D	L	40	2012	Gelnica, Czechoslovakia
49	(Slovakia)	Samuel Takáč (A)	LW	L	34	2021	Poprad, Czechoslovakia
11	(Canada)	Josh Lawrence	C	L	24	2026	Fredericton, Canada

=== Franchise scoring leaders ===
These are the top-ten-point-scorers in franchise history. Figures are updated after each completed season.

- * – current Slovan player

Note: Pos = Position; GP = Games played; G = Goals; A = Assists; Pts = Points; P/G = Points per game

Points
Player	Pos	GP	G	A	Pts	P/G
(Slovakia) Richard Kapuš	C	583	194	305	499	0.86
(Czechoslovakia) Václav Nedomanský	C	327	277	157	434	1.33
(Slovakia) Zdeno Cíger	LW	321	146	234	380	1.18
(Slovakia) Martin Kuľha	RW	420	187	184	371	0.88
(Slovakia) Ján Lipiansky	C	429	180	179	359	0.84
(Slovakia) Marián Šťastný	RW	225	204	153	357	1.59
(Slovakia) Martin Hujsa	LW	354	153	195	348	0.98
(Slovakia) Ján Jaško	LW	402	193	153	346	0.86
(Slovakia) Dárius Rusnák	F	314	170	164	334	1.06
(Slovakia) Dušan Pašek	C	327	174	132	306	0.94

Goals
Player	Pos	G
(Czechoslovakia) Václav Nedomanský	C	277
(Slovakia) Marián Šťastný	RW	204
(Slovakia) Richard Kapuš	C	194
(Slovakia) Ján Jaško	LW	193
(Slovakia) Martin Kuľha	RW	187
(Slovakia) Ján Lipiansky	C	180
(Slovakia) Dušan Pašek	C	174
(Slovakia) Dárius Rusnák	F	170
(Slovakia) Ivan Dornič	RW	159
(Slovakia) Martin Hujsa	LW	153

Assists
Player	Pos	A
(Slovakia) Richard Kapuš	C	305
(Slovakia) Zdeno Cíger	LW	234
(Slovakia) Martin Hujsa	LW	195
(Slovakia) Martin Kuľha	RW	184
(Slovakia) Ján Lipiansky	C	179
(Czech Republic) Petr Pavlas	D	175
(Slovakia) Dárius Rusnák	F	164
(Czechoslovakia) Václav Nedomanský	C	157
(Slovakia) Marián Šťastný	RW	153
(Slovakia) Ján Jaško	LW	153

== Staff ==
=== Head coaches ===
These are the head coaches of HC Slovan Bratislava since they joined the Czechoslovak Extraliga:

- Josef Maleček 1945 – 1948
- Michal Polóni 1948 – 1952
- Zdeněk Bláha 1952 – 1955
- Jiří Anton 1955 – 1957
- Michal Polóni 1957 – 1958
- Ladislav Horský 1958 – 1963
- Rastislav Jančuška 1963 – 1966
- Ladislav Horský 1966 – 1968
- Ján Starší 1968 – 1972
- Karol Fako 1972/73
- Ján Starší 1972 – 1974
- Juraj Mitošinka 1974 – 1976
- Ladislav Horský 1976 – 1981
- Jaroslav Walter 1981 – 1982/83
- Július Haas 1982/83
- Břetislav Guryča 1983/84
- Július Haas 1984/85
- Jozef Golonka 1985 – 1987/88
- Július Haas 1987/88
- R.Tománek 1988/89
- Július Haas 1988/89
- Ján Filc 1989/90
- Jaroslav Walter 1990 – 1992
- Dušan Žiška 1992 – 1997
- Ernest Bokroš 1996 – 1999/00
- František Hossa 1999/00 – 2001
- Miloš Říha 2001/02
- Július Šupler 2002/03
- Ľubomír Pokovič 2003/04
- Miloš Říha 2004/05
- Ján Jaško 2005/06
- Rostislav Čada 2006/07
- Zdeno Cíger 2006/07 – 2008/09
- Antonín Stavjaňa 2008/09 – 2010
- Pavel Hynek 2010/11
- Zdeno Cíger 2010/11
- Štefan Mikeš 2011/12
- Jan Neliba 2011/12
- Rostislav Čada 2012 – 2014
- Miloš Říha 2015 – 2017
- Vladimír Országh 2018
- Roman Stantien 2019 – 2021
- Róbert Döme 2021 – 2022
- Andrej Podkonický 2022 - 2023
- Ján Pardavý 2023 - 2024
- Peter Oremus 2024 - 2025
- Brad Tapper 2025 - 2029?

== Hall of Fame ==
The following players associated with HC Slovan Bratislava have been inducted in various Halls of Fame:

=== Hockey Hall of Fame ===
Hockey Hall of Fame is located in Toronto, Ontario, Canada.

Name	Category	Inducted
(Slovakia) Peter Šťastný	Player	1998

=== IIHF Hall of Fame ===
The IIHF Hall of Fame is intended to honor individuals who have made valuable contributions both internationally and in their home countries.

Name	Category	Inducted
(Czech Republic) Václav Nedomanský	Player	1997
(Slovakia) Vladimír Dzurilla	Player	1998
(Slovakia) Jozef Golonka	Player	1998
(Slovakia) Ján Starší	Builder	1999
(Slovakia) Peter Šťastný	Player	2000

Preceded by Poldi Kladno	Czechoslovak Extraliga; Champions; 1978–79	Succeeded by Poldi Kladno
Preceded by Dukla Trenčín	Slovak Extraliga; Champions; 1997–98	Succeeded by HC Košice
Preceded by HC Košice	Slovak Extraliga; Champions; 1999–00	Succeeded by HKm Zvolen
Preceded by HKm Zvolen	Slovak Extraliga; Champions; 2001–02	Succeeded by HC Slovan Bratislava
Preceded by HC Slovan Bratislava	Slovak Extraliga; Champions; 2002–03	Succeeded by Dukla Trenčín
Preceded by Dukla Trenčín	Slovak Extraliga; Champions; 2004–05	Succeeded by MsHK Žilina
Preceded by MsHK Žilina	Slovak Extraliga; Champions; 2006–07	Succeeded by HC Slovan Bratislava
Preceded by HC Slovan Bratislava	Slovak Extraliga; Champions; 2007–08	Succeeded by HC Košice
Preceded by HC Košice	Slovak Extraliga; Champions; 2011–12	Succeeded by HKM Zvolen
Preceded by HKM Zvolen	Slovak Extraliga; Champions; 2021–22	Succeeded by HC Košice
