= 1994–95 Slovak 1. Liga season =

Slovak ice hockey league season

The 1994–95 Slovak 1.Liga season was the second season of the Slovak 1. Liga, the second level of ice hockey in Slovakia. 12 teams participated in the league, and SK Iskra Banska Bystrica won the championship.

== Standings ==
	Club	GP	W	T	L	Goals	Pts
1.	ŠK Iskra Banská Bystrica	44	31	6	7	218:78	68
2.	HKm Zvolen	44	27	8	9	184:117	62
3.	HK 36 Skalica	44	27	6	11	195:106	60
4.	HC VTJ Michalovce	44	19	11	14	163:136	49
5.	VTJ Dukla Senica	44	21	3	20	187:184	45
6.	HKP Žilina	44	18	8	18	167:177	44
7.	HK 31 Kežmarok	44	17	6	21	129:154	40
8.	ŠK Matador Púchov	44	15	10	19	146:174	40
9.	HC VTJ Topoľčany	44	15	5	24	133:179	35
10.	HK VTJ Piešťany	44	13	7	24	122:205	33
11.	HK PPS Detva	44	8	10	26	116:207	26
12.	HK Levoča	44	10	6	28	118:161	26
