= HC MONACObet Banská Bystrica =

- Nickname: Barani (Rams)
- City: Banská Bystrica, Slovakia
- League: Slovak Extraliga
- Founded: 1922 as Slávia
- Home arena: Banská Bystrica Ice Stadium (capacity 3,016)
- Colours: Red, white, black
- President: Vladimír Tropp
- General manager: Ľuboš Pisár
- Head coach: Vlastimil Wojnar
- Website: www.hc05.sk

HC '05 Banská Bystrica, known as HC MONACObet Banská Bystrica since the 2024–25 season for sponsorship reasons, is a professional Slovak ice hockey club based in Banská Bystrica, Slovakia. They are three-time winners of the Slovak Extraliga and they have won the second-tier Slovak 1. Liga four times. The team is nicknamed Barani, which means Rams in English.

== History ==
=== Czechoslovak era ===
HC '05 Banská Bystrica was founded in 2005 but professional hockey in Banská Bystrica was playing long before. The previous club was established in 1922. The club was named Slávia but later changed name several times. In 1962, the club was named Iskra (Spark in English) and this name kept up until 2005. In interwar period and during the World War II, the club played in the Slovak League. Their best placement was second in 1930, 1931, and 1934. They were members of the first postwar Czechoslovak Extraliga season. In the 1945–46 season, they finished 6th in Group A and were relegated from the Top level. Banská Bystrica returned to the Extraliga in the 1947–48 season but they finished 6th in Group A and were relegated again. This season was their last at the Top level until the 1995–96 Slovak Extraliga season. Since 1963–64, Iskra played in the 1. SNHL (1st Slovak National Hockey League), the second level in Czechoslovak hockey. They were members of all seasons of the 1. SNHL since its introduction in 1963 until dissolution of league in 1993. Iskra won the 1. SNHL in the 1968–69 season and qualified for the preliminary round of the Czechoslovak Extraliga. They lost 5 of 6 games in the preliminary round against Škoda Plzeň, VŽKG Ostrava, and Mladá Boleslav and were not promoted to the Extraliga.

=== Slovak era ===
After dissolution of Czechoslovakia in 1993, the club was included to the Slovak 1.Liga, the second level in Slovak hockey. In their first season, they finished second. In the next season, Iskra won the 1. Liga and was promoted to the Slovak Extraliga. Iskra placed ninth in the 1995–96 season and they had to play the relegation round. Iskra saved the Extraliga for the 1996–97 season but this season was less productive and they were relegated from the Top level. They returned in the 1998–99 season but were relegated again, by missing the cut by three points. In 2005, the club was transformed to an incorporated company and renamed to HC '05. They were promoted to the Extraliga in the 2007–08 season after their victory in the playoffs finals against HK Spišská Nová Ves. In the 2010–11 season, they finished third in the regular season, defeated their big rival HKm Zvolen in the quarterfinals, and lost 3–4 against HK Poprad in the semifinals. This season was their most successful since their 1. SNHL victory in 1969.

== Honours ==
=== Domestic ===
Slovak Extraliga

- (gold) Winners (3): 2016–17, 2017–18, 2018–19
- (silver) Runners-up (2): 2014–15, 2015–16
- (bronze) 3rd place (2): 2010–11, 2013–14

Slovak 1. Liga

- (gold) Winners (4): 1994–95, 1997–98, 2005–06, 2007–08
- (silver) Runners-up (2): 1993–94, 1999–2000
- (bronze) 3rd place (1): 2006–07

Slovak Hockey League

- (silver) Runners-up (1): 1938–39
- (bronze) 3rd place (1): 1939–40

1st. Slovak National Hockey League

- (gold) Winners (1): 1968–69
- (silver) Runners-up (3): 1965–66, 1975–76, 1986–87
- (bronze) 3rd place (2): 1981–82, 1990–91

=== Pre-season ===
Tatra Cup

- (gold) Winners (1): 2022

== Players ==
=== Current roster ===
As of 25 November 2024.

No.	Nat	Player	Pos	S/G	Age	Acquired	Birthplace
8	(United States)	Collin Adams	LW	L	27	2024	Brighton, Michigan, United States
18	(Slovakia)	Andrej Bíreš	LW	R	32	2022	Banská Bystrica, Slovakia
91	(Canada)	Matthew Boucher	LW	L	28	2024	Los Angeles, California, United States
54	(Slovakia)	Boris Česánek	D	L	25	2024	Kežmarok, Slovakia
4	(Canada)	Gabriel Chicoine	D	L	29	2024	Saint-Dominique, Quebec, Canada
9	(Slovakia)	Roman Faith	LW	L	23	2023	Košice, Slovakia
40	(Slovakia)	Rastislav Gašpar	C	R	31	2022	Banská Bystrica, Slovakia
49	(Czech Republic)	Dominik Hrachovina	G	L	31	2024	Brno, Czech Republic
81	(Slovakia)	Michal Jasenec	RW	L	24	2024	Bratislava, Slovakia
72	(Slovakia)	Lukáš Kozák	D	L	34	2024	Martin, Czechoslovakia
–	(United States)	Andrew Lucas	D	R	27	2025	Alexandria, Virginia
75	(Slovakia)	Christián Michalčin	D	R	29	2024	Košice, Slovakia
21	(Slovakia)	Tomáš Matoušek (A)	RW	L	33	2023	Banská Bystrica, Czechoslovakia
44	(Slovakia)	Ján Petriska	RW	R	24	2023	Bojnice, Slovakia
88	(Slovakia)	Eugen Rabčan	G	R	24	2023	Levoča, Slovakia
24	(Canada)	Reece Scarlett	D	R	33	2024	Edmonton, Alberta, Canada
22	(Slovakia)	Dávid Šoltés	LW	R	31	2024	Košice, Slovakia
23	(Slovakia)	Luka Tomka	F	L	19	2024	Lučenec, Slovakia
92	(Slovakia)	Adrian Valigura	LW	L	25	2024	Poprad, Slovakia
19	(Canada)	Alex-Olivier Voyer	RW	R	27	2024	Sherbrooke, Quebec, Canada
67	(Canada)	Matthew Wedman	C	L	26	2024	Edmonton, Alberta, Canada
84	(Slovakia)	Vojtech Zeleňák (A)	D	L	27	2024	Košice, Slovakia
6	(Slovakia)	Boris Žabka	D	L	21	2023	Bratislava, Slovakia

== NHL alumni ==
- (Slovakia) Ivan Majeský (1999, 2015–2017)
- (Slovakia) Vladimír Mihálik (2016–2020)
- (Slovakia) Vladimír Országh (1996, 2009–2010)
- (Slovakia) Michal Handzuš (1994–1996, 2014–2017)
- (Slovakia) Tomáš Surový (1998–2000, 2016–2019)
- (Canada) Clayton Stoner (2012–2013)
- (Slovakia) Richard Zedník (1992–1994, 2010–2011)
- (Slovakia) Jozef Čierny (2005–2006)
- (United States) Jason Bacashihua (2015–2017)
- (United States) Colby Cohen (2014–2015)
- (Czech Republic) Zdeněk Nedvěd (2009–2010)
- (Canada) Nathan Lawson (2016–2017)
- (Canada) Tanner Glass (2012–2013)
- (Canada) Theo Peckham (2014–2015)
- (Canada) Dana Tyrell (2012–2013)
- (Canada) Akim Aliu (2017)
- (Canada) Colton Gillies (2015–2016)
- (Canada) Ty Wishart (2016–2017)
- (Canada) Mike Danton (2012–2013)
- (Canada) Eric Selleck (2018–2019)

Preceded by HK Nitra	Slovak Extraliga; Champions; 2016–17	Succeeded by HC '05 Banská Bystrica
Preceded by HC '05 Banská Bystrica	Slovak Extraliga; Champions; 2017–18	Succeeded by HC '05 Banská Bystrica
Preceded by HC '05 Banská Bystrica	Slovak Extraliga; Champions; 2018–19	Succeeded by No competition (Note: No playoffs due to the COVID-19 pandemic in Slovakia.)
