= 1963–64 Czechoslovak Extraliga season =

Czechoslovak ice hockey season

The 1963–64 Czechoslovak Extraliga season was the 21st season of the Czechoslovak Extraliga, the top level of ice hockey in Czechoslovakia. 12 teams participated in the league, and ZKL Brno won the championship.

== First round ==
Pl.	Team	GP	W	T	L	GF–GA	Pts
1.	ZKL Brno	22	20	0	2	169:54	40
2.	TJ SONP Kladno	22	17	0	5	134:82	34
3.	Slovan CHZJD Bratislava	22	13	4	5	101:66	30
4.	Spartak Praha Sokolovo	22	13	2	7	111:75	28
5.	Tesla Pardubice	22	11	3	8	118:88	25
6.	Dukla Jihlava	22	10	3	9	96:75	23
7.	TJ Spartak LZ Plzeň	22	6	5	11	85:95	19
8.	VŽKG Ostrava	22	8	3	11	78:96	19
9.	CHZ Litvínov	22	8	3	11	73:94	19
10.	Dukla Litoměřice	22	5	2	15	61:151	12
11.	TJ Gottwaldov	22	4	2	16	73:138	10
12.	VTŽ Chomutov	22	2	2	18	67:162	6

== Final round ==
Pl.	Team	GP	W	T	L	GF–GA	Pts
1.	ZKL Brno	32	29	0	3	232:77	58
2.	Slovan CHZJD Bratislava	32	18	5	9	138:105	41
3.	Dukla Jihlava	32	18	3	11	139:98	39
4.	TJ SONP Kladno	32	18	1	13	175:147	37
5.	Tesla Pardubice	32	14	5	13	157:141	33
6.	Spartak Praha Sokolovo	32	13	5	14	139:123	31

== 7th–12th place ==
Pl.	Team	GP	W	T	L	GF–GA	Pts
7.	VŽKG Ostrava	32	13	3	16	126:141	29
8.	CHZ Litvínov	32	11	6	15	110:128	28
9.	TJ Spartak LZ Plzeň	32	10	7	15	121:141	27
10.	TJ Gottwaldov	32	11	3	18	117:167	25
11.	Dukla Litoměřice	32	10	4	18	110:185	24
12.	VTŽ Chomutov	32	3	4	25	104:225	10

== 1. Liga-Qualification ==
Place	Team	Pts
1.	TJ Dukla Košice	8
2.	Motorlet Prag	7
3.	Královopolská Brno	7
4.	Slavoj České Budějovice	2
