= Vladimír Országh =

Slovak ice hockey player and coach

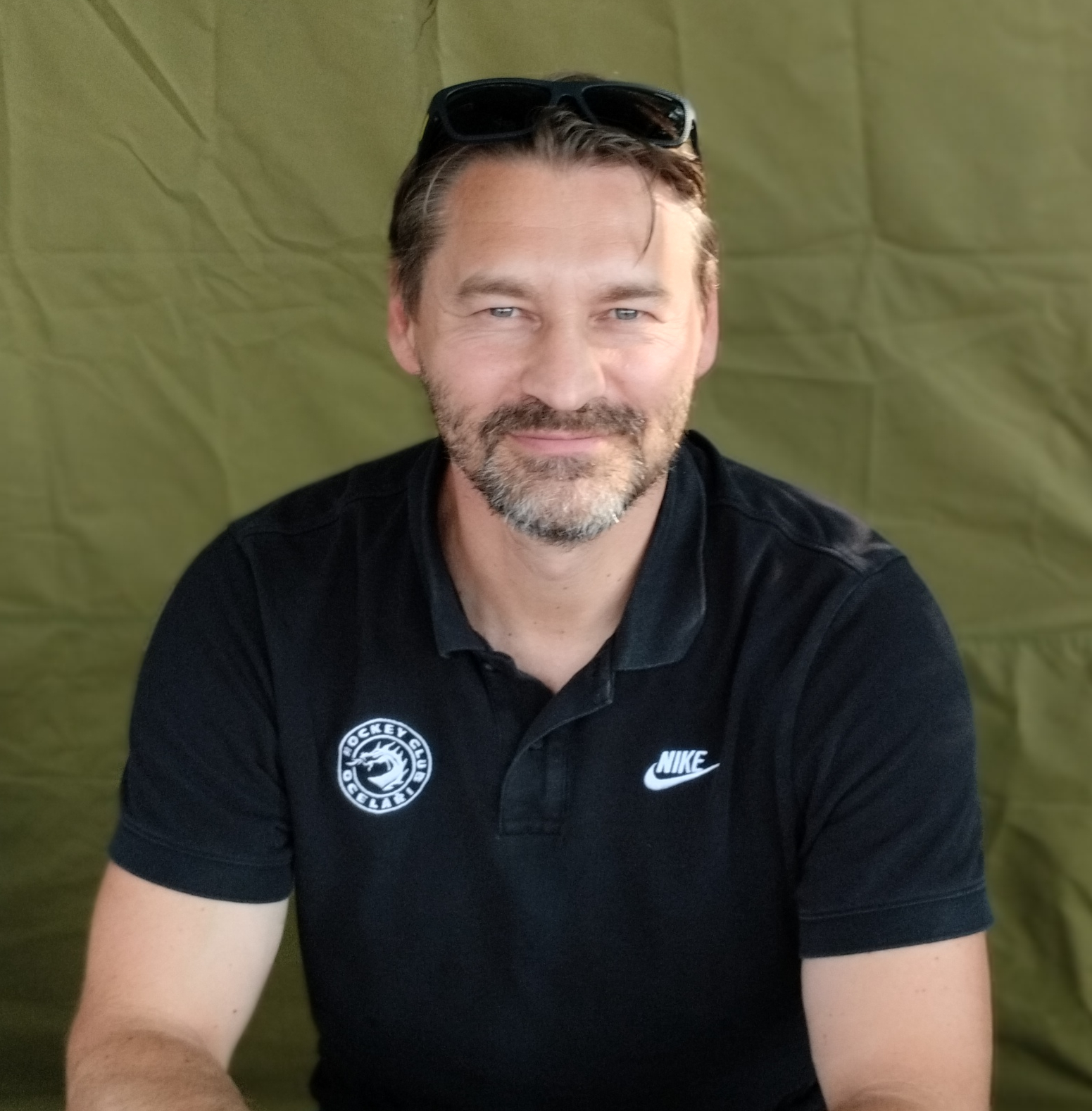
- Vladimír Országh (2023)
- Born: May 24, 1977 (age 48) Banská Bystrica, Czechoslovakia
- Height: 5 ft 11 in (180 cm)
- Weight: 193 lb (88 kg; 13 st 11 lb)
- Position: Right wing
- Shot: Left
- Played for: NHL; New York Islanders; Nashville Predators; St. Louis Blues; AHL; Lowell Lock Monsters; SEL; Djurgårdens IF; Luleå HF; Slovak; HKm Zvolen
- National team: Slovakia
- NHL draft: 106th overall, 1995; New York Islanders
- Playing career: 1996–2007

Vladimír Országh (born May 24, 1977) is a Slovak former professional ice hockey player. Now he is the head coach of the Slovak national team.

== Playing career ==
As a youth, Országh played in the 1991 Quebec International Pee-Wee Hockey Tournament with a team from Poprad.

Országh was drafted into the National Hockey League (NHL) in 1995 by the New York Islanders in the fifth round (106th overall), and he has been playing in the NHL since 1997. From 1997 through to 2000, Vladimír Országh was attempting to crack the New York Islanders line-up, as he had a stint of 34 games in the NHL over those three years, tallying a total of five points (3 goals and 2 assists). After becoming an unrestricted free agent after the 1999–2000 NHL season, Országh signed a contract with the Djurgårdens IF hockey team of the Swedish Elitserien, based in Stockholm. In Sweden, he had a breakthrough season, scoring 23 goals and making 13 assists, for a combined total of 36 points. The scouts of the Nashville Predators of the NHL noticed Országh's solid performance and signed him as a free agent the following season. In his time with the Predators, he has tallied 105 points (47 goals and 58 assists), and he has also helped them earn their first playoff spot in the team's six-year history. Throughout his six years of NHL experience, Országh wore the number 33 jersey and has played both the left wing and the right wing positions. On December 30, 2005, Országh joined the St. Louis Blues after he was claimed off waivers. Orszagh missed the entire 2006–2007 season due to a knee injury.

Medal record

Representing Slovakia

Ice hockey

World Championships
Gold medal – first place	2002 Sweden	
Bronze medal – third place	2003 Finland	

== Career statistics ==
=== Regular season and playoffs ===
			Regular season					Playoffs
Season	Team	League	GP	G	A	Pts	PIM	GP	G	A	Pts	PIM
1993–94	ŠK Iskra Banská Bystrica	SVK U20	38	38	27	65	—	—	—	—	—	—
1994–95	ŠK Iskra Banská Bystrica	SVK.2	38	18	12	30	—	—	—	—	—	—
1995–96	ŠK Iskra Banská Bystrica	SVK	31	9	5	14	22	—	—	—	—	—
1996–97	Utah Grizzlies	IHL	68	12	15	27	30	3	0	1	1	4
1997–98	Utah Grizzlies	IHL	62	13	10	23	60	4	2	0	2	0
1997–98	New York Islanders	NHL	11	0	1	1	2	—	—	—	—	—
1998–99	Lowell Lock Monsters	AHL	68	18	23	41	57	3	2	2	4	2
1998–99	New York Islanders	NHL	12	1	0	1	6	—	—	—	—	—
1999–2000	Lowell Lock Monsters	AHL	55	8	12	20	22	7	3	3	6	2
1999–2000	New York Islanders	NHL	12	2	1	3	4	—	—	—	—	—
2000–01	Djurgårdens IF	SEL	50	23	13	36	62	16	7	3	10	20
2001–02	Nashville Predators	NHL	79	15	21	36	56	—	—	—	—	—
2002–03	Nashville Predators	NHL	78	16	16	32	38	—	—	—	—	—
2003–04	Nashville Predators	NHL	82	16	21	37	74	6	2	0	2	4
2004–05	HKm Zvolen	SVK	37	16	14	30	50	17	5	2	7	24
2004–05	ŠaHK Iskra Banská Bystrica	SVK.2	2	2	0	2	4	—	—	—	—	—
2005–06	Luleå HF	SEL	19	8	5	13	42	—	—	—	—	—
2005–06	St. Louis Blues	NHL	16	4	5	9	14	—	—	—	—	—
IHL totals			130	25	25	50	90	7	2	1	3	4
NHL totals			289	54	65	119	194	6	2	0	2	4
AHL totals			123	26	35	61	79	10	5	5	10	4

=== International ===
Year	Team	Event	GP	G	A	Pts	PIM
1995	Slovakia	WJC B	7	1	2	3	8
1996	Slovakia	WJC	6	5	1	6	18
2001	Slovakia	WC	7	2	5	7	6
2002	Slovakia	WC	9	3	1	4	12
2003	Slovakia	WC	9	2	1	3	14
2004	Slovakia	WC	9	0	2	2	8
2004	Slovakia	WCH	4	0	0	0	6
2005	Slovakia	WC	5	0	1	1	0
Senior totals			43	7	10	17	46
