= Miloš Říha =

Czechoslovak ice hockey player (1958–2020)

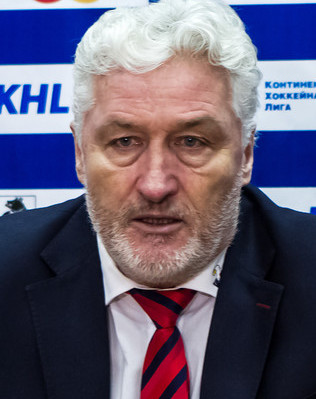
- Born: 6 December 1958; Přerov, Czechoslovakia
- Died: 31 August 2020 (aged 61); Prague, Czech Republic
- Height: 1.89 m (6 ft 2 in)
- Weight: 89 kg (196 lb; 14 st 0 lb)
- Position: Forward
- Shot: Left
- Played for: HC ZUBR Přerov; HC Dukla Jihlava; HC Vítkovice Ridera; PSG Berani Zlín; HC Kometa Brno; SHK Hodonin
- NHL draft: 196th overall, 1983; Minnesota North Stars
- Playing career: 1976–1991

Miloš Říha (6 December 1958 – 31 August 2020) was a Czech ice hockey player and coach, who coached the Czech national team at the 2019 IIHF World Championship.
