= Mieczysław Jaskierski =

Polish ice hockey player

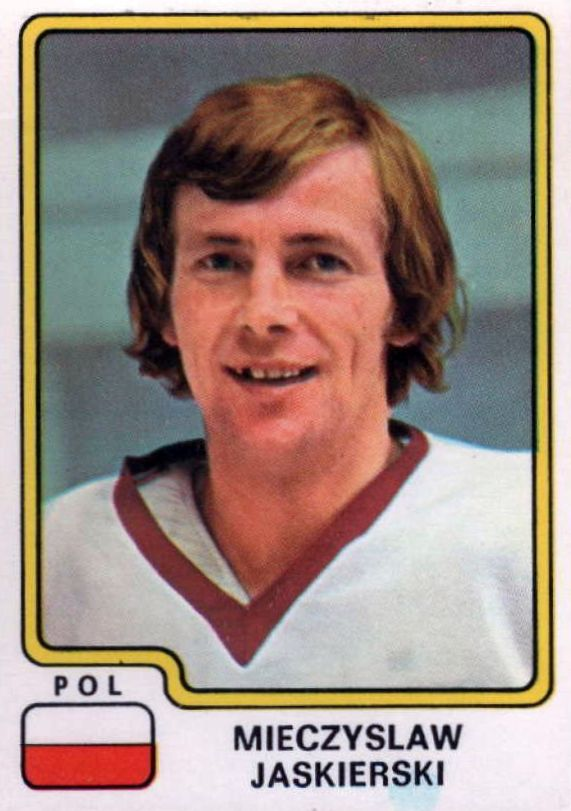
- Born: December 17, 1950 (age 74); Nowy Targ, Poland
- Height: 5 ft 10 in (178 cm)
- Weight: 170 lb (77 kg; 12 st 2 lb)
- Position: Right wing
- Played for: Podhale Nowy Targ
- National team: Poland
- NHL draft: Undrafted
- Playing career: ?–?

Mieczysław Stanisław Jaskierski (born December 17, 1950) is a retired Polish ice hockey player. He played for the Poland men's national ice hockey team at the 1976 Winter Olympics in Innsbruck.
