= 1968–69 Czechoslovak Extraliga season =

Czechoslovak Hockey League Season

The 1968–69 Czechoslovak Extraliga season was the 26th season of the Czechoslovak Extraliga, the top level of ice hockey in Czechoslovakia. 10 teams participated in the league, and Dukla Jihlava won the championship.

== Regular season ==
Pl.	Team	GP	W	T	L	GF–GA	Pts
1.	ASD Dukla Jihlava	36	29	1	6	206:83	59
2.	ZKL Brno	36	26	2	8	184:121	54
3.	Slovan CHZJD Bratislava	36	22	5	9	147:115	49
4.	Tesla Pardubice	36	17	3	16	150:137	37
5.	SONP Kladno	36	15	6	15	115:121	36
6.	Sparta ČKD Praha	36	14	5	17	147:129	33
7.	VSŽ Košice	36	13	4	19	111:146	30
8.	CHZ Litvínov	36	10	5	21	111:164	25
9.	TJ Gottwaldov	36	12	0	24	109:181	24
10.	Motor České Budějovice	36	5	3	28	103:186	13

== 1. Liga-Qualification ==
Pl.	Team	GP	W	T	L	GF–GA	Pts
1.	Škoda Plzeň	6	5	0	1	33:12	10
2.	TJ VŽKG Ostrava	6	4	1	1	26:16	9
3.	Auto Škoda Boleslav	6	1	1	4	21:34	3
4.	Iskra Smrečina Banská Bystrica	6	1	0	5	16:34	2
