= 1972–73 Czechoslovak Extraliga season =

Czechoslovak ice hockey season

The 1972–73 Czechoslovak Extraliga season was the 30th season of the Czechoslovak Extraliga, the top level of ice hockey in Czechoslovakia. 10 teams participated in the league, and Tesla Pardubice won the championship.

== Regular season ==
Pl.	Team	GP	W	T	L	GF–GA	Pts
1.	Tesla Pardubice	36	24	3	9	154:92	51
2.	Dukla Jihlava	36	19	8	9	156:100	46
3.	Slovan CHZJD Bratislava	36	16	6	14	119:117	38
4.	TJ SONP Kladno	36	13	10	13	107:107	36
5.	ZKL Brno	36	15	6	15	109:110	36
6.	TJ Škoda Plzeň	36	14	7	15	124:127	35
7.	CHZ Litvínov	36	13	7	16	97:135	33
8.	Spartak ČKD Prag	36	12	6	18	117:125	30
9.	VSŽ Košice	36	10	9	17	114:139	29
10.	Motor České Budějovice	36	11	4	21	88:133	26

== Playoffs ==
=== Semifinals ===
  - Tesla Pardubice – Slovan Bratislava 3:2 OT. (1:1 1:1 0:0 1:0)
  - Tesla Pardubice – Slovan Bratislava 6:1 (1:1 3:0 2:0)
  - Slovan Bratislava – Tesla Pardubice 2:1 (1:1 1:0 0:0)
  - Slovan Bratislava – Tesla Pardubice 4:3 OT. (1:1 1:1 1:1 0:0 1:0)
  - Tesla Pardubice – Slovan Bratislava 3:1 (1:0 1:1 1:0)
  - Slovan Bratislava – Tesla Pardubice 2:3 OT. (1:1 1:0 0:1 0:1)
  - Dukla Jihlava – SONP Kladno 3:0 (0:0 2:0 1:0)
  - Dukla Jihlava – SONP Kladno 4:2 (2:2 1:0 1:0)
  - SONP Kladno – Dukla Jihlava 4:7 (0:3 1:1 3:3)
  - SONP Kladno – Dukla Jihlava 1:4 (0:2 1:1 0:1)

=== 3rd place ===
  - SONP Kladno – Slovan Bratislava 7:2 (2:1 3:1 2:0)
  - SONP Kladno – Slovan Bratislava 1:4 (1:1 0:2 0:1)
  - Slovan Bratislava – SONP Kladno 1:3 (1:2 0:1 0:0)
  - Slovan Bratislava – SONP Kladno 4:2 (2:1 0:0 2:1)
  - Slovan Bratislava – SONP Kladno 5:4 OT (1:0 2:0 1:4 0:0 0:0 – 2:0)

=== Final ===
  - Tesla Pardubice – Dukla Jihlava 5:3 (2:1 1:0 2:2)
  - Tesla Pardubice – Dukla Jihlava 3:0 (3:0 0:0 0:0)
  - Dukla Jihlava – Tesla Pardubice 4:3 (1:1 2:1 1:1)
  - Dukla Jihlava – Tesla Pardubice 7:0 (2:0 5:0 0:0)
  - Tesla Pardubice – Dukla Jihlava 5:2 (2:0 1:1 2:1)
  - Dukla Jihlava – Tesla Pardubice 3:5 (2:2 0:3 1:0)

== 1. Liga-Qualification ==
Place	Team	Pts
1.	VŽKG Ostrava/Vítkovice	12
2.	Motor České Budějovice	12
3.	VTŽ Chomutov	9
4.	ZVVZ Milevsko	5
5.	Lokomotíva Bučina Zvolen	2
