= 1978–79 Czechoslovak Extraliga season =

Czechoslovak ice hockey season

The 1978–79 Czechoslovak Extraliga season was the 36th season of the Czechoslovak Extraliga, the top level of ice hockey in Czechoslovakia. 12 teams participated in the league, and Slovan CHZJD Bratislava won the championship.

== Regular season ==
Pl.	Team	GP	W	T	L	GF–GA	Pts
1.	Slovan CHZJD Bratislava	44	27	6	11	215:129	60
2.	Dukla Jihlava	44	24	9	11	149:84	57
3.	TJ Vítkovice	44	26	4	14	176:141	56
4.	Poldi SONP Kladno	44	23	5	16	172:137	51
5.	CHZ Litvínov	44	20	7	17	172:150	47
6.	Tesla Pardubice	44	18	9	17	161:158	45
7.	Sparta ČKD Praha	44	15	11	18	136:147	41
8.	VSŽ Košice	44	15	9	20	158:191	39
9.	Motor České Budějovice	44	13	9	22	126:160	35
10.	Dukla Trenčín	44	12	11	21	120:169	35
11.	Zetor Brno	44	15	4	25	126:162	34
12.	TJ Gottwaldov	44	12	4	28	120:203	28

== 1. Liga-Qualification ==
- Škoda Plzeň – Spartak Dubnica nad Váhom 3:1 (2:4, 6:1, 6:3, 6:0)
