= 1981 Canada Cup rosters =

Below are the ice hockey national team rosters of the 1981 Canada Cup.

== Canada ==
Head coach: Scotty Bowman

Assistant coaches: Red Berenson, Al MacNeil, Pierre Pagé, Tom Watt

No.	Pos.	Name	Height	Weight	Birthdate	1981-82 Team
35	G	Don Edwards	5 ft 9 in (175 cm)	165 lb (75 kg)	September 28, 1955 (aged 25)	(United States) Buffalo Sabres
1	G	Mike Liut	6 ft 2 in (188 cm)	194 lb (88 kg)	January 7, 1956 (aged 25)	(United States) St. Louis Blues
31	G	Billy Smith	5 ft 10 in (178 cm)	185 lb (84 kg)	December 12, 1950 (aged 30)	(United States) New York Islanders
3	D	Barry Beck	6 ft 3 in (191 cm)	216 lb (98 kg)	June 3, 1957 (aged 24)	(United States) New York Rangers
8	D	Ray Bourque	5 ft 11 in (180 cm)	216 lb (98 kg)	December 28, 1960 (aged 20)	(United States) Boston Bruins
2	D	Brian Engblom	6 ft 2 in (188 cm)	201 lb (91 kg)	January 27, 1955 (aged 26)	(Canada) Montreal Canadiens
4	D	Craig Hartsburg	6 ft 1 in (185 cm)	203 lb (92 kg)	June 29, 1959 (aged 22)	(United States) Minnesota North Stars
5	D	Denis Potvin (C)	6 ft 0 in (183 cm)	205 lb (93 kg)	October 29, 1953 (aged 27)	(United States) New York Islanders
24	D	Paul Reinhart	5 ft 11 in (180 cm)	205 lb (93 kg)	January 20, 1960 (aged 21)	(Canada) Calgary Flames
19	D	Larry Robinson	6 ft 4 in (193 cm)	220 lb (100 kg)	June 2, 1951 (aged 30)	(Canada) Montreal Canadiens
22	F	Mike Bossy	6 ft 0 in (183 cm)	185 lb (84 kg)	January 22, 1957 (aged 24)	(United States) New York Islanders
16	F	Marcel Dionne	5 ft 8 in (173 cm)	185 lb (84 kg)	August 3, 1951 (aged 30)	(United States) Los Angeles Kings
29	F	Ron Duguay	6 ft 2 in (188 cm)	209 lb (95 kg)	July 6, 1957 (aged 24)	(United States) New York Rangers
23	F	Bob Gainey	6 ft 2 in (188 cm)	190 lb (86 kg)	December 13, 1953 (aged 27)	(Canada) Montreal Canadiens
18	F	Danny Gare	5 ft 9 in (175 cm)	176 lb (80 kg)	May 14, 1954 (aged 27)	(United States) Buffalo Sabres
9	F	Clark Gillies	6 ft 3 in (191 cm)	209 lb (95 kg)	April 7, 1954 (aged 27)	(United States) New York Islanders
91	F	Butch Goring	5 ft 9 in (175 cm)	170 lb (77 kg)	October 22, 1949 (aged 31)	(United States) New York Islanders
99	F	Wayne Gretzky	6 ft 0 in (183 cm)	185 lb (84 kg)	January 26, 1961 (aged 20)	(Canada) Edmonton Oilers
10	F	Guy Lafleur	6 ft 0 in (183 cm)	194 lb (88 kg)	September 20, 1951 (aged 29)	(Canada) Montreal Canadiens
28	F	Ken Linseman	5 ft 11 in (180 cm)	174 lb (79 kg)	August 11, 1959 (aged 22)	(United States) Philadelphia Flyers
17	F	Rick Middleton	5 ft 11 in (180 cm)	170 lb (77 kg)	December 4, 1953 (aged 27)	(United States) Boston Bruins
11	F	Gilbert Perreault	6 ft 1 in (185 cm)	185 lb (84 kg)	November 13, 1950 (aged 30)	(United States) Buffalo Sabres
20	F	Bryan Trottier	5 ft 11 in (180 cm)	194 lb (88 kg)	July 17, 1956 (aged 25)	(United States) New York Islanders

== Czechoslovakia ==
Head coach: Luděk Bukač

No.	Pos.	Name	Height	Weight	Birthdate	1981-82 Team
1	G	Jiři Králik	5 ft 9 in (175 cm)	165 lb (75 kg)	April 11, 1952 (aged 29)	(Czechoslovakia) ASD Dukla Jihlava
2	G	Karel Lang	5 ft 9 in (175 cm)	172 lb (78 kg)	June 9, 1958 (aged 23)	(Czechoslovakia) TJ Brno
30	G	Jaromír Šindel	6 ft 1 in (185 cm)	190 lb (86 kg)	November 30, 1959 (aged 21)	(Czechoslovakia) TJ Vítkovice
5	D	Milan Chalupa	5 ft 10 in (178 cm)	185 lb (84 kg)	July 4, 1953 (aged 28)	(Czechoslovakia) ASD Dukla Jihlava
9	D	Miroslav Dvořák	5 ft 10 in (178 cm)	198 lb (90 kg)	October 11, 1951 (aged 29)	(Czechoslovakia) TJ Motor Česke Budějovice
7	D	Stanislav Hajdusek	5 ft 11 in (180 cm)	214 lb (97 kg)	March 30, 1956 (aged 25)	(Czechoslovakia) TJ Sparta Praha
4	D	Miloslav Hořava	5 ft 11 in (180 cm)	192 lb (87 kg)	August 14, 1961 (aged 20)	(Czechoslovakia) TJ Kladno
8	D	Arnold Kadlec	6 ft 2 in (188 cm)	212 lb (96 kg)	January 8, 1959 (aged 22)	(Czechoslovakia) TJ Litvínov
3	D	Jan Neliba	6 ft 0 in (183 cm)	185 lb (84 kg)	September 5, 1953 (aged 28)	(Czechoslovakia) TJ Kladno
15	D	Radoslav Svoboda	6 ft 0 in (183 cm)	183 lb (83 kg)	December 18, 1957 (aged 23)	(Czechoslovakia) ASD Dukla Jihlava
14	F	František Černík	5 ft 10 in (178 cm)	190 lb (86 kg)	June 3, 1953 (aged 28)	(Czechoslovakia) TJ Vítkovice
19	F	Jiři Dudáček	5 ft 9 in (175 cm)	170 lb (77 kg)	April 4, 1962 (aged 19)	(Czechoslovakia) TJ Kladno
22	F	Jindrich Kokrment	6 ft 0 in (183 cm)	181 lb (82 kg)	December 20, 1957 (aged 23)	(Czechoslovakia) TJ Litvínov
26	F	Jaroslav Korbela	6 ft 2 in (188 cm)	203 lb (92 kg)	May 25, 1957 (aged 24)	(Czechoslovakia) TJ Motor Česke Budějovice
10	F	Norbert Král	-	-	July 21, 1956 (aged 25)	(Czechoslovakia) TJ Motor Česke Budějovice
20	F	Jiří Lala	5 ft 10 in (178 cm)	181 lb (82 kg)	August 21, 1959 (aged 22)	(Czechoslovakia) ASD Dukla Jihlava
6	F	Milan Nový (C)	5 ft 10 in (178 cm)	196 lb (89 kg)	September 23, 1951 (aged 29)	(Czechoslovakia) TJ Kladno
21	F	Dušan Pašek	6 ft 1 in (185 cm)	201 lb (91 kg)	July 9, 1960 (aged 21)	(Czechoslovakia) HC Slovan Bratislava
17	F	Lubomir Penicka	-	-	May 8, 1954 (aged 27)	(Czechoslovakia) TJ Sparta Praha
23	F	Jaroslav Pouzar	6 ft 0 in (183 cm)	203 lb (92 kg)	January 23, 1952 (aged 29)	(Czechoslovakia) TJ Motor Česke Budějovice
12	F	Pavel Richter	5 ft 9 in (175 cm)	172 lb (78 kg)	December 5, 1954 (aged 26)	(Czechoslovakia) TJ Sparta Praha
18	F	Dárius Rusnák	6 ft 1 in (185 cm)	190 lb (86 kg)	December 2, 1959 (aged 21)	(Czechoslovakia) HC Slovan Bratislava
11	F	Oldrich Valek	6 ft 2 in (188 cm)	243 lb (110 kg)	June 9, 1960 (aged 21)	(Czechoslovakia) ASD Dukla Jihlava

== Finland ==
Head coach: Kalevi Numminen

Assistant coach: Kari Mäkinen

No.	Pos.	Name	Height	Weight	Birthdate	1981-82 Team
19	G	Hannu Lassila	-	-	February 25, 1954 (aged 27)	(Finland) HIFK
30	G	Markus Mattsson	6 ft 0 in (183 cm)	183 lb (83 kg)	July 30, 1957 (aged 24)	(United States) Tulsa Oilers
6	D	Raimo Hirvonen	5 ft 10 in (178 cm)	179 lb (81 kg)	July 20, 1957 (aged 24)	(Finland) HIFK
7	D	Juha Huikari	5 ft 11 in (180 cm)	194 lb (88 kg)	January 8, 1960 (aged 21)	(Finland) Kärpät
8	D	Tapio Levo	6 ft 1 in (185 cm)	192 lb (87 kg)	September 24, 1955 (aged 25)	(United States) Colorado Rockies
3	D	Timo Nummelin	5 ft 10 in (178 cm)	190 lb (86 kg)	September 7, 1948 (aged 33)	(Finland) TPS
9	D	Pekka Rautakallio	6 ft 3 in (191 cm)	214 lb (97 kg)	July 25, 1953 (aged 28)	(Canada) Calgary Flames
5	D	Reijo Ruotsalainen	5 ft 8 in (173 cm)	165 lb (75 kg)	April 1, 1960 (aged 21)	(United States) New York Rangers
4	D	Risto Siltanen	5 ft 7 in (170 cm)	190 lb (86 kg)	October 31, 1958 (aged 22)	(Canada) Edmonton Oilers
13	D	Juha Tuohimaa	6 ft 1 in (185 cm)	187 lb (85 kg)	June 5, 1956 (aged 25)	(Finland) Kärpät
14	F	Pekka Arbelius	5 ft 9 in (175 cm)	170 lb (77 kg)	June 22, 1960 (aged 21)	(Finland) Kärpät
10	F	Matti Hagman	6 ft 0 in (183 cm)	183 lb (83 kg)	September 21, 1955 (aged 25)	(Canada) Edmonton Oilers
12	F	Kari Jalonen	6 ft 2 in (188 cm)	185 lb (84 kg)	January 6, 1960 (aged 21)	(Finland) Kärpät
21	F	Arto Javanainen	6 ft 0 in (183 cm)	190 lb (86 kg)	April 8, 1959 (aged 22)	(Finland) Ässät
13	F	Veli-Pekka Ketola (C)	6 ft 2 in (188 cm)	238 lb (108 kg)	March 28, 1948 (aged 33)	(United States) Colorado Rockies
16	F	Markku Kiimalainen	6 ft 0 in (183 cm)	172 lb (78 kg)	October 8, 1955 (aged 25)	(Finland) Kärpät
17	F	Jari Kurri	6 ft 0 in (183 cm)	198 lb (90 kg)	May 18, 1960 (aged 21)	(Canada) Edmonton Oilers
15	F	Mikko Leinonen	5 ft 11 in (180 cm)	176 lb (80 kg)	July 5, 1955 (aged 26)	(United States) New York Rangers
23	F	Kari Makkonen	6 ft 0 in (183 cm)	183 lb (83 kg)	January 20, 1955 (aged 26)	(Finland) Ässät
25	F	Jukka Porvari	5 ft 11 in (180 cm)	174 lb (79 kg)	January 19, 1954 (aged 27)	(United States) Colorado Rockies
18	F	Jorma Sevon	5 ft 11 in (180 cm)	198 lb (90 kg)	February 7, 1958 (aged 23)	(Finland) Tappara
20	F	Ilkka Sinisalo	6 ft 0 in (183 cm)	187 lb (85 kg)	July 10, 1958 (aged 23)	(United States) Philadelphia Flyers

== Sweden ==
Head coach: Anders Parmström

Assistant coach: Jan-Erik Nilsson

No.	Pos.	Name	Height	Weight	Birthdate	1981-82 Team
25	G	Pelle Lindbergh	5 ft 9 in (175 cm)	170 lb (77 kg)	May 24, 1959 (aged 22)	(United States) Maine Mariners (Note: Played 8 games for the Philadelphia Flyers, Maine's NHL affiliate)
1	G	Peter Lindmark	5 ft 11 in (180 cm)	179 lb (81 kg)	November 8, 1956 (aged 24)	(Sweden) Timrå IK
30	G	Göte Wälitalo	6 ft 0 in (183 cm)	176 lb (80 kg)	July 18, 1956 (aged 25)	(Sweden) IF Björklöven
16	D	Thomas Eriksson	6 ft 2 in (188 cm)	196 lb (89 kg)	October 16, 1959 (aged 21)	(United States) Philadelphia Flyers
4	D	Peter Helander	6 ft 1 in (185 cm)	185 lb (84 kg)	December 4, 1951 (aged 29)	(Sweden) Skellefteå AIK
24	D	Tomas Jonsson	5 ft 11 in (180 cm)	183 lb (83 kg)	April 12, 1960 (aged 21)	(United States) New York Islanders
3	D	Lars Lindgren	6 ft 2 in (188 cm)	207 lb (94 kg)	October 13, 1952 (aged 28)	(Canada) Vancouver Canucks
7	D	Stefan Persson	6 ft 1 in (185 cm)	190 lb (86 kg)	December 22, 1954 (aged 26)	(United States) New York Islanders
21	D	Börje Salming	6 ft 1 in (185 cm)	209 lb (95 kg)	April 17, 1951 (aged 30)	(Canada) Toronto Maple Leafs
9	D	Mats Waltin	5 ft 11 in (180 cm)	172 lb (78 kg)	October 7, 1953 (aged 27)	(Sweden) Djurgårdens IF
8	F	Kent-Erik Andersson	6 ft 2 in (188 cm)	185 lb (84 kg)	May 24, 1951 (aged 30)	(United States) Minnesota North Stars
26	F	Jan Erixon	6 ft 0 in (183 cm)	196 lb (89 kg)	July 8, 1962 (aged 19)	(Sweden) Skellefteå AIK
23	F	Thomas Gradin	5 ft 11 in (180 cm)	174 lb (79 kg)	February 18, 1956 (aged 25)	(Canada) Vancouver Canucks
15	F	Anders Hedberg	5 ft 10 in (178 cm)	174 lb (79 kg)	February 25, 1951 (aged 30)	(United States) New York Rangers
17	F	Anders Håkansson	6 ft 2 in (188 cm)	192 lb (87 kg)	April 20, 1956 (aged 25)	(United States) Minnesota North Stars
28	F	Anders Kallur	5 ft 10 in (178 cm)	190 lb (86 kg)	July 6, 1952 (aged 29)	(United States) New York Islanders
18	F	Bengt Lundholm	6 ft 0 in (183 cm)	181 lb (82 kg)	August 4, 1955 (aged 26)	(Canada) Winnipeg Jets
12	F	Lars Molin	6 ft 0 in (183 cm)	176 lb (80 kg)	May 7, 1956 (aged 25)	(Canada) Vancouver Canucks
14	F	Kent Nilsson	6 ft 0 in (183 cm)	187 lb (85 kg)	August 31, 1956 (aged 25)	(Canada) Calgary Flames
11	F	Ulf Nilsson	5 ft 11 in (180 cm)	176 lb (80 kg)	May 11, 1950 (aged 31)	(United States) Springfield Indians
22	F	Jörgen Pettersson	6 ft 2 in (188 cm)	185 lb (84 kg)	July 11, 1956 (aged 25)	(United States) St. Louis Blues
20	F	Thomas Steen	5 ft 10 in (178 cm)	170 lb (77 kg)	June 8, 1960 (aged 21)	(Canada) Winnipeg Jets
19	F	Patrik Sundström	6 ft 0 in (183 cm)	205 lb (93 kg)	December 14, 1961 (aged 19)	(Sweden) IF Björklöven

== United States ==
Head coach: Bob Johnson

Assistant coach: John Cunniff

No.	Pos.	Name	Height	Weight	Birthdate	1981-82 Team
31	G	Steve Baker	6 ft 3 in (191 cm)	201 lb (91 kg)	May 6, 1957 (aged 24)	(United States) Springfield Indians (Note: Played 6 games with the New York Rangers, Springfield's NHL affiliate)
35	G	Tony Esposito	5 ft 11 in (180 cm)	185 lb (84 kg)	April 23, 1943 (aged 38)	(United States) Chicago Black Hawks
1	G	Chico Resch	5 ft 9 in (175 cm)	165 lb (75 kg)	July 10, 1948 (aged 33)	(United States) Colorado Rockies
4	D	Bill Baker	6 ft 1 in (185 cm)	192 lb (87 kg)	November 29, 1956 (aged 24)	(United States) Colorado Rockies
3	D	Richie Dunn	6 ft 0 in (183 cm)	194 lb (88 kg)	May 12, 1957 (aged 24)	(United States) Buffalo Sabres
5	D	Mark Howe	5 ft 11 in (180 cm)	190 lb (86 kg)	May 28, 1955 (aged 26)	(United States) Hartford Whalers
26	D	Dave Langevin	6 ft 2 in (188 cm)	216 lb (98 kg)	May 15, 1954 (aged 27)	(United States) New York Islanders
23	D	Rod Langway	6 ft 3 in (191 cm)	218 lb (99 kg)	May 3, 1957 (aged 24)	(Canada) Montreal Canadiens
28	D	Reed Larson	6 ft 0 in (183 cm)	194 lb (88 kg)	July 30, 1956 (aged 25)	(United States) Detroit Red Wings
6	D	Ken Morrow	6 ft 5 in (196 cm)	205 lb (93 kg)	October 17, 1956 (aged 24)	(United States) New York Islanders
20	D	Mike O'Connell	5 ft 9 in (175 cm)	181 lb (82 kg)	November 25, 1955 (aged 25)	(United States) Boston Bruins
7	F	Neal Broten	5 ft 9 in (175 cm)	170 lb (77 kg)	November 29, 1959 (aged 21)	(United States) Minnesota North Stars
13	F	Dave Christian	5 ft 11 in (180 cm)	176 lb (80 kg)	May 12, 1959 (aged 22)	(Canada) Winnipeg Jets
25	F	Steve Christoff	6 ft 1 in (185 cm)	181 lb (82 kg)	January 23, 1958 (aged 23)	(United States) Minnesota North Stars
18	F	Mike Eaves	5 ft 10 in (178 cm)	181 lb (82 kg)	June 10, 1956 (aged 25)	(United States) Minnesota North Stars
8	F	Robbie Ftorek (C)	5 ft 10 in (178 cm)	154 lb (70 kg)	January 2, 1952 (aged 29)	(Canada) Quebec Nordiques
21	F	Tom Gorence	6 ft 0 in (183 cm)	190 lb (86 kg)	March 11, 1957 (aged 24)	(United States) Philadelphia Flyers
9	F	Mark Johnson	5 ft 9 in (175 cm)	161 lb (73 kg)	September 22, 1957 (aged 23)	(United States) Pittsburgh Penguins
15	F	Rob McClanahan	5 ft 10 in (178 cm)	181 lb (82 kg)	January 9, 1958 (aged 23)	(United States) Hartford Whalers
14	F	Bob Miller	5 ft 10 in (178 cm)	174 lb (79 kg)	September 28, 1956 (aged 24)	(United States) Colorado Rockies
27	F	Warren Miller	5 ft 11 in (180 cm)	165 lb (75 kg)	June 15, 1953 (aged 28)	(United States) Hartford Whalers
19	F	Dean Talafous	6 ft 4 in (193 cm)	181 lb (82 kg)	August 25, 1953 (aged 28)	(United States) New York Rangers
29	F	Tom Younghans	6 ft 0 in (183 cm)	174 lb (79 kg)	January 22, 1953 (aged 28)	(United States) Minnesota North Stars (Note: Began the season with Minnesota; played 5 games for the Nashville South Stars (Minnesota's Central Hockey League affiliate), 7 games for the Springfield Indians, and 47 games for the New York Rangers.)

== USSR ==
Head coach: Viktor Tikhonov

Assistant coach: Vladimir Yurzinov

No.	Pos.	Name	Height	Weight	Birthdate	1981-82 Team
1	G	Vladimir Myshkin	5 ft 11 in (180 cm)	154 lb (70 kg)	June 19, 1955 (aged 26)	(Soviet Union) Dynamo Moskva
20	G	Vladislav Tretiak	6 ft 0 in (183 cm)	201 lb (91 kg)	April 25, 1952 (aged 29)	(Soviet Union) CSKA Moskva
30	G	Alexander Tyzhnykh	6 ft 0 in (183 cm)	176 lb (80 kg)	May 26, 1958 (aged 23)	(Soviet Union) CSKA Moskva
4	D	Sergei Babinov	5 ft 11 in (180 cm)	183 lb (83 kg)	July 11, 1955 (aged 26)	(Soviet Union) CSKA Moskva
14	D	Zinetula Bilyaletdinov	5 ft 11 in (180 cm)	190 lb (86 kg)	March 13, 1955 (aged 26)	(Soviet Union) Dynamo Moskva
2	D	Viacheslav Fetisov	6 ft 0 in (183 cm)	218 lb (99 kg)	April 20, 1958 (aged 23)	(Soviet Union) CSKA Moskva
18	D	Irek Gimayev	5 ft 10 in (178 cm)	194 lb (88 kg)	September 2, 1957 (aged 24)	(Soviet Union) CSKA Moskva
7	D	Alexei Kasatonov	6 ft 1 in (185 cm)	196 lb (89 kg)	October 14, 1959 (aged 21)	(Soviet Union) CSKA Moskva
5	D	Vasili Pervukhin	5 ft 11 in (180 cm)	203 lb (92 kg)	January 1, 1956 (aged 25)	(Soviet Union) Dynamo Moskva
6	D	Valeri Vasiliev (C)	6 ft 0 in (183 cm)	190 lb (86 kg)	August 3, 1949 (aged 32)	(Soviet Union) Dynamo Moskva
3	D	Vladimir Zubkov	6 ft 2 in (188 cm)	198 lb (90 kg)	January 14, 1958 (aged 23)	(Soviet Union) CSKA Moskva
13	F	Nikolai Drozdetsky	6 ft 1 in (185 cm)	185 lb (84 kg)	June 14, 1957 (aged 24)	(Soviet Union) CSKA Moskva
25	F	Vladimir Golikov	6 ft 1 in (185 cm)	185 lb (84 kg)	June 10, 1954 (aged 27)	(Soviet Union) Dynamo Moskva
8	F	Sergei Kapustin	5 ft 11 in (180 cm)	192 lb (87 kg)	February 13, 1953 (aged 28)	(Soviet Union) Spartak Moskva
15	F	Andrei Khomutov	5 ft 10 in (178 cm)	181 lb (82 kg)	April 21, 1961 (aged 20)	(Soviet Union) CSKA Moskva
9	F	Vladimir Krutov	5 ft 9 in (175 cm)	194 lb (88 kg)	June 1, 1960 (aged 21)	(Soviet Union) CSKA Moskva
11	F	Igor Larionov	5 ft 9 in (175 cm)	172 lb (78 kg)	December 3, 1960 (aged 20)	(Soviet Union) CSKA Moskva
24	F	Sergei Makarov	5 ft 11 in (180 cm)	183 lb (83 kg)	June 19, 1958 (aged 23)	(Soviet Union) CSKA Moskva
10	F	Alexander Maltsev	5 ft 9 in (175 cm)	170 lb (77 kg)	April 20, 1949 (aged 32)	(Soviet Union) Dynamo Moskva
23	F	Viktor Shalimov	5 ft 10 in (178 cm)	176 lb (80 kg)	April 20, 1951 (aged 30)	(Soviet Union) Spartak Moskva
21	F	Sergei Shepelev	5 ft 10 in (178 cm)	176 lb (80 kg)	October 13, 1955 (aged 25)	(Soviet Union) Spartak Moskva
26	F	Alexander Skvortsov	5 ft 7 in (170 cm)	190 lb (86 kg)	August 28, 1954 (aged 27)	(Soviet Union) Torpedo Gorky
22	F	Viktor Zhluktov	6 ft 2 in (188 cm)	209 lb (95 kg)	January 26, 1954 (aged 27)	(Soviet Union) CSKA Moskva

== Sources ==
- "Coupe Canada 1981 Canada Cup" Official Match Program, Controlled Media Corp.,1981
