= Phil Housley =

American ice hockey player and coach (born 1964)

- Hockey Hall of Fame, 2015
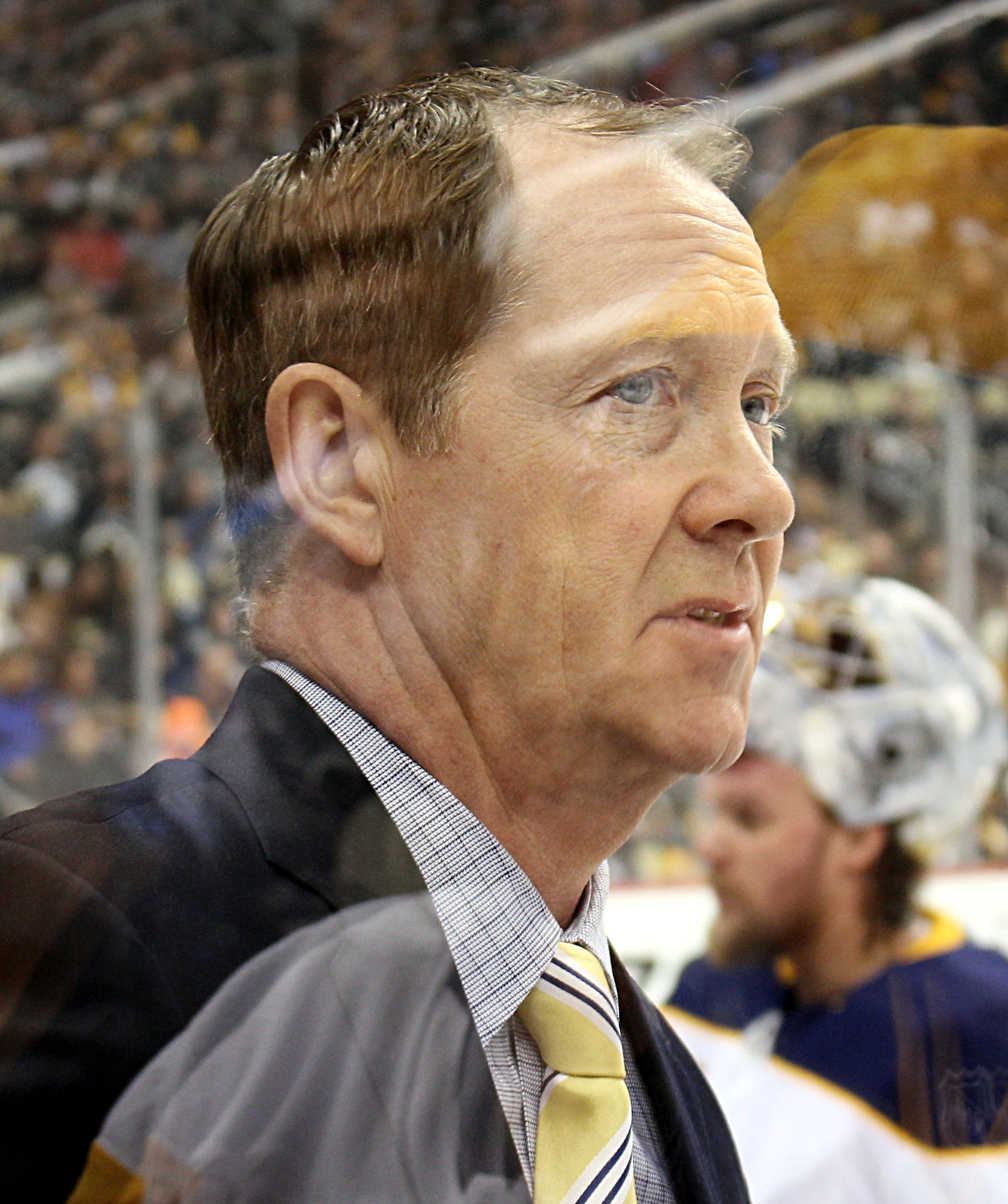
- Housley in 2017
- Born: March 9, 1964 (age 62) Saint Paul, Minnesota, U.S.
- Height: 5 ft 10 in (178 cm)
- Weight: 185 lb (84 kg; 13 st 3 lb)
- Position: Defense
- Shot: Left
- Played for: Buffalo Sabres; Winnipeg Jets; St. Louis Blues; Zürcher SC; Calgary Flames; New Jersey Devils; Washington Capitals; Chicago Blackhawks; Toronto Maple Leafs
- National team: United States
- NHL draft: 6th overall, 1982; Buffalo Sabres
- Playing career: 1982–2003
Medal record
Representing United States
Men's ice hockey
World Cup of Hockey
Gold medal – first place	1996 World Cup of Hockey	Tournament
Olympic Games
Silver medal – second place	2002 Salt Lake City	Tournament

Phillip Francis Housley (born March 9, 1964) is an American professional ice hockey coach and former defenseman in the National Hockey League (NHL). He currently serves as an associate coach for the Los Angeles Kings. He played 21 seasons in the NHL for the Buffalo Sabres, Winnipeg Jets, St. Louis Blues, Calgary Flames, New Jersey Devils, Washington Capitals, Chicago Blackhawks, and Toronto Maple Leafs.

An offensive-minded defenseman, Housley was drafted by the Sabres as an 18-year-old teenager from high school in the first round of the 1982 NHL entry draft and immediately made the team, spending no time in the minor leagues. In a career that went from 1982 to 2003 that saw him play 1,495 games, Housley recorded 338 goals and 894 assists for a total of 1,232 points. His points and games played were records for an American-born player when he retired; each record was subsequently surpassed. Housley was selected to the NHL All-Star Game seven times as a player. Internationally, he won the 1996 World Cup of Hockey as part of the American team. He was inducted into the IIHF Hall of Fame in 2012 and the Hockey Hall of Fame in 2015.

After retiring as a player, Housley became a head coach at Stillwater Area High School in his home state of Minnesota, serving from 2004 to 2013. He also served as an assistant coach for Team USA and their appearances in the World Junior Ice Hockey Championship in 2007 and 2011. In 2013, he served as head coach for Team USA for the World Junior Ice Hockey Championships, who won the gold medal. Later that year, he was hired to become an assistant coach with the Nashville Predators. In 2017, he was hired to serve as head coach of the Buffalo Sabres, which saw him coach for two seasons. He served as an assistant coach for Arizona Coyotes of the NHL from 2019 to 2022, and assistant coach of the New York Rangers from 2023 to 2025. He was hired by the Los Angeles Kings in 2026.

== Early life ==
Housley was born on March 9, 1964, in Saint Paul, Minnesota to parents Mary Lee and LeRoy. He is the youngest of their three children. While his father worked in the family business of construction, he also served as an assistant coach on Housley's squirt team.

== Playing career ==
=== Amateur ===
Housley played centre throughout his youth hockey career before switching to defense in high school. As a 10-year-old Squirt-level player, he scored 108 goals in one season. He improved to 113 goals at the peewee level. Upon attending South St. Paul High School, Housley was moved to defense by coach Doug Woog. He also played quarterback for the high school football team and left fielder on their baseball team. As a defenseman, Housley helped South St. Paul reach back-to-back state tournaments, while also playing junior hockey for the St. Paul Vulcans. During his high school years, Housley gained the attention of Buffalo Sabres scout Rudy Migay and Sabres head coach Scotty Bowman. To ensure the Sabres drafted an elite defenseman, Bowman struck a deal with the Washington Capitals general manager to ensure the Sabres drafted either Scott Stevens or Housley in the 1982 NHL entry draft.

At the age of 18, Housley became the only high school student selected to compete for Team USA at the 1982 Ice Hockey World Championships. He was originally only intended to fill in on the roster until NHL players were available, but was able to remain on the team through the entire tournament. During the World Championships, Housley played as a centreman instead of defense and scored one goal while Team USA failed to medal. He also committed to play colleagiate hockey at the University of Minnesota (U of M), with the additional goal of competing for Team USA at the 1984 Winter Olympics.

As his family could not afford to attend the draft in Montreal, Housley made the trip alongside a local sportswriter. After the Capitals selected Stevens fifth overall, the Sabres drafted Housley. He was the first American-born player and first high school player to be selected in the draft. After rejecting the Sabres' original offer, his agent used his college eligibility as leverage during contract negotiations. He eventually signed a three-year $500,000 contract, which included a stipulation to pay for his education. While he was unable to play for U of M, Housley intended to take summer classes to earn his degree.

=== Professional ===
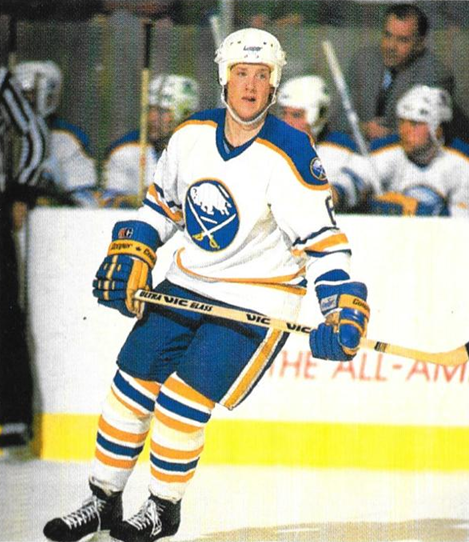
Housley with the Buffalo Sabres in 1988

Housley was named to the opening night roster of the Buffalo Sabres for the 1982–83 season after attending their training camp. Although ankle injuries marred his start, Housley finished the season setting a Sabres rookie record with 47 assists. Based on his play during training camp and through exhibition games, media pundits began comparing him to Bobby Orr. While he had never suffered injuries in hockey before, his ankles began bothering him as the season began. He nearly sat out of the Sabres' season opener against the Quebec Nordiques on October 6 due to an ankle injury, but chose to compete. He recorded his first NHL point, an assist on Ric Seiling's goal, in his debut that night. Despite missing three games in October due to sore ankles, Housley recorded two goals and eight assists through his first seven games. Four of those points were collected in a single period on October 17 against the Edmonton Oilers. Although he started the season playing alongside Mike Ramsey, by November he was more often skating with fellow rookie Hannu Virta. However, in an effort to improve his confidence, Housley was switched from defense to centreman between Sean McKenna and Gilles Hamel in mid-November. In their first game together, Housley had two assists and McKenna tallied three assists. He played three games as a centerman before returning to defense. By the start of December, Housley had three goals and ranked second on the team with 15 assists. Housley was again moved to center after Bowman sent Dave Andreychuk back to juniors in mid-December. In his first game with Gil Perreault and Mike Foligno, they combined for three goals in a 5–4 win over the Quebec Nordiques. Through 18 games at the end of December and start of January, Housley scored five goals and 13 assists. On January 23, 1984, Housley scored his first career NHL hat-trick to lead the Sabres to a 5–2 win over the Winnipeg Jets. All three of his goals were scored on the Sabres' power play and brought his total goals to 11. By mid-February, Housley ranked fourth among all rookies in scoring with 49 points and first among all 1982 draft picks. On March 27, 1983, Housley set a franchise record for most goals scored by a Sabres defenseman in a single season. After tallying two assists a few games later, Housley became the third-highest scoring rookie defenseman in NHL history. Housley was named to the inaugural NHL All-Rookie Team and finished second in the Calder Trophy voting to Steve Larmer.

On March 18, 1984 (nine days after turning 20 years old), Housley became the youngest defencemen in NHL history to score 30 goals in a single season. In his eight seasons with Buffalo, he recorded 60-point seasons in each of them. On June 16, 1990, the day of the 1990 NHL entry draft, Housley was traded to the Winnipeg Jets in a four-player deal (which also saw draft pick swapping) that saw Dale Hawerchuk go to the Sabres while Housley, Scott Arniel, and Jeff Parker went to Winnipeg. In his three seasons with Winnipeg, he was named to the All-Star Game each time while seeing his point totals rise from 76 in his first season to his peak in his final year with 97 points (18 goals, 79 assists); the 1991–92 season saw him finish the highest for the James Norris Memorial Trophy at 3rd place for his defense and named to the NHL Second All-Star Team for the only time. Housley was tabbed as a "Group 2 Free Agent" in the summer and expressed no desire to re-sign with the team. On September 24, 1994, the Jets traded Housley to the St. Louis Blues for Nelson Emerson and Stephane Quintal.

As a Group 2 Free Agent, any team signing Housley would have been required to compensate the Jets with first round draft picks or a player of equal value. In 26 games for the Blues, he had seven goals and 15 assists while being limited due to a back injury. He was traded to the Calgary Flames for Al MacInnis (due to the restricted free agency at the time, two second round draft picks were sent the Flames in compensation In 43 games, he had 43 points (8 goals, 35 assists) in 43 games. He played most of the following 1995–96 season with Calgary; on February 26, 1996, he was traded by the Flames with Dan Keczmer to the New Jersey Devils for Tommy Albelin, Cale Hulse and Jocelyn Lemieux. In 81 total games, he had his last 50-assist season with 51 to go along with 17 goals. After the season ended, he participated in the 1996 World Cup of Hockey for the American team, who won the championship. Housley signed as a free agent with the Washington Capitals in the summer, which saw him record 40 points in his first season. The 1997–98 season saw a variety of accomplishments for Housley. On November 8, he scored his 1,000th point on an assist to a goal scored by Calle Johansson, doing so at home in Washington against the Edmonton Oilers. He was the 48th player to record 1,000 points, the second American-born player to reach the mark (first since Joe Mullen), and he was the fifth defenseman to ever reach the mark. The Capitals rolled all the way to the Stanley Cup Final. In his only Stanley Cup Final appearance, Housley recorded no points with one penalty as the Capitals were swept by the Detroit Red Wings. He was claimed off waivers by the Flames in the summer of 1998.

Housley recorded 50-point seasons in the next two seasons, and he was selected to the 2000 National Hockey League All-Star Game, his seventh and final All-Star selection. He closed out his tenure in Calgary with the 2000–01 season with four goals and 30 assists. The Chicago Blackhawks claimed him off waivers in September 2001. In his first season with Chicago, he had 15 goals and 24 assists. He was selected to play for the American team at the 2002 Winter Olympics. He had four assists and a goal (scoring the third goal in an eventual 3-2 victory Russia in the Semifinals) as the Americans won the silver medal. The 2002–03 season saw him hobbled by an ankle injury and he was on crutches when the trade deadline neared. To his shock, he was traded by Chicago on March 11, 2003 to the Toronto Maple Leafs for two draft picks. On an injury timetable that saw him tabbed to possibly play in the postseason, he played one regular season game for the team and admitted that he was not 100%, stating, “I was trying to catch a moving train once I got into the playoffs." He played 40 combined minutes in the first two games of the Eastern Conference quarterfinals against Philadelphia before playing 64 total seconds in Game 3. The Game 3 appearance ended up as his final appearance in the NHL as the Maple Leafs lost in seven games. Nursing a broken foot from February, Housley was a free agent after the year ended and did not get any offers close to his Minnesota home. On January 15, 2004, he announced his retirement.

With 338 goals and 894 assists for a total of 1,232 points, Housley retired as the all-time points leader for an American-born player until he was passed by Mike Modano in 2007. He still ranks as the all-time leader for American defenceman and he ranks fourth all-time in points for all primary defensemen.

== Coaching career ==
From 2004 to 2013, Housley coached high school hockey at Stillwater Area High School in Stillwater, Minnesota, helping to rebuild the program to respectability. From 2013 to 2017, Housley was an assistant coach for the Nashville Predators, working primarily with defensemen.

On January 5, 2013, Housley coached Team USA to the gold medal at the 2013 IIHF World U20 Championship in Ufa, Russia. He had served as an assistant coach on Team USA's 2007 and 2011 appearances in the World Juniors.

On June 15, 2017, it was announced that Housley was hired by the Buffalo Sabres as their new head coach. He led the Sabres to a 31st-place finish in his first season and saw the Sabres attain a 10-game winning streak early in his second season before the team collapsed down the stretch. Housley was fired by the Sabres after the 2018–19 season on April 7, 2019.

On June 26, 2019, it was announced that Housley had signed a multi-year contract as assistant coach for the Arizona Coyotes. For the Coyotes, Housley served as defensive coordinator and power play coach.

With his contract set to expire, Housley and the Coyotes agreed to part ways on May 1, 2022. He joined the New York Rangers as an associate coach in June 2023. The Rangers dismissed Housley in April 2025. In June 2026, he was hired to serve as associate head coach for the Los Angeles Kings.

== Legacy ==
Housley was inducted into the United States Hockey Hall of Fame in 2004, and was inducted into the Hockey Hall of Fame on November 9, 2015. On February 7, 2007, he was inducted into the Buffalo Sabres Hall of Fame, commemorated in a pre-game ceremony with former head coach Scotty Bowman on hand.

== Personal life ==
Housley grew up in South St. Paul, Minnesota. He is married to his high school sweetheart, Karin Housley, a Minnesota state senator. The Housleys have four children and reside in St. Marys Point, Minnesota as of 2018.

== Career playing statistics ==
=== Regular season and playoffs ===
			Regular season					Playoffs
Season	Team	League	GP	G	A	Pts	PIM	GP	G	A	Pts	PIM
1980–81	South St. Paul	HS-MN	18	28	26	54	—	—	—	—	—	—
1980–81	St. Paul Vulcans	USHL	6	7	7	14	6	10	5	5	10	0
1981–82	South Saint Paul	HS-MN	22	31	34	65	18	—	—	—	—	—
1982–83	Buffalo Sabres	NHL	77	19	47	66	39	10	3	4	7	2
1983–84	Buffalo Sabres	NHL	75	31	46	77	33	3	0	0	0	6
1984–85	Buffalo Sabres	NHL	73	16	53	69	28	5	3	2	5	2
1985–86	Buffalo Sabres	NHL	79	15	47	62	54	—	—	—	—	—
1986–87	Buffalo Sabres	NHL	78	21	46	67	57	—	—	—	—	—
1987–88	Buffalo Sabres	NHL	74	29	37	66	96	6	2	4	6	6
1988–89	Buffalo Sabres	NHL	72	26	44	70	47	5	1	3	4	2
1989–90	Buffalo Sabres	NHL	80	21	60	81	32	6	1	4	5	4
1990–91	Winnipeg Jets	NHL	78	23	53	76	24	—	—	—	—	—
1991–92	Winnipeg Jets	NHL	74	23	63	86	92	7	1	4	5	0
1992–93	Winnipeg Jets	NHL	80	18	79	97	52	6	0	7	7	2
1993–94	St. Louis Blues	NHL	26	7	15	22	12	4	2	1	3	4
1994–95	Zürcher SC	NDA	10	6	8	14	34	—	—	—	—	—
1994–95	Calgary Flames	NHL	43	8	35	43	18	7	0	9	9	0
1995–96	Calgary Flames	NHL	59	16	36	52	22	—	—	—	—	—
1995–96	New Jersey Devils	NHL	22	1	15	16	8	—	—	—	—	—
1996–97	Washington Capitals	NHL	77	11	29	40	24	—	—	—	—	—
1997–98	Washington Capitals	NHL	64	6	25	31	24	18	0	4	4	4
1998–99	Calgary Flames	NHL	79	11	43	54	52	—	—	—	—	—
1999–2000	Calgary Flames	NHL	78	11	44	55	24	—	—	—	—	—
2000–01	Calgary Flames	NHL	69	4	30	34	24	—	—	—	—	—
2001–02	Chicago Blackhawks	NHL	80	15	24	39	34	5	0	1	1	4
2002–03	Chicago Blackhawks	NHL	57	6	23	29	24	—	—	—	—	—
2002–03	Toronto Maple Leafs	NHL	1	0	0	0	0	3	0	0	0	0
NHL totals			1,495	338	894	1,232	822	85	13	43	56	36

=== International ===
Year	Team	Event	GP	G	A	Pts	PIM
1982	United States	WJC	7	1	0	1	6
1982	United States	WC	7	1	0	1	4
1984	United States	CC	6	0	2	2	0
1986	United States	WC	10	2	6	8	4
1987	United States	CC	5	0	2	2	4
1989	United States	WC	7	3	4	7	2
1996	United States	WCH	1	0	1	1	0
2000	United States	WC	7	2	3	5	0
2001	United States	WC	9	0	1	1	4
2002	United States	OLY	6	1	4	5	0
2003	United States	WC	6	1	1	2	4
Junior totals			7	1	0	1	6
Senior totals			64	10	24	34	22

== Head coaching record ==
Team	Year	Regular season						Postseason
Team	Year	G	W	L	OTL	Pts	Finish	Result
BUF	2017–18	82	25	45	12	62	8th in Atlantic	Missed playoffs
BUF	2018–19	82	33	39	10	76	6th in Atlantic	Missed playoffs
Total		164	58	84	22	138		

== Awards and achievements ==
- Member of the United States Hockey Hall of Fame (2004)
- NHL All-Rookie Team (1983)
- NHL Second All-Star Team (1992)
- Played in NHL All-Star Game (1984, 1989, 1990, 1991, 1992, 1993, 2000)
- Second runner-up Norris Trophy (1992)
- Inducted into the Hockey Hall of Fame (2015)

== International play ==
- 1984 Canada Cup (fourth place)
- 1987 Canada Cup (fifth place)
- 1996 World Cup of Hockey (first place)
- Ice Hockey World Championships: 1982 (eight place), 1986 (sixth place), 1989 (sixth place), 2000 (fifth place), 2001 (fourth place), 2003 (13th place)
- IIHF World U20 Championship: 2013 (Head Coach - Gold Medal)
- 2013 Men's World Ice Hockey Championships (Assistant Coach- Bronze Medal)
- Inducted into the IIHF Hall of Fame in 2012

== See also ==
- List of members of the United States Hockey Hall of Fame
- List of NHL statistical leaders
- List of NHL players with 1,000 games played
- List of NHL players with 1,000 points

Awards and achievements
Preceded by Jiří Dudáček	Buffalo Sabres first-round draft pick 1982	Succeeded by Paul Cyr
Sporting positions
Preceded by Dan Bylsma	Head coach of the Buffalo Sabres; 2017–2019	Succeeded by Ralph Krueger
