= Jörgen Pettersson =

Jörgen Pettersson may refer to:

- Jörgen Pettersson (ice hockey) (born 1956), Swedish hockey player
- Jörgen Pettersson (footballer) (born 1975), Swedish footballer
