= Peter Helander =

Swedish ice hockey player

- Born: 4 December 1951 (age 74) Stockholm, Sweden
- Height: 6 ft 1 in (185 cm)
- Weight: 185 lb (84 kg; 13 st 3 lb)
- Position: Defence
- Shot: Left
- Played for: Skellefteå AIK; Los Angeles Kings
- National team: Sweden
- NHL draft: 153rd overall, 1982; Los Angeles Kings
- Playing career: 1971–1983

Hans Peter Helander (born December 4, 1951) is a Swedish former ice hockey player who played seven games for the Los Angeles Kings in the National Hockey League during the 1982–83 season. The rest of his career, which lasted from 1971 to 1983, was mainly spent with Skellefteå AIK in the Swedish Elitserien. Internationally Helander played for the Swedish national team at the 1981 and 1982 World Championships, and the 1981 Canada Cup.

== Career ==
Peter Helander began his career with Rönnskärs IF in 1971, playing there until 1974. He then joined Skellefteå AIK, first for a year in Division 1 and from the 1975–76 season in the newly founded Elitserien. With Skellefteå AIK he won the Swedish championship in the 1977–78 season. In 1981 and 1982 he was elected to the Swedish World All Star team. In the 1982 NHL entry draft he was in the eighth round, 153rd overall, by the Los Angeles Kings. He joined the Kings in the 1982–83 season, playing seven games. The rest of the season was spent with their minor league affiliate, the New Haven Nighthawks of the American Hockey League. Helander retired after the season.

=== International ===
With the Swedish national team, Helander participated in the World Championships in 1981 and 1982. In addition, he played in the 1981 Canada Cup.

== Career statistics ==
=== Regular season and playoffs ===
			Regular season					Playoffs
Season	Team	League	GP	G	A	Pts	PIM	GP	G	A	Pts	PIM
1971–72	Rönnskärs IF	SWE-2	18	2	2	4	—	—	—	—	—	—
1972–73	Clemensnäs IF	SWE-2	17	5	2	7	—	—	—	—	—	—
1973–74	Clemensnäs IF	SWE-2	24	3	2	5	—	—	—	—	—	—
1974–75	Skellefteå AIK	SWE	8	0	0	0	8	—	—	—	—	—
1975–76	Skellefteå AIK	SWE	7	1	1	2	6	—	—	—	—	—
1976–77	Skellefteå AIK	SWE	29	5	2	7	26	—	—	—	—	—
1977–78	Skellefteå AIK	SWE	29	0	4	4	40	5	0	0	0	8
1978–79	Skellefteå AIK	SWE	36	7	4	11	40	—	—	—	—	—
1979–80	Skellefteå AIK	SWE	32	6	8	14	61	1	0	0	0	0
1980–81	Skellefteå AIK	SWE	33	6	8	14	59	3	1	0	1	11
1981–82	Skellefteå AIK	SWE	30	6	2	8	50	—	—	—	—	—
1982–83	Los Angeles Kings	NHL	7	0	1	1	0	—	—	—	—	—
1982–83	New Haven Nighthawks	AHL	9	1	3	4	0	—	—	—	—	—
SWE totals			204	31	30	61	290	8	1	0	1	16
NHL totals			7	0	1	1	0	—	—	—	—	—

=== International ===
Year	Team	Event	GP	G	A	Pts	PIM
1981	Sweden	WC	8	1	2	3	8
1981	Sweden	CC	5	0	2	2	8
1982	Sweden	WC	10	1	2	3	14
Senior totals			23	2	6	8	30

== Achievements and awards ==
- 1978 Swedish champion with the Skellefteå AIK
- 1981 silver medal at the World Championship
- 1981 Swedish World All-Star Team
- 1982 Swedish World All-Star Team
