= 1981 Canada Cup =

1981 edition of the Canada Cup

Tournament details
- Host country: Canada
- Venues: 4 (in 4 host cities)
- Dates: September 1–13, 1981
- Teams: 6

Final positions
- Champions: Soviet Union (1st title)

Tournament statistics
- Games played: 18
- Goals scored: 128 (7.11 per game)
- Attendance: 158,594 (8,811 per game)
- Scoring leader: (Canada) Wayne Gretzky (12 pts)

Awards
- MVP: (Soviet Union) Vladislav Tretiak

The 1981 Labatt Canada Cup was the second best-on-best ice hockey world championship and involved the world's top six hockey nations. Tournament games were held in Edmonton, Winnipeg, Montreal and Ottawa. The Soviet Union defeated Canada in a single game final to win its first title by the score of 8–1. Soviet goaltender Vladislav Tretiak was named most valuable player. Canada's Wayne Gretzky led the tournament in scoring with 12 points.

This second edition of the Canada Cup was originally scheduled to be held in 1979 but was postponed due to disputes between the Canadian Amateur Hockey Association and Hockey Canada. It was postponed a second time in 1980 following the Soviet invasion of Afghanistan and Canada's boycott of sporting events with the Soviet Union as a result. When finally held in 1981, tournament organizer Alan Eagleson speculated it could be the last such event due to rising costs and disappointing attendance. Eagleson generated additional controversy when he refused to allow the Soviets to take the Canada Cup trophy with them to the Soviet Union.

== Organization ==
At its congress in the summer of 1978, the International Ice Hockey Federation approved proposals to hold the second and third Canada Cup tournaments in 1979 and 1982. However, tensions between Canada's rival governing bodies, the Canadian Amateur Hockey Association (CAHA) and Hockey Canada, increased after the latter body accused the CAHA of reneging on promises it had made regarding Hockey Canada's control of international events involving professional players. Hockey Canada's chief negotiator for international events, Alan Eagleson, accused the CAHA of attempting to sabotage the Canada Cup and threatened to cancel the tournament if the CAHA refused to compromise with his body.

The tournament was put in further jeopardy in January 1979 when General Motors withdrew as a major sponsor; Eagleson argued GM withdrew as a result of the dispute with the CAHA. The disputes put the two bodies on the verge of severing all ties, a move that would have led to Hockey Canada refusing to release any professional or university player to any of Canada's national teams. The tournament was ultimately postponed by a year until September 1980.

The Soviet invasion of Afghanistan in December 1979 and threatened boycott of the 1980 Summer Olympics in Moscow led organizers to consider again postponing the Canada Cup. While Eagleson initially favoured allowing the tournament to go ahead regardless of the political situation, he ultimately agreed that Hockey Canada should again postpone the Canada Cup after the Canadian Government joined the Olympic boycott. A brief effort to move the tournament to Sweden was quickly put down when Eagleson informed them that neither Hockey Canada nor the National Hockey League Players' Association (NHLPA) would participate in such an event.

Undaunted, Eagleson and IIHF president Günther Sabetzki announced that the tournament had again been rescheduled for September 1981. This time, the tournament went ahead as scheduled.

== Teams ==
The Soviet Union treated the 1976 Canada Cup with disdain, but entered this tournament intent on re-asserting themselves following their upset loss to the United States at the 1980 Winter Olympics. They were led by the "KLM Line" of Vladimir Krutov, Igor Larionov, and Sergei Makarov on offence, as well as Viacheslav Fetisov and Alexei Kasatonov on defence, with the venerable Vladislav Tretiak in goal. Featuring a strong mixture of veterans and young players, the Soviets entered the tournament as favourites.

Canada brought a considerably younger team to the 1981 Canada Cup compared to their 1976 entry. Three defencemen – Ray Bourque, Paul Reinhart, and Craig Hartsburg – were under the age of 22, while 20-year-old Wayne Gretzky was expected to be the offensive catalyst. Gretzky's pairing with Guy Lafleur and Gilbert Perreault was highly anticipated (and they would combine with each other on 22% of Team Canada's goals), while the New York Islanders quartet of Mike Bossy, Bryan Trottier, Butch Goring, and Clark Gillies were also expected to be offensive leaders.

With 17 National Hockey League (NHL) players on their roster, Sweden felt confident they could upset the Soviet Union and Canada by utilizing a system of strong team play. Kent Nilsson (coming off a 131-point season for the Calgary Flames), Thomas Steen, Ulf Nilsson, and Börje Salming were expected to be the team's leaders. With only five returning players from 1976 – when they reached the finals – and hurt by the defections of the Šťastný brothers (Peter, Marián and Anton) to Canada, the Czechoslovak team entered the tournament in the midst of a rebuilding phase and were not considered contenders in 1981.

The Americans, riding high following their gold medal victory at the 1980 Olympics, were considered capable of potentially upsetting the stronger teams in the tournament. Mark Howe, Rod Langway, and seven players from the 1980 Olympic team (Bill Baker, Neil Broten, Dave Christian, Steve Christoff, Mark Johnson, Rob McClanahan, and Ken Morrow) were expected to lead the United States. Tony Esposito was the American goaltender for the tournament; he had represented Canada at the 1972 Summit Series, but gained his American citizenship in time to represent his new nation. As in 1976, Finland was expected to finish last in the six-team tournament despite the fact that the Finnish hockey association considered the team sent to Canada among the best their nation had assembled.

== Games ==
=== Round robin ===
The tournament opened on September 1 at Northlands Coliseum in Edmonton as the Americans defeated a disorganized Swedish team, 3–1. Swedish coach Anders Parmström, upset at how his team underestimated the Americans, sat several of his top players for extended periods of the third period. At the Winnipeg Arena, a young Czechoslovak team battled the Soviet Union to a 1–1 draw in a game marked by rough play. The Soviets were forced to rely on the stellar goaltending of Vladislav Tretiak to preserve the tie. In the third game of the opening day, Canada's "dream line" of Gretzky, Lafleur and Gilbert Perreault combined for ten points as Canada easily defeated Finland 9–0. The second line of Gillies, Trottier and Bossy also combined to score ten points in the game.

Finland fared little better against Czechoslovakia two nights later, dropping a 7–1 result. Finnish goaltender Hannu Lassila was the star of the game, however, as he made several difficult saves to keep the Finns close through two periods. Despite outshooting Finland 26–9, the Czechs managed only a 2–1 lead after 40 minutes before finally overcoming Lassila to score five goals in the third period. Sweden attempted to employ a physical style against the Soviet Union without success, as they surrendered five power play goals in a 6–3 loss. Canada then defeated the United States, 8–3, in a game that was played much closer than the score indicated. The Americans appeared to be headed to a draw with Canada as the two teams were tied at three with nine minutes to play before a power play goal by Mike Bossy sparked a five-goal outburst for the Canadians in the dying minutes of the game.

The Soviets then avenged their 1980 Olympic defeat to the United States with a 4–1 win, while the Swedes defeated Finland 5–0. Ending the third night of play, Czechoslovakia was able to overcome a late two-minute, two-man disadvantage to emerge with a 4–4 tie against Canada in a game that was described as the best of the tournament. Canada then defeated Sweden 4–3, but not before losing Perreault to a broken ankle. Perreault was Canada's leading scorer over the first four games and was considered a contender to be named most valuable player at the time of his injury. The United States then overcame an early two-goal deficit against the Czechs to win 6–2 while the Soviets easily defeated Finland 6–1

The final night of round robin play opened with a meaningless game between the United States and Finland. The Americans had already advanced to the playoff round while Finland had been eliminated. The game ended in a 4–4 draw and was most notable for Montreal Forum staff accidentally playing the Italian national anthem instead of the Finnish anthem prior to the start of the game. The Czechs then easily defeated Sweden, 7–1, to advance to the playoff round and eliminate the Swedes. Canada and the Soviet Union closed out the round robin with a battle for first place. A five-goal outburst by Canada in the third period broke a 2–2 tie and sent Canada into the playoffs as the top ranked team. Their 7–3 win was the most lopsided victory Canada had recorded against the Soviets in 20 years.

=== Semi-finals ===
As the top team in the playoff round, Canada faced the fourth place Americans in the first semi-final. Talk entering the game revolved around the defensive style of the United States and whether they could overcome Canada's offensive game and upset the favoured nation in a one-game, winner-take-all scenario. Early play favoured Canada, as they opened the scoring 2:01 into the game on a goal by defenceman Brian Engblom, then extended their lead five minutes later when a long shot by Bossy eluded Esposito in the American goal. Another goal by Bossy saw Canada end the first period with a 3–0 lead. The remaining 40 minutes of the game lacked emotion, and the two teams traded goals for a 4–1 Canadian victory.

The second place Soviet Union faced third ranked Czechoslovakia in the second semi-final. Soviet coach Viktor Tikhonov was agitated following his nation's 7–3 defeat to Canada to end the round robin, while the Czechs had grown increasingly confident of their ability as the tournament progressed. It was the Soviets, however, who scored three first period goals to take an early 3–0 lead. The young Czechoslovak team pressured their opponents for much of the final 40 minutes, outshooting the Soviets 23–11 in the second and third periods combined. Tretiak withstood the pressure in the Soviet goal, however, allowing only one goal as the Soviet Union emerged with a 4–1 victory.

=== Final ===
Canada entered the final facing pressure to defeat the Soviets. The Soviet national team's easy victory over the National Hockey League's all-stars in the 1979 Challenge Cup left the Canadians searching to regain command of their rivalry with the Soviets. Coach Scotty Bowman called it a "must win game" for Canada: "We really are favorites in the final. Nobody in this country will tolerate a loss." The players also spoke of their desire to show the Soviets that they were the world's top hockey nation. But also the Soviet Union was under pressure, as their most desirable trophy, the Olympic gold medal, had been denied them by the United States Amateur team, during the 1980 Winter Olympics at Lake Placid. During their pre-game preparations, Tikhonov called upon his team to play the finest games of their lives: "Today you got to play so well that the entire Canadian population will talk about you afterwards and remember you for a long time. Play so well that the Canadian fans when they will leave Forum will wait for you when you get on the bus after the game and admire you."

Canada held the early advantage of play, outshooting the Soviets 12–4 in the first period as their opponent was unable to generate offence. Unlike the North American style, shooting the puck across the blue line. The Soviets instead passed the puck sideways, to a player coming from behind with higher speed, which requires an exceptional interaction. And Canada was unable to put a puck past Tretiak, with the first period ending with no scoring. The Soviets counterattacked in the second period, opening the scoring five minutes in on a goal by Igor Larionov. Clark Gillies tied the game for Canada three minutes later, but Sergei Shepelev restored the Soviet lead three minutes after that. Shepelev added a powerplay goal late in the period to give the Soviets a 3–1 lead heading into the third period. The third period turned into a rout; Shepelev completed a natural hat trick, and the Soviets scored three goals in the final four minutes to claim the championship by an 8–1 score.

Canadian goaltender Mike Liut became the scapegoat for Canada's embarrassing loss. The game was one of the worst of his career, but Canada managed only four shots in the third period and never threatened the Soviets even though they entered the final 20 minutes down by only two goals. Tretiak, meanwhile, was named the tournament most valuable player on the strength of his goaltending throughout the event.

== Legacy ==
The fate of the championship trophy itself was the subject of controversy after Canadian hockey officials accompanied by Montreal Police prevented the Soviet team from taking the trophy back to the Soviet Union. As he took the Cup from the Soviets at the airport, Eagleson claimed that the trophy was intended to remain in Canada at all times. The decision upset the Soviets who claimed that Eagleson's decision was made "in violation of the traditions existing at international competitions". George Smith, a truck driver from Winnipeg, organized a fundraising campaign that raised enough money to create a replica trophy that was gifted to Soviet officials at their Canadian embassy. Soviet officials praised the sportsmanship of the Canadian people as they accepted the replica. The replica was made despite a threatened lawsuit for copyright infringement by Hockey Canada president Lou Lefaive, but he later said, "If someone wants to send $11,000 worth of nickel to Moscow that's not my business."

Tournament organizer Allan Eagleson, lamenting the rapidly increasing costs of hosting such an event, speculated that the 1981 Canada Cup could be the last. Noting that some costs had increased up to 200% over what was paid in 1976, Eagleson speculated that a third Canada Cup might have to be held in a different format. Organizers were also disappointed in tournament attendance. The two games scheduled to be held in Quebec City were transferred to Ottawa after only 300 tickets were pre-sold for the round robin game between Czechoslovakia and Sweden and 1,000 for the semi-final game. Low ticket sales also led to fears that the games scheduled for Winnipeg would also be moved, but the investments the television partners had made in rental equipment to broadcast the games from Winnipeg prevented a switch. Adding to Eagleson's woes, Toronto Maple Leafs owner Harold Ballard refused to allow any games to be held in Maple Leaf Gardens as a result of his hatred of the Soviet Union.

Strong support in Montreal, and the response in Ottawa after the games were moved to the national capital left Eagleson increasingly confident in the tournament's future. The 1981 Canada Cup turned a profit of about C$1 million to be split between Hockey Canada and the National Hockey League Players' Association pension fund, one third that of the 1976 tournament. Shortly after the tournament ended, Eagleson confirmed he intended to hold a third Canada Cup. He noted that Canada's loss in the final played a role in his decision: "As far as I am concerned personally, it's probably preferable that we lost. I think if we had won, I'd have said, 'To hell with it'."

== Round-robin standings ==
Team	Pld	W	D	L	GF	GA	GD	Pts	Qualification
Canada	5	4	1	0	32	13	+19	9	Advanced to semifinals
Soviet Union (C)	5	3	1	1	20	13	+7	7	Advanced to semifinals
Czechoslovakia	5	2	2	1	21	13	+8	6	Advanced to semifinals
United States	5	2	1	2	17	19	−2	5	Advanced to semifinals
Sweden	5	1	0	4	13	20	−7	2	
Finland	5	0	1	4	6	31	−25	1	

(C) Champions

== Game scores ==
=== Round-robin ===
September 1, 1981	United States	3–1 ( 2–0, 0–1, 1–0 )	Sweden	Northlands Coliseum, Edmonton; Attendance: 6,721

Tony Esposito
Goalies
Peter Lindmark

Larson (Dunn) – 7:22	1–0
Christian (Gorence, Dunn) – 12:18	2–0
	2–1	25:47 – Gradin (Kallur, Jonsson)
O'Connell – 44:39	3–1

16 min
Penalties
12 min
24
Shots
29

September 1, 1981	Soviet Union	1–1 ( 0–0, 1–1, 0–0 )	Czechoslovakia	Winnipeg Arena; Attendance: 3,516

Vladislav Tretiak	Goalies	Karel Lang
/ 0–1 / 21:57 – Nový (Richter, Dudáček); Drozdetsky (Maltsev) – 29:34 / 1–1
14 min	Penalties	12 min
18	Shots	30

September 1, 1981	Canada	9–0 ( 1–0, 5–0, 3–0 )	Finland	Northlands Coliseum, Edmonton; Attendance: 8,991

Mike Liut
Goalies
Markus Mattsson

Bossy (Gillies, Trottier) – (PP) 16:43	1–0
Gretzky (Lafleur, Perreault) – 21:50	2–0
Bourque (Lafleur, Perreault) – 25:32	3–0
Gare (Perreault, Gretzky) – 32:25	4–0
Bossy (Trottier, Gainey) – 38:46	5–0
Gretzky (Lafleur, Perreault) – 39:54	6–0
Trottier (Bossy, Gillies) – 40:48	7–0
Goring (Potvin) – 43:18	8–0
Gillies (Duguay, Trottier) – 47:56	9–0

8 min
Penalties
6 min
42
Shots
24

September 3, 1981	Finland	1–7 (1–2, 0–0, 0–5)	Czechoslovakia	Northlands Coliseum, Edmonton; Attendance: 5,103

Hannu Lassila
Goalies
Karel Lang

	0–1	10:46 (PP) – Richter
	0–2	15:49 – Lála (Kokrment)
Hagman (Siltanen) – 16:49	1–2
	1–3	41:35 – Hořava (Nový, Richter)
	1–4	45:13 – Kral (Penicka, Lála)
	1–5	47:38 – Kadlec (Hajdusek, Kokrment)
	1–6	49:45 (PP) – Lála (Kokrment, Kadlec)
	1–7	53:31 – Rusnák (Chalupa)

10 min
Penalties
10 min
17
Shots
53

September 3, 1981	Sweden	3–6 (0–2, 2–1, 1–3)	Soviet Union	Winnipeg Arena; Attendance: 3,318

Pelle Lindbergh
Goalies
Vladislav Tretiak

	0–1	9:21 (PP) – Kapustin (Fetisov)
	0–2	15:07 (PP) – Makarov (Larionov, Krutov)
Håkansson (K. Nilsson) – 22:34	1–2
	1–3	35:38 – Kapustin (Shalimov, Babinov)
Hedberg (U. Nilsson, Molin) – 36:15	2–3
	2–4	49:28 – Kasatonov (Fetisov)
Molin – (SH) 50:56	3–4
	3–5	55:28 – Maltsev (Pervukhin
	3–6	57:25 (PP) – Krutov (Makarov, Kasatonov)

18 min
Penalties
14 min
24
Shots
34

September 3, 1981	United States	3–8 (1–1, 0–2, 2–5)	Canada	Northlands Coliseum, Edmonton; Attendance: 11,348

Tony Esposito
Goalies
Mike Liut

	0–1	3:43 – Perreault (Gretzky, Lafleur)
Christoff – 5:01	1–1
	1–2	22:26 – Gretzky (Gare)
	1–3	27:16 – Dionne (Gare, Potvin)
Talafous (Broten) – (PP) 44:04	2–3
Johnson (O'Connell, Eaves) – 44:53	3–3
	3–4	50:55 (PP) – Bossy (Gretzky, Middleton)
	3–5	51:46 – Trottier (Gare, Bourque)
	3–6	53:25 – Gretzky (Lafleur, Perreault)
	3–7	55:15 – Trottier (Gillies, Bossy)
	3–8	56:40 – Perreault (Hartsburg, Bourque)

10 min
Penalties
14 min
31
Shots
36

September 5, 1981	Sweden	5–0 (1–0, 0–0, 4–0)	Finland	Winnipeg Arena; Attendance: 3,698

Peter Lindmark
Goalies
Hannu Lassila

Hedberg (U. Nilsson, Helander) – 3:46	1–0
Kallur (Gradin, K. Nilsson) – 46:09	2–0
U. Nilsson (Molin, Hedberg) – 48:21	3–0
Kallur (Salming, Håkansson) – 50:40	4–0
Lundholm (Sundström, Andersson) – 57:57	5–0

12 min
Penalties
16 min
32
Shots
28

September 5, 1981	Soviet Union	4–1 (1–0, 2–1, 1–0)	United States	Northlands Coliseum, Edmonton; Attendance: 13,482

Vladislav Tretiak
Goalies
Tony Esposito

Larionov (Fetisov, Kasatonov) – (PP) 15:34	1–0
	1–1	21:57 – Broten (Howe, Talafous)
Zhluktov (Fetisov) – 22:52	2–1
Krutov (Makarov, Babinov) – 23:55	3–1
Golikov (Drozdetsky) – 48:07	4–1

10 min
Penalties
8 min
33
Shots
25

September 5, 1981	Czechoslovakia	4–4 (2–2, 0–1, 2–1)	Canada	Winnipeg Arena; Attendance: 10,392

Karel Lang
Goalies
Mike Liut

Dudacek (Svoboda) – (PP) 5:22	1–0
Kral – 9:27	2–0
	2–1	18:13 (SH) – Goring (Potvin, Liut)
	2–2	19:47 – Bossy (Trottier, Gillies)
	2–3	23:51 – Dionne (Gare, Middleton)
Kokrment – 47:47	3–3
	3–4	51:18 – Gainey (Duguay, Goring)
Dudacek (Svoboda) – 55:21	4–4

14 min
Penalties
10 min
29
Shots
33

September 7, 1981	Sweden	3–4 (0–2, 1–1, 2–1)	Canada	Montreal Forum; Attendance: 11,603

Peter Lindmark
Goalies
Mike Liut

	0–1	3:57 – Potvin (Lafleur, Perreault)
	0–2	5:29 – Bossy (Bourque)
Hedberg (Lindmark) – 29:57	1–2
	1–3	31:51 – Lafleur (Gretzky, Bourque)
Hedberg (Salming, Lindgren) – 45:50	2–3
	2–4	46:55 – Perreault (Lafleur)
Kallur (Gradin) – 49:22	3–4

6 min
Penalties
2 min
16
Shots
33

September 7, 1981	Soviet Union	6–1 (2–0, 1–1, 3–0)	Finland	Winnipeg Arena; Attendance: 2,412

Vladislav Tretiak
Goalies
Markus Mattson

Krutov (Kasatonov, Makarov) – 4:39	1–0
Drozdetsky (Kasatonov) – 17:34	2–0
	2–1	20:24 – Sinisalo (Hagman, Levo)
Makarov (Krutov) – 32:44	3–1
Shalimov (Shepelev, Drozdetsky) – (PP) 56:07	4–1
Fetisov (Kasatonov, Krutov) – (PP) 57:36	5–1
Zhulktov – (SH) 58:23	6–1

20 min
Penalties
14 min
31
Shots
24

September 7, 1981	Czechoslovakia	2–6 (1–0, 1–2, 0–4)	United States	Montreal Forum; Attendance: 10,448

Karel Lang (40:41)
Jiri Kralik (19:19)
Goalies
Tony Esposito

Kokrment (Lala) – (SH) 13:38	1–0
Rusnak (Pasek, Chalupa) – 20:35	2–0
	2–1	25:07 – Eaves (Howe, Langevin)
	2–2	37:16 – Talafous (Christoff, Broten)
	2–3	40:23 – Talafous (Langway, Christoff)
	2–4	40:41 – Eaves, Johnson, Howe)
	2–5	45:01 (PP) – Dunn (Larson, Eaves)
	2–6	45:20 – Miller (Eaves, Johnson)

12 min
Penalties
14 min
27
Shots
25

September 9, 1981	Finland	4–4 (1–1, 1–2, 2–1)	United States	Montreal Forum; Attendance: 9,412

Hannu Lassila
Goalies
Steve Baker

Siltanen (Hagman, Kurri) – 16:13	1–0
	1–1	16:52 – Broten (O'Connell, Christoff)
	1–2	22:39 – Broten (Talafous, Christoff)
Porvari (Jalonen, Rautakallio) – 30:23	2–2
	2–3	37:47 – Gorence (Miller, Howe)
	2–4	41:41 – Miller (O'Connell, Christoff)
Kiimalainen (Ruotsalainen, Leinonen) – 42:19	3–4
Javanainen (Sevon) – 48:38	4–4

4 min
Penalties
6 min
22
Shots
46

September 9, 1981	Sweden	1–7 (0–2, 1–3, 0–2)	Czechoslovakia	Ottawa Civic Centre; Attendance: 2,988

Peter Lindmark (27:37)
Pelle Lindbergh (32:23)
Goalies
Karel Lang

	0–1	0:26 – Rusnak (Dudacek, Korbella)
	0–2	19:54 – Dudacek (Dvorak)
	0–3	26:42 – Pouzar (Dvorak, Pasek)
	0–4	27:37 (PP) – Dudacek (Nový, Svoboda)
Molin (Hedberg, Sundström – 28:33	1–4
	1–5	31:49 – Lala (Penicka)
	1–6	40:31 (PP2) – Horava (Kadlec)
	1–7	45:23 – Rusnak (Pouzar)

10 min
Penalties
13 min
33
Shots
29

September 9, 1981	Canada	7–3 (1–0, 1–2, 5–1)	Soviet Union	Montreal Forum; Attendance: 16,001

Don Edwards
Goalies
Vladimir Myshkin

Gretzky (Dionne) – 0:58	1–0
Lafleur (Gretzky, Potvin) – (PP) 23:49	2–0
	2–1	21:45 (PP) – Larionov (Kasatonov, Makarov)
	2–2	23:40 – Shepelev (Zhluktov, Kapustin)
Middleton (Linseman, Gare) – 44:08	3–2
Dionne (Lafleur, Gretzky) – 46:29	4–2
Potvin – 48:27	5–2
Bossy (Gillies, Trottier) – 48:59	6–2
Goring (Gainey) – 51:25	7–2
	7–3	58:44 (PP) – Makarov (Fetisov, Kasatonov)

16 min
Penalties
10 min
33
Shots
23

=== Semi-finals ===
September 11, 1981	Czechoslovakia	1–4 (0–3, 0–1, 1–0)	Soviet Union	Ottawa Civic Centre; Attendance: 7,500

Karel Lang
Goalies
Vladislav Tretiak

	0–1	8:36 (PP) – Shepelev (Bilyaletdinov)
	0–2	15:12 – Golikov
	0–3	16:41 – Shalimov (Shepelev)
	0–4	31:09 (PS) – Shepelev
Lala (Dvorak) – 47:39	1–4

10 min
Penalties
12 min
27
Shots
24

September 11, 1981	United States	1–4 (0–3, 1–0, 0–1)	Canada	Montreal Forum; Attendance: 15,660

Tony Esposito
Goalies
Mike Liut

	0–1	2:01 – Engblom (Gainey, Goring)
	0–2	7:27 – Bossy (Robinson, Trottier)
	0–3	17:54 – Bossy (Potvin, Trottier)
Eaves (Johnson, Dunn) – (PP) 39:34	1–3
	1–4	52:18 – Dionne (Gretzky, Lafleur)

8 min
Penalties
14 min
17
Shots
23

=== Final ===
September 13, 1981	Soviet Union	8–1 (0–0, 3–1, 5–0)	Canada	Montreal Forum; Attendance: 17,033

Vladislav Tretiak
Goalies
Mike Liut

Larionov (Krutov, Makarov) – 24:56	1–0
	1–1	28:02 – Gillies (Bossy, Trottier)
Shepelev (Fetisov, Kasatonov) – 31:15	2–1
Shepelev (Kapustin, Kasatonov) – (PP) 36:28	3–1
Shepelev (Makarov) – 41:39	4–1
Krutov – (SH) 44:08	5–1
Larionov (Kasatonov), Fetisov) – (PP) 56:00	6–1
Golikov (Gimayev, Shalimov) – 58:39	7–1
Skvortsov (Vasiliev) – 59:19	8–1

12 min
Penalties
12 min
26
Shots
27

== Final standings ==
1	Soviet Union
2	Canada
3	Czechoslovakia
4	United States
5	Sweden
6	Finland

== Statistical leaders ==
=== Scoring ===
Player	Team	GP	G	A	Pts	PIM
Wayne Gretzky	Canada	7	5	7	12	2
Mike Bossy	Canada	7	8	3	11	2
Bryan Trottier	Canada	7	3	8	11	6
Guy Lafleur	Canada	7	2	9	11	0
Alexei Kasatonov	Soviet Union	7	1	10	11	8
Gilbert Perreault	Canada	4	3	6	9	0
Sergei Makarov	Soviet Union	7	3	6	9	0
Sergei Shepelev	Soviet Union	7	6	2	8	4
Vladimir Krutov	Soviet Union	7	4	4	8	10
Viacheslav Fetisov	Soviet Union	7	1	7	8	10

=== Goaltending ===
Player	Team	GP	Min	W	L	T	SO	SV%	GAA
Vladislav Tretiak	Soviet Union	6	360	5	0	1	0	.947	1.33
Karel Lang	Czechoslovakia	6	341	2	2	2	0	.894	2.35
Mike Liut	Canada	6	360	4	1	1	1	.867	3.17
Peter Lindmark	Sweden	4	208	1	2	0	1	.888	3.17
Tony Esposito	United States	5	300	2	3	0	0	.872	3.80

Minimum 120 minutes played

== Awards ==
Recipient	Team
Most Valuable Player
Vladislav Tretiak	Soviet Union
All-Star team
G – Vladislav Tretiak	Soviet Union
D – Arnold Kadlec	Czechoslovakia
D – Alexei Kasatonov	Soviet Union
F – Mike Bossy	Canada
F – Gilbert Perreault	Canada
F – Sergei Shepelev	Soviet Union

== See also ==
- List of international ice hockey competitions featuring NHL players
- Summit Series
- World Cup of Hockey
