= Pavel Richter =

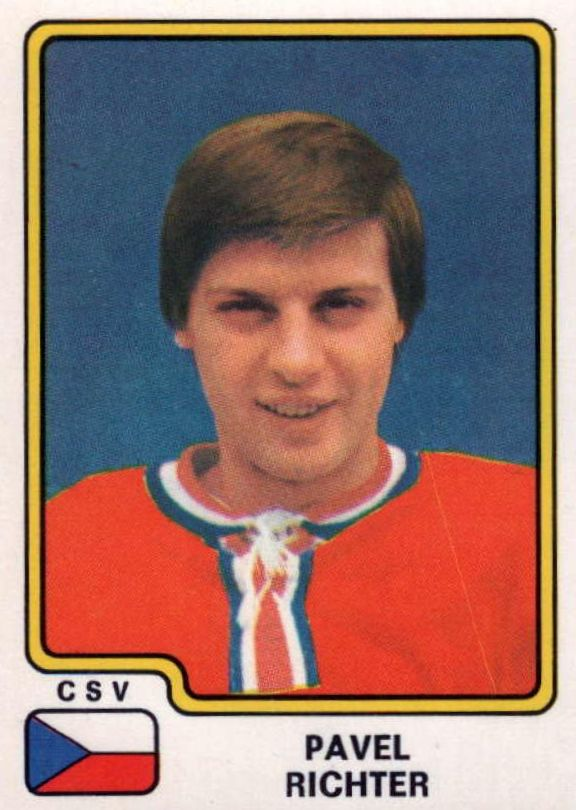
- Born: 5 December 1954 (age 71) Prague, Czechoslovakia
- Height: 5 ft 9 in (175 cm)
- Weight: 172 lb (78 kg; 12 st 4 lb)
- Position: Forward
- Shot: Left
- Played for: TJ ČKD Sparta Praha; ASVŠ Dukla Trenčín; EHC Kloten; ESV Kaufbeuren
- National team: Czechoslovakia
- Playing career: 1973–1992

Pavel Richter
Medal record

Representing Czechoslovakia

Men's Ice Hockey
Silver medal – second place	1984 Sarajevo	Team

Pavel Richter (born 5 December 1954, in Prague) is a Czech former professional ice hockey forward who played for the Czechoslovak national team. He won a silver medal at the 1984 Winter Olympics.

Richter played in the Czechoslovak First Ice Hockey League for TJ ČKD Sparta Praha and ASVŠ Dukla Trenčín between 1973 and 1985.

== Career statistics ==
=== Regular season and playoffs ===
			Regular season					Playoffs
Season	Team	League	GP	G	A	Pts	PIM	GP	G	A	Pts	PIM
1974–75	TJ Sparta ČKD Praha	TCH
1975–76	TJ Sparta ČKD Praha	TCH
1976–77	TJ Sparta ČKD Praha	TCH
1977–78	TJ Sparta ČKD Praha	TCH	44	19	15	34	39	—	—	—	—	—
1979–80	ASVŠ Dukla Trenčín	TCH	44	16	16	32	26	—	—	—	—	—
1980–81	TJ Sparta ČKD Praha	TCH	33	12	21	33	20	—	—	—	—	—
1981–82	TJ Sparta ČKD Praha	TCH	33	11	16	27	40	—	—	—	—	—
1982–83	TJ Sparta ČKD Praha	TCH	44	20	44	64	18	—	—	—	—	—
1983–84	TJ Sparta ČKD Praha	TCH	44	15	26	41	51	—	—	—	—	—
1984–85	TJ Sparta ČKD Praha	TCH	41	16	20	36	49	—	—	—	—	—
1985–86	EHC Kloten	NDA	30	17	23	40	20	5	4	6	10	2
1986–87	ESV Kaufbeuren	1.GBun	35	28	28	56	—	—	—	—	—	—
TCH totals			283	109	158	267	243	—	—	—	—	—

=== International ===
Year	Team	Event	GP	G	A	Pts	PIM
1973	Czechoslovakia	EJC	5	4	4	8	2
1974	Czechoslovakia	WJC
1978	Czechoslovakia	WC	9	2	3	5	6
1981	Czechoslovakia	WC	8	4	4	8	6
1981	Czechoslovakia	CC	3	1	2	3	2
1982	Czechoslovakia	WC	10	2	1	3	6
1984	Czechoslovakia	OG	7	2	5	7	4
1985	Czechoslovakia	WC	10	3	4	7	14
Senior totals			57	15	23	38	46
