= Calle Johansson =

Swedish ice hockey player and coach (born 1967)

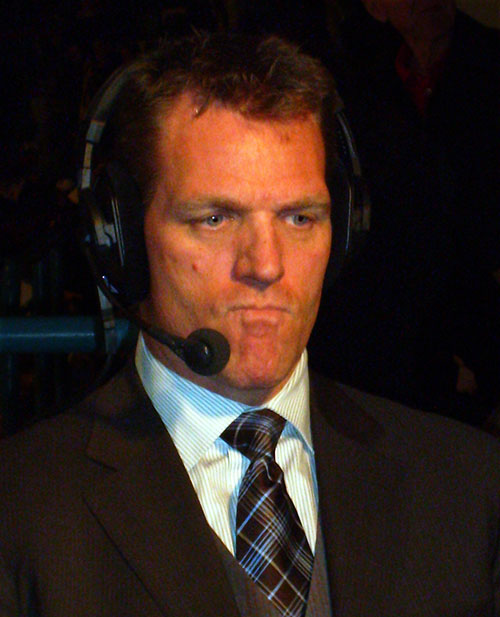
- Johansson in 2010
- Born: 14 February 1967 (age 59) Gothenburg, Sweden
- Height: 5 ft 11 in (180 cm)
- Weight: 203 lb (92 kg; 14 st 7 lb)
- Position: Defence
- Shot: Left
- Played for: Buffalo Sabres; Washington Capitals; Toronto Maple Leafs
- National team: Sweden
- NHL draft: 14th overall, 1985; Buffalo Sabres
- Playing career: 1983–2004

Carl Christian "Calle" Johansson (born 14 February 1967) is a Swedish former assistant coach with the Washington Capitals and former professional ice hockey defenceman who played 17 seasons in the National Hockey League (NHL) between 1987 and 2004, most of it with the Capitals. He has worked as hockey colour commentator for Swedish Canal+ and worked as an assistant for six seasons for Frölunda HC in the Swedish Elitserien before returning to the Capitals organization.

== Playing career ==
Johansson was drafted out of Sweden by the Buffalo Sabres, he was picked 14th overall by the Sabres in the 1985 NHL entry draft. His first season, 1987–88, was a good one, as he compiled 38 assists and 42 points and was named to the NHL All-Rookie Team. However, the next season he was traded to the Washington Capitals along with a second round draft choice in the 1989 NHL entry draft for Clint Malarchuk, Grant Ledyard, and a sixth round draft pick in the 1991 NHL entry draft.

Johansson prospered in Washington, as he became one of Washington's best defenceman over the next 15 seasons. Although he was behind the shadow of higher profile defencemen in Washington, such as Scott Stevens, Rod Langway, Kevin Hatcher, Al Iafrate and Sergei Gonchar, he was a solid contributor for the club. In the 1992–93 NHL season, Johansson was part of the defense core in Washington that set a new record for team defence scoring. Although Hatcher, Iafrate and Sylvain Côté all scored over 20 goals, Johansson helped get to the record with his seven goals.

Johansson was part of the Washington team that made their improbable run to the Stanley Cup finals in 1998, but the Capitals were defeated by the Detroit Red Wings.

Johansson retired after the 2002–03 NHL season, but the Toronto Maple Leafs persuaded him to come back and help their team in their playoff run the next season. However, the Leafs failed to win the Cup, and Johansson retired for good after the playoffs.

== Television career ==
After retiring the second time around, Johansson continued to work as a colour commentator and did studio analysis during game intermissions on Swedish Canal+. He was doing both Elitserien and NHL games and was one of the two main colour commentators at Canal+, the other one being former Tre Kronor coach Anders "Ankan" Parmström. Canal+ lost the Swedish broadcasting rights for NHL to the Viasat Group ahead of the 2009–2010 season. Together with former Canal+ commentator Niklas Holmgren, with whom Calle has developed a great chemistry when commentating, they subsequently signed for Viasat where they now continue in the same manner as when at Canal+.

== Coaching career ==
Johansson served as an assistant coach with Frolunda of the Swedish Elite League in 2006–07. On 18 July 2012 Johansson was named an assistant coach to the Washington Capitals, joining former Capitals teammate Adam Oates behind the bench. Two seasons later, on 23 June 2014 the Capitals announced that Johansson was leaving the team to rejoin his family in Sweden.

== Awards ==
- Swedish Champion with IF Björklöven in 1987.
- Named to the NHL All-Rookie Team in 1988.
- Gold medal at the 1991 and 1992 Men's World Ice Hockey Championships.
- Named to the World Cup of Hockey All-Star Team in 1996.

== Career statistics ==
=== Regular season and playoffs ===
			Regular season					Playoffs
Season	Team	League	GP	G	A	Pts	PIM	GP	G	A	Pts	PIM
1981–82	KBA-67	SWE III	27	3	3	6	—	—	—	—	—	—
1982–83	KBA-67	SWE III	29	12	11	23	—	—	—	—	—	—
1983–84	Västra Frölunda IF	SEL	28	4	4	8	10	—	—	—	—	—
1984–85	Västra Frölunda IF	SWE II	41	14	14	28	50	—	—	—	—	—
1985–86	IF Björklöven	SEL	17	1	2	3	14	—	—	—	—	—
1986–87	IF Björklöven	SEL	30	2	13	15	20	6	1	3	4	6
1987–88	Buffalo Sabres	NHL	71	4	38	42	37	6	0	1	1	0
1988–89	Buffalo Sabres	NHL	47	2	11	13	33	—	—	—	—	—
1988–89	Washington Capitals	NHL	12	1	7	8	4	6	1	2	3	0
1989–90	Washington Capitals	NHL	70	8	31	39	25	15	1	6	7	4
1990–91	Washington Capitals	NHL	81	11	41	52	23	10	2	7	9	8
1991–92	Washington Capitals	NHL	80	14	42	56	49	7	0	5	5	4
1992–93	Washington Capitals	NHL	77	7	38	45	56	6	0	5	5	4
1993–94	Washington Capitals	NHL	84	9	33	42	59	6	1	3	4	4
1994–95	EHC Kloten	NDA	5	1	2	3	8	—	—	—	—	—
1994–95	Washington Capitals	NHL	46	5	26	31	35	7	3	1	4	0
1995–96	Washington Capitals	NHL	78	10	25	35	50	—	—	—	—	—
1996–97	Washington Capitals	NHL	65	6	11	17	16	—	—	—	—	—
1997–98	Washington Capitals	NHL	73	15	20	35	30	21	2	8	10	16
1998–99	Washington Capitals	NHL	67	8	21	29	22	—	—	—	—	—
1999–2000	Washington Capitals	NHL	82	7	25	32	24	5	1	2	3	0
2000–01	Washington Capitals	NHL	76	7	29	36	26	6	1	2	3	2
2001–02	Washington Capitals	NHL	11	2	0	2	8	—	—	—	—	—
2002–03	Washington Capitals	NHL	82	3	12	15	22	6	0	1	1	0
2003–04	Toronto Maple Leafs	NHL	8	0	6	6	0	4	0	0	0	2
SEL totals			75	7	19	26	44	6	1	3	4	6
NHL totals			1,110	119	416	535	519	105	12	43	55	44

=== International ===
Calle Johansson
Medal record

Representing Sweden

Men's ice hockey

World Championships
Gold medal – first place	1991 Finland	Ice hockey
Gold medal – first place	1992 Czech Republic	Ice hockey

World Junior Championships
Bronze medal – third place	1987	Ice hockey

Year	Team	Event	GP	G	A	Pts	PIM
1984	Sweden	EJC	5	2	3	5	6
1985	Sweden	EJC	5	4	0	4	4
1986	Sweden	WJC	7	1	1	2	6
1987	Sweden	WJC	6	0	8	8	6
1991	Sweden	WC	4	1	1	2	6
1991	Sweden	CC	6	1	2	3	0
1992	Sweden	WC	5	0	0	0	4
1996	Sweden	WCH	4	1	5	6	8
1998	Sweden	OG	4	0	0	0	2
Junior totals			23	7	12	19	22
Senior totals			23	3	8	11	20

== See also ==
- NHL All-Rookie Team
- List of NHL players with 1,000 games played

Preceded by Mikael Andersson	Buffalo Sabres first-round draft pick 1985	Succeeded by Shawn Anderson
