= Radoslav Svoboda =

Czech ice hockey player (born 1957)

Medal record

Representing Czechoslovakia

Men's Ice Hockey
Silver medal – second place	1984 Sarajevo	Team

Radoslav Svoboda (born 18 December 1957 in Brno) is a Czech formar ice hockey player who played for the Czechoslovak national team. He won a silver medal at the 1984 Winter Olympics.

== Career statistics ==
=== Regular season and playoffs ===
			Regular season					Playoffs
Season	Team	League	GP	G	A	Pts	PIM	GP	G	A	Pts	PIM
1974–75	TJ ZKL Brno	TCH
1975–76	TJ ZKL Brno	TCH
1976–77	TJ Zetor Brno	TCH
1977–78	VTJ Písek	TCH III	41	10	12	22	24	—	—	—	—	—
1978–79	ASD Dukla Jihlava	TCH	1	0	0	0	0	—	—	—	—	—
1979–80	ASD Dukla Jihlava	TCH	37	6	8	14	30	—	—	—	—	—
1980–81	ASD Dukla Jihlava	TCH	26	6	2	8	12	—	—	—	—	—
1981–82	ASD Dukla Jihlava	TCH	44	2	6	8	12	—	—	—	—	—
1982–83	ASD Dukla Jihlava	TCH	43	11	8	19	28	—	—	—	—	—
1983–84	ASD Dukla Jihlava	TCH	40	5	7	12	30	—	—	—	—	—
1984–85	ASD Dukla Jihlava	TCH	30	1	7	8	10	—	—	—	—	—
1985–86	ASD Dukla Jihlava	TCH	46	6	5	11	34	—	—	—	—	—
1986–87	TJ Zetor Brno	TCH	42	6	11	17	28	—	—	—	—	—
1987–88	Esbjerg IK	DNK	30	21	23	44	27	—	—	—	—	—
1988–89	Esbjerg IK	DNK
1991–92	EC Graz II	AUT II
1992–93	UEC Mödling	AUT II
1993–94	UEC Mödling	AUT II
TCH totals			309	43	54	97	184	—	—	—	—	—

=== International ===
Year	Team	Event	GP	G	A	Pts	PIM
1981	Czechoslovakia	CC	5	0	3	3	4
1982	Czechoslovakia	WC	9	1	1	2	4
1983	Czechoslovakia	WC	9	1	2	3	2
1984	Czechoslovakia	OG	7	3	2	5	4
1985	Czechoslovakia	WC	4	0	1	1	4
Senior totals			34	5	9	14	18
