= Mike Liut =

Canadian ice hockey player

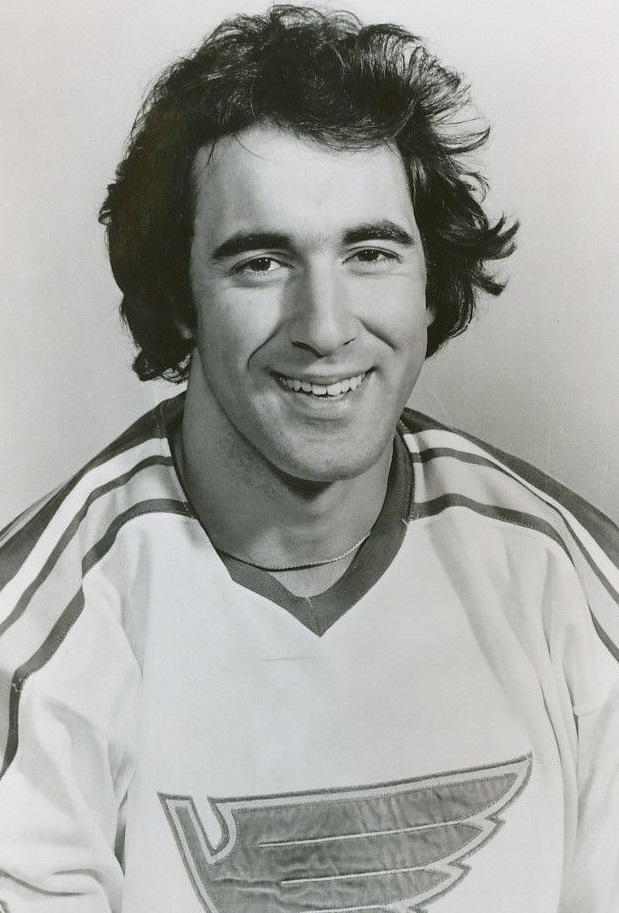
- Liut with the St. Louis Blues in 1981
- Born: January 7, 1956 (age 70) Weston, Ontario, Canada
- Height: 6 ft 2 in (188 cm)
- Weight: 195 lb (88 kg; 13 st 13 lb)
- Position: Goaltender
- Caught: Left
- Played for: Cincinnati Stingers; St. Louis Blues; Hartford Whalers; Washington Capitals
- National team: Canada
- NHL draft: 56th overall, 1976; St. Louis Blues
- WHA draft: 50th overall, 1976; New England Whalers
- Playing career: 1977–1992

Michael Dennis Liut (LEE-oot; born January 7, 1956) is a Canadian former professional ice hockey goaltender.

Liut played for the Cincinnati Stingers of the World Hockey Association (WHA) from 1977 to 1979 and for the St. Louis Blues, Hartford Whalers, and Washington Capitals of the National Hockey League (NHL) from 1979 to 1992. He won the 1981 Lester B. Pearson Award for being the most valuable player according to his fellow players, and posted the league's best goals against average in 1989–90.

== College and WHA career ==
Liut played college hockey at Bowling Green State University. After being named twice to the CCHA First All-Star team, the St. Louis Blues selected him in the fourth round 56th overall in the 1976 NHL amateur draft on June 1, 1976. However, Mike had also been drafted in the fifth round (50th overall) in the 1976 WHA amateur draft by the New England Whalers on May 17, 1976, and he would ultimately opt instead to play for the Cincinnati Stingers of the WHA for two seasons (1977 - 1979). The Whalers had traded Liut to the Stingers for Greg Carroll and Bryan Maxwell, on May, 26, 1977. Two years later, the Edmonton Oilers then claimed Liut from the Stingers at the WHA Dispersal draft that was held on June 9, 1979. When the WHA merged with the NHL in 1979, the Blues reclaimed Liut's rights from the Oilers with the 24th pick in the 1979 NHL expansion draft on June 13, 1979.

== NHL career ==
=== St. Louis Blues (1979–1985) ===
With four seasons of NCAA D1 College Hockey and two seasons of pro hockey in the World Hockey Association under his belt, Mike Liut arrived in St. Louis - and the National Hockey League - ready to step in and contribute. He immediately took over the starting duties for the Blues and made a major impact, playing 64 games and posting a record of 32-23-9. His second season saw him improve and become arguably the top goaltender in the league, posting a record of 33-14-13. He was voted runner-up to Wayne Gretzky for the Hart Memorial Trophy for his efforts, and was selected as a First Team All-Star while won the Lester B. Pearson Trophy as league MVP, as determined by his peers. That fall, he was Canada's starting goaltender at the 1981 Canada Cup, which ended with an 8–1 loss to the Soviet Union in the final on September 13, 1981. Though he was not solely to blame, his reputation as a top-tier goaltender never fully recovered from the thrashing he took in the Finals game, and he would not represent Canada again in subsequent Canada Cup tournaments.

=== Hartford Whalers (1985–1990) ===
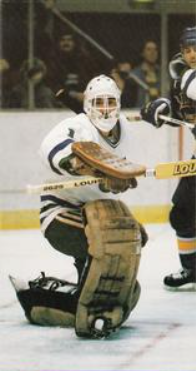
Liut with the Hartford Whalers in 1986

During his sixth season with the Blues, Liut was traded to the Hartford Whalers with Jörgen Pettersson (ice hockey) in exchange for net minder Greg Millen and forward Mark Johnson on February 21, 1985. The timing of the deal was a little odd, because the Blues were in first place in the Norris Division at the time of the transaction but the reason behind the swap appeared to be financial. The Blues, one of the most budget conscious teams in the league, moved out Liut and his reported $900,000 salary (top on the team) and brought in two players whose combined salaries were less than they were paying Liut. This was not lost on Liut, who said, "I'm sure (Blues owner Harry Ornest) has been promoting a trade of some sort because of my salary."

With the Whalers, Liut provided a steadying influence and in his second season with the club in 1985-86, he led the NHL in shutouts with four. In that same season, Liut backstopped the Whalers into the Adams Division finals, where they were defeated by the Montreal Canadiens in overtime of the seventh game in a memorable playoff series. The Canadiens went on to win the Stanley Cup that year. In 1986–87, Liut led the Whalers to their first and only Adams Division title and was named to the NHL's Second All-Star Team.

=== Washington Capitals (1990–1992) ===
He was traded to the Washington Capitals late in the campaign of the 1989–90 NHL season in exchange for forward Yvon Corriveau on March 5, 1990, leaving Hartford holding fourteen franchise goaltending records and sharing six other records. With the Capitals, Liut joined another veteran, Don Beaupre, in handling the goaltending duties and his acquisition proved important in the post season when Beaupre was felled by an injury pressing Liut into service versus the New York Rangers. Liut won three straight games, including the last two in overtime to send the Capitals to their first ever semi-final berth to face the Boston Bruins, where they were swept out of the playoffs. His heroics versus the Rangers would prove to be his last hurrah. Liut also posted the league's best goals-against average, a 2.53, while splitting time between the Whalers and Capitals, in 1989–90. He would spend two more seasons with the Capitals but had difficulty maintaining his workhorse status because of an injured back, an ailment that led to his retirement in 1991–92. Liut was the last active WHA goalie in the NHL upon his retirement. In his professional career (WHA/NHL), Liut went 324–310–78 as a starter.

Following his playing career, Liut joined the University of Michigan as an assistant coach in 1995 until the end of the 1997–98 season. He received a law degree in 1995, and now heads the ice hockey division at global sports management leader Octagon.

Liut is a second cousin of former NHL player Ron Francis (who was also his teammate on the Whalers). Liut was amongst a handful of goaltenders to sport a plain white mask throughout his NHL career, opting not to use customized artwork on his mask.

== Career achievements ==
- Ted Lindsay Award (Formerly Lester B Pearson) voted MVP by the NHLPA in 1980-81 season.
- 1st Team All-Star (1980–81)
- 2nd Team All-Star (1986–87)
- Goals Against Average leader (2.53) in 1989-90 season.
- NHL All Star Game selection (1981)
- Led NHL in Shutouts in (1986–87) and (1989–90) seasons.
- Won "Silver" in 1981 World/Canada Cup as starting Goalie for Team Canada.
- Led NHL in “games played" and "Minutes" in (1981–82) and (1982–83) seasons.
- Most wins (239) by a goalie in the decade of the 1980s
- Most shutouts (22) by a goalie in the decade of the 1980s
- Most games played (544) by a goalie in the decade of the 1980s
- Most minutes (31,597) by a goalie in the decade of the 1980s

== Career statistics ==
=== Regular season and playoffs ===
Bold indicates led league

			Regular season									Playoffs
Season	Team	League	GP	W	L	T	MIN	GA	SO	GAA	SV%	GP	W	L	MIN	GA	SO	GAA	SV%
1971–72	Markham Waxers	MetJHL	—	—	—	—	—	—	—	—	—	—	—	—	—	—	—	—	—
1972–73	Dixie Beehives	OPJHL	26	—	—	—	—	—	—	—	—	—	—	—	—	—	—	—	—
1973–74	Bowling Green State University	CCHA	24	10	12	0	1272	88	1	4.15	.870	—	—	—	—	—	—	—	—
1974–75	Bowling Green State University	CCHA	20	12	6	1	1174	78	0	3.99	.882	—	—	—	—	—	—	—	—
1975–76	Bowling Green State University	CCHA	21	13	5	0	1171	50	0	2.56	.905	—	—	—	—	—	—	—	—
1976–77	Bowling Green State University	CCHA	24	18	4	0	1346	61	2	2.72	—	—	—	—	—	—	—	—	—
1977–78	Cincinnati Stingers	WHA	27	8	12	0	1215	86	0	4.25	.870	—	—	—	—	—	—	—	—
1978–79	Cincinnati Stingers	WHA	54	23	**27**	4	3181	**184**	**3**	3.47	.882	3	1	2	179	10	0	3.35	—
1979–80	St. Louis Blues	NHL	54	**32**	23	9	3661	194	2	3.18	.896	3	0	3	193	12	0	3.73	.891
1980–81	St. Louis Blues	NHL	61	33	14	13	3570	199	1	3.34	.892	11	5	6	685	50	0	4.38	.857
1981–82	St. Louis Blues	NHL	**64**	28	28	7	**3691**	**250**	2	4.06	.876	10	5	3	494	27	0	3.28	.895
1982–83	St. Louis Blues	NHL	**68**	21	27	**13**	**3794**	235	1	3.72	.878	4	1	3	240	15	0	3.75	.899
1983–84	St. Louis Blues	NHL	58	25	29	4	3425	197	3	3.45	.884	11	6	5	714	29	1	2.44	.920
1984–85	St. Louis Blues	NHL	32	12	12	6	1869	119	1	3.82	.880	—	—	—	—	—	—	—	—
1984–85	Hartford Whalers	NHL	12	4	7	1	731	36	1	2.95	.914	—	—	—	—	—	—	—	—
1985–86	Hartford Whalers	NHL	57	27	23	4	3282	198	2	3.62	.874	8	5	2	441	14	**1**	1.90	**.938**
1986–87	Hartford Whalers	NHL	59	31	22	5	3476	187	**4**	3.23	.885	6	2	4	332	25	0	4.52	.843
1987–88	Hartford Whalers	NHL	60	25	28	5	3532	187	2	3.18	.884	3	1	1	159	11	0	4.16	.866
1988–89	Hartford Whalers	NHL	35	13	19	1	2006	142	1	4.25	.861	—	—	—	—	—	—	—	—
1989–90	Hartford Whalers	NHL	29	15	12	1	1683	74	**3**	**2.64**	.901	—	—	—	—	—	—	—	—
1989–90	Washington Capitals	NHL	8	4	4	0	478	17	**1**	**2.13**	.922	9	4	4	507	28	0	3.31	.874
1990–91	Washington Capitals	NHL	35	13	16	3	1834	114	0	3.73	.885	2	0	1	48	4	0	4.98	.867
1991–92	Washington Capitals	NHL	21	10	7	2	1123	70	1	3.74	.875	—	—	—	—	—	—	—	—
WHA totals			81	31	39	4	4,396	270	3	3.69	.878	3	1	2	179	10	0	3.35	—
NHL totals			664	293	271	74	38,209	2,221	25	3.49	.883	67	29	32	3,813	215	2	3.38	.890

=== International ===
Year	Team	Event	GP	W	L	T	MIN	GA	SO	GAA
1981	Canada	CC	6	4	1	1	360	19	1	3.17

"Liut's stats". The Goaltender Home Page.

== Awards and honours ==
CCHA

Award	Year
All-CCHA First Team	1974–75
All-CCHA Second Team	1975–76
All-CCHA First Team	1976–77
CCHA Player of the Year	1976–77

NHL

Award	Year(s)
Lester B. Pearson Award	1980–81
NHL All-Star Game	1981
NHL First All-Star Team	1980–81
NHL Second All-Star Team	1986–87

Awards and achievements
Preceded by Award Created	CCHA Player of the Year; 1976–77	Succeeded by John Markell; Don Waddell
