= Alexei Kasatonov =

Russian ice hockey player (born 1959)

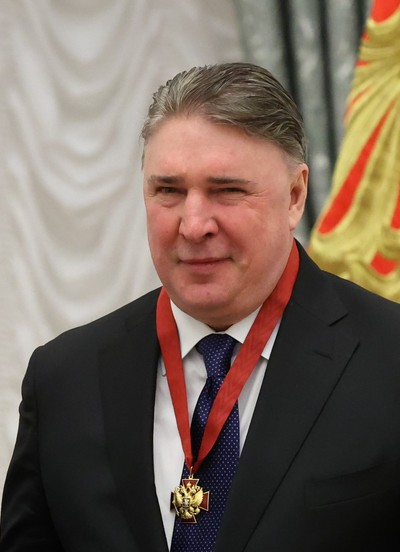
- Kasatonov in 2025
- Born: 14 October 1959 (age 67) Leningrad, Russian SFSR, Soviet Union
- Height: 6 ft 1 in (185 cm)
- Weight: 212 lb (96 kg; 15 st 2 lb)
- Position: Defence
- Shot: Left
- Played for: SKA Leningrad; CSKA Moscow; New Jersey Devils; Mighty Ducks of Anaheim; St. Louis Blues; Boston Bruins
- National team: Soviet Union
- NHL draft: 225th overall, 1983; New Jersey Devils
- Playing career: 1976–1997
Medal record
Men's ice hockey
Gold medal – first place	1984 Sarajevo	Team
Gold medal – first place	1988 Calgary	Team
Silver medal – second place	1980 Lake Placid	Team

Alexei Viktorovich Kasatonov (Russian: Алексей Викторович Касатонов; born 14 October 1959) is a Russian former ice hockey defenceman, who was a long-time member of the Soviet Union national ice hockey team. He was inducted into the IIHF Hall of Fame in 2009.

== Career ==
On the international stage, Kasatonov won two Olympic gold medals, in 1984 and 1988, and silver in 1980. He won an additional five gold medals at the World Championships in 1981, 1982, 1983, 1986 and 1989.

On the club level, Kasatonov played for SKA Leningrad, CSKA Moscow, New Jersey Devils, Mighty Ducks of Anaheim, St. Louis Blues, and Boston Bruins. He was Anaheim's lone representative in the 1994 National Hockey League All-Star Game. Following a shoulder injury in an American Hockey League (AHL) game for the Providence Bruins in 1996, Kasatonov retired from the NHL and returned to play one last season for his former club CSKA Moscow. The severity of the injury led Kasatonov to end his playing career, and he returned to New Jersey to settle down with his wife and son.

In 1998, Kasatonov was the general manager of the Russian Olympic Team that captured the silver medal in Nagano. After the Olympics he began training his son, and soon began coaching youth hockey in the Tri-State area, running his own weekly clinics in Staten Island for seven years. In 2003, Kasatonov founded the Admirals Hockey Club, which at its peak had five teams ranging from Squirts to Juniors. In 2004, Kasatonov accepted the head coaching position at Columbia University.

In 2008, Kasatonov returned to Russia for a head coaching position at PHC Krylya Sovetov. In 2010, Kasatonov was the vice president of CSKA Moscow. In 2011–12, Kasatonov became the vice president and general manager of SKA Saint Petersburg of the Kontinental Hockey League, the first club that he played for in the Soviet Union.

== Honours and awards ==
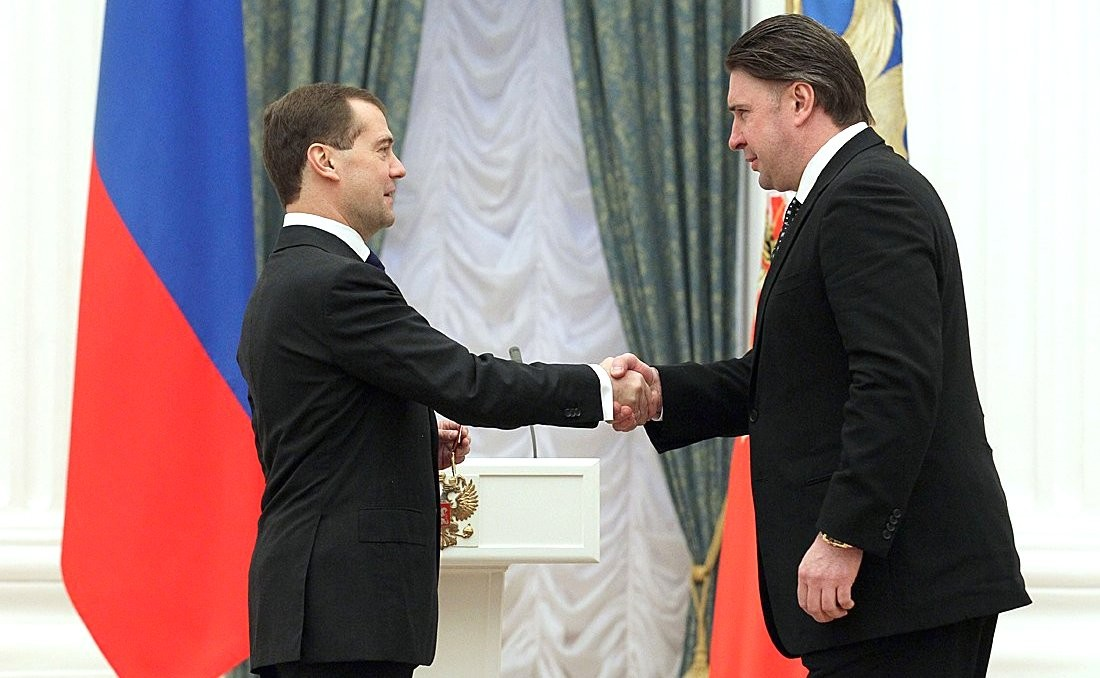
With Dmitry Medvedev at presentation of the Order "For Merit to the Fatherland", 4th class, 29 December 2011

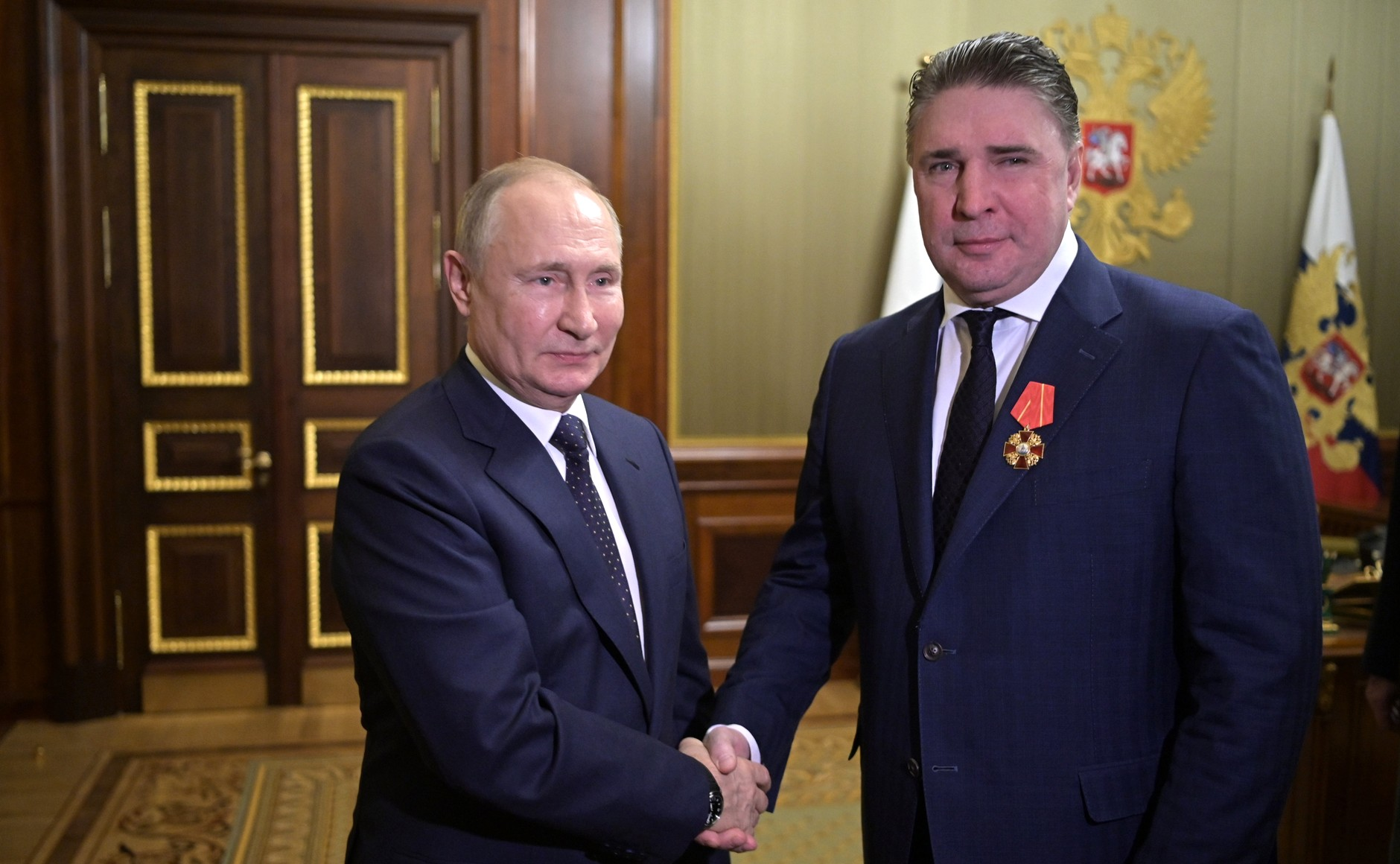
With Vladimir Putin at presentation of the Order of Alexander Nevsky, 29 December 2021

- IIHF Hall of Fame (inducted 2009)
- Order "For Merit to the Fatherland", 4th class
- Order of Honour
- Order of the Red Banner of Labour
- Order of the Badge of Honour
- Medal "For Distinguished Labour"
- NHL All-Star game (1994)

== Career statistics ==
=== Regular season and playoffs ===
			Regular season					Playoffs
Season	Team	League	GP	G	A	Pts	PIM	GP	G	A	Pts	PIM
1976–77	SKA Leningrad	Soviet	7	0	0	0	0	—	—	—	—	—
1977–78	SKA Leningrad	Soviet	35	4	7	11	15	—	—	—	—	—
1978–79	CSKA Moscow	Soviet	40	5	14	19	30	—	—	—	—	—
1979–80	CSKA Moscow	Soviet	37	5	8	13	26	—	—	—	—	—
1980–81	CSKA Moscow	Soviet	47	10	12	22	38	—	—	—	—	—
1981–82	CSKA Moscow	Soviet	46	12	27	39	45	—	—	—	—	—
1982–83	CSKA Moscow	Soviet	44	12	19	31	37	—	—	—	—	—
1983–84	CSKA Moscow	Soviet	39	12	24	36	20	—	—	—	—	—
1984–85	CSKA Moscow	Soviet	40	18	18	36	26	—	—	—	—	—
1985–86	CSKA Moscow	Soviet	40	6	17	23	27	—	—	—	—	—
1986–87	CSKA Moscow	Soviet	40	13	17	30	16	—	—	—	—	—
1987–88	CSKA Moscow	Soviet	43	8	12	20	8	—	—	—	—	—
1988–89	CSKA Moscow	Soviet	41	8	14	22	8	—	—	—	—	—
1989–90	CSKA Moscow	Soviet	30	6	7	13	6	—	—	—	—	—
1989–90	Utica Devils	AHL	3	0	2	2	7	—	—	—	—	—
1989–90	New Jersey Devils	NHL	39	6	15	21	16	6	0	3	3	14
1990–91	New Jersey Devils	NHL	78	10	31	41	76	7	1	3	4	8
1991–92	New Jersey Devils	NHL	76	12	28	40	70	7	1	1	2	12
1992–93	New Jersey Devils	NHL	64	3	14	17	57	4	0	0	0	0
1993–94	Mighty Ducks of Anaheim	NHL	55	4	18	22	43	—	—	—	—	—
1993–94	St. Louis Blues	NHL	8	0	2	2	19	4	2	0	2	2
1994–95	CSKA Moscow	IHL	9	2	3	5	6	—	—	—	—	—
1994–95	Boston Bruins	NHL	44	2	14	16	33	5	0	0	0	2
1995–96	Boston Bruins	NHL	19	1	0	1	12	—	—	—	—	—
1995–96	Providence Bruins	AHL	16	3	6	9	10	—	—	—	—	—
1996–97	CSKA Moscow	RSL	38	3	20	23	68	1	0	0	0	0
Soviet totals			529	119	196	315	312	—	—	—	—	—
NHL totals			383	38	122	160	326	33	4	7	11	40

=== International ===
Year	Team	Event	Place	GP	G	A	Pts	PIM
1977	Soviet Union	EJC	3rd place, bronze medalist(s)	6	3	1	4	6
1978	Soviet Union	WJC	1st place, gold medalist(s)	7	1	2	3	2
1979	Soviet Union	WJC	1st place, gold medalist(s)	6	3	4	7	6
1980	Soviet Union	OG	2nd place, silver medalist(s)	7	2	5	7	2
1981	Soviet Union	WC	1st place, gold medalist(s)	8	1	3	4	8
1981	Soviet Union	CC	1st place, gold medalist(s)	7	1	10	11	8
1982	Soviet Union	WC	1st place, gold medalist(s)	10	0	3	3	6
1983	Soviet Union	WC	1st place, gold medalist(s)	10	1	10	11	14
1984	Soviet Union	OG	1st place, gold medalist(s)	7	3	3	6	0
1984	Soviet Union	CC	SF	6	1	4	5	2
1985	Soviet Union	WC	3rd place, bronze medalist(s)	9	5	6	11	19
1986	Soviet Union	WC	1st place, gold medalist(s)	10	3	4	7	4
1987	Soviet Union	WC	3rd place, bronze medalist(s)	10	3	5	8	8
1987	Soviet Union	CC	F	9	1	4	5	4
1988	Soviet Union	OG	1st place, gold medalist(s)	7	2	6	8	0
1989	Soviet Union	WC	1st place, gold medalist(s)	10	2	0	2	2
1991	Soviet Union	WC	3rd place, bronze medalist(s)	10	3	3	6	8
1991	Soviet Union	CC	5th	5	0	1	1	6
Junior totals				19	7	7	14	14
Senior totals				125	28	67	95	97
