= Richie Dunn =

American ice hockey player (1957–2016)

- Born: May 12, 1957 Boston, Massachusetts, U.S.
- Died: September 20, 2016 (aged 59) Clarence, New York, U.S.
- Height: 6 ft 0 in (183 cm)
- Weight: 200 lb (91 kg; 14 st 4 lb)
- Position: Defense
- Shot: Left
- Played for: Buffalo Sabres; Calgary Flames; Hartford Whalers
- National team: United States
- NHL draft: Undrafted
- Playing career: 1977–1990

Richard Leo Dunn (May 12, 1957 – September 20, 2016) was an American professional ice hockey defenseman. He played in the National Hockey League with the Buffalo Sabres, Calgary Flames, and Hartford Whalers between 1977 and 1989. In his NHL career, Dunn appeared in 483 games and scored 36 goals and 140 assists.

He was also a member of the US national team at the 1981 Canada Cup and 1986 Ice Hockey World Championship tournaments. Dunn died on September 20, 2016, aged 59.

== Career statistics ==
=== Regular season and playoffs ===
			Regular season					Playoffs
Season	Team	League	GP	G	A	Pts	PIM	GP	G	A	Pts	PIM
1974–75	Kingston Canadians	OMJHL	51	0	1	1	0	—	—	—	—	—
1975–76	Kingston Canadians	OMJHL	61	7	18	25	62	—	—	—	—	—
1976–77	Windsor Spitfires	OMJHL	65	5	21	26	98	—	—	—	—	—
1977–78	Hershey Bears	AHL	54	7	22	29	17	—	—	—	—	—
1977–78	Buffalo Sabres	NHL	25	0	3	3	16	1	0	0	0	2
1978–79	Hershey Bears	AHL	34	5	18	23	10	4	0	1	1	4
1978–79	Buffalo Sabres	NHL	24	0	3	3	14	—	—	—	—	—
1979–80	Buffalo Sabres	NHL	80	7	31	38	61	14	2	8	10	8
1980–81	Buffalo Sabres	NHL	79	7	42	49	34	8	0	5	5	6
1981–82	Buffalo Sabres	NHL	72	7	19	26	73	4	0	1	1	0
1982–83	Calgary Flames	NHL	80	3	11	14	47	9	1	1	2	8
1983–84	Hartford Whalers	NHL	63	5	20	25	30	—	—	—	—	—
1984–85	Binghamton Whalers	AHL	64	9	39	48	43	8	2	2	4	8
1984–85	Hartford Whalers	NHL	13	1	4	5	2	—	—	—	—	—
1985–86	Rochester Americans	AHL	34	6	17	23	12	—	—	—	—	—
1985–86	Buffalo Sabres	NHL	29	4	5	9	25	—	—	—	—	—
1986–87	Rochester Americans	AHL	64	6	26	32	47	18	1	6	7	6
1986–87	Buffalo Sabres	NHL	2	0	1	1	2	—	—	—	—	—
1987–88	Rochester Americans	AHL	68	12	35	47	52	7	3	3	6	2
1987–88	Buffalo Sabres	NHL	12	2	0	2	8	—	—	—	—	—
1988–89	Rochester Americans	AHL	69	9	35	44	81	—	—	—	—	—
1988–89	Buffalo Sabres	NHL	4	0	1	1	2	—	—	—	—	—
1989–90	Rochester Americans	AHL	41	7	7	14	34	7	0	4	4	4
NHL totals			483	36	140	176	314	36	3	15	18	24

=== International ===
Year	Team	Event	GP	G	A	Pts	PIM
1977	United States	WJC	7	2	1	3	0
1981	United States	CC	6	1	3	4	4
1986	United States	WC	10	1	1	2	2
Junior totals			7	2	1	3	0
Senior totals			16	2	4	6	6
