= Sergei Shepelev =

Russian ice hockey player

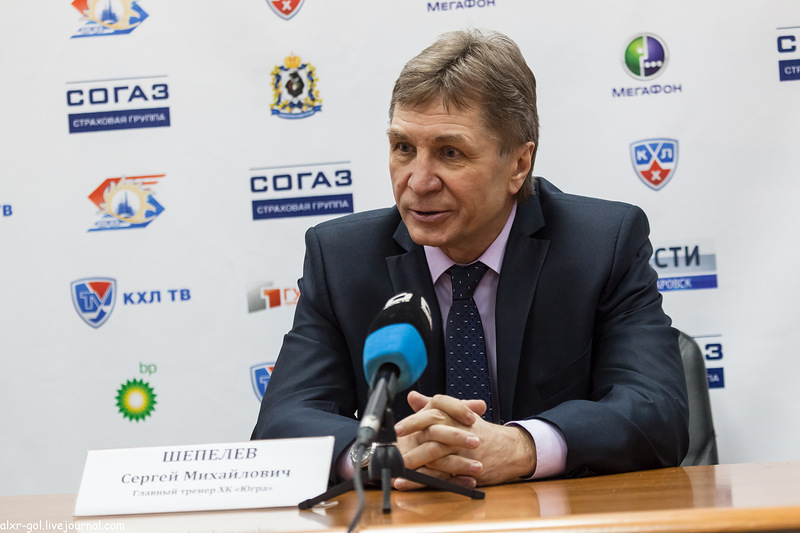
- Shepelev in 2013
- Born: October 13, 1955 (age 71) Nizhny Tagil, Russian SFSR, Soviet Union
- Position: Centre
- Shot: Left
- Played for: HC Spartak Moscow
- National team: Soviet Union
- Playing career: 1973–1988
Medal record
Olympic Games
Gold medal – first place	1984 Sarajevo	Ice hockey
World Championships
Gold medal – first place	1981 Sweden	Ice hockey
Gold medal – first place	1982 Finland	Ice hockey
Gold medal – first place	1983 West Germany	Ice hockey

Sergei Mikhailovich Shepelev (Russian: Сергей Михайлович Шепелев; born October 13, 1955, in Nizhny Tagil, Soviet Union) is a retired ice hockey player who played in the Soviet Hockey League. He played left wing for HC Spartak Moscow. Internationally, he was a member of the USSR national ice hockey team that won the 1981 Canada Cup and the gold medal at the 1984 Winter Olympics in Sarajevo. He was named to the 1981 Canada Cup All-Star Team. He was inducted into the Russian and Soviet Hockey Hall of Fame in 1981.

== Career statistics ==
=== Regular season and playoffs ===
			Regular season
Season	Team	League	GP	G	A	Pts	PIM
1973–74	Avtomobilist Sverdlovsk	USSR II	34	9	4	13	8
1974–75	SKA Sverdlovsk	USSR II	46	20	13	33	17
1975–76	SKA Sverdlovsk	USSR II	50	25	21	46	20
1976–77	Avtomobilist Sverdlovsk	USSR II	46	29	12	41	20
1977–78	Avtomobilist Sverdlovsk	USSR	34	20	7	27	13
1978–79	Avtomobilist Sverdlovsk	USSR	42	20	14	34	30
1979–80	Spartak Moscow	USSR	37	10	8	18	12
1980–81	Spartak Moscow	USSR	49	28	20	48	22
1981–82	Spartak Moscow	USSR	40	17	17	34	20
1982–83	Spartak Moscow	USSR	41	18	10	28	20
1983–84	Spartak Moscow	USSR	44	21	21	42	25
1984–85	Spartak Moscow	USSR	46	21	16	37	24
1985–86	Spartak Moscow	USSR	37	12	16	28	31
1986–87	Spartak Moscow	USSR	40	10	12	22	24
1987–88	Spartak Moscow	USSR	40	11	15	26	22
USSR II totals			176	83	50	133	65
USSR totals			450	188	156	344	243

=== International ===
Year	Team	Event	GP	G	A	Pts	PIM
1975	Soviet Union	WJC	—	0	0	0	—
1981	Soviet Union	WC	8	6	2	8	4
1981	Soviet Union	CC	7	6	2	8	4
1982	Soviet Union	WC	10	6	2	8	6
1983	Soviet Union	WC	10	2	4	6	6
1984	Soviet Union	OG	7	2	4	6	0
1984	Soviet Union	CC	5	0	3	3	0
Senior totals			47	22	17	39	20
