= Jörgen Pettersson (ice hockey) =

Swedish ice hockey player (born 1956)

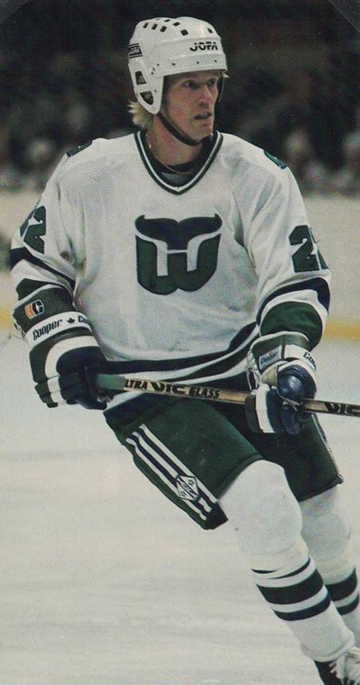
- Pettersson in 1985 card
- Born: 11 July 1956 (age 69) Gothenburg, Sweden
- Height: 6 ft 2 in (188 cm)
- Weight: 185 lb (84 kg; 13 st 3 lb)
- Position: Left wing
- Shot: Left
- Played for: St. Louis Blues; Hartford Whalers; Washington Capitals
- National team: Sweden
- NHL draft: Undrafted
- WHA draft: 115th overall, 1976; Winnipeg Jets
- Playing career: 1973–1991

Sven-Ove Jörgen Pettersson (born 11 July 1956) is a Swedish former professional ice hockey player. With Västra Frölunda IF, he won a silver medal in the 1979–80 Elitserien season. The 1988–89 season saw him qualifying for the Swedish Elite League.

After playing several seasons in Sweden with Västra Frölunda IF, he signed as a free agent in 1980 with the St. Louis Blues. Known as "The Handsome Swede" by Blues supporters, Petterson made an impact as an excellent first-line forward alongside Bernie Federko and Brian Sutter, setting the team record for points as a rookie with 73. Pettersson played five seasons with the Blues before being traded with Mike Liut to the Hartford Whalers for net minder Greg Millen and forward Mark Johnson on February 21, 1985. During the 1985–86 NHL season he was traded to the Washington Capitals in exchange for Doug Jarvis. Pettersson returned to Sweden to play for Frölunda, where he retired in 1991.

== Career statistics ==
=== Regular season and playoffs ===
			Regular season					Playoffs
Season	Team	League	GP	G	A	Pts	PIM	GP	G	A	Pts	PIM
1973–74	Västra Frölunda IF	SWE	28	3	5	8	4	—	—	—	—	—
1974–75	Västra Frölunda IF	SWE	29	19	3	22	4	—	—	—	—	—
1975–76	Västra Frölunda IF	SWE	29	18	8	26	6	—	—	—	—	—
1976–77	Västra Frölunda IF	SWE	19	15	4	19	4	—	—	—	—	—
1977–78	Västra Frölunda IF	SWE	16	5	8	13	8	—	—	—	—	—
1978–79	Västra Frölunda IF	SWE	35	23	11	34	12	—	—	—	—	—
1979–80	Västra Frölunda IF	SWE	33	17	15	32	18	8	4	4	8	8
1980–81	St. Louis Blues	NHL	62	37	36	73	24	11	4	3	7	0
1981–82	St. Louis Blues	NHL	77	38	31	69	28	7	1	2	3	0
1982–83	St. Louis Blues	NHL	74	35	38	73	4	4	1	1	2	0
1983–84	St. Louis Blues	NHL	77	28	34	62	29	11	7	3	10	2
1984–85	St. Louis Blues	NHL	75	23	32	55	20	3	1	1	2	0
1985–86	Hartford Whalers	NHL	23	5	5	10	2	—	—	—	—	—
1985–86	Washington Capitals	NHL	47	8	16	24	10	8	1	2	3	2
1986–87	Västra Frölunda HC	SWE-2	27	14	13	27	10	—	—	—	—	—
1987–88	Västra Frölunda HC	SWE-2	35	22	21	43	18	—	—	—	—	—
1988–89	Västra Frölunda HC	SWE-2	36	23	30	53	10	—	—	—	—	—
1989–90	Västra Frölunda HC	SWE	36	13	11	24	16	—	—	—	—	—
1990–91	Västra Frölunda HC	SWE	1	0	0	0	0	—	—	—	—	—
1990–91	Hanhals HF	SWE-2	29	16	19	35	18	—	—	—	—	—
1993–94	Härryda HC	SWE-3	32	31	34	65	16	—	—	—	—	—
1994–95	Kungsbacka HC	SWE-3	8	4	7	11	8	—	—	—	—	—
SWE totals			226	113	65	178	72	8	4	4	8	8
NHL totals			435	174	192	366	117	44	15	12	27	4

=== International ===
Year	Team	Event	GP	G	A	Pts	PIM
1975	Sweden	EJC	5	3	2	5	0
1975	Sweden	WJC	—	—	—	—	—
1976	Sweden	WJC	4	1	2	3	0
1981	Sweden	CC	5	0	0	0	0
1983	Sweden	WC	10	2	0	2	4
Senior totals			15	2	0	2	4
