= Jiří Dudáček =

Czech ice hockey player (born 1962)

- Born: April 4, 1962 (age 64) Kladno, Czechoslovakia
- Height: 5 ft 9 in (175 cm)
- Weight: 170 lb (77 kg; 12 st 2 lb)
- Position: Right wing
- Shot: Left
- Played for: HK Kralupy nad Vltavou (Czech-3); ETC Crimmitschau (Ger-3; HC Kladno (CSK); HC Dukla Jihlava (CSK)
- National team: Czechoslovakia
- NHL draft: 17th overall, 1981; Buffalo Sabres
- Playing career: 1978–1991; 1994–1995; 1999–2000

Jiří Dudáček (born April 4, 1962) is a former professional ice hockey right wing. He was drafted in the first round, 17th overall, by the Buffalo Sabres in the 1981 NHL entry draft, making him the first Czechoslovak player to be selected in the first round of a National Hockey League draft. Dudáček was a star for the Czechoslovak team at the World Junior Ice Hockey Championships in 1980 and 1981, and was considered by many NHL scouts to be the top junior prospect in the 1981 draft class.

As Czechoslovakia was a Communist country at the time of Dudáček's drafting, bringing him to North America was a difficult proposition for the Sabres organization. Dudáček's father was also a high-ranking Communist party member.

While other teams helped Czechoslovak players sneak out of their homeland to come to the NHL, Sabres general manager Scotty Bowman attempted to convince Czechoslovak officials to legally allow Dudáček to come to Buffalo. All efforts were declined by the Czechoslovak sports authorities, though, claiming Dudáček was "too young" to leave the country.

== Playing career ==
Dudáček played for the Czechoslovak national ice hockey team in the 1981 and 1984 Canada Cups. He was among Czechoslovakia's leading scorers in 1981, tallying four goals and two assists in six games. In 1984, he went scoreless in four games.

Dudáček never made it to North America to play for the Sabres organization. Instead, he spent his career playing for HC Kladno and HC Jihlava in the Czechoslovak Extraliga, until his retirement in 1991.

== Career statistics ==
=== Regular season and playoffs ===
			Regular season					Playoffs
Season	Team	League	GP	G	A	Pts	PIM	GP	G	A	Pts	PIM
1978–79	Poldi SONP Kladno	TCH	4	0	0	0	2	—	—	—	—	—
1979–80	Poldi SONP Kladno	TCH	41	18	13	31	6	—	—	—	—	—
1980–81	Poldi SONP Kladno	TCH	32	12	14	26	8	—	—	—	—	—
1981–82	Poldi SONP Kladno	TCH	36	13	19	32	18	—	—	—	—	—
1982–83	Poldi SONP Kladno	TCH	23	9	6	15	12	—	—	—	—	—
1983–84	ASD Dukla Jihlava	TCH	39	14	4	18	10	—	—	—	—	—
1984–85	ASD Dukla Jihlava	TCH	42	13	13	26	36	—	—	—	—	—
1985–86	Poldi SONP Kladno	TCH	28	12	10	22	28	—	—	—	—	—
1986–87	Poldi SONP Kladno	CZE II	24	19	20	39	9	6	8	9	17	4
1987–88	Poldi SONP Kladno	TCH	39	23	28	51	33	—	—	—	—	—
1988–89	Poldi SONP Kladno	TCH	34	13	19	32	22	—	—	—	—	—
1989–90	Poldi SONP Kladno	TCH	53	11	17	28	54	—	—	—	—	—
1990–91	Poldi SONP Kladno	TCH	43	11	14	25	24	—	—	—	—	—
1991–92	Épinal Écureuils	FRA I / FRA II	21	20	24	44	4	—	—	—	—	—
1994–95	ETC Crimmitschau	DEU III	3	1	1	2	0	—	—	—	—	—
1999–2000	HK Kralupy nad Vltavou	CZE III	4	0	0	0	8	—	—	—	—	—
TCH totals			414	149	157	306	253	—	—	—	—	—

=== International ===
Year	Team	Event	GP	G	A	Pts	PIM
1979	Czechoslovakia	EJC
1980	Czechoslovakia	EJC	5	7	1	8	6
1980	Czechoslovakia	WJC	5	0	0	0	2
1981	Czechoslovakia	WJC	4	2	1	3	0
1981	Czechoslovakia	CC	6	4	2	6	4
1982	Czechoslovakia	WJC	7	5	5	10	2
1984	Czechoslovakia	CC	3	0	0	0	0
Junior totals			21	14	7	21	10
Senior totals			9	4	2	6	4

Preceded by Steve Patrick	Buffalo Sabres first-round draft pick 1981	Succeeded by Phil Housley
