= Karel Lang =

Czech ice hockey player

- Born: 9 June 1958 (age 68) Brno, Czechoslovakia
- Height: 5 ft 9 in (175 cm)
- Weight: 165 lb (75 kg; 11 st 11 lb)
- Position: Goaltender
- Caught: Left
- Played for: TJ Zetor Brno; HK Dukla Trenčín; Krefeld Pinguine; Füchse Duisburg
- National team: Czechoslovakia
- Playing career: 1978–2001; 2006–2007

Karel Lang (born 9 June 1958) is a Czech former professional ice hockey goaltender.

== Career ==
He represented Czechoslovakia in the 1980 Winter Olympics, where his team finished 5th in the rankings. Between 1990 and 2001 he played for the Krefeld Pinguine in the Eishockey-Bundesliga and the Deutsche Eishockey Liga.

== Family ==
Lang's son Lukas Lang also played professionally in Germany.
