= Anders Parmström =

Swedish ice hockey player and coach

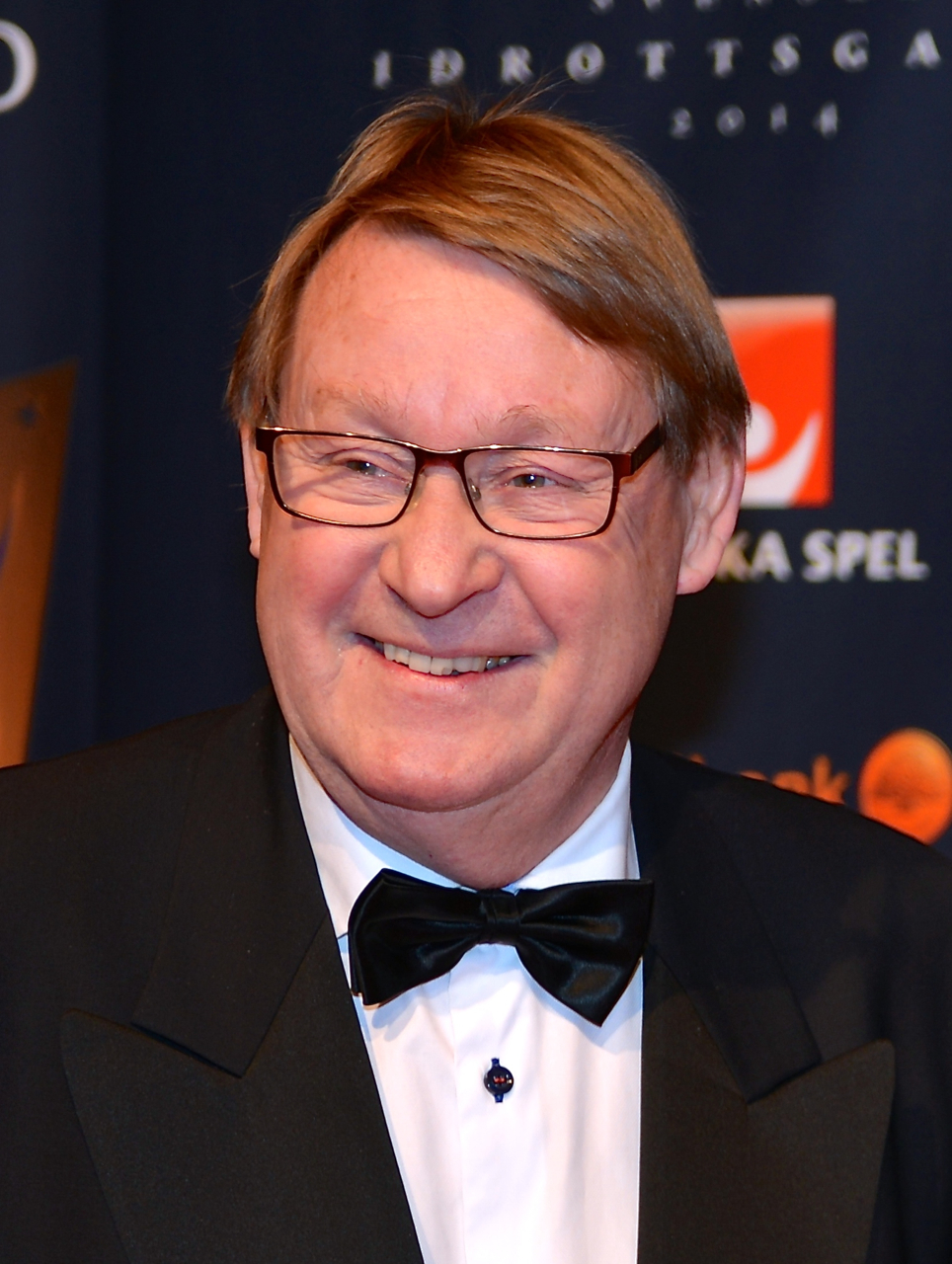
- Anders Parmström during the Swedish Sports Awards inside the Stockholm Globe Arena in January 2014
- Born: 16 February 1942 (age 83); Stockholm, Sweden
- Position: Forward
- Played for: AIK
- Playing career: 1959–1970

Anders "Ankan" Parmström (born 16 February 1942) is a Swedish former ice hockey player and coach, who currently serves as an ice hockey expert analyst on the Canal Plus television network in Sweden.

Parmström served as coach of AIK in the Swedish Elitserien hockey league for eight seasons before coaching the Swedish national team between 1981-1984. As an active player, he represented AIK IF during the 1960-70 season.

"Ankan" (the Duck) Parmström is a familiar profile on Swedish TV, having worked as a hockey colour commentator for both Swedish Canal+ and SVT. He also provided Swedish language commentary for the computer game NHL 06.
