= 1982 Ice Hockey World Championships =

1982 edition of the World Ice Hockey Championships

Tournament details
- Host country: Finland
- Venues: 2 (in 2 host cities)
- Dates: 15–29 April
- Teams: 8

Final positions
- Champions: Soviet Union (18th title)
- Runners-up: Czechoslovakia
- Third place: Canada
- Fourth place: Sweden

Tournament statistics
- Games played: 34
- Goals scored: 249 (7.32 per game)
- Attendance: 193,224 (5,683 per game)
- Scoring leader: (Canada) Wayne Gretzky 14 points

The 1982 Ice Hockey World Championships took place in Finland from the 15 April to the 29 April. The games were played in Helsinki and Tampere with eight teams playing a single round-robin, followed by the top four teams playing each other once more. This was the 48th World Championships, and also the 59th European Championships of ice hockey. The Soviet Union became World Champions for the 18th time, and also won their 21st European Championship.

The tournament is notable since Canada, reinforced by Wayne Gretzky after the Edmonton Oilers were shockingly knocked out of the Stanley Cup playoffs by Los Angeles, would have won the silver medal if the Soviet team had beaten Czechoslovakia in the final game. However, the teams played to a scoreless tie, knocking the Canadians down to the bronze; this led to speculation that the Soviets and Czechs had played to a draw on purpose. Gretzky did score more points than any other player in the tournament (14), in his only appearance at the World Championships, but the Soviet Union's Viktor Shalimov was selected as "Best Forward".

Other notable events include the Czechs' loss to West Germany for the first time in forty-five years, since being beaten in triple overtime to then-Nazi Germany in 1937. The Italians (with a squad boasting seventeen Italian Canadians), beat the Americans and became the first promoted team to survive relegation since the tournament expanded to eight teams in 1959. The tourney was a disaster for the Americans; just two years after winning gold at the 1980 Winter Olympics, they lost every game but one, a tie with West Germany on the final day. The U.S. was thus relegated to Group B for 1983 (they won that tourney and were promoted in 1984 to the top group, where they have been ever since).

Organization of the tournament was overseen by Kalervo Kummola, the chief executive officer of SM-liiga.

== World Championship Group A (Finland) ==
=== First round ===
Pos	Team	Pld	W	D	L	GF	GA	GD	Pts
1	Soviet Union	7	7	0	0	48	16	+32	14
2	Czechoslovakia	7	4	1	2	33	14	+19	9
3	Sweden	7	3	3	1	24	22	+2	9
4	Canada	7	3	2	2	32	22	+10	8
5	Finland	7	3	1	3	21	31	−10	7
6	West Germany	7	2	1	4	19	30	−11	5
7	Italy	7	1	1	5	20	44	−24	3
8	United States	7	0	1	6	21	39	−18	1

The United States was relegated to Group B.

15 April	Canada	9–2	Finland

15 April	West Germany	4–2	Czechoslovakia

15 April	Soviet Union	9–2	Italy

15 April	Sweden	4–2	United States

16 April	Czechoslovakia	6–2	Canada

16 April	Italy	7–5	United States

16 April	Finland	4–3	West Germany

16 April	Soviet Union	7–3	Sweden

18 April	Canada	3–3	Sweden

18 April	West Germany	5–2	Italy

18 April	Soviet Union	5–3	Czechoslovakia

18 April	Finland	4–2	United States

19 April	Canada	7–1	West Germany

19 April	Sweden	5–3	Italy

19 April	Czechoslovakia	6–0	United States

19 April	Soviet Union	8–1	Finland

21 April	Canada	3–3	Italy

21 April	Sweden	3–1	West Germany

21 April	Soviet Union	8–4	United States

21 April	Czechoslovakia	3–0	Finland

22 April	Canada	5–3	United States

22 April	Soviet Union	7–0	West Germany

22 April	Finland	7–3	Italy

22 April	Czechoslovakia	3–3	Sweden

24 April	Soviet Union	4–3	Canada

24 April	Czechoslovakia	10–0	Italy

24 April	Finland	3–3	Sweden

24 April	West Germany	5–5	United States

=== Final round ===
Pos	Team	Pld	W	D	L	GF	GA	GD	Pts
1	Soviet Union	10	9	1	0	58	20	+38	19
2	Czechoslovakia	10	5	2	3	38	20	+18	12
3	Canada	10	5	2	3	46	30	+16	12
4	Sweden	10	3	3	4	26	35	−9	9

25 April	Soviet Union	6–4	Canada

25 April	Czechoslovakia	3–2	Sweden

27 April	Canada	4–2	Czechoslovakia

27 April	Soviet Union	4–0	Sweden

29 April	Canada	6–0	Sweden

29 April	Soviet Union	0–0	Czechoslovakia

== World Championship Group B (Austria) ==
Played in Klagenfurt, Austria from March 18–27. Like the finals of Group A, the Group B tournament also ended in controversy. After the Chinese had defeated the Dutch (relegating them), China would also avoid relegation -- unless Romania and Switzerland played to a tie. They did just that (3-3) on March 27, in a match derided as a "scandalous parody" by some observers; Romania thus finished with three head-to-head points, Switzerland two, and China one, relegating the Chinese.

Pos	Team	Pld	W	D	L	GF	GA	GD	Pts
9	East Germany	7	6	1	0	48	25	+23	13
10	Austria	7	4	1	2	33	26	+7	9
11	Poland	7	4	1	2	42	23	+19	9
12	Norway	7	3	0	4	24	43	−19	6
13	Romania	7	2	1	4	27	30	−3	5
14	Switzerland	7	1	3	3	20	27	−7	5
15	China	7	2	1	4	32	47	−15	5
16	Netherlands	7	2	0	5	22	27	−5	4

East Germany was promoted to Group A, and both China and the Netherlands were relegated.

18 March	East Germany	10–1	Norway

18 March	Switzerland	3–2	Poland

18 March	Romania	5–2	Netherlands

18 March	Austria	5–2	China

19 March	East Germany	13–7	China

19 March	Austria	7–1	Romania

20 March	Switzerland	4–5	Norway

20 March	Poland	3–2	Netherlands

21 March	China	4–2	Norway

21 March	Switzerland	2–4	East Germany

21 March	Poland	5–1	Romania

21 March	Austria	1–4	Netherlands

22 March	Romania	9–3	China

22 March	Austria	4–7	East Germany

23 March	Netherlands	6–1	Switzerland

23 March	Norway	3–12	Poland

24 March	Switzerland	4–4	China

24 March	East Germany	3–1	Netherlands

24 March	Norway	3–2	Romania

24 March	Austria	6–5	Poland

26 March	East Germany	7–6	Romania

26 March	Poland	11–4	China

26 March	Netherlands	4–6	Norway

26 March	Austria	3–3	Switzerland

27 March	China	8–3	Netherlands

27 March	Switzerland	3–3	Romania

27 March	East Germany	4–4	Poland

27 March	Austria	7–4	Norway

== World Championship Group C (Spain) ==
Played in Jaca March 19–28.

Pos	Team	Pld	W	D	L	GF	GA	GD	Pts
17	Japan	7	7	0	0	70	14	+56	14
18	Yugoslavia	7	5	0	2	59	22	+37	10
19	Denmark	7	4	1	2	35	20	+15	9
20	France	7	4	0	3	47	30	+17	8
21	Hungary	7	4	0	3	43	29	+14	8
22	Bulgaria	7	2	1	4	29	30	−1	5
23	Spain	7	1	0	6	26	50	−24	2
24	South Korea	7	0	0	7	13	127	−114	0

Both Japan and Yugoslavia were promoted to Group B.

19 March	Japan	7–5	Yugoslavia

19 March	France	4–2	Bulgaria

19 March	Denmark	2–1	Hungary

19 March	Spain	15–3	South Korea

20 March	France	7–3	Hungary

20 March	Spain	0–6	Yugoslavia

21 March	Bulgaria	14–1	South Korea

21 March	Denmark	4–5	Japan

22 March	Hungary	5–4	Yugoslavia

22 March	France	20–4	South Korea

22 March	Bulgaria	2–2	Denmark

22 March	Spain	2–11	Japan

23 March	Yugoslavia	21–2	South Korea

23 March	Spain	1–8	Hungary

24 March	Japan	6–0	Bulgaria

24 March	Denmark	4–1	France

25 March	Yugoslavia	7–2	Denmark

25 March	Hungary	18–2	South Korea

25 March	Japan	6–2	France

25 March	Spain	3–7	Bulgaria

27 March	Spain	3–7	Denmark

27 March	Yugoslavia	9–5	France

27 March	Hungary	7–3	Bulgaria

27 March	Japan	25–0	South Korea

28 March	Denmark	14–1	South Korea

28 March	Japan	10–1	Hungary

28 March	Yugoslavia	7–1	Bulgaria

28 March	Spain	2–8	France

== Ranking ==
1982 IIHF World Championship winners

Soviet Union
18th title

=== Tournament Awards ===
- Best players selected by the directorate:
  - Best Goaltender: (Czechoslovakia) Jiří Králík
  - Best Defenceman: (Soviet Union) Viacheslav Fetisov
  - Best Forward: (Soviet Union) Viktor Shalimov
- Media All-Star Team:
  - Goaltender: (Czechoslovakia) Jiří Králík
  - Defence: (Soviet Union) Viacheslav Fetisov, (Soviet Union) Alexei Kasatonov
  - Forwards: (Canada) Bill Barber, (Canada) Wayne Gretzky, (Soviet Union) Sergei Makarov

=== Final standings ===
The final standings of the tournament according to IIHF:

1st place, gold medalist(s)	Soviet Union
2nd place, silver medalist(s)	Czechoslovakia
3rd place, bronze medalist(s)	Canada
4	Sweden
5	Finland
6	West Germany
7	Italy
8	United States

=== European championships final standings ===
The final standings of the European championships according to IIHF:

1st place, gold medalist(s)	Soviet Union
2nd place, silver medalist(s)	Sweden
3rd place, bronze medalist(s)	Czechoslovakia
4	Finland
5	West Germany
6	Italy

=== Scoring leaders ===
List shows the top skaters sorted by points, then goals.

Player	G	A	Pts	PIM	POS
(Canada) Wayne Gretzky	6	8	14	8	F
(Soviet Union) Viktor Shalimov	8	5	13	4	F
(Soviet Union) Sergei Makarov	6	7	13	8	F
(Soviet Union) Sergei Kapustin	3	9	12	8	F
(Soviet Union) Igor Larionov	4	6	10	2	F
(Canada) Bill Barber	8	1	9	18	F
(Czechoslovakia) Jiri Lala	6	3	9	8	F
(Soviet Union) Vladimir Golikov	4	5	9	6	F
(Soviet Union) Sergei Shepelev	6	2	8	6	F
(Czechoslovakia) Jindrich Kokrment	5	3	8	8	F
