= Vladimír Martinec =

Czech ice hockey player and coach

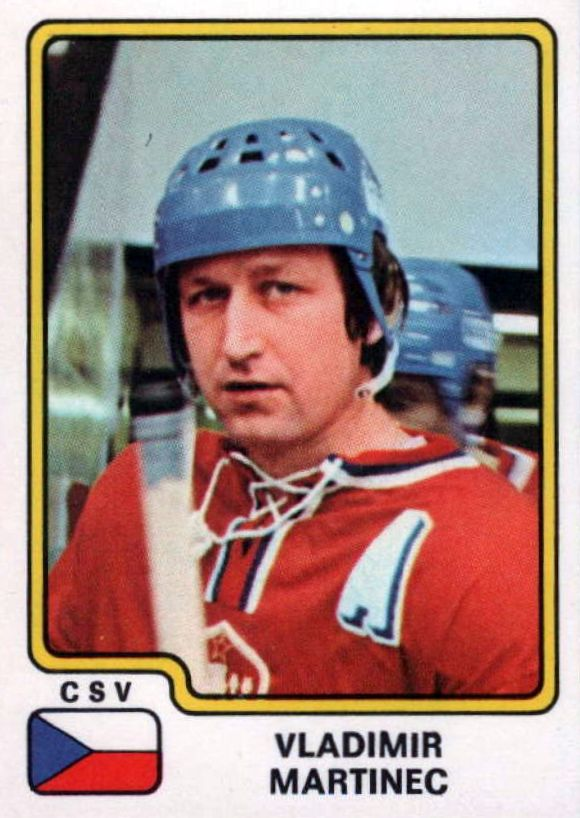
- Born: 22 December 1949 (age 76) Lomnice nad Popelkou, Czechoslovakia
- Height: 5 ft 9 in (175 cm)
- Weight: 183 lb (83 kg; 13 st 1 lb)
- Position: Right wing
- Played for: HC Pardubice; ESV Kaufbeuren
- National team: Czechoslovakia
- Playing career: 1968–1985
Medal record
Men's ice hockey
Representing Czechoslovakia
Olympic Games
| Silver medal – second place | 1976 Innsbruck | Team |
| Bronze medal – third place | 1972 Sapporo | Team |

Vladimír Martinec (born 22 December 1949) is a Czech former ice hockey player. He played as a right winger during the 1970s and early 1980s, and won the Golden Hockey Stick award as top player in Czechoslovakia four times, in 1973, 1975, 1976, and 1979. Internationally, he played for the Czechoslovakia men's national ice hockey team, and was inducted into the IIHF Hall of Fame in 2001.

== Career ==
Martinec played for Pardubice in the Czechoslovak Elite League from 1967 to 1981 with the exception of the 1978–79 season, when he played for Jihlava. Nicknamed "the Fox" due to the unpredictability of his offensive manoeuvres, he scored 343 goals in 539 games in the elite league.

Martinec was a key player on the Czechoslovak national teams in the 1970s. Known for his technical skills, he scored 155 goals in 289 international games. He played in the World Championships every year in the 1970s and in 1981 (on the winning side in 1972, 1976, and 1977, and making the all-star team in 1974, 1975, 1976, and 1977); he is the 7th all-time leading scorer in World Championships with 110 points (52 goals and 58 assists) in 102 games (top scorer in 1976 with 20 points in 10 games).

He also played for Czechoslovakia in the 1972, 1976, and 1980 Winter Olympics, and in the 1976 Canada Cup where he scored 7 points (3+4) in 7 games.

He coached ESV Kaufbeuren in Germany (also coming back to play for this team in 1985), and then coached his old team Tesla Pardubice between 1986 and 1989.

== Achievements and awards ==
- IIHF World Championships
  - 3-time world champion (1972,1976,1977)
  - 4-time all-star right wing (1974–1977)
  - Top scorer and best forward in 1976
- IIHF Hall of Fame (2001)
- Izvestia Cup: Top scorer and best forward in 1979
- Czechoslovak Elite League
  - On championship team (Pardubice) in 1973
  - Top goal-scorer in 1979 (42 goals)
  - 4-time winner of Golden Hockey Stick (Top player award); 1973, 1975, 1976, 1979

== Career statistics ==
=== Regular season and playoffs ===
| | | | Regular season | | | | | Playoffs |
| Season | Team | League | GP | G | A | Pts | PIM | GP | G | A | Pts | PIM |
|---|---|---|---|---|---|---|---|---|---|---|---|---|
| 1967–68 | TJ Tesla Pardubice | TCH |
| 1968–69 | TJ Tesla Pardubice | TCH | | 23 |
| 1969–70 | TJ Tesla Pardubice | TCH | 34 | 22 | 14 | 36 | — | — | — | — | — | — |
| 1970–71 | TJ Tesla Pardubice | TCH | 34 | 20 | 19 | 39 | — | — | — | — | — | — |
| 1971–72 | TJ Tesla Pardubice | TCH | 36 | 23 | 19 | 42 | 21 | — | — | — | — | — |
| 1972–73 | TJ Tesla Pardubice | TCH | 34 | 26 | 23 | 49 | — | — | — | — | — | — |
| 1973–74 | TJ Tesla Pardubice | TCH | 40 | 31 | 22 | 53 | — | — | — | — | — | — |
| 1974–75 | TJ Tesla Pardubice | TCH | 42 | 27 | 18 | 45 | — | — | — | — | — | — |
| 1975–76 | TJ Tesla Pardubice | TCH | 32 | 23 | 28 | 51 | — | — | — | — | — | — |
| 1976–77 | TJ Tesla Pardubice | TCH | 42 | 28 | 21 | 49 | — | — | — | — | — | — |
| 1977–78 | TJ Tesla Pardubice | TCH | 44 | 19 | 18 | 37 | 19 | — | — | — | — | — |
| 1978–79 | ASD Dukla Jihlava | TCH | 21 | 21 | 8 | 29 | — | — | — | — | — | — |
| 1978–79 | TJ Tesla Pardubice | TCH | 24 | 21 | 12 | 33 | — | — | — | — | — | — |
| 1979–80 | TJ Tesla Pardubice | TCH | 35 | 27 | 20 | 47 | 19 | — | — | — | — | — |
| 1980–81 | TJ Tesla Pardubice | TCH | 39 | 21 | 22 | 43 | 28 | — | — | — | — | — |
| 1981–82 | ESV Kaufbeuren | 1.GBun | 44 | 38 | 29 | 67 | 10 | 3 | 1 | 2 | 3 | 0 |
| 1982–83 | ESV Kaufbeuren | 1.GBun | 35 | 28 | 28 | 56 | 22 | — | — | — | — | — |
| 1983–84 | ESV Kaufbeuren | 1.GBun | 48 | 30 | 30 | 60 | 12 | — | — | — | — | — |
| 1984–85 | ESV Kaufbeuren | 1.GBun | 36 | 25 | 33 | 58 | 19 | 9 | 5 | 3 | 8 | 4 |
| TCH totals | | | 457 | 309 | 244 | 553 | — | — | — | — | — | — |
| 1.GBun totals | | | 163 | 121 | 120 | 241 | 63 | 12 | 6 | 5 | 11 | 4 |

- TCH totals do not include numbers from the 1967–68 to 1968–69 seasons.

=== International ===
| Year | Team | Event | GP | G | A | Pts | PIM |
|---|---|---|---|---|---|---|---|
| 1968 | Czechoslovakia | EJC | 5 | 4 | 4 | 8 | 4 |
| 1970 | Czechoslovakia | WC | 6 | 3 | 0 | 3 | 6 |
| 1971 | Czechoslovakia | WC | 10 | 2 | 3 | 5 | 0 |
| 1972 | Czechoslovakia | OLY | 6 | 4 | 2 | 6 | 0 |
| 1972 | Czechoslovakia | WC | 10 | 4 | 7 | 11 | 6 |
| 1973 | Czechoslovakia | WC | 8 | 1 | 5 | 6 | 8 |
| 1974 | Czechoslovakia | WC | 10 | 9 | 6 | 15 | 12 |
| 1975 | Czechoslovakia | WC | 9 | 7 | 4 | 11 | 4 |
| 1976 | Czechoslovakia | OLY | 6 | 7 | 5 | 12 | 2 |
| 1976 | Czechoslovakia | WC | 10 | 9 | 11 | 20 | 2 |
| 1976 | Czechoslovakia | CC | 7 | 3 | 4 | 7 | 2 |
| 1977 | Czechoslovakia | WC | 10 | 6 | 10 | 16 | 4 |
| 1978 | Czechoslovakia | WC | 10 | 4 | 4 | 8 | 0 |
| 1979 | Czechoslovakia | WC | 7 | 5 | 3 | 8 | 2 |
| 1980 | Czechoslovakia | OLY | 2 | 1 | 1 | 2 | 0 |
| 1981 | Czechoslovakia | WC | 8 | 3 | 5 | 8 | 0 |
| Junior totals | | | 5 | 4 | 4 | 8 | 4 |
| Senior totals | | | 119 | 68 | 70 | 138 | 48 |

Awards
| Preceded by Ivan Hlinka | Golden Hockey Stick; 1979 | Succeeded by Peter Šťastný |
| Preceded by Jiří Holeček | Golden Hockey Stick; 1975, 1976 | Succeeded by Milan Nový |
| Preceded by František Pospíšil | Golden Hockey Stick; 1973 | Succeeded by Jiří Holeček |
