= Ivan Hlinka =

Czech ice hockey player and coach (1950–2004)

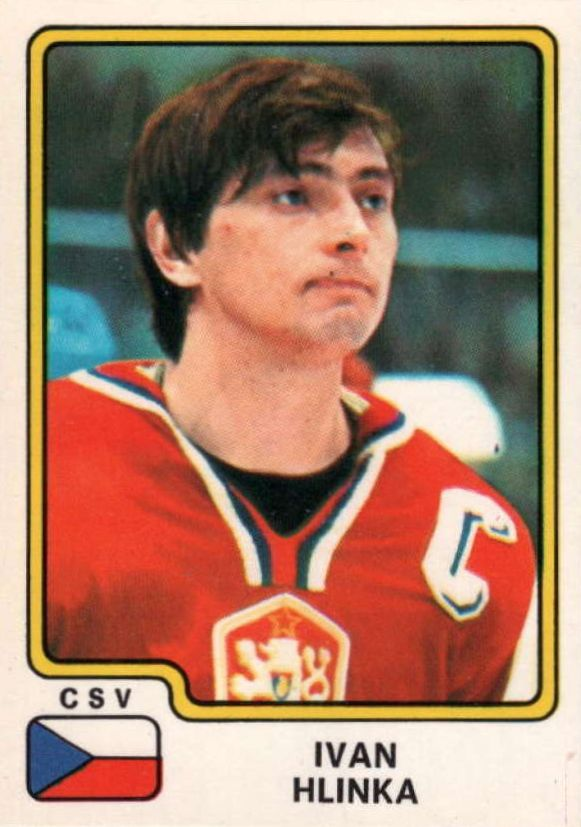
- Born: January 26, 1950 Most, Czechoslovakia
- Died: August 16, 2004 (aged 54) Karlovy Vary, Czech Republic
- Height: 6 ft 2 in (188 cm)
- Weight: 220 lb (100 kg; 15 st 10 lb)
- Position: Centre
- Shot: Left
- Played for: HC Litvínov; EV Zug; Vancouver Canucks; Dukla Trenčín
- National team: Czechoslovakia
- NHL draft: Undrafted
- Playing career: 1966–1987
Medal record
Men's ice hockey
Representing Czechoslovakia
Olympic Games
| Bronze medal – third place | 1972 Sapporo | Team |
| Silver medal – second place | 1976 Innsbruck | Team |
World Championships
| Silver medal – second place | 1971 Berne/Geneva | Team |
| Gold medal – first place | 1972 Prague | Team |
| Bronze medal – third place | 1973 Moscow | Team |
| Silver medal – second place | 1974 Helsinki | Team |
| Silver medal – second place | 1975 Munich/Düsseldorf | Team |
| Gold medal – first place | 1976 Katowice | Team |
| Gold medal – first place | 1977 Vienna | Team |
| Silver medal – second place | 1978 Prague | Team |
| Silver medal – second place | 1979 Moscow | Team |
| Bronze medal – third place | 1981 Gothenburg/Stockholm | Team |

Ivan Hlinka (January 26, 1950 – August 16, 2004) was a Czech professional ice hockey player and coach. He is considered to be one of the most important figures in Czech ice hockey history. A big centre, his playing style was comparable to Phil Esposito, often scoring with shots from the slot. He played most of his career with HC Litvínov and spent two seasons in the National Hockey League with the Vancouver Canucks. Internationally, Hlinka played for the Czechoslovakia men's national ice hockey team and was inducted into the IIHF Hall of Fame in 2002. After retiring as a player, he turned to coaching, leading the Czech national team to gold at the 1998 Winter Olympics in Nagano and spending two seasons with the Pittsburgh Penguins. His legacy includes the Ivan Hlinka Memorial Tournament for national under-18 hockey teams, and the Ivan Hlinka Stadion.

== Playing career ==
Hlinka began to play ice hockey at a young age. When he was six years old, he was playing HC Litvínov's youth team. He played in Czechoslovak league for the first time when he was 16.

At age 20, he became a captain of Litvínov's men's team and played in the Czechoslovak national team for the first time. He played 256 games as a member of the Czechoslovak national team and scored 132 goals in international games. He also played in 544 games in the Czechoslovak league and scored 347 times. Hlinka was named the Golden Hockey Stick winner as the country's top player in 1978.

Hlinka helped the Czechoslovak team to win world titles in 1972, 1976, and 1977. As a member of the Czechoslovak team, he won an Olympic bronze medal in 1972 and a silver medal in 1976.

Hlinka played in the inaugural Canada Cup tournament in 1976, the international tournament in which the best available players competed for their countries (most notably, players from the National Hockey League). Canada defeated Czechoslovakia in the best-of-three final two games to nothing, with scores of 6–0 and 5–4. The following year, he was named the national team's captain, a position he held from 1977 to 1980.

In 1981, Hlinka and fellow Czech Jiří Bubla joined the NHL's Vancouver Canucks. This started the Czech migration to the NHL. They were the first Czechoslovak players to compete in the NHL with the permission of their country's authorities. (Jaroslav Jiřík played legally in the NHL in the 1969–70 season, but only in three games.) Playing in his first NHL season, Hlinka set a Canucks record for the most points by a rookie with 60 (later matched by Pavel Bure in 1991–92). During the subsequent 1982 Stanley Cup playoffs, the Canucks advanced to the Finals against the New York Islanders. In a losing effort (Vancouver lost the series in four straight games), Hlinka became the first Czech to play in the Stanley Cup Final (Bubla did not play in them). The following season, Hlinka improved to 63 points over 65 games. In his two years in the NHL, Hlinka totalled 42 goals and assisted on 81 others in 137 games.

Hlinka returned to Europe to finish his playing career due to problems with his back in 1983. He played in the Swiss team EV Zug until 1985, when he returned to Litvínov where he started his coaching career.

== Coaching career ==
After his return to Czechoslovakia, Hlinka began to coach in "his" HC Litvínov. Later, he coached temporarily in Freiburg, Germany.

Hlinka also became very famous for his trick in the 1986–87 season. Litvínov was in last place in the standings of the Czechoslovak league. Hlinka, already 37 years old, began to play again. Litvínov immediately improved its game and went unbeaten in Hlinka's first eight games (six wins and two ties). Altogether, he played 19 games and scored 23 points.

In the 1990s, Hlinka was head coach of Czechoslovak and later Czech national teams. His teams won bronze medals at the Albertville Olympics and the World Championships in 1992 and 1993. He left the national team after an unsuccessful World Championship in 1994.

Hlinka returned in 1997 and his team won the bronze medal at the World Championship again. Hlinka became a national hero when his team won the gold medal at the Nagano Olympics; the first time that the NHL agreed to release its players for the Games. The triumph was celebrated by the whole nation. The dominance of the Czech hockey team in the world was confirmed in May 1999 when Hlinka's team won the World Championship again.

In 2000–01, Hlinka returned to the NHL as head coach of the Pittsburgh Penguins. He and Alpo Suhonen became the second and third Europeans to ever coach in the NHL, following Johnny Gottselig. His first season also coincided with Mario Lemieux's return to the NHL, and together they made a surprising run to the Eastern Conference Finals, knocking off the higher-seeded Washington Capitals and Buffalo Sabres along the way before falling to the New Jersey Devils. The next season was not successful, as the struggling small-market Penguins had traded their superstar, Jaromír Jágr. Hlinka himself was criticized by Lemieux for not taking classes in the summer to improve his English and that contributed to the frosty relationship between them. After losing the first four games of the 2001–02 season, Hlinka was fired and he returned to Europe.

In 2001–02, he worked as general manager of the Czech national team, and in 2002–03, he coached the Russian team Avangard Omsk for one season.

== Coaching record ==
- World Championships: 1 gold (1999), 4 bronzes (1992, 1993, 1997, 1998).
- Olympics: gold (1998), bronze (1992).

| Team | Year | Regular season | | | | | | | Postseason |
| Team | Year | G | W | L | T | OTL | Pts | Finish | Result |
|---|---|---|---|---|---|---|---|---|---|
| PIT | 2000–01 | 82 | 42 | 28 | 9 | 3 | 96 | 3rd in Atlantic | Lost in Conference Finals (NJD) |
| PIT | 2001–02 | 4 | 0 | 4 | 0 | 0 | (69) | (fired) | — |
| Total | | 86 | 42 | 32 | 9 | 3 | | | |

== Death ==
Hlinka was supposed to be once again head coach of the Czech national team in the 2004–05 season. However, he died on August 16, 2004, at age 54 when his car collided head-on with a Daewoo Avia truck driving the wrong way on the E48 highway 200 yards from the town of Karlovy Vary, Czech Republic. He had gone to Karlovy Vary to ensure that Jaromír Jágr would participate in the 2004 World Cup of Hockey. The truck suddenly appeared in Hlinka's lane.

== Honors and awards ==
- Czechoslovak player of the year (1977–78)
- All-star centre at the 1978 IIHF World Championship
- Medal of Merit (1999)
- Inducted to the IIHF Hall of Fame (2002)
- Czech Ice Hockey Legend (2004)
- Ivan Hlinka Memorial Tournament for national U18 ice hockey teams named after him
- Ivan Hlinka Stadion, arena of HC Litvínov is named after him

== Career statistics ==
=== Regular season and playoffs ===
| | | | Regular season | | | | | Playoffs |
| Season | Team | League | GP | G | A | Pts | PIM | GP | G | A | Pts | PIM |
|---|---|---|---|---|---|---|---|---|---|---|---|---|
| 1966–67 | TJ CHZ Litvínov | TCH | 14 | 4 | 0 | 4 | — | — | — | — | — | — |
| 1967–68 | TJ CHZ Litvínov | TCH | 32 | 15 | 14 | 29 | — | — | — | — | — | — |
| 1968–69 | TJ CHZ Litvínov | TCH | 36 | 21 | 17 | 38 | — | — | — | — | — | — |
| 1969–70 | TJ CHZ Litvínov | TCH | 33 | 17 | 17 | 34 | 20 | — | — | — | — | — |
| 1970–71 | TJ CHZ Litvínov | TCH | 36 | 20 | 18 | 38 | — | — | — | — | — | — |
| 1971–72 | TJ CHZ Litvínov | TCH | 36 | 31 | 23 | 54 | — | — | — | — | — | — |
| 1972–73 | TJ CHZ Litvínov | TCH | 36 | 24 | 11 | 35 | — | — | — | — | — | — |
| 1973–74 | TJ CHZ Litvínov | TCH | 42 | 27 | 27 | 54 | — | — | — | — | — | — |
| 1974–75 | TJ CHZ Litvínov | TCH | 44 | 36 | 42 | 78 | — | — | — | — | — | — |
| 1975–76 | TJ CHZ Litvínov | TCH | 30 | 25 | 18 | 43 | 6 | — | — | — | — | — |
| 1976–77 | TJ CHZ Litvínov | TCH | 43 | 39 | 23 | 62 | — | — | — | — | — | — |
| 1977–78 | TJ CHZ Litvínov | TCH | 43 | 32 | 39 | 71 | 30 | — | — | — | — | — |
| 1978–79 | TJ CHZ Litvínov | TCH | 23 | 15 | 17 | 32 | 14 | — | — | — | — | — |
| 1978–79 | ASVŠ Dukla Trenčín | TCH | 8 | 2 | 3 | 5 | 0 | — | — | — | — | — |
| 1979–80 | TJ CHZ Litvínov | TCH | 33 | 14 | 16 | 30 | 8 | — | — | — | — | — |
| 1980–81 | TJ CHZ Litvínov | TCH | 40 | 21 | 31 | 52 | 38 | — | — | — | — | — |
| 1981–82 | Vancouver Canucks | NHL | 72 | 23 | 37 | 60 | 16 | 12 | 2 | 6 | 8 | 4 |
| 1982–83 | Vancouver Canucks | NHL | 65 | 19 | 44 | 63 | 12 | 4 | 1 | 4 | 5 | 4 |
| 1983–84 | EV Zug | CHE II | 41 | 46 | 43 | 89 | — | — | — | — | — | — |
| 1984–85 | EV Zug | CHE II | 39 | 30 | 43 | 73 | — | — | — | — | — | — |
| 1986–87 | TJ CHZ Litvínov | TCH | 9 | 3 | 9 | 12 | 12 | — | — | — | — | — |
| TCH totals | | | 532 | 346 | 325 | 671 | — | — | — | — | — | — |
| NHL totals | | | 137 | 42 | 81 | 123 | 28 | 16 | 3 | 10 | 13 | 8 |

=== International ===
| Year | Team | Event | GP | G | A | Pts | PIM |
|---|---|---|---|---|---|---|---|
| 1970 | Czechoslovakia | WC | 4 | 0 | 0 | 0 | 2 |
| 1971 | Czechoslovakia | WC | 10 | 4 | 2 | 6 | 2 |
| 1972 | Czechoslovakia | OLY | 6 | 5 | 3 | 8 | 2 |
| 1972 | Czechoslovakia | WC | 5 | 2 | 3 | 5 | 0 |
| 1973 | Czechoslovakia | WC | 8 | 2 | 1 | 3 | 0 |
| 1974 | Czechoslovakia | WC | 10 | 9 | 4 | 13 | 2 |
| 1975 | Czechoslovakia | WC | 6 | 2 | 4 | 6 | 2 |
| 1976 | Czechoslovakia | OLY | 5 | 3 | 3 | 6 | 7 |
| 1976 | Czechoslovakia | WC | 10 | 7 | 8 | 15 | 4 |
| 1976 | Czechoslovakia | CC | 7 | 2 | 2 | 4 | 12 |
| 1977 | Czechoslovakia | WC | 10 | 9 | 3 | 12 | 5 |
| 1978 | Czechoslovakia | WC | 10 | 4 | 10 | 14 | 4 |
| 1979 | Czechoslovakia | WC | 8 | 3 | 5 | 8 | 6 |
| 1981 | Czechoslovakia | WC | 8 | 0 | 3 | 3 | 0 |
| Senior totals | | | 107 | 52 | 51 | 103 | 48 |

Awards
| Preceded by Milan Nový | Golden Hockey Stick; 1978 | Succeeded by Vladimír Martinec |
Sporting positions
| Preceded by Herb Brooks | Head coach of the Pittsburgh Penguins; 2000–01 | Succeeded by Rick Kehoe |
