= František Pospíšil =

Czech ice hockey player and coach

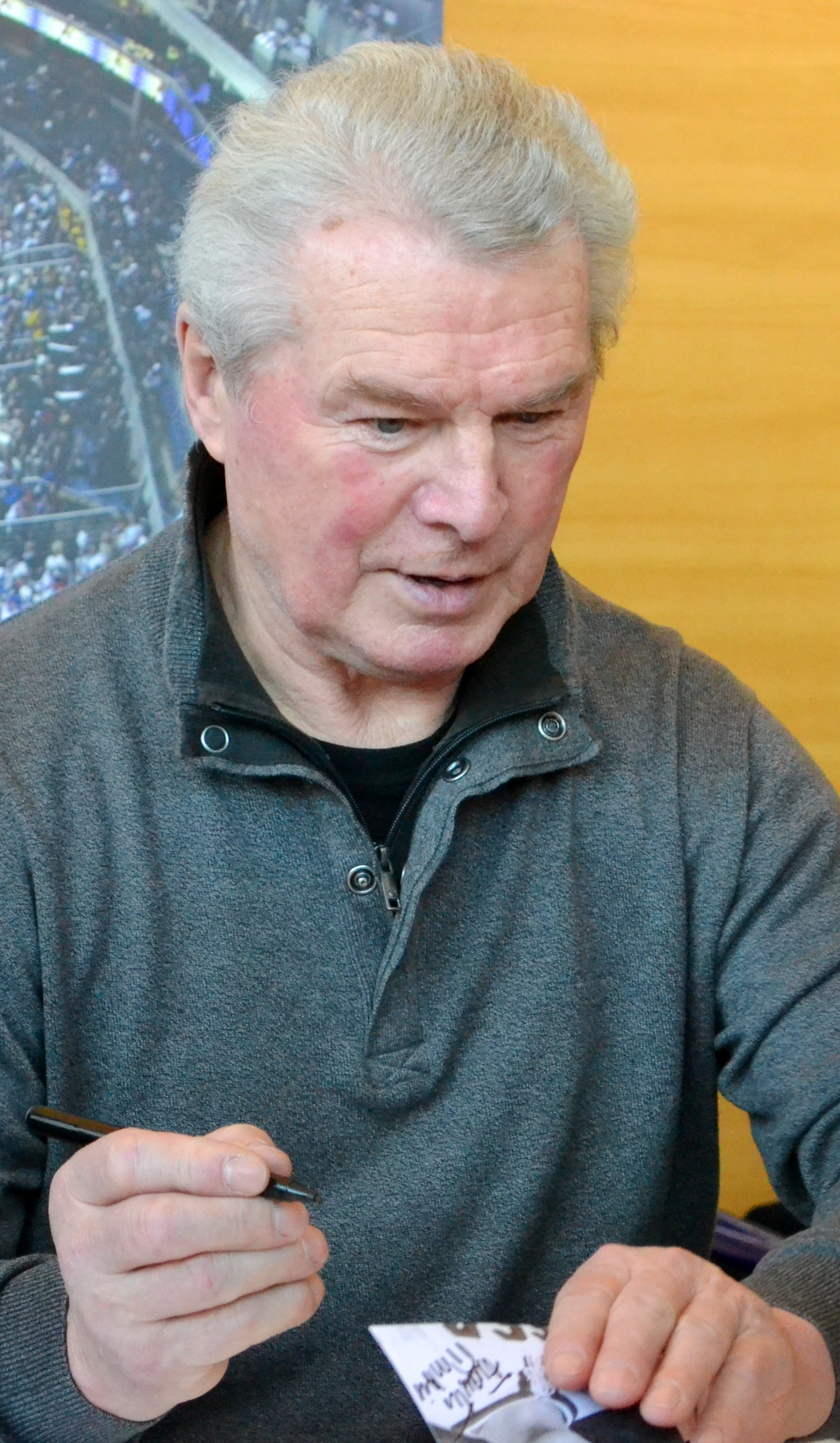
- Pospíšil in 2015
- Born: 2 April 1944 (age 82) Unhošť, Bohemia and Moravia
- Height: 6 ft 0 in (183 cm)
- Weight: 185 lb (84 kg; 13 st 3 lb)
- Position: Defence
- Played for: HC Kladno
- National team: Czechoslovakia
- Playing career: 1966–1979
Medal record
Men's ice hockey
Representing Czechoslovakia
Olympic Games
Silver medal – second place	1968 Grenoble	Team
Silver medal – second place	1976 Innsbruck	Team
Bronze medal – third place	1972 Sapporo	Team

František Pospíšil (born 2 April 1944) is a Czech former ice hockey defenceman and coach. Internationally, he played for the Czechoslovakia men's national ice hockey team from 1967 to 1977, at the IIHF World Championships and the Winter Olympics. He was inducted into the IIHF Hall of Fame in 1999.

== Career ==
He played in the Czechoslovak Elite League for Poldi Kladno from 1961 to 1978, then in Germany for EV Landshut in 1978–79. He won the Golden Hockey Stick as the top player in Czechoslovakia in 1971 and 1972. He scored 134 career goals in 622 league games.

Pospíšil played on the Czechoslovakia men's national ice hockey team from 1967 to 1977, which won the gold medal at the IIHF World Championships in 1972, 1976, and 1977; he was named best defenceman of the tournament in 1972 and 1976. He also played in the 1972 and 1976 Olympics and the 1976 Canada Cup. At the 1976 Olympics he was proven of having used codeine, which was a banned substance back then.

Pospíšil began coaching in Czechoslovakia in 1979, first with his old team Poldi Kladno from 1979 to 1983 and then with Litvínov from 1983 to 1985. He was assistant coach on the national team between 1986 and 1988.

Pospíšil was inducted into the IIHF Hall of Fame in 1999.

== Career statistics ==
			Regular season					Playoffs
Season	Team	League	GP	G	A	Pts	PIM	GP	G	A	Pts	PIM
1965–66	TJ Kladno	Czechoslovakia	36	8	6	14	38	—	—	—	—	—
1966–67	TJ Kladno	Czechoslovakia	36	6	12	18	36	—	—	—	—	—
1967–68	TJ Kladno	Czechoslovakia	32	12	11	23	30	—	—	—	—	—
1968–69	TJ Kladno	Czechoslovakia	36	3	17	20	43	—	—	—	—	—
1969–70	TJ Kladno	Czechoslovakia	36	13	20	33	36	—	—	—	—	—
1970–71	TJ Kladno	Czechoslovakia	36	8	26	34	47	9	2	2	4	8
1971–72	TJ Kladno	Czechoslovakia	35	15	27	42	36	—	—	—	—	—
1972–73	TJ Kladno	Czechoslovakia	32	7	16	23	18	9	3	4	7	0
1973–74	TJ Kladno	Czechoslovakia	44	7	27	34	22	—	—	—	—	—
1974–75	TJ Kladno	Czechoslovakia	44	5	35	40	16	—	—	—	—	—
1975–76	TJ Kladno	Czechoslovakia	32	7	16	23	14	—	—	—	—	—
1976–77	TJ Kladno	Czechoslovakia	42	8	28	36	22	—	—	—	—	—
1977–78	TJ Kladno	Czechoslovakia	44	11	27	38	37	—	—	—	—	—
1978–79	EV Landshut	Germany	49	11	24	35	20	—	—	—	—	—
Czechoslovakia totals			485	110	268	378	395	18	5	6	11	8

== See also ==
- Doping at the Olympic Games

Awards
Preceded by Jan Suchý	Golden Hockey Stick; 1971, 1972	Succeeded by Vladimír Martinec
