= Miroslav Dvořák (ice hockey) =

Czechoslovak ice hockey player

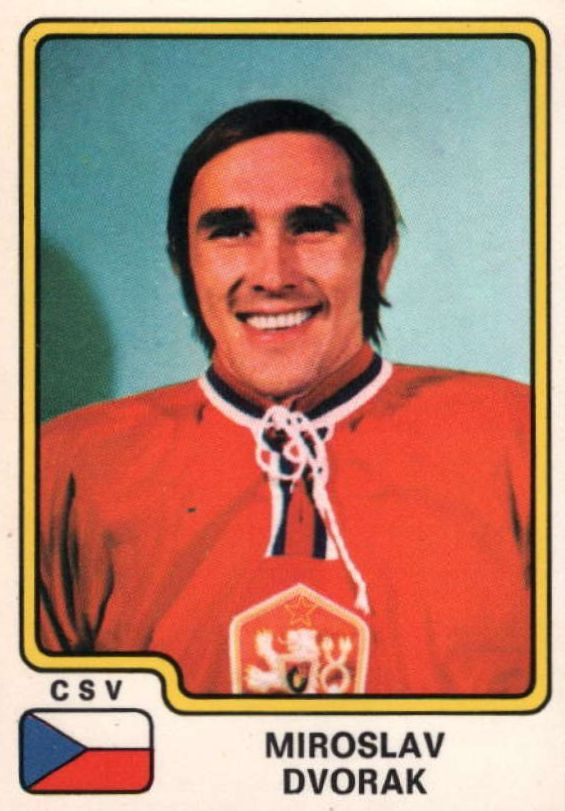
- Born: 11 October 1951 Hluboká nad Vltavou, Czechoslovakia
- Died: 12 June 2008 (aged 56) České Budějovice, Czech Republic
- Height: 5 ft 10 in (178 cm)
- Weight: 200 lb (91 kg; 14 st 4 lb)
- Position: Defense
- Shot: Left
- Played for: HC České Budějovice; ASD Dukla Jihlava; Philadelphia Flyers
- National team: Czechoslovakia
- NHL draft: 46th overall, 1982; Philadelphia Flyers
- Playing career: 1969–1989

Miroslav Dvořák (11 October 1951 – 12 June 2008) was a Czechoslovak ice hockey defenseman. He played three seasons in the National Hockey League (NHL) with the Philadelphia Flyers from 1982 to 1985. The rest of his career, which lasted from 1969 to 1989, was mainly spent with HC České Budějovice in the Czechoslovak First Ice Hockey League. Internationally, Dvořák played for the Czechoslovak national team at several Ice Hockey World Championships, winning gold medals in 1976 and 1977, along with six silver medals, and a silver medal at the 1976 Winter Olympics.

== Playing career ==
In 1967 Dvořák started his ice hockey career playing for the HC České Budějovice junior team and from 1970 became a member of the senior team. In the same year Dvořák was named the best defender of the World Junior Championships held in Sweden. During his military service he moved to the army team Dukla Jihlava where he spent two seasons. He also played for the Czechoslovak national ice hockey team and won eight medals overall in the Ice Hockey World Championships in years 1974, 1975, 1976, 1977, 1978, 1982 and 1983 and represented Czechoslovakia at the 1976 and 1981 Canada Cups and the 1980 Winter Olympics as well. He was drafted by the Philadelphia Flyers in the third round of the 1982 NHL entry draft and played three seasons in North America. He had to wait until his thirties to play in the NHL, as playing overseas under the age of 30 was strictly prohibited because of sports rules during the communist era in Czechoslovakia. He left professional ice hockey after the 1988–89 season and went back to Czechoslovakia to play for HC České Budějovice.

== Death ==
Dvořák died in the Czech Republic at the age of 56 on 12 June 2008, after a long battle with throat cancer. His family played composer Antonín Dvořák's "New World Symphony" at the funeral.

== Career statistics ==
=== Regular season and playoffs ===
			Regular season					Playoffs
Season	Team	League	GP	G	A	Pts	PIM	GP	G	A	Pts	PIM
1970–71	TJ Motor České Budějovice	CSSR	36	4	5	9	2	—	—	—	—	—
1971–72	TJ Motor České Budějovice	CSSR	20	1	1	2	24	—	—	—	—	—
1972–73	ASD Dukla Jihlava	CSSR	—	4	7	11	—	—	—	—	—	—
1973–74	ASD Dukla Jihlava	CSSR	—	14	7	21	—	—	—	—	—	—
1974–75	TJ Motor České Budějovice	CSSR	44	10	9	19	34	—	—	—	—	—
1975–76	TJ Motor České Budějovice	CSSR	31	9	4	13	18	—	—	—	—	—
1976–77	TJ Motor České Budějovice	CSSR	43	4	12	16	26	—	—	—	—	—
1977–78	TJ Motor České Budějovice	CSSR	43	11	17	28	34	—	—	—	—	—
1978–79	TJ Motor České Budějovice	CSSR	42	3	18	21	14	—	—	—	—	—
1979–80	TJ Motor České Budějovice	CSSR	44	7	17	24	27	—	—	—	—	—
1980–81	TJ Motor České Budějovice	CSSR	44	8	25	33	38	—	—	—	—	—
1981–82	TJ Motor České Budějovice	CSSR	38	7	16	23	24	—	—	—	—	—
1982–83	Philadelphia Flyers	NHL	80	4	33	37	20	3	0	1	1	0
1983–84	Philadelphia Flyers	NHL	66	4	27	31	27	2	0	0	0	2
1984–85	Philadelphia Flyers	NHL	47	3	14	17	4	13	0	1	1	4
1985–86	ESG Kassel	GER-2	45	13	48	61	36	17	8	23	31	30
1986–87	ESG Kassel	GER-2	34	4	40	44	32	18	4	14	18	12
1987–88	EHC Essen-West	GER-2	36	10	36	46	16	—	—	—	—	—
1988–89	TJ Motor České Budějovice	CSSR	27	0	7	7	4	12	0	3	3	12
CSSR totals			412	82	145	227	255	12	0	3	3	12
NHL totals			193	11	74	85	51	18	0	2	2	6

=== International ===
Medal record

Representing Czechoslovakia

Olympics
Silver medal – second place	1976 Innsbruck	

World Championships
Gold medal – first place	1976 Austria	
Gold medal – first place	1977 Poland	
Silver medal – second place	1974 Finland	
Silver medal – second place	1975 West Germany	
Silver medal – second place	1978 Czechoslovakia	
Silver medal – second place	1979 Soviet Union	
Silver medal – second place	1982 Finland	
Silver medal – second place	1983 Germany	

Year	Team	Event	GP	G	A	Pts	PIM
1970	Czechoslovakia	EJC	5	1	0	1	4
1974	Czechoslovakia	WC	4	0	3	3	4
1975	Czechoslovakia	WC	10	2	4	6	2
1976	Czechoslovakia	OLY	6	1	4	5	2
1976	Czechoslovakia	WC	7	0	0	0	4
1976	Czechoslovakia	CC	7	0	1	1	4
1977	Czechoslovakia	WC	9	0	1	1	8
1978	Czechoslovakia	WC	10	0	2	2	4
1979	Czechoslovakia	WC	8	0	0	0	0
1980	Czechoslovakia	OLY	5	0	1	1	0
1981	Czechoslovakia	WC	8	1	2	3	4
1981	Czechoslovakia	CC	6	0	3	3	2
1982	Czechoslovakia	WC	10	0	5	5	4
1983	Czechoslovakia	WC	10	0	3	3	14
Senior totals			110	4	29	33	52
