= František Kaberle Sr. =

Czech ice hockey player

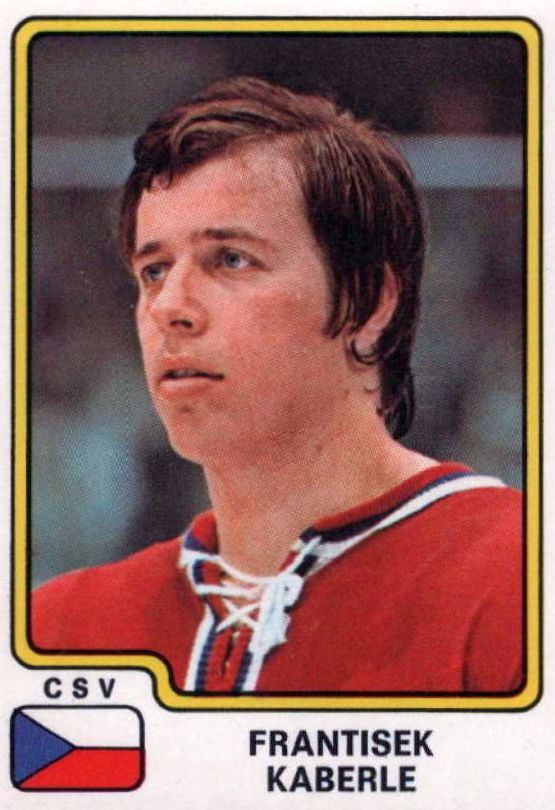
- Born: August 6, 1951 (age 74) Kladno, TCH
- Height: 5 ft 11 in (180 cm)
- Weight: 196 lb (89 kg; 14 st 0 lb)
- Position: Defence
- Played for: HC Kladno; HC Dukla Jihlava
- National team: Czechoslovakia
- Playing career: 1970–1983

František Kaberle (born 6 August 1951 in Kladno, Czechoslovakia) is a Czech former professional ice hockey defenceman.

Kaberle spent the majority of his career with HC Kladno where he won five Czechoslovak Extraliga championships and was instrumental in the team's exhibition game victory over the Toronto Maple Leafs in 1977. He was also a member of the Czechoslovak national ice hockey team in the mid-1970s winning the World Championships twice, in 1976 and 1977. He also played at the 1980 Winter Olympics.

== Personal life ==
He is the father of Tomáš Kaberle and František Kaberle, who both went on to play in the National Hockey League.

== Career statistics ==
| | | | Regular season | | | | | Playoffs |
| Season | Team | League | GP | G | A | Pts | PIM | GP | G | A | Pts | PIM |
|---|---|---|---|---|---|---|---|---|---|---|---|---|
| 1970–71 | TJ Kladno | Czechoslovakia | 25 | 2 | 0 | 2 | 12 | 8 | 0 | 0 | 0 | 4 |
| 1971–72 | TJ Kladno | Czechoslovakia | 36 | 5 | 7 | 12 | 28 | — | — | — | — | — |
| 1973–74 | ASD Dukla Jihlava | Czechoslovakia | — | — | — | — | — | — | — | — | — | — |
| 1974–75 | TJ Kladno | Czechoslovakia | 44 | 2 | 13 | 15 | 34 | — | — | — | — | — |
| 1975–76 | TJ Kladno | Czechoslovakia | 21 | 6 | 5 | 11 | 6 | — | — | — | — | — |
| 1976–77 | TJ Kladno | Czechoslovakia | 44 | 4 | 24 | 28 | 26 | — | — | — | — | — |
| 1977–78 | TJ Kladno | Czechoslovakia | 43 | 9 | 18 | 27 | 20 | — | — | — | — | — |
| 1978–79 | TJ Kladno | Czechoslovakia | 44 | 8 | 15 | 23 | 24 | — | — | — | — | — |
| 1979–80 | TJ Kladno | Czechoslovakia | 42 | 1 | 11 | 12 | 26 | — | — | — | — | — |
| 1980–81 | TJ Kladno | Czechoslovakia | 10 | 0 | 6 | 6 | 6 | — | — | — | — | — |
| 1981–82 | TJ Kladno | Czechoslovakia | 37 | 7 | 7 | 14 | 30 | — | — | — | — | — |
| 1982–83 | TJ Kladno | Czechoslovakia | 16 | 1 | 5 | 6 | 10 | — | — | — | — | — |
| Czechoslovakia totals | | | 362 | 45 | 111 | 156 | 222 | 8 | 0 | 0 | 0 | 4 |
