= Jiří Crha =

Czech ice hockey player

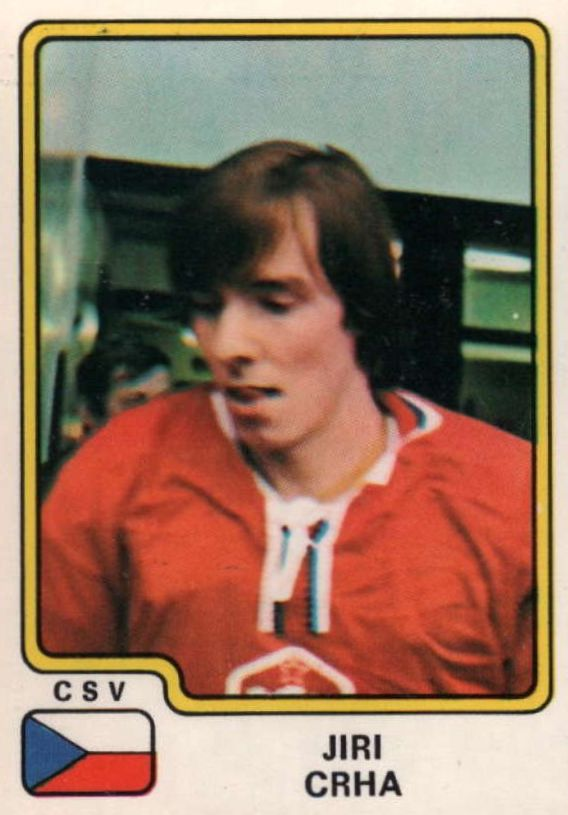
- Crha in 1979
- Born: 13 April 1950 (age 76) Pardubice, Czechoslovakia
- Height: 5 ft 11 in (180 cm)
- Weight: 170 lb (77 kg; 12 st 2 lb)
- Position: Goaltender
- Caught: Left
- Played for: Toronto Maple Leafs
- National team: Czechoslovakia
- NHL draft: Undrafted
- Playing career: 1969–1993
Medal record
Men's ice hockey
Representing Czechoslovakia
Olympic Games
Silver medal – second place	1976 Innsbruck	Team

Jiří Crha (born 13 April 1950) is a Czech former ice hockey goaltender. He played 69 games in the National Hockey League for the Toronto Maple Leafs between 1980 and 1981. The rest of his career, which lasted from 1969 to 1993, was spent first in the Czechoslovak First Ice Hockey League and then the German Eishockey-Bundesliga. Internationally Crha played for the Czechoslovak national team in several tournaments, including the 1976 Winter Olympics, where he won a silver medal.

== Playing career ==
Born in Pardubice, Czechoslovakia, now the Czech Republic, Crha played for nine seasons in the Czechoslovak First Ice Hockey League and for his country at the international level, including the 1976 Winter Olympics. He was signed by the Toronto Maple Leafs as a free agent on 4 February 1980. He remained with the team until 1983 when he went to Germany, where he played until his retirement in 1991. He then served as a player agent to players in the Czech Republic.

== Career statistics ==
=== Regular season and playoffs ===
			Regular season									Playoffs
Season	Team	League	GP	W	L	T	MIN	GA	SO	GAA	SV%	GP	W	L	MIN	GA	SO	GAA	SV%
1969–70	HC Dukla Jihlava	CSSR	19	—	—	—	1140	45	1	2.37	—	—	—	—	—	—	—	—	—
1970–71	HC Dukla Jihlava	CSSR	32	—	—	—	1825	75	2	2.46	—	—	—	—	—	—	—	—	—
1971–72	TJ Pardubice	CSSR	33	—	—	—	—	—	—	3.06	—	—	—	—	—	—	—	—	—
1972–73	TJ Pardubice	CSSR	—	—	—	—	—	—	—	—	—	—	—	—	—	—	—	—	—
1973–74	TJ Pardubice	CSSR	—	—	—	—	—	—	—	—	—	—	—	—	—	—	—	—	—
1974–75	TJ Pardubice	CSSR	—	—	—	—	—	—	—	—	—	—	—	—	—	—	—	—	—
1975–76	TJ Pardubice	CSSR	—	—	—	—	—	—	—	—	—	—	—	—	—	—	—	—	—
1976–77	TJ Pardubice	CSSR	44	—	—	—	2640	145	—	3.30	—	—	—	—	—	—	—	—	—
1977–78	TJ Pardubice	CSSR	44	—	—	—	2595	128	—	2.96	—	—	—	—	—	—	—	—	—
1978–79	TJ Pardubice	CSSR	37	—	—	—	2220	117	—	3.16	—	—	—	—	—	—	—	—	—
1979–80	Toronto Maple Leafs	NHL	15	8	7	0	830	50	0	3.62	.908	2	0	2	121	10	0	4.98	.891
1979–80	New Brunswick Hawks	AHL	7	4	1	2	404	15	1	2.23	.922	—	—	—	—	—	—	—	—
1980–81	Toronto Maple Leafs	NHL	54	20	20	11	3105	211	0	4.08	.875	3	0	2	65	11	0	10.23	.750
1981–82	Cincinnati Tigers	CHL	2	1	0	0	81	11	0	8.15	.774	—	—	—	—	—	—	—	—
1982–83	St. Catharines Saints	AHL	1	—	—	—	60	6	0	6.00	.838	—	—	—	—	—	—	—	—
1983–84	SV Bayreuth	GER-2	—	—	—	—	—	—	—	—	—	—	—	—	—	—	—	—	—
1985–86	EHC Freiburg	GER-2	—	—	—	—	—	—	—	—	—	—	—	—	—	—	—	—	—
1986–87	EHC Freiburg	GER-2	—	—	—	—	—	—	—	—	—	—	—	—	—	—	—	—	—
1987–88	EHC Freiburg	GER-2	—	—	—	—	—	—	—	—	—	—	—	—	—	—	—	—	—
1988–89	EHC Freiburg	GER	—	—	—	—	—	—	—	—	—	—	—	—	—	—	—	—	—
1989–90	EHC Freiburg	GER	—	—	—	—	—	—	—	—	—	—	—	—	—	—	—	—	—
1990–91	EHC Freiburg	GER	—	—	—	—	—	—	—	—	—	—	—	—	—	—	—	—	—
1991–92	EHC Freiburg	GER	40	—	—	—	2376	161	0	4.07	—	—	—	—	—	—	—	—	—
1992–93	EHC Freiburg	GER	41	12	23	2	2427	149	0	3.68	—	—	—	—	—	—	—	—	—
NHL totals			69	28	27	11	3935	261	0	3.98	.883	5	0	4	186	21	0	6.81	.846

=== International ===
Year	Team	Event	GP	W	L	T	MIN	GA	SO	GAA	SV%
1968	Czechoslovakia	EJC	5	—	—	—	—	—	—	—	.915
1969	Czechoslovakia	EJC	—	—	—	—	—	—	—	—	—
1973	Czechoslovakia	WC	2	2	0	0	120	3	0	1.50	.943
1974	Czechoslovakia	WC	5	3	1	0	260	10	1	2.31	.894
1975	Czechoslovakia	WC	2	0	1	0	75	5	0	4.00	.800
1976	Czechoslovakia	OLY	2	—	—	—	37	1	0	1.62	.875
1978	Czechoslovakia	WC	1	1	0	0	60	2	0	2.00	.917
Senior totals			12	—	—	—	552	21	1	2.28	—
