= Ondrej Weissmann =

Czech ice hockey player

- Born: October 28, 1959 (age 65); Czechoslovakia
- Height: 6 ft 1 in (185 cm)
- Weight: 185 lb (84 kg; 13 st 3 lb)
- Position: Defence/Left wing
- Played for: Czech Extraliga; HC Slavia Praha; HC Dukla Jihlava
- NHL draft: Undrafted
- Playing career: 1975–1991

Ondrej Weissmann (born October 28, 1959) is a Czech former professional ice hockey player who played 14 seasons in the Czech Extraliga. He is currently an assistant coach with the Czech Republic men's national ice hockey team.

== Career statistics ==
			Regular season					Playoffs
Season	Team	League	GP	G	A	Pts	PIM	GP	G	A	Pts	PIM
1975–76	TJ Litvinov	Czechoslovak	5	0	0	0	—	—	—	—	—	—
1976–77	TJ Litvinov	Czechoslovak	2	0	0	0	—	—	—	—	—	—
1977–78	TJ Litvinov U18	Czechoslovak U18	—	—	—	—	—	—	—	—	—	—
1977–78	TJ Litvinov	Czechoslovak	39	5	1	6	16	—	—	—	—	—
1978–79	TJ Litvinov U18	Czechoslovak U18	—	—	—	—	—	—	—	—	—	—
1978–79	TJ Litvinov	Czechoslovak	35	3	1	4	10	—	—	—	—	—
1979–80	TJ Litvinov	Czechoslovak	37	2	2	4	20	—	—	—	—	—
1980–81	TJ Litvinov	Czechoslovak	43	8	7	15	16	—	—	—	—	—
1981–82	TJ Litvinov	Czechoslovak	42	9	16	25	—	—	—	—	—	—
1982–83	ASD Dukla Jihlava	Czechoslovak	37	6	5	11	22	—	—	—	—	—
1983–84	ASD Dukla Jihlava	Czechoslovak	44	8	8	16	24	—	—	—	—	—
1984–85	TJ Litvinov	Czechoslovak	42	9	4	13	20	—	—	—	—	—
1985–86	TJ Litvinov	Czechoslovak	43	6	5	11	—	—	—	—	—	—
1986–87	TJ Litvinov	Czechoslovak	34	4	6	10	24	—	—	—	—	—
1987–88	TJ Litvinov	Czechoslovak	40	5	5	10	—	—	—	—	—	—
1988–89	TJ Litvinov	Czechoslovak	30	0	4	4	30	7	0	1	1	—
1989–90	TJ Litvinov	Czechoslovak	36	1	6	7	0	—	—	—	—	—
1990–91	Zoldo	Italy2	—	—	—	—	—	—	—	—	—	—
Czechoslovak totals			509	66	70	136	182	7	0	1	1	0
