= Vladimír Růžička =

Czech ice hockey player (born 1963)

- Růžička in 2010
- Born: 6 June 1963 (age 63) Most, Czechoslovakia
- Height: 6 ft 3 in (191 cm)
- Weight: 210 lb (95 kg; 15 st 0 lb)
- Position: Centre
- Shot: Left
- Played for: CHZ Litvínov; HK Dukla Trenčín; Edmonton Oilers; Boston Bruins; Ottawa Senators; HC Slavia Praha
- National team: Czechoslovakia and Czech Republic
- NHL draft: 73rd overall, 1982; Toronto Maple Leafs
- Playing career: 1979–2000

Vladimír Růžička (Czech pronunciation: [ˈvlaɟɪmiːr ˈruːʒɪtʃka]; born 6 June 1963, nickname "Rosie") is a Czech ice hockey coach and former professional player. Růžička was twice named the top player in the Czechoslovak Elite League, and was on the gold medal team in the Ice Hockey World Championship in 1985 and 1998 Olympic Games. He also played 233 games in the National Hockey League (NHL). Since 2008, Růžička has been the head coach of both HC Slavia Praha and the Czech national ice hockey team.

== Playing career ==
Růžička started his career with Czechoslovak side Litvínov, making his first appearance at the age of 16 and scoring after just 10 seconds in his first game, against Dukla Jihlava. Růžička was selected by the Toronto Maple Leafs 73rd overall in the 1982 NHL entry draft. Despite this, he was barred from leaving Czechoslovakia by the Communist authorities. He continued to play internationally for Czechoslovakia before finally making his NHL debut in 1989. Růžička had a short career in the NHL, playing a total of five seasons for the Edmonton Oilers, Boston Bruins and Ottawa Senators. His best season statistically came in 1991–92 when he recorded 75 points (39 goals, 36 assists) with Boston, and led the team in scoring. He has a Stanley Cup ring and is on the 1990 Edmonton Oilers Stanley Cup team picture. However, Růžička only played 25 regular season games and did not appear in the playoffs that season. Thus, his name was not engraved on the Stanley Cup. Růžička finished his NHL career with 233 games, scoring 82 goals and 85 assists.

Růžička played 200 games for his national team, scoring 112 goals in the process. In 1985, he won a gold medal with Czechoslovakia at the 1985 World Ice Hockey Championships. He captained the gold medal-winning Czech Republic team at the 1998 Winter Olympics, going on to retire from the international team after the tournament.

== Awards ==
- 1985: World championship All-star team
- 1986: Golden Hockey Stick
- 1988: Golden Hockey Stick

== Coaching career ==
After retiring as a player in 2000 he started working as a coach in HC Slavia Praha and in 2002–03 and 2007–08 seasons his team won the Czech Extraliga. Between 2002 and 2004 he was also an assistant coach of the Czech national ice hockey team. Shortly after he left the team, the head coach Ivan Hlinka died and Růžička took over the position, leading the Czech Republic team to the Vienna World Championship gold medal in 2005. Růžička has coached the Czech national ice hockey team to two gold medals.

== Career statistics ==
=== Regular season and playoffs ===
			Regular season					Playoffs
Season	Team	League	GP	G	A	Pts	PIM	GP	G	A	Pts	PIM
1979–80	TJ CHZ Litvínov	CSSR	9	1	1	2	0	—	—	—	—	—
1980–81	TJ CHZ Litvínov	CSSR	41	12	13	25	10	—	—	—	—	—
1981–82	TJ CHZ Litvínov	CSSR	44	27	22	49	50	—	—	—	—	—
1982–83	TJ CHZ Litvínov	CSSR	43	22	24	46	40	—	—	—	—	—
1983–84	TJ CHZ Litvínov	CSSR	44	31	23	54	50	—	—	—	—	—
1984–85	TJ CHZ Litvínov	CSSR	41	38	22	60	29	—	—	—	—	—
1985–86	TJ CHZ Litvínov	CSSR	43	41	32	73	—	—	—	—	—	—
1986–87	TJ CHZ Litvínov	CSSR	32	24	15	39	46	—	—	—	—	—
1987–88	ASVŠ Dukla Trenčín	CSSR	44	38	27	65	70	—	—	—	—	—
1988–89	ASVŠ Dukla Trenčín	CSSR	34	31	30	61	42	11	15	8	23	—
1989–90	TJ CHZ Litvínov	CSSR	32	21	23	44	—	—	—	—	—	—
1989–90	Edmonton Oilers	NHL	25	11	6	17	10	—	—	—	—	—
1990–91	Boston Bruins	NHL	29	8	8	16	19	17	2	11	13	0
1991–92	Boston Bruins	NHL	77	39	36	75	48	13	2	3	5	2
1992–93	Boston Bruins	NHL	60	19	22	41	38	—	—	—	—	—
1993–94	Ottawa Senators	NHL	42	5	13	18	14	—	—	—	—	—
1993–94	EV Zug	NDA	—	—	—	—	—	6	2	3	5	14
1993–94	Slavia Praha	CZE-2	—	—	—	—	—	5	6	3	9	—
1994–95	Slavia Praha	CZE	41	27	24	51	38	3	2	0	2	2
1995–96	Slavia Praha	CZE	37	21	44	65	46	5	2	1	3	26
1996–97	Slavia Praha	CZE	44	22	31	53	78	—	—	—	—	—
1997–98	Slavia Praha	CZE	49	18	38	56	56	5	0	6	6	20
1998–99	Slavia Praha	CZE	49	24	28	52	22	—	—	—	—	—
1999–00	Slavia Praha	CZE	21	5	8	13	16	—	—	—	—	—
CSSR totals			407	286	232	518	—	11	15	8	23	—
CZE totals			241	117	173	290	256	13	4	7	11	48
NHL totals			233	82	85	167	129	30	4	14	18	2

=== International ===
Medal record

Representing Czechoslovakia

Men's ice hockey

European Junior Championships
Gold medal – first place	1979 Poland	
Silver medal – second place	1981 Soviet Union	

World Junior Championships
Silver medal – second place	1982 United States	
Silver medal – second place	1983 Soviet Union	

World Championships
Gold medal – first place	1985 Czechoslovakia	
Silver medal – second place	1983 West Germany	
Bronze medal – third place	1987 Austria	
Bronze medal – third place	1989 Sweden	

Olympic Games
Silver medal – second place	1984 Sarajevo	

Representing Czech Republic

Olympic Games
Gold medal – first place	1998 Nagano	

Year	Team	Event	GP	G	A	Pts	PIM
1979	Czechoslovakia	EJC	3	1	2	3	2
1981	Czechoslovakia	WJC	5	5	0	5	2
1981	Czechoslovakia	EJC	5	8	8	16	18
1982	Czechoslovakia	WJC	7	8	1	9	6
1983	Czechoslovakia	WJC	7	12	8	20	6
1983	Czechoslovakia	WC	10	3	1	4	4
1984	Czechoslovakia	OLY	7	4	6	10	0
1984	Czechoslovakia	CC	5	0	0	0	2
1985	Czechoslovakia	WC	10	8	3	11	0
1986	Czechoslovakia	WC	10	4	11	15	6
1987	Czechoslovakia	WC	10	3	3	6	10
1987	Czechoslovakia	CC	6	2	0	2	0
1988	Czechoslovakia	OLY	8	4	3	7	12
1989	Czechoslovakia	WC	10	7	7	14	2
1998	Czech Republic	OLY	6	3	0	3	0
Junior totals			27	34	19	53	34
Senior totals			82	38	34	72	36

Awards and achievements
Preceded by Dominik Hašek; Jiří Králík	Czechoslovak Golden Hockey Stick; 1988; 1986	Succeeded by Dominik Hašek; Dominik Hašek
