= Jaroslav Pouzar =

Czech ice hockey player (born 1952)

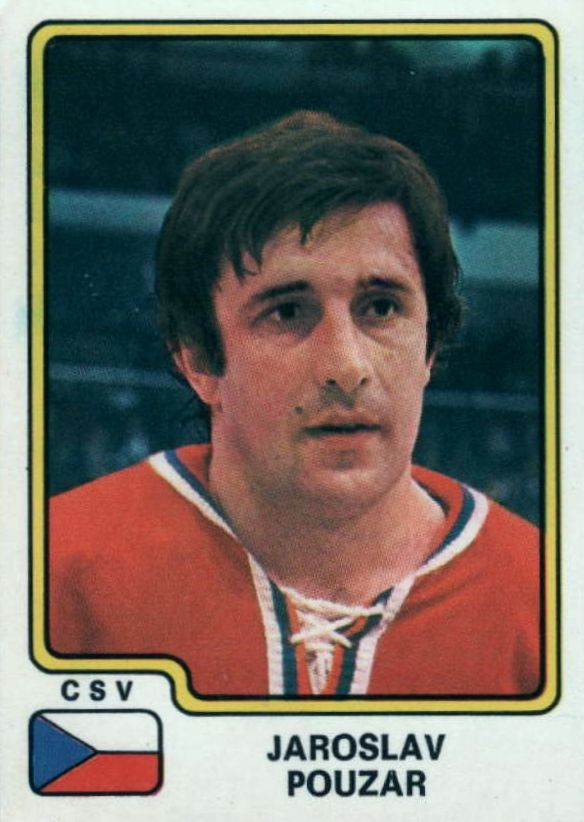
- Born: 23 January 1952 (age 74) Čakovec, Czechoslovakia
- Height: 5 ft 11 in (180 cm)
- Weight: 200 lb (91 kg; 14 st 4 lb)
- Position: Left wing
- Shot: Left
- Played for: Motor Ceske Budejovice; Edmonton Oilers; ECD Iserlohn; SB DJK Rosenheim; Augsburger EV
- National team: Czechoslovakia
- NHL draft: 83rd overall, 1982; Edmonton Oilers
- Playing career: 1972–1992
Medal record
Men's ice hockey
Representing Czechoslovakia
Olympic Games
Silver medal – second place	1976 Innsbruck	Team
World Championships
Gold medal – first place	1976 Poland	Team
Gold medal – first place	1977 Austria	Team
Silver medal – second place	1978 Czechoslovakia	Team
Silver medal – second place	1979 Soviet Union	Team
Silver medal – second place	1981 Sweden	Team
Bronze medal – third place	1982 Finland	Team

Jaroslav Pouzar (born 23 January 1952) is a Czech former professional ice hockey forward. He was selected in the fourth round of the 1982 NHL entry draft, 83rd overall, by the Edmonton Oilers. He won two Stanley Cups with Edmonton in 1984, 1985. He left to play in Europe in the summer of 1985. He returned during 1987 season to win a third cup with Edmonton. Pouzar played parts of four NHL seasons with Edmonton, as well as seeing extensive playing time in Europe.

Pouzar twice represented Czechoslovakia at the Winter Olympics, in 1976 and 1980. He was inducted into the player category of the IIHF Hall of Fame during the 2024 IIHF World Championship.

== Awards and achievements ==
- 3× Stanley Cup champion – 1984, 1985, 1987

== Career statistics ==
=== Regular season and playoffs ===
			Regular season					Playoffs
Season	Team	League	GP	G	A	Pts	PIM	GP	G	A	Pts	PIM
1972–73	TJ Motor České Budějovice	CSSR	40	23	6	29	—	—	—	—	—	—
1973–74	TJ Motor České Budějovice	CSSR	40	25	8	33	—	—	—	—	—	—
1975–76	TJ Motor České Budějovice	CSSR	30	14	7	21	38	—	—	—	—	—
1976–77	TJ Motor České Budějovice	CSSR	44	29	15	44	—	—	—	—	—	—
1977–78	TJ Motor České Budějovice	CSSR	43	42	20	62	—	—	—	—	—	—
1978–79	TJ Motor České Budějovice	CSSR	23	10	7	17	38	15	10	4	14	—
1979–80	TJ Motor České Budějovice	CSSR	44	39	23	62	48	23	10	10	20	31
1980–81	TJ Motor České Budějovice	CSSR	42	29	23	52	45	28	8	5	13	—
1981–82	TJ Motor České Budějovice	CSSR	34	19	17	36	32	—	—	—	—	—
1982–83	Edmonton Oilers	NHL	74	15	18	33	57	1	2	0	2	0
1983–84	Edmonton Oilers	NHL	67	13	19	32	44	14	1	2	3	12
1984–85	Edmonton Oilers	NHL	33	4	8	12	28	9	2	1	3	2
1985–86	ECD Iserlohn	GER	36	17	26	43	39	8	3	5	8	—
1986–87	ECD Iserlohn	GER	35	29	32	61	30	3	3	6	9	—
1986–87	Edmonton Oilers	NHL	12	2	3	5	6	5	1	1	2	2
1987–88	ECD Iserlohn	GER	26	16	18	34	15	—	—	—	—	—
1987–88	Sportbund DJK Rosenheim	GER	7	3	7	10	14	5	1	4	5	0
1988–89	Sportbund DJK Rosenheim	GER	36	20	34	54	26	11	10	10	20	22
1989–90	Sportbund DJK Rosenheim	GER	35	9	31	40	32	11	2	7	9	28
1990–91	Augsburger EV	GER-2	33	17	46	63	26	18	18	16	34	16
1991–92	Sportbund DJK Rosenheim	GER	5	1	2	3	4	—	—	—	—	—
CSSR totals			340	230	126	356	—	66	28	19	47	—
GER totals			175	94	148	242	156	38	19	32	51	—
NHL totals			186	34	48	82	135	29	6	4	10	16

=== International ===
Year	Team	Event	GP	G	A	Pts	PIM
1976	Czechoslovakia	OLY	5	1	1	2	2
1976	Czechoslovakia	WC	8	2	3	5	0
1976	Czechoslovakia	CC	5	2	0	2	4
1977	Czechoslovakia	WC	10	4	4	8	14
1978	Czechoslovakia	WC	10	7	1	8	4
1979	Czechoslovakia	WC	8	4	3	7	6
1980	Czechoslovakia	OLY	6	8	5	13	8
1981	Czechoslovakia	WC	7	1	1	2	2
1981	Czechoslovakia	CC	6	1	1	2	4
1982	Czechoslovakia	WC	10	3	1	4	6
Senior totals			75	33	20	53	50
