= Jiří Dopita =

Czech ice hockey player and coach (born 1968)

- Born: 2 December 1968 (age 57) Šumperk, Czechoslovakia
- Height: 6 ft 4 in (193 cm)
- Weight: 227 lb (103 kg; 16 st 3 lb)
- Position: Centre
- Shot: Left
- Played for: HC Dukla Jihlava (ČSSR); HC Olomouc (CSSR); Eisbären Berlin (DEL); HC Vsetín (CZE); Philadelphia Flyers (NHL); Edmonton Oilers (NHL); HC Pardubice (CZE); HC Znojemští Orli (CZE)
- National team: Czech Republic
- NHL draft: 133rd overall, 1992; Boston Bruins; 123rd overall, 1998; New York Islanders
- Playing career: 1990–2013

Medal record

Representing Czech Republic

Men's ice hockey

World Championships
Gold medal – first place	1996 Austria	
Gold medal – first place	2000 Russia	
Gold medal – first place	2001 Germany	
Bronze medal – third place	1997 Finland	
Bronze medal – third place	1998 Switzerland	

Winter Olympics
Gold medal – first place	1998 Nagano	

Jiří Dopita (Czech pronunciation: [ˈjɪr̝iː ˈdopɪta], born 2 December 1968 in Šumperk, Czechoslovakia) is former Czech professional ice hockey player, and later ice hockey coach. He has played in the Czech Elite League most of his career. He briefly played in the National Hockey League. Dopita has primarily played center throughout his career.

== Playing career ==
Early in his career, Dopita attracted little notice as a professional prospect. At age 23, Dopita was selected in the sixth round of the 1992 NHL Entry Draft by the Boston Bruins, but never came to North America while the Bruins owned his rights. However, starting in 1993, Dopita joined the German Bundesliga with Eisbären Berlin, averaging over a point per game in the Bundeliga and with Berlin's later entry in the Deutsche Eishockey Liga.

Starting in the 1995–96 season, Dopita returned to his native Czech Republic and played with VHK Vsetín of the Czech Extraliga. Dopita continued his scoring pace in the Czech Republic, averaging over a point per game every year in six seasons with Vsetín, compiling 315 career points, and being selected again in the NHL draft, this time in 1998 being selected in the 5th round at 123rd overall by the New York Islanders. However, once again, Dopita would not play with the Islanders. And at the 1999 NHL entry draft, his rights were traded to the Florida Panthers for a 5th-round choice that year.

By the late 1990s, some, such as the Hockey News, considered Dopita the best player outside the NHL. He was a member of the gold medal-winning Czech team at the 1998 Winter Olympics, and was named Czech player of the year in 2001, the first non-NHLer to win the award since Roman Turek in 1994. When it became clear that Dopita still did not seem to have interest in coming to North America, his NHL rights were moved again at the 2001 NHL entry draft to the Philadelphia Flyers for a 2nd-round selection that year, the Flyers made a concerted effort to bring Dopita to the NHL. The Flyers had convinced Dopita's former Vsetin HC teammate Roman Cechmanek to come to North America before the previous season, and the 32-year-old Dopita agreed to join him in Philadelphia for the 2001–02 NHL season.

However, Dopita's time in the NHL proved to be disappointing. He recorded respectable totals getting limited ice time with Philadelphia, including a four-goal game against the Atlanta Thrashers, but a knee injury limited him to 52 games. After the season, his rights were traded to the Edmonton Oilers, where he was expected to be a top-two centre. However, Dopita had a terrible season, recording only six points in 21 games.

After only two years in the NHL, Dopita returned to the Czech Republic, this time with LTC Pardubice. In his second year with Pardubice, at age 36, Dopita recorded less than a point per game in European competition for the first time since his time with HC Olomouc. For 2005–06, Dopita joined HC JME Znojemští Orli and remained with the team for the 2006–07 season.

On 5 May 2006, Dopita became the majority shareholder of HC Olomouc.

== Coaching career ==
From 2013–14 to 2014–15, Dopita served as the assistant coach of HC Olomouc, the team he owned.

At the start of the 2015–16 season, Dopita was head coach of the HC Olomouc Under 18 (U18) team. On December 17, he was hired as head coach of HC Oceláři Třinec, in the top level Czech Extraliga.

From 2016–17 to 2019–20, Dopita was head coach of VHK Vsetín; Vsetín was in the third level 2nd Czech Republic Hockey League (Czech 2. Liga) during his first season, earning a promotion to the second level 1st Czech Republic Hockey League (Czech 1. Liga) at season's end. The team stayed in Czech 1. Liga for the remainder of his time as head coach.

During his first year (2016–17) with VHK Vsetín, Dopita also served as head coach of the Czech National U19 team, and assistant coach of the Czech team at the 2017 World Junior Ice Hockey Championships (U20).

== Awards and achievements ==
- Olympic gold medal winner for the Czech Republic in the 1998 Winter Olympics in Nagano
- IIHF World Champion: 1996, 2000, 2001
- Golden Stick Award: 2001 (the highest trophy an ice hockey player can get in the Czech Republic)
- Czech Extraliga – Champion: 1994, 1996, 1997, 1998, 1999, 2001, 2005
- Czech Extraliga – Regular Season MVP: 1997, 1998, 1999, 2001
- Czech Extraliga – Play-Off MVP: 1994, 1996, 1998, 2001
- Czech Extraliga – Leading Goal Scorer: 1997, 2000
- German DEL – Leading Point Scorer: 1995

== Career statistics ==
=== Regular season and playoffs ===
			Regular season					Playoffs
Season	Team	League	GP	G	A	Pts	PIM	GP	G	A	Pts	PIM
1986–87	TJ Lokomotiva Šumperk	TCH U20	30	26	29	55	49	—	—	—	—	—
1987–88	TJ DS Olomouc	TCH U20	39	45	37	82	46	—	—	—	—	—
1987–88	TJ DS Olomouc	TCH.2	5	0	—	—	—	—	—	—	—	—
1988–89	TJ DS Olomouc	TCH.2	39	16	—	—	—	—	—	—	—	—
1989–90	ASD Dukla Jihlava	TCH	5	1	2	3	0	—	—	—	—	—
1989–90	HC VS VTJ Tábor	TCH.2	38	18	19	37	—	—	—	—	—	—
1990–91	TJ DS Olomouc	TCH	42	11	13	24	26	—	—	—	—	—
1991–92	TJ DS Olomouc	TCH	38	22	19	41	28	3	1	4	5	—
1992–93	HC Olomouc	TCH	28	12	17	29	16	—	—	—	—	—
1992–93	Eisbären Berlin	GER	11	7	8	15	49	—	—	—	—	—
1993–94	Eisbären Berlin	GER	42	23	21	44	52	4	4	4	8	8
1993–94	HC Olomouc	ELH	—	—	—	—	—	12	5	7	12	14
1994–95	Eisbären Berlin	DEL	42	28	40	68	55	—	—	—	—	—
1995–96	HC Petra Vsetín	ELH	38	19	21	40	20	13	9	10	19	10
1996–97	HC Petra Vsetín	ELH	51	30	31	61	58	10	7	4	11	12
1997–98	HC Petra Vsetín	ELH	50	21	33	54	60	10	12	6	18	4
1998–99	HC Slovnaft Vsetín	ELH	49	19	30	49	43	12	1	6	7	6
1999–00	HC Slovnaft Vsetín	ELH	49	30	29	59	85	9	0	4	4	6
2000–01	HC Slovnaft Vsetín	ELH	46	19	31	50	53	14	8	13	21	18
2001–02	Philadelphia Flyers	NHL	52	11	16	27	8	—	—	—	—	—
2002–03	Edmonton Oilers	NHL	21	1	5	6	11	—	—	—	—	—
2002–03	HC Olomouc	CZE.3	—	—	—	—	—	—	—	—	—	—
2003–04	HC Moeller Pardubice	ELH	47	20	28	48	44	7	1	9	10	4
2004–05	HC Moeller Pardubice	ELH	44	4	23	27	12	16	2	3	5	18
2005–06	HC JME Znojemští Orli	ELH	43	9	14	23	26	11	4	4	8	4
2006–07	HC Znojemští Orli	ELH	48	14	14	28	62	10	2	2	4	26
2007–08	HC Znojemští Orli	ELH	42	14	16	30	18	3	0	1	1	2
2008–09	HC Znojemští Orli	ELH	40	10	21	31	8	—	—	—	—	—
2009–10	HC Kometa Brno	ELH	51	20	21	41	10	—	—	—	—	—
2010–11	HC Kometa Brno	ELH	26	3	4	7	0	—	—	—	—	—
2011–12	HC Olomouc	CZE.2	32	8	14	22	22	14	1	5	6	12
2012–13	HC Olomouc	CZE.2	7	1	3	4	2	4	0	1	1	4
TCH totals			113	46	51	97	60	3	1	4	5	—
ELH totals			624	232	316	548	517	127	51	69	120	124
NHL totals			73	12	21	33	19	—	—	—	—	—

=== International ===
Year	Team	Event	GP	G	A	Pts	PIM
1994	Czech Republic	WC	3	1	0	1	0
1995	Czech Republic	WC	8	1	1	2	4
1996	Czech Republic	WC	6	1	2	3	2
1996	Czech Republic	WCH	2	1	0	1	2
1997	Czech Republic	WC	9	3	1	4	2
1998	Czech Republic	OLY	6	1	2	3	0
1998	Czech Republic	WC	8	3	1	4	6
2000	Czech Republic	WC	9	4	7	11	16
2001	Czech Republic	WC	9	2	1	3	4
2002	Czech Republic	OLY	4	2	2	4	2
2004	Czech Republic	WC	7	1	2	3	2
2004	Czech Republic	WCH	5	0	1	1	0
Senior totals			76	20	20	40	40

Awards
Preceded by Jaromír Jágr	Golden Hockey Stick; 2001	Succeeded by Jaromír Jágr
