= Golden Hockey Stick =

Czech ice hockey award

The Golden Hockey Stick (Czech: Zlatá hokejka) is an award given to the top Czech ice hockey player. It was originally awarded to the top player in the Czechoslovak First Ice Hockey League, beginning in the 1968–69 season. After the Czech Republic and Slovakia became separate countries in 1993, it was awarded to the top Czech player anywhere in the world.

Jaromír Jágr has won this award 12 times, more than any other player. David Pastrňák has won it seven times.

== Winners (team in brackets) ==
- 1969: Jan Suchý (Dukla Jihlava)
- 1970: Jan Suchý (Dukla Jihlava)
- 1971: František Pospíšil (Poldi SONP Kladno)
- 1972: František Pospíšil
- 1973: Vladimír Martinec (Tesla Pardubice)
- 1974: Jiří Holeček (Sparta Prague)
- 1975: Vladimír Martinec (Tesla Pardubice)
- 1976: Vladimír Martinec (Tesla Pardubice)
- 1977: Milan Nový (Poldi SONP Kladno)
- 1978: Ivan Hlinka (TJ CHZJD Litvínov)
- 1979: Vladimír Martinec (Tesla Pardubice)
- 1980: Peter Šťastný (Slovan Bratislava)
- 1981: Milan Nový (Poldi SONP Kladno)
- 1982: Milan Nový (Poldi SONP Kladno)
- 1983: Vincent Lukáč (TJ VSŽ Košice)
- 1984: Igor Liba (Dukla Jihlava)
- 1985: Jiří Králík (TJ Gottwaldov)
- 1986: Vladimír Růžička (TJ CHZJD Litvínov)
- 1987: Dominik Hašek (Tesla Pardubice)
- 1988: Vladimír Růžička (VHK Dukla Trenčín)
- 1989: Dominik Hašek (Tesla Pardubice)
- 1990: Dominik Hašek (Dukla Jihlava)
- 1991: Bedřich Ščerban (Dukla Jihlava)
- 1992: Róbert Švehla (Dukla Trenčín)
- 1993: Miloš Holaň (HC Vítkovice)
- 1994: Roman Turek (HC České Budějovice)
- 1995: Jaromír Jágr (Pittsburgh Penguins)
- 1996: Jaromír Jágr (Pittsburgh Penguins)
- 1997: Dominik Hašek (Buffalo Sabres)
- 1998: Dominik Hašek (Buffalo Sabres)
- 1999: Jaromír Jágr (Pittsburgh Penguins)
- 2000: Jaromír Jágr (Pittsburgh Penguins)
- 2001: Jiří Dopita (HC Vsetín)
- 2002: Jaromír Jágr (Washington Capitals)
- 2003: Milan Hejduk (Colorado Avalanche)
- 2004: Robert Lang (Detroit Red Wings)
- 2005: Jaromír Jágr (HC Kladno, Avangard Omsk)
- 2006: Jaromír Jágr (New York Rangers)
- 2007: Jaromír Jágr (New York Rangers)
- 2008: Jaromír Jágr (New York Rangers)
- 2009: Patrik Eliáš (New Jersey Devils)
- 2010: Tomáš Vokoun (Florida Panthers)
- 2011: Jaromír Jágr (Avangard Omsk)
- 2012: Patrik Eliáš (New Jersey Devils)
- 2013: David Krejčí (Boston Bruins)
- 2014: Jaromír Jágr (New Jersey Devils)
- 2015: Jakub Voráček (Philadelphia Flyers)
- 2016: Jaromír Jágr (Florida Panthers)
- 2017: David Pastrňák (Boston Bruins)
- 2018: David Pastrňák (Boston Bruins)
- 2019: David Pastrňák (Boston Bruins)
- 2020: David Pastrňák (Boston Bruins)
- 2021: David Pastrňák (Boston Bruins)
- 2022: Ondřej Palát (Tampa Bay Lightning)
- 2023: David Pastrňák (Boston Bruins)
- 2024: David Pastrňák (Boston Bruins)
- 2025: David Pastrňák (Boston Bruins)
- 2026: Martin Nečas (Colorado Avalanche)

== Sources ==
- The Highest Competition in Czech Republic and Czechoslovakia
