= Jiří Králík =

Czech ice hockey player

- Born: 11 April 1952 (age 74) Gottwaldov, Czechoslovakia
- Height: 175 cm (5 ft 9 in)
- Weight: 75 kg (165 lb; 11 st 11 lb)
- Position: Goaltender
- Catches: Left
- National team: Czechoslovakia

Olympic medal record

Representing Czechoslovakia

Men's Ice hockey
Silver medal – second place	1984 Sarajevo	Team

World Championships
Silver medal – second place	1979 Soviet Union	
Silver medal – second place	1982 Finland	
Silver medal – second place	1983 West Germany	
Gold medal – first place	1985 Czechoslovakia	

Canada Cup
Bronze medal – third place	1981 Canada	

Jiří Králík (born 11 April 1952) is a Czech retired professional ice hockey goaltender who played in the Czechoslovak Extraliga. He played for HC Jihlava. He was a member of the Czechoslovak 1981 Canada Cup teams and was a silver medalist at the 1984 Winter Olympics. He was named as a first team all star at the 1982 and 1985 International Ice Hockey Championships.

== Winter Olympic Games history ==
Year	WINTER OLYMPICS	Location	Rank	Medal
1980	XIII Olympic Winter Games	Lake Placid, New York	5th	
1984	XIV Olympic Winter Games	Sarajevo, Yugoslavia	2nd	Silver medal

Awards
Preceded by Igor Liba	Golden Hockey Stick; 1985	Succeeded by Vladimír Růžička
