= Bedřich Ščerban =

Czech ice hockey player

- Born: 31 May 1964 (age 62) Jihlava, Czechoslovakia
- Height: 5 ft 8 in (173 cm)
- Weight: 176 lb (80 kg; 12 st 8 lb)
- Position: Defence
- Shot: Right
- Played for: HC Dukla Jihlava; Tappara; Brynäs IF; VHK Vsetín; Essen Mosquitoes; Wölfe Freiburg
- National team: Czechoslovakia and Czech Republic
- Playing career: 1983–2008
Medal record
Men's Ice hockey
Bronze medal – third place	1992 Albertville	Ice hockey

Bedřich Ščerban (born 31 May 1964) is a Czech former professional ice hockey defenceman. He competed at three Winter Olympics.

== Career ==
Ščerban began his career with HC Dukla Jihlava of the Czech Extraliga in 1986. In 1991, he moved to Finland's SM-liiga, spending one season with Tappara before moving the Sweden's Elitserien with Brynäs IF. He returned to the Czech Republic in 1996, splitting the year with VHK Vsetín and a second period with Dukla Jihlava. He spent the next seven seasons in Germany, playing for the Essen Mosquitoes and EHC Freiburg. He returned to the Czech Republic in 2004, spending his final seasons playing in the 1st Czech Republic Hockey League for HC Berounští Medvědi, SK Horácká Slavia Třebíč and a third spell with Jihlava before retiring in 2008.

Ščerban played on 1992 Bronze Medal winning Olympic Hockey team for Czechoslovakia.

== Career statistics ==
=== Regular season and playoffs ===
			Regular season					Playoffs
Season	Team	League	GP	G	A	Pts	PIM	GP	G	A	Pts	PIM
1983–84	ASD Dukla Jihlava	TCH	2	0	0	0	2	—	—	—	—	—
1984–85	ASD Dukla Jihlava	TCH	43	2	6	8	10	—	—	—	—	—
1986–87	ASD Dukla Jihlava	TCH	41	3	7	10	26	—	—	—	—	—
1987–88	ASD Dukla Jihlava	TCH	43	5	9	14	—	—	—	—	—	—
1988–89	ASD Dukla Jihlava	TCH	46	4	15	19	18	—	—	—	—	—
1989–90	ASD Dukla Jihlava	TCH	45	8	10	18	—	—	—	—	—	—
1990–91	ASD Dukla Jihlava	TCH	57	11	12	23	16	—	—	—	—	—
1991–92	Tappara	Liiga	43	4	3	7	18	—	—	—	—	—
1992–93	Brynäs IF	SEL	37	5	13	18	36	10	1	6	7	6
1993–94	Brynäs IF	SEL	40	6	12	18	26	7	1	3	4	6
1994–95	Brynäs IF	SEL	40	4	9	13	26	14	4	5	9	12
1995–96	Brynäs IF	SEL	22	0	4	4	14	—	—	—	—	—
1995–96	Brynäs IF	Allsv	17	3	10	13	14	9	3	3	6	4
1996–97	HC Petra Vsetín	ELH	16	2	2	4	4	—	—	—	—	—
1996–97	HC Dukla Jihlava	ELH	25	1	5	6	18	—	—	—	—	—
1997–98	ESC Moskitos Essen	DEU II	62	14	38	52	48	—	—	—	—	—
1998–99	ESC Moskitos Essen	DEU II	56	6	38	44	30	11	2	3	5	20
1999–2000	Moskitos Essen	DEL	53	3	16	19	40	—	—	—	—	—
2000–01	EHC Freiburg	DEU II	41	7	34	41	38	2	0	2	2	8
2001–02	EHC Freiburg	DEU II	62	9	47	56	44	—	—	—	—	—
2002–03	EHC Freiburg	DEU II	56	7	49	56	34	12	4	10	14	4
2003–04	Wölfe Freiburg	DEL	23	0	10	10	16	—	—	—	—	—
2004–05	HC Berounští Medvědi	CZE II	12	1	2	3	4	—	—	—	—	—
2004–05	SK Horácká Slavia Třebíč	CZE II	25	0	1	1	18	—	—	—	—	—
2005–06	SK Horácká Slavia Třebíč	CZE II	51	3	16	19	46	—	—	—	—	—
2006–07	SK Horácká Slavia Třebíč	CZE II	51	8	23	31	52	5	0	1	1	12
2007–08	HC Dukla Jihlava	CZE II	23	1	6	7	22	—	—	—	—	—
TCH totals			277	33	59	92	72	—	—	—	—	—
SEL totals			139	15	38	53	102	31	6	14	20	24
DEU II totals			277	43	206	249	194	25	6	15	21	32

=== International ===
Year	Team	Event	GP	G	A	Pts	PIM
1987	Czechoslovakia	WC	10	0	2	2	14
1987	Czechoslovakia	CC	6	0	0	0	2
1988	Czechoslovakia	OG	8	0	3	3	2
1989	Czechoslovakia	WC	10	3	3	6	4
1990	Czechoslovakia	WC	10	0	1	1	12
1991	Czechoslovakia	WC	10	0	3	3	4
1992	Czechoslovakia	OG	6	0	1	1	0
1992	Czechoslovakia	WC	8	1	0	1	0
1993	Czech Republic	WC	8	0	0	0	2
1994	Czech Republic	OG	8	0	1	1	10
1994	Czech Republic	WC	6	0	0	0	4
1995	Czech Republic	WC	8	0	2	2	8
Senior totals			98	4	16	20	62

Awards
Preceded by Dominik Hašek	Golden Hockey Stick; 1991	Succeeded by Robert Svehla
