= Robert Lang (ice hockey) =

Czech ice hockey player (born 1970)

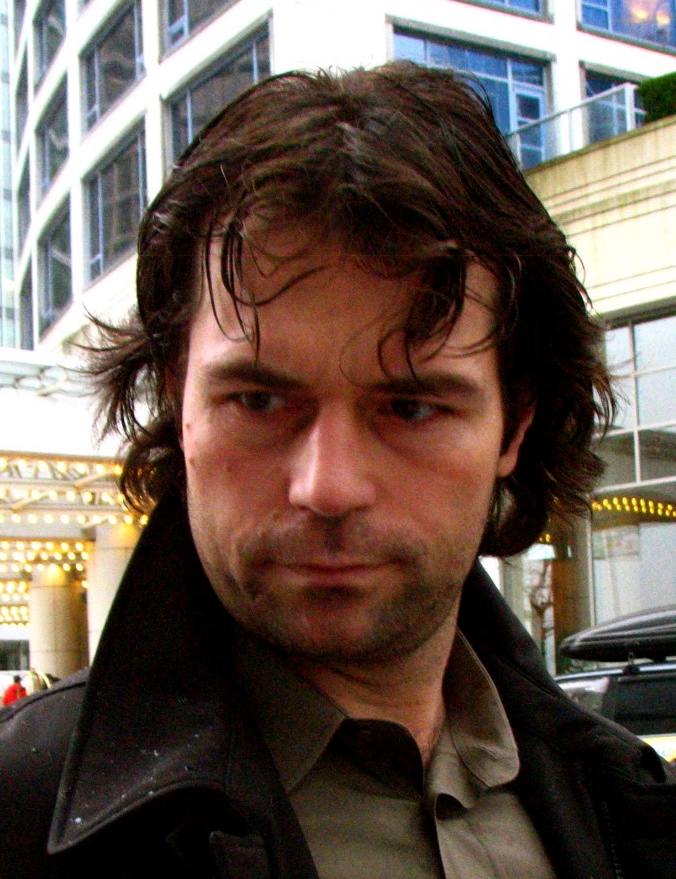
- Born: December 19, 1970 (age 55) Teplice, Czechoslovakia
- Height: 6 ft 3 in (191 cm)
- Weight: 216 lb (98 kg; 15 st 6 lb)
- Position: Centre
- Shot: Right
- Played for: HC Litvínov; Los Angeles Kings; HC Sparta Praha; Boston Bruins; Pittsburgh Penguins; Washington Capitals; Detroit Red Wings; Chicago Blackhawks; Montreal Canadiens; Phoenix Coyotes
- National team: Czechoslovakia and Czech Republic
- NHL draft: 133rd overall, 1990; Los Angeles Kings
- Playing career: 1988–2010

Robert Lang (born December 19, 1970) is a Czech former professional ice hockey player. Selected by the Los Angeles Kings of the National Hockey League (NHL) in the fifth round, 133rd overall, of the 1990 NHL entry draft, Lang made his NHL debut with the team in the 1992–93 season. He has also played for the Boston Bruins, Pittsburgh Penguins, Washington Capitals, Detroit Red Wings, Chicago Blackhawks, Montreal Canadiens and Phoenix Coyotes, with whom he retired with in 2010.

Internationally, Lang played for both the Czechoslovak and Czech national teams, competing in four Winter Olympics (winning gold in 1998), three Ice Hockey World Championships and two World Cups.

== Playing career ==
A native of Czechoslovakia, Lang began his career in the Czechoslovak Extraliga as an eighteen-year-old with HC Litvínov. After scoring 15 points in 32 games in 1989–90, his second season with HC Litvínov, he was drafted 133rd overall by the Los Angeles Kings in the 1990 NHL entry draft.

Lang returned to play another two seasons in the Extraliga before debuting with the Kings in 1992–93. He played the majority of his first two seasons in the International Hockey League (IHL) with the Kings' minor league affiliate, the Phoenix Roadrunners.

Due to the lockout-shortened 1994–95 season, Lang returned to HC Litvínov (now of the Czech Extraliga) for 16 games, scoring 23 points. When NHL play resumed, he landed a full-time roster spot with the Kings. He tallied 22 points in 68 games in 1995–96 before returning to the Czech Extraliga to play for Sparta Praha.

After a brief hiatus from the NHL, Lang returned after one season in Europe, joining the Pittsburgh Penguins as a free agent on September 2, 1997. He was subsequently bounced back and forth between the Penguins and Boston Bruins for a couple of months before he stuck with the Penguins.

Lang remained with the Penguins, joining fellow Czech Jaromír Jágr and increasing his points total in each of his first four seasons with the team. In 2000–01, he scored a career-high 32 goals, 48 assists and 80 points in 82 games. That season, the Penguins reached the Eastern Conference Finals, but were defeated in five games by the New Jersey Devils. Lang added eight points in 16 playoff games.

After the 2001–02 season, Lang became an unrestricted free agent and signed with the Washington Capitals. In Washington, he was re-united with Jágr, who had been traded to the Capitals the year before. He scored 69 points in his first season with Washington, second in team scoring to Jágr.

During the 2003–04 season, Lang was enjoying another career year and recorded his first career hat-trick on November 12, 2003. He was leading the NHL in scoring when he was traded to the Stanley Cup-contending Detroit Red Wings for prospect Tomáš Fleischmann, a first-round draft pick (Mike Green) in 2004 and a fourth-round pick in 2006. This marked the first time in NHL history that a player was traded while leading the NHL in points. Shortly after the trade, he was sidelined with a broken rib on March 8. Missing 13 games, he surrendered the NHL scoring lead to the Tampa Bay Lightning's Martin St. Louis and finished with 79 points in 69 games, one point shy of his career-high set in 2000–01 and ninth overall in the League. (Lang's points-per-game of 1.14 was identical to St. Louis'.) Lang returned to the Red Wings in time for the 2004 playoffs, but the team was eliminated by the Calgary Flames in the second round. He recorded a career-high nine points in 12 playoff games.

In addition to Lang's ninth-place finish in NHL scoring, he had participated in his first NHL All-Star in 2004 and was also awarded the Golden Hockey Stick as the top Czech hockey player at the end of the season.

Lang remained with the Red Wings until the end of the 2006–07 season, but his production dipped each of his remaining campaign in Detroit. Before signing a two-year contract with the Chicago Blackhawks as an unrestricted free agent in the off-season, Lang embarked on another playoff run with the Red Wings in 2007, but they were halted by the eventual Stanley Cup champions Anaheim Ducks in the semifinals. Lang recorded eight points in 18 playoff games.

In Chicago, Lang recorded 54 points playing behind rookie standouts Jonathan Toews and Patrick Kane; Lang finished fourth in team scoring. After just one season with the Blackhawks, he was traded to the Montreal Canadiens for a second-round draft pick in 2010 (previously acquired from the Toronto Maple Leafs) on September 12, 2008.

Lang recorded a natural hat-trick, the second three-goal effort of his career, in his first season with the Canadiens, against the New York Rangers on January 7, 2009, in a 6–3 win. He scored his three goals on the power play, even-strength and short-handed in an empty net. Having played 50 straight games for the Canadiens, leading them in goal scoring, power play points and second on the team in overall points, Lang suffered an achilles tendon injury, sidelining him for the remainder of the regular season.

On September 29, 2009, Lang was signed by the Phoenix Coyotes to a one-year contract, just days before the start of the 2009–10 season. During the season, Lang recorded 29 points in 64 regular season games while missing the last 17 games of the regular season due to a lower-body injury. His offensive contribution and veteran leadership helped lead the Coyotes to their first playoff berth since the 2001–02 season. The Coyotes were defeated by the Red Wings in seven games in the first round of the 2010 Stanley Cup playoffs. Lang played in four of the seven games, recording one assist.

== International play ==
Medal record

Representing Czechoslovakia

Men's ice hockey

World Championships
| Bronze medal – third place | 1992 Czechoslovakia | |

Winter Olympics
| Bronze medal – third place | 1992 Albertville | |

Representing Czech Republic

World Championships
| Gold medal – first place | 1996 Austria | |
| Bronze medal – third place | 1997 Finland | |

Winter Olympics
| Gold medal – first place | 1998 Nagano | |
| Bronze medal – third place | 2006 Turin | |

Lang debuted internationally with Czechoslovakia in the 1992 Winter Olympics. Lang scored 13 points in eight games, third in tournament scoring, as Czechoslovakia defeated the United States in the bronze medal game. That same year, Lang competed for Czechoslovakia in the 1992 World Championships, held in his home country. Scoring four points in eight games, Lang captured his second bronze medal with Czechoslovakia.

In 1996, Lang competed with the recently independent Czech Republic in his second World Championships and won the country's first gold medal at the tournament (Czechoslovakia had won six times previously). Lang scored nine points in eight games. Later that year, Lang competed in the inaugural World Cup (replacing the Canada Cup), however the Czechs lost all three round-robin games and did not advance to the medal rounds. Lang failed to register a point.

The following year, Lang competed in the 1997 World Championships, defeating Russia in the bronze medal game. Lang scored two points in eight games.

In 1998, Lang competed in his second Winter Olympics, capturing gold on a team with Dominik Hašek and Pittsburgh Penguins teammate Jaromír Jágr. He scored two points in six games as the Czechs defeated Canada in the semifinals, then Russia in the final.

Four years later, Lang once again suited up for the Czechs in the 2002 Winter Olympics in Salt Lake City. Lang scored three points in four games, but the Czechs were kept from defending their gold medal, falling to Russia in the quarterfinals.

In 2004, Lang saw his only hockey action of the 2004–05 season at the World Cup due to the NHL lockout. The Czechs were defeated 4–3 in overtime in the semifinals against Canada.

Competing in his fourth Olympics, Lang tallied four assists in eight games as team captain in the 2006 Winter Olympics in Turin as the Czechs returned to the Olympic medal podium, capturing bronze against Russia. It would prove to be his last Olympics, as, at the age of 39, he would not be invited back for a fifth turn during the 2010 Winter Olympics, despite still playing in the NHL. The Czechs finished fifth, failing to reach the medal podium.

== Personal life ==
Former Detroit Red Wings teammate (and fellow Czech) Jiří Hudler spent time living in Lang's home as Lang took him under his wing during his time in Detroit. Lang refers to Hudler as his "third son."

Lang resides in San Diego, California, with his wife Jennifer. The couple have two sons, Kelly and Brooks.

== Awards and achievements ==
- NHL All-Star Game – 2004
- Golden Hockey Stick (best Czech hockey player) – 2004
- Lang was inducted into the Czech Ice Hockey Hall of Fame on December 17, 2015.

== Transactions ==
- June 16, 1990 – Drafted 133rd overall by the Los Angeles Kings in the 1990 NHL entry draft.
- September 2, 1997 – Signed as a free agent by the Pittsburgh Penguins.
- September 28, 1997 – Claimed by the Boston Bruins from the Pittsburgh Penguins in the 1997 NHL Waiver Draft.
- October 25, 1997 – Claimed off waivers by the Pittsburgh Penguins from the Boston Bruins.
- July 1, 2002 – Signed as a free agent by the Washington Capitals.
- February 27, 2004 – Traded to the Detroit Red Wings from the Washington Capitals for Tomáš Fleischmann, a first-round draft choice (Mike Green) in 2004 and a fourth-round draft choice (Luke Lynes) in 2006.
- July 2, 2007 – Signed to a two-year contract by the Chicago Blackhawks.
- September 12, 2008 – Traded to the Montreal Canadiens by the Chicago Blackhawks in exchange for a second-round draft pick in 2010 (previously acquired from the Toronto Maple Leafs).

== Career statistics ==
=== Regular season and playoffs ===
| | | | Regular season | | | | | Playoffs |
| Season | Team | League | GP | G | A | Pts | PIM | GP | G | A | Pts | PIM |
|---|---|---|---|---|---|---|---|---|---|---|---|---|
| 1988–89 | TJ CHZ Litvínov | CSSR | 7 | 3 | 2 | 5 | 0 | — | — | — | — | — |
| 1989–90 | TJ CHZ Litvínov | CSSR | 32 | 8 | 7 | 15 | — | 8 | 3 | 3 | 6 | 0 |
| 1990–91 | TJ CHZ Litvínov | CSSR | 56 | 26 | 26 | 52 | 38 | — | — | — | — | — |
| 1991–92 | HC Chemopetrol Litvínov | CSSR | 43 | 12 | 31 | 43 | 34 | — | — | — | — | — |
| 1992–93 | Los Angeles Kings | NHL | 11 | 0 | 5 | 5 | 2 | — | — | — | — | — |
| 1992–93 | Phoenix Roadrunners | IHL | 38 | 9 | 21 | 30 | 20 | — | — | — | — | — |
| 1993–94 | Los Angeles Kings | NHL | 32 | 9 | 10 | 19 | 10 | — | — | — | — | — |
| 1993–94 | Phoenix Roadrunners | IHL | 44 | 11 | 24 | 35 | 34 | — | — | — | — | — |
| 1994–95 | HC Chemopetrol Litvínov | CZE | 16 | 4 | 19 | 23 | 28 | — | — | — | — | — |
| 1994–95 | Los Angeles Kings | NHL | 36 | 4 | 8 | 12 | 4 | — | — | — | — | — |
| 1995–96 | Los Angeles Kings | NHL | 68 | 6 | 16 | 22 | 10 | — | — | — | — | — |
| 1996–97 | HC Sparta Praha | CZE | 38 | 14 | 27 | 41 | 30 | 5 | 1 | 2 | 3 | 4 |
| 1997–98 | Boston Bruins | NHL | 3 | 0 | 0 | 0 | 2 | — | — | — | — | — |
| 1997–98 | Pittsburgh Penguins | NHL | 51 | 9 | 13 | 22 | 14 | 6 | 0 | 3 | 3 | 2 |
| 1997–98 | Houston Aeros | IHL | 9 | 1 | 7 | 8 | 4 | — | — | — | — | — |
| 1998–99 | Pittsburgh Penguins | NHL | 72 | 21 | 23 | 44 | 24 | 12 | 0 | 2 | 2 | 0 |
| 1999–00 | Pittsburgh Penguins | NHL | 78 | 23 | 42 | 65 | 14 | 11 | 3 | 3 | 6 | 0 |
| 2000–01 | Pittsburgh Penguins | NHL | 82 | 32 | 48 | 80 | 28 | 16 | 4 | 4 | 8 | 4 |
| 2001–02 | Pittsburgh Penguins | NHL | 62 | 18 | 32 | 50 | 16 | — | — | — | — | — |
| 2002–03 | Washington Capitals | NHL | 82 | 22 | 47 | 69 | 22 | 6 | 2 | 1 | 3 | 2 |
| 2003–04 | Washington Capitals | NHL | 63 | 29 | 45 | 74 | 24 | — | — | — | — | — |
| 2003–04 | Detroit Red Wings | NHL | 6 | 1 | 4 | 5 | 0 | 12 | 4 | 5 | 9 | 6 |
| 2005–06 | Detroit Red Wings | NHL | 72 | 20 | 42 | 62 | 72 | 6 | 3 | 3 | 6 | 2 |
| 2006–07 | Detroit Red Wings | NHL | 81 | 19 | 33 | 52 | 66 | 18 | 2 | 6 | 8 | 8 |
| 2007–08 | Chicago Blackhawks | NHL | 76 | 21 | 33 | 54 | 50 | — | — | — | — | — |
| 2008–09 | Montreal Canadiens | NHL | 50 | 18 | 21 | 39 | 36 | — | — | — | — | — |
| 2009–10 | Phoenix Coyotes | NHL | 62 | 9 | 20 | 29 | 28 | 4 | 0 | 1 | 1 | 0 |
| CSSR totals | | | 138 | 49 | 66 | 115 | 72 | 8 | 3 | 3 | 6 | 0 |
| NHL totals | | | 987 | 261 | 442 | 703 | 422 | 91 | 18 | 28 | 46 | 24 |

=== International ===
| Year | Team | Event | GP | G | A | Pts | PIM |
|---|---|---|---|---|---|---|---|
| 1992 | Czechoslovakia | OLY | 8 | 5 | 8 | 13 | 8 |
| 1992 | Czechoslovakia | WC | 8 | 2 | 2 | 4 | 2 |
| 1996 | Czech Republic | WC | 8 | 5 | 4 | 9 | 2 |
| 1996 | Czech Republic | WCH | 3 | 0 | 0 | 0 | 2 |
| 1997 | Czech Republic | WC | 8 | 1 | 1 | 2 | 25 |
| 1998 | Czech Republic | OLY | 6 | 0 | 3 | 3 | 0 |
| 2002 | Czech Republic | OLY | 4 | 1 | 2 | 3 | 2 |
| 2006 | Czech Republic | OLY | 8 | 0 | 4 | 4 | 4 |
| Senior totals | | | 53 | 14 | 24 | 38 | 43 |

| Preceded by Milan Hejduk | Golden Hockey Stick; 2004 | Succeeded by Jaromír Jágr |
