= Miroslav Dvořák =

Miroslav Dvořák may refer to:

- Miroslav Dvořák (ice hockey) (1951–2008), Czech ice hockey player
- Miroslav Dvořák (skier) (born 1987), Czech Nordic combined skier
