= Jan Suchý =

Czech ice hockey player (1944–2021)

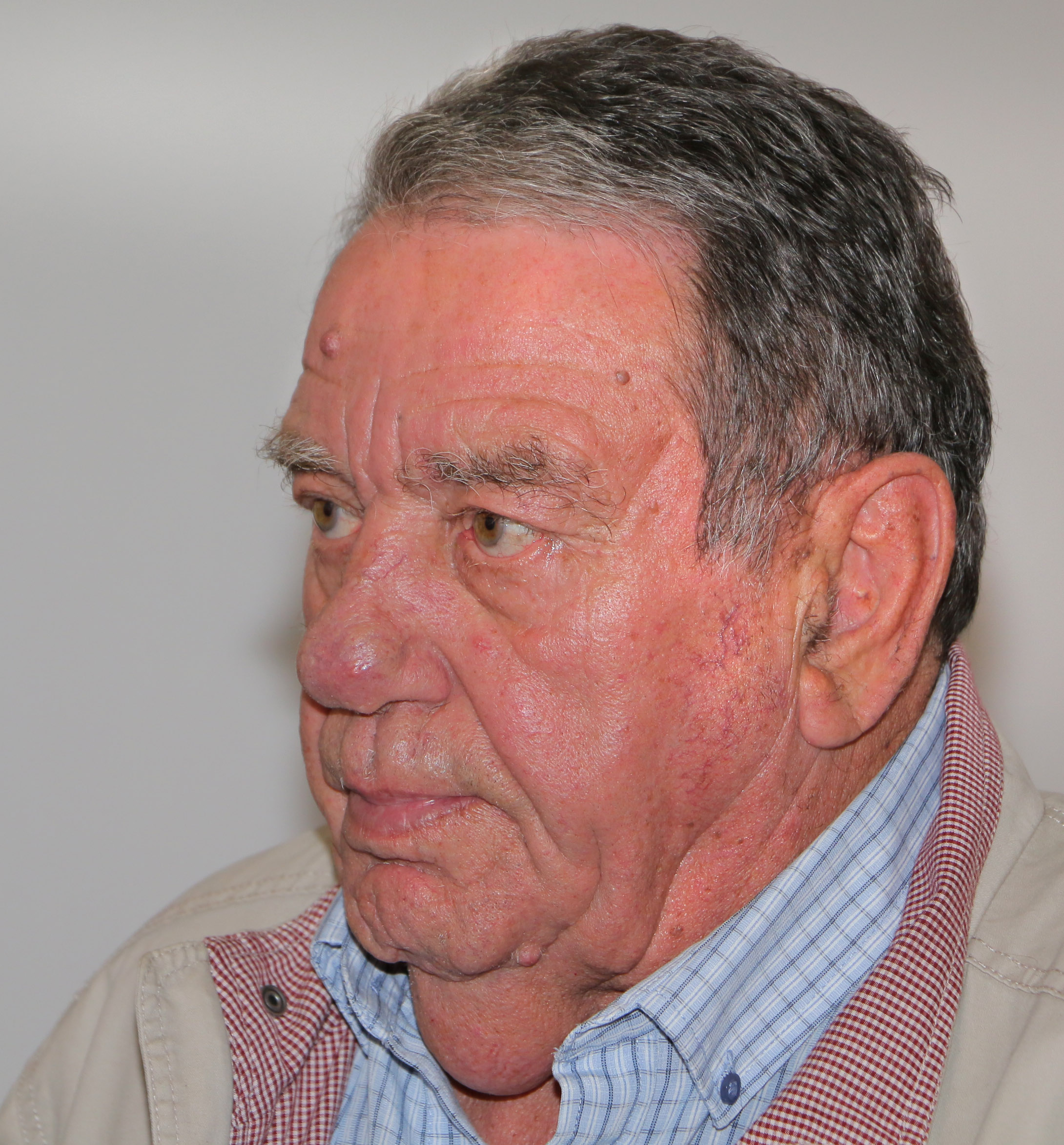
- Suchý in 2018
- Born: 10 October 1944 Německý Brod, Protectorate of Bohemia and Moravia
- Died: 24 August 2021 (aged 76)
- Height: 5 ft 9 in (175 cm)
- Weight: 170 lb (77 kg; 12 st 2 lb)
- Position: Defence
- Shot: Left
- Played for: Dukla Jihlava
- National team: Czechoslovakia
- Playing career: 1961–1982
Medal record
Representing Czechoslovakia
Men's ice hockey
Olympic Games
Silver medal – second place	1968 Grenoble	Team
World Championships
Silver medal – second place	1965 Tampere	Team
Silver medal – second place	1966 Ljubljana	Team
Silver medal – second place	1971 Bern/Geneva	Team
Silver medal – second place	1974 Helsinki	Team
Bronze medal – third place	1969 Stockholm	Team
Bronze medal – third place	1970 Stockholm	Team
Bronze medal – third place	1973 Moscow	Team

Jan Suchý (10 October 1944 – 24 August 2021) was a Czech ice hockey player. He played for the Czechoslovakia men's national team at the Ice Hockey World Championships and the Winter Olympic Games, and was inducted into the IIHF Hall of Fame.

== Biography ==
Suchý was born on 10 October 1944 in Havlíčkův Brod (that time known as Německý Brod). From the ages of 8 to 19, Suchý played for a local team, Jiskra Havlíčkův Brod. He then played for the Czechoslovak Army team Dukla Jihlava from 1963 to 1979, during which time he helped them win seven Czechoslovak league titles. By his last season he had scored more goals than any defenceman in league history. He then continued to play in Austria and Germany until 1984.

He played in the Czechoslovakia national team in the world championships of 1965, 1966, 1968 (Note: The 1968 Olympic ice hockey tournament doubled as the world championships.)–71, 1973 and 1974, scoring 22 goals in 68 games, and winning four silver medals and three bronze medals. He also played in the ice hockey tournament of the 1968 Winter Olympics, winning a silver medal with his team.

Suchý won the first two Golden Hockey Stick awards as Czechoslovakia's best player in 1969 and 1970. He was named the best defenceman at the ice hockey world championships in 1969 and 1971.

He was also the first European to be placed on an NHL protected list (by the Boston Bruins).

Suchý was inducted into the IIHF Hall of Fame in 2009.

He died on 24 August 2021, at the age of 76.

== Notes ==
Awards
Preceded by none	Golden Hockey Stick; 1969, 1970	Succeeded by František Pospíšil
