= 1983–84 IIHF European Cup =

Ice Hockey tournament

The 1983–84 European Cup was the 19th edition of the European Cup, IIHF's premier European club ice hockey tournament. The season started on October 5, 1983, and finished on August 12, 1984.

The tournament was won by CSKA Moscow, who won the final group.

== First round ==
Team #1	Score	Team #2
SC Saint-Gervais (France)	6–4, 8–4	(Hungary) Újpesti Dózsa
Rødovre SIK (Denmark)	12–3, 9–2	(United Kingdom) Dundee Rockets
Furuset (Norway)	5–8, 5–4	(Netherlands) Flyers Heerenveen
EHC Biel (Switzerland)	4–3, 9–7	(Socialist Federal Republic of Yugoslavia) HK Olimpija Ljubljana

(Austria) VEU Feldkirch, (Italy) HC Bolzano, (East Germany) Dynamo Berlin, (Sweden) Djurgårdens IF : bye

== Second round ==
Team #1	Score	Team #2
SC Saint-Gervais (France)	4–7, 2–2	(Italy) HC Bolzano
Rødovre SIK (Denmark)	2–12, 2–9	(East Germany) Dynamo Berlin
Flyers Heerenveen (Netherlands)	0–13, 2–15	(Sweden) Djurgårdens IF
VEU Feldkirch (Austria)	9–5, 2–3	(Switzerland) EHC Biel

(Finland) HIFK, (West Germany) EV Landshut, (Czechoslovakia) Dukla Jihlava, (Soviet Union) CSKA Moscow : bye

== Third round ==
Team #1	Score	Team #2
HC Bolzano (Italy)	1–12, 2–11	(Soviet Union) CSKA Moscow
Dynamo Berlin (East Germany)	7–3, 2–4	(Finland) HIFK
Djurgårdens IF (Sweden)	5–1, w/o	(West Germany) EV Landshut
VEU Feldkirch (Austria)	6–7, 3–7	(Czechoslovakia) Dukla Jihlava

== Final Group ==
(Urtijëi, Italy)

Team #1	Score	Team #2
Dukla Jihlava (Czechoslovakia)	7–2	(East Germany) Dynamo Berlin
CSKA Moscow (Soviet Union)	5–0	(Sweden) Djurgårdens IF
CSKA Moscow (Soviet Union)	4–3	(East Germany) Dynamo Berlin
Dukla Jihlava (Czechoslovakia)	3–1	(Sweden) Djurgårdens IF
Dynamo Berlin (East Germany)	5–3	(Sweden) Djurgårdens IF
CSKA Moscow (Soviet Union)	4–3	(Czechoslovakia) Dukla Jihlava

=== Final group standings ===
Rank	Team	Points
1	(Soviet Union) CSKA Moscow	6
2	(Czechoslovakia) Dukla Jihlava	4
3	(East Germany) Dynamo Berlin	2
4	(Sweden) Djurgårdens IF	0
