= 1970–71 IIHF European Cup =

European ice hockey tournament

The 1970–71 European Cup was the sixth edition of the European Cup, IIHF's premier European club ice hockey tournament. The season started in October 1970 and finished on September 4, 1971.

The tournament was won by CSKA Moscow, who beat Dukla Jihlava in the final

== First round ==
Team #1	Score	Team #2
HIFK (Finland)	4:2, 4:0	(Poland) GKS Katowice
HC Chamonix (France)	3:5, 1:6	(Austria) EC KAC
KSF København (Denmark)	3:7, 1:5	(Hungary) Újpesti Dózsa
Vålerenga (Norway)	2:5, 2:7	(East Germany) SG Dynamo Weißwasser
HK Jesenice (Socialist Federal Republic of Yugoslavia)	13:3, 10:2	(Bulgaria) HK Krakra Pernik
SG Cortina (Italy)	3:4, 2:5	(West Germany) EV Landshut*

* (West Germany) EV Landshut was disqualified after it was determined that their players Rudolf Hejtmánek and Josef Cvach were not eligible to play, having defected from communist Czechoslovakia during the Prague Spring in 1968 without having been released by their Czechoslovak teams.

(Sweden) Brynäs IF, (Switzerland) HC La Chaux-de-Fonds : bye

== Second round ==
Team #1	Score	Team #2
HK Jesenice (Socialist Federal Republic of Yugoslavia)	2:5, 3:7	(East Germany) SG Dynamo Weißwasser
HIFK (Finland)	4:4, 2:7	(Sweden) Brynäs IF
Újpesti Dózsa (Hungary)	3:1, 5:7 (1:3 PS)	(Italy) SG Cortina
HC La Chaux-de-Fonds (Switzerland)	1:2, 1:2	(Austria) EC KAC

== Third round ==
Team #1	Score	Team #2
SG Cortina (Italy)	6:1, 0:3	(Austria) EC KAC
SG Dynamo Weißwasser (East Germany)	3:5, 5:12	(Sweden) Brynäs IF

(Czechoslovakia) Dukla Jihlava, (Soviet Union) CSKA Moscow : bye

== Semifinals ==
Team #1	Score	Team #2
SG Cortina (Italy)	4:6, 2:5	(Czechoslovakia) Dukla Jihlava
Brynäs IF (Sweden)	2:6, 4:6	(Soviet Union) CSKA Moscow

== Finals ==
Team #1	Score	Team #2
CSKA Moscow (Soviet Union)	7:0, 3:3	(Czechoslovakia) Dukla Jihlava
