= Róbert Švehla =

- Born: January 2, 1969 (age 57) Martin, Czechoslovakia
- Height: 6 ft 1 in (185 cm)
- Weight: 210 lb (95 kg; 15 st 0 lb)
- Position: Defence
- Shot: Right
- Played for: HK Dukla Trenčín; Malmö IF; Florida Panthers; Toronto Maple Leafs
- National team: Czechoslovakia and Slovakia
- NHL draft: 78th overall, 1992; Calgary Flames
- Playing career: 1990–2003

Róbert Švehla (/ˈsveɪlə/ SVAY-lə, Slovak: [ˈrɔːbert ˈʂʋeɦla]; born January 2, 1969) is a Slovak former professional ice hockey defenceman who played in the National Hockey League (NHL) for nine seasons from 1995 until 2003 for the Florida Panthers and Toronto Maple Leafs.

== Career ==
Švehla was drafted 78th overall by the Calgary Flames in the 1992 NHL entry draft, but he did not play a game for them before moving on to the Florida Panthers. Švehla played 8 seasons with the Panthers before moving to the Toronto Maple Leafs for his final season. Švehla played 655 career NHL games, scoring 68 goals and 267 assists for 335 points. His best offensive season was the 1995–96 season when he registered career highs in assists (49) and points (57).

== Career statistics ==
=== Regular season and playoffs ===
			Regular season					Playoffs
Season	Team	League	GP	G	A	Pts	PIM	GP	G	A	Pts	PIM
1989–90	ASVŠ Dukla Trenčín	CSSR	28	4	3	7	—	—	—	—	—	—
1990–91	ASVŠ Dukla Trenčín	CSSR	52	14	8	22	62	6	2	1	3	0
1991–92	ASVŠ Dukla Trenčín	CSSR	38	16	18	34	74	13	7	10	17	—
1992–93	Malmö IF	SEL	40	19	10	29	86	6	0	2	2	14
1993–94	Malmö IF	SEL	37	14	25	39	127	10	5	1	6	23
1994–95	Malmö IF	SEL	31	11	13	24	83	9	2	3	5	6
1994–95	Florida Panthers	NHL	5	1	1	2	0	—	—	—	—	—
1995–96	Florida Panthers	NHL	81	8	49	57	94	22	0	6	6	32
1996–97	Florida Panthers	NHL	82	13	32	45	86	5	1	4	5	4
1997–98	Florida Panthers	NHL	79	9	34	43	113	—	—	—	—	—
1998–99	Florida Panthers	NHL	80	8	29	37	83	—	—	—	—	—
1999–00	Florida Panthers	NHL	82	9	40	49	64	4	0	1	1	4
2000–01	Florida Panthers	NHL	82	6	22	28	76	—	—	—	—	—
2001–02	Florida Panthers	NHL	82	7	22	29	87	—	—	—	—	—
2002–03	Toronto Maple Leafs	NHL	82	7	38	45	46	7	0	3	3	2
NHL totals			655	68	267	335	649	38	1	14	15	42

=== International ===
Medal record

Representing Czechoslovakia

Men's ice hockey

European Junior Championships
Silver medal – second place	1987 Finland	

World Championships
Bronze medal – third place	1992 Czechoslovakia	

Winter Olympics
Bronze medal – third place	1992 Albertville	

Representing Slovakia

World Championships
Bronze medal – third place	2003 Finland	

Year	Team	Event	GP	G	A	Pts	PIM
1987	Czechoslovakia	EJC	7	2	2	4	2
1992	Czechoslovakia	OLY	8	2	1	3	8
1992	Czechoslovakia	WC	8	4	4	8	14
1994	Slovakia	OLY	8	2	4	6	26
1995	Slovakia	WC B	4	0	6	6	10
1996	Slovakia	WCH	3	0	3	3	4
1998	Slovakia	OLY	2	0	1	1	0
1998	Slovakia	WC	6	1	1	2	14
2003	Slovakia	WC	9	0	3	3	8
Junior totals			7	2	2	4	2
Senior totals			44	9	17	26	74

== Coaching career ==
On January 14, 2009, Švehla joined HC Dukla Trenčín and signed a contract as assistant coach.

Awards
Preceded by Bedřich Ščerban	Golden Hockey Stick; 1992	Succeeded by Milos Holan
