= 1966–67 Czechoslovak Extraliga season =

Season of the Czechoslovak Extraliga

The 1966–67 Czechoslovak Extraliga season was the 24th season of the Czechoslovak Extraliga, the top level of ice hockey in Czechoslovakia. 10 teams participated in the league, and Dukla Jihlava won the championship.

The champions scored the second-highest number of goals in the tournament (only behind the fourth-placed Slovan CHZJD Bratislava), and conceded the fewest goals among the 10 competing teams.

== Regular season ==
Pl.	Team	GP	W	T	L	GF–GA	Pts
1.	Dukla Jihlava	36	23	6	7	173:81	52
2.	Spartak ČKD Prag	36	22	5	9	163:121	49
3.	ZKL Brno	36	20	5	11	139:100	45
4.	Slovan CHZJD Bratislava	36	21	2	13	180:123	44
5.	Tesla Pardubice	36	18	4	14	142:134	40
6.	Dukla Košice	36	16	4	16	120:131	36
7.	TJ SONP Kladno	36	10	6	20	126:160	26
8.	TJ Gottwaldov	36	12	2	22	111:150	26
9.	CHZ Litvínov	36	10	2	24	103:198	22
10.	VŽKG Ostrava	36	8	4	24	108:167	20

== 1. Liga-Qualification ==
Place	Team	Pts
1.	VTŽ Chomutov	12
2.	Slezan Opava	6
3.	Spartak Hradec Králové	4
4.	Dukla Nitra	2
