= 1975 Ice Hockey World Championships =

1975 edition of the IIHF World Ice Hockey Championship

Tournament details
- Host country: West Germany
- Venues: 2 (in 2 host cities)
- Dates: 3–19 April
- Teams: 6

Final positions
- Champions: Soviet Union (14th title)
- Runners-up: Czechoslovakia
- Third place: Sweden
- Fourth place: Finland

Tournament statistics
- Games played: 30
- Goals scored: 272 (9.07 per game)
- Attendance: 169,000 (5,633 per game)
- Scoring leader: (Soviet Union) Viktor Shalimov 19 points

The 1975 Ice Hockey World Championships were the 42nd Ice Hockey World Championships and the 53rd European Championships of ice hockey. The tournament took place in West Germany from 3 to 19 April and the games were played in Munich and Düsseldorf. Six teams took part in the main tournament, each playing each other twice. The Soviet Union won all of their games, and became World Champions for the 14th time, and won their 17th European title.

This year did not offer much in the way of drama, with the expected order of finish happening again, and the host not even playing in the top level tournament. This helped to change the player eligibility rules and change the format. Finland narrowly missed a medal again, finishing fourth for the sixth straight year.

== World Championship Group A (West Germany) ==
Pos	Team	Pld	W	D	L	GF	GA	GD	Pts
1	Soviet Union	10	10	0	0	90	23	+67	20
2	Czechoslovakia	10	8	0	2	55	19	+36	16
3	Sweden	10	5	0	5	51	34	+17	10
4	Finland	10	5	0	5	36	34	+2	10
5	Poland	10	2	0	8	18	78	−60	4
6	United States	10	0	0	10	22	84	−62	0

With Group A expanding to eight teams in 1976 no nation was relegated.

3 April	Czechoslovakia	5-0	Poland

3 April	Soviet Union	10-5	United States

4 April	Poland	0-10	Sweden

4 April	United States	4-7	Finland

5 April	Sweden	2-5	Czechoslovakia

5 April	Finland	4-8	Soviet Union

6 April	Czechoslovakia	8-3	United States

6 April	Soviet Union	13-2	Poland

7 April	United States	0-7	Sweden

7 April	Poland	2-5	Finland

8 April	Czechoslovakia	2-5	Soviet Union

8 April	Finland	0-1	Sweden

9 April	Poland	5-3	United States

10 April	Finland	2-6	Czechoslovakia

10 April	Sweden	1-4	Soviet Union

12 April	Poland	2-8	Czechoslovakia

12 April	United States	1-13	Soviet Union

13 April	Sweden	13-0	Poland

13 April	Finland	9-1	United States

14 April	Czechoslovakia	7-0	Sweden

14 April	Soviet Union	5-2	Finland

15 April	United States	0-8	Czechoslovakia

15 April	Poland	1-15	Soviet Union

16 April	Sweden	12-3	United States

16 April	Finland	4-1	Poland

17 April	Soviet Union	4-1	Czechoslovakia

17 April	Sweden	1-2	Finland

18 April	United States	2-5	Poland

19 April	Czechoslovakia	5-1	Finland

19 April	Soviet Union	13-4	Sweden

== World Championship Group B (Japan) ==
Played in Sapporo 14–23 March.

Pos	Team	Pld	W	D	L	GF	GA	GD	Pts
7	East Germany	7	6	0	1	41	18	+23	12
8	West Germany	7	6	0	1	34	17	+17	12
9	Switzerland	7	4	0	3	31	33	−2	8
10	Yugoslavia	7	3	1	3	30	23	+7	7
11	Romania	7	2	2	3	26	26	0	6
12	Japan	7	2	2	3	21	24	−3	6
13	Italy	7	2	0	5	22	40	−18	4
14	Netherlands	7	0	1	6	11	35	−24	1

With Group A expanding to eight teams in 1976, both East and West Germany were promoted, and no nation was relegated. Canada had been offered a spot in Group A first, but they declined until 1977. Additionally, the top six nations qualified for the Innsbruck Olympics.

14 March	West Germany	9-2	Netherlands

14 March	Yugoslavia	5-0	Switzerland

14 March	East Germany	7-3	Romania

14 March	Japan	7-1	Italy

15 March	Romania	4-4	Yugoslavia

15 March	West Germany	6-3	Japan

16 March	Italy	3-0	Netherlands

16 March	East Germany	5-8	Switzerland

17 March	Yugoslavia	2-4	Italy

17 March	West Germany	0-5	East Germany

17 March	Romania	6-1	Netherlands

17 March	Japan	3-2	Switzerland

18 March	West Germany	2-1	Yugoslavia

18 March	Japan	2-2	Romania

19 March	Netherlands	3-4	Switzerland

19 March	East Germany	9-2	Italy

20 March	Romania	3-4	Switzerland

20 March	West Germany	5-2	Italy

20 March	Yugoslavia	7-3	Netherlands

20 March	East Germany	3-1	Japan

21 March	Yugoslavia	8-4	Japan

21 March	West Germany	4-1	Romania

22 March	Switzerland	10-6	Italy

22 March	East Germany	6-1	Netherlands

23 March	Romania	7-4	Italy

23 March	Japan	1-1	Netherlands

23 March	West Germany	8-3	Switzerland

23 March	East Germany	6-3	Yugoslavia

== World Championship Group C (Bulgaria) ==
Played in Sofia 1–10 March. China was supposed to participate but forfeited.

Pos	Team	Pld	W	D	L	GF	GA	GD	Pts
15	Norway	6	4	2	0	44	8	+36	10
16	Bulgaria	6	4	1	1	40	17	+23	9
17	Austria	6	3	1	2	32	16	+16	7
18	Hungary	6	3	1	2	44	21	+23	7
19	France	6	2	2	2	32	22	+10	6
20	Denmark	6	1	1	4	31	33	−2	3
21	Belgium	6	0	0	6	5	111	−106	0

Norway and Bulgaria were promoted to Group B.

1 March	Norway	2-0	Austria

1 March	France	4-0	Denmark

1 March	Hungary	14-0	Belgium

2 March	France	15-0	Belgium

2 March	Norway	5-5	Denmark

2 March	Bulgaria	4-1	Austria

4 March	Austria	4-4	France

4 March	Norway	5-0	Hungary

4 March	Bulgaria	20-3	Belgium

5 March	Norway	24-0	Belgium

5 March	Austria	4-2	Denmark

5 March	Bulgaria	4-6	Hungary

7 March	Austria	4-2	Hungary

7 March	Norway	6-1	France

7 March	Bulgaria	3-2	Denmark

8 March	Hungary	17-3	Denmark

8 March	Austria	19-2	Belgium

8 March	Bulgaria	7-3	France

10 March	Hungary	5-5	France

10 March	Denmark	19-0	Belgium

10 March	Bulgaria	2-2	Norway

== Ranking and statistics ==
1975 IIHF World Championship winners

Soviet Union
14th title

=== Tournament Awards ===
- Best players selected by the directorate:
  - Best Goaltender: (Czechoslovakia) Jiří Holeček
  - Best Defenceman: (Finland) Pekka Marjamäki
  - Best Forward: (Soviet Union) Alexander Yakushev
- Media All-Star Team:
  - Goaltender: (Soviet Union) Vladislav Tretiak
  - Defence: (Finland) Pekka Marjamäki, (Soviet Union) Valeri Vasiliev
  - Forwards: (Czechoslovakia) Vladimír Martinec, (Soviet Union) Vladimir Petrov, (Soviet Union) Alexander Yakushev

=== Final standings ===
The final standings of the tournament according to IIHF:

1st place, gold medalist(s)	Soviet Union
2nd place, silver medalist(s)	Czechoslovakia
3rd place, bronze medalist(s)	Sweden
4	Finland
5	Poland
6	United States

=== European championships final standings ===
Map of the countries participating at the 1975 World Championship

The final standings of the European championships according to IIHF:

Gold medal	Soviet Union
Silver medal	Czechoslovakia
Bronze medal	Sweden
4	Finland
5	Poland
