= 1967–68 Czechoslovak Extraliga season =

Czechoslovak ice hockey season

The 1967–68 Czechoslovak Extraliga season was the 25th season of the Czechoslovak Extraliga, the top level of ice hockey in Czechoslovakia. 10 teams participated in the league, and Dukla Jihlava won the championship.

== Regular season ==
Pl.	Team	GP	W	T	L	GF–GA	Pts
1.	Dukla Jihlava	36	26	7	3	186:81	59
2.	ZKL Brno	36	26	5	5	169:99	57
3.	Spartak ČKD Prag	36	21	5	10	174:137	47
4.	Slovan CHZJD Bratislava	36	21	4	11	158:99	46
5.	TJ SONP Kladno	36	17	4	15	131:116	38
6.	TJ Gottwaldov	36	13	3	20	114:153	29
7.	CHZ Litvínov	36	10	6	20	121:197	26
8.	Tesla Pardubice	36	9	7	20	118:134	25
9.	VSŽ Košice	36	10	5	21	104:143	25
10.	VTŽ Chomutov	36	3	2	31	91:207	8

== 1. Liga-Qualification ==
Place	Team	Pts
1.	Motor České Budějovice	10
2.	VŽKG Ostrava	8
3.	Spartak Hradec Králové	3
4.	Dukla Trenčín	3
