= 1969–70 Czechoslovak Extraliga season =

Czechoslovak ice hockey season

The 1969–70 Czechoslovak Extraliga season was the 27th season of the Czechoslovak Extraliga, the top level of ice hockey in Czechoslovakia. Ten teams participated in the league, and Dukla Jihlava won the championship.

== Regular season ==
Pl.	Team	GP	W	T	L	GF–GA	Pts
1.	Dukla Jihlava	36	24	4	8	178:80	52
2.	Slovan CHZJD Bratislava	36	21	7	8	133:81	49
3.	ZKL Brno	36	23	3	10	149:105	49
4.	TJ SONP Kladno	36	18	4	14	121:118	40
5.	TJ Škoda Plzeň	36	14	5	17	109:131	33
6.	Spartak ČKD Praha	36	15	2	19	155:148	32
7.	Tesla Pardubice	36	13	5	18	131:146	31
8.	VSŽ Košice	36	10	7	19	93:129	27
9.	CHZ Litvínov	36	11	4	21	115:175	26
10.	TJ Gottwaldov	36	7	7	22	106:177	21

== 1. Liga-Qualification ==
Place	Team	Pts
1.	Motor České Budějovice	12
2.	Baník ČSA Karviná	6
3.	Dukla Pisek	4
4.	LVS Poprad	2
