= 1988–89 Czechoslovak Extraliga season =

Czechoslovak ice hockey season

The 1988–89 Czechoslovak Extraliga season was the 46th season of the Czechoslovak Extraliga, the top level of ice hockey in Czechoslovakia. 12 teams participated in the league, and VSZ Kosice won the championship.

== Regular season ==
Pl.	Team	GP	W	T	L	GF–GA	Pts
1.	Tesla Pardubice	34	23	6	5	158:95	52
2.	Dukla Trenčín	34	19	4	11	148:126	42
3.	Dukla Jihlava	34	17	5	12	118:103	39
4.	TJ Škoda Plzeň	34	16	6	12	130:110	38
5.	VSŽ Košice	34	14	9	11	125:116	37
6.	Sparta ČKD Prag	34	14	6	14	116:123	34
7.	Motor České Budějovice	34	13	7	14	119:111	33
8.	CHZ Litvínov	34	13	6	15	151:148	32
9.	TJ Vítkovice	34	12	6	16	106:134	32
10.	TJ Gottwaldov	34	11	8	15	103:110	30
11.	Poldi SONP Kladno	34	11	7	16	129:163	29
12.	Slovan CHZJD Bratislava	34	3	6	25	95:159	12

== Playoffs ==
=== Quarterfinal ===
- Tesla Pardubice – CHZ Litvínov 4:3 (4:1,0:1,0:1)
- Tesla Pardubice – CHZ Litvínov 9:5 (4:2,3:2,2:1)
- CHZ Litvínov – Tesla Pardubice 6:7 PP (1:3,3:2,2:1,0:1)
- Dukla Trenčín – Motor České Budějovice 4:3 (2:1,2:2,0:0)
- Dukla Trenčín – Motor České Budějovice 2:3 (0:3,2:0,0:0)
- Motor České Budějovice – Dukla Trenčín 5:7 (2:2,1:0,2:5)
- Motor České Budějovice – Dukla Trenčín 2:3 SN (1:0,1:1,0:1,0:0)
- Dukla Jihlava – Sparta Praha 2:3 PP (0:1,1:1,1:0,0:0,0:0,0:1)
- Dukla Jihlava – Sparta Praha 5:1 (2:0,1:1,2:0)
- Sparta Praha – Dukla Jihlava 4:1 (0:0,2:1,2:0)
- Sparta Praha – Dukla Jihlava 5:2 (1:1,1:1,3:0)
- Škoda Plzeň – VSŽ Košice 2:3 PP (0:2,2:0,0:0,0:1)
- Škoda Plzeň – VSŽ Košice 1:6 (1:3,0:3,0:0)
- VSŽ Košice – Škoda Plzeň 3:1 (1:0,1:1,1:0)

=== Semifinal ===
- Tesla Pardubice – Sparta Praha 4:2 (2:1,0:1,2:0)
- Tesla Pardubice – Sparta Praha 6:1 (0:1,2:0,4:0)
- Sparta Praha – Tesla Pardubice 3:7 (1:0,1:5,1:2)
- Dukla Trenčín – VSŽ Košice 8:0 (3:0,3:0,2:0)
- Dukla Trenčín – VSŽ Košice 5:3 (2:1,2:1,1:1)
- VSŽ Košice – Dukla Trenčín 5:7 (3:3,1:2,1:2)

=== Final ===
- Tesla Pardubice – Dukla Trenčín 4:3 PP (2:0,1:1,0:2,1:0)
- Tesla Pardubice – Dukla Trenčín 3:1 (0:1,3:0,0:0)
- Dukla Trenčín – Tesla Pardubice 4:2 (3:1,0:0,1:1)
- Dukla Trenčín – Tesla Pardubice 1:4 (0:1,0:2,1:1)

=== Placing round ===
- Dukla Jihlava – CHZ Litvínov 10:4 (7:1,1:2,2:1)
- Dukla Jihlava – CHZ Litvínov 8:2 (2:1,3:1,3:0)
- CHZ Litvínov – Dukla Jihlava 3:5 (1:1,1:2,1:2)

- Škoda Plzeň – Motor České Budějovice 2:5 (1:3,1:1,0:1)
- Škoda Plzeň – Motor České Budějovice 4:6 (2:3,0:1,2:2)
- Motor České Budějovice – Škoda Plzeň 3:1 (1:0,0:0,2:1)
- 9th place
- TJ Vítkovice – TJ Gottwaldov 3:4 SN (1:1,2:2,0:0,0:0)
- TJ Vítkovice – TJ Gottwaldov 3:6 (1:2,1:4,1:0)
- TJ Gottwaldov – TJ Vítkovice 3:6 (0:5,1:0,2:1)
- TJ Gottwaldov – TJ Vítkovice 6:5 PP (1:0,4:2,0:3,1:0)
- 7th place
- Škoda Plzeň – CHZ Litvínov 3:6 (1:1,2:2,0:3)
- Škoda Plzeň – CHZ Litvínov 6:4 (1:3,2:1,3:0)
- CHZ Litvínov – Škoda Plzeň 1:8 (0:3,1:3,0:2)
- CHZ Litvínov – Škoda Plzeň 2:7 (0:1,2:3,0:3)
- 5th place
- Dukla Jihlava – Motor České Budějovice 3:6 (1:3,1:1,1:2)
- Dukla Jihlava – Motor České Budějovice 6:2 (1:1,2:0,3:1)
- Motor České Budějovice – Dukla Jihlava 6:3 (0:0,3:1,3:2)
- Motor České Budějovice – Dukla Jihlava 0:4 (0:1,0:1,0:2)
- Dukla Jihlava – Motor České Budějovice 10:7 (1:1,4:1,5:5)
- 3rd place
- VSŽ Košice – Sparta Praha 3:6 (0:2,1:2,2:2)
- VSŽ Košice – Sparta Praha 0:6 (0:3,0:2,0:1)
- Sparta Praha – VSŽ Košice 2:3 (1:0,1:1,0:2)
- Sparta Praha – VSŽ Košice 4:6 (1:3,1:1,2:2)
- VSŽ Košice – Sparta Praha 6:2 (3:1,1:0,2:1)

== Relegation round ==
Pl.	Team	GP	Bonus	GF–GA	Pts
9.	TJ Vítkovice	6	3	26:17	11
10.	TJ Gottwaldov	6	2	23:20	9
11.	Slovan CHZJD Bratislava	6	0	13:15	6
12.	Poldi SONP Kladno	6	1	16:26	4

== 1. Liga-Qualification ==
Pl.	Team	GP	Pts
1.	Zetor Brno	10	13
2.	Poldi SONP Kladno	10	13
3.	DS Olomouc	10	12
4.	Plastika Nitra	10	8
5.	Slovan CHZJD Bratislava	10	7
6.	Partizán Liptovský Mikuláš	10	7
