= 1970–71 Czechoslovak Extraliga season =

Czechoslovak ice hockey season

The 1970–71 Czechoslovak Extraliga season was the 28th season of the Czechoslovak Extraliga, the top level of ice hockey in Czechoslovakia. 10 teams participated in the league, and Dukla Jihlava won the championship.

== Regular season ==
Pl.	Team	GP	W	T	L	GF–GA	Pts
1.	ZKL Brno	36	20	7	9	152:104	47
2.	Dukla Jihlava	36	19	8	9	147:87	46
3.	TJ SONP Kladno	36	20	4	12	140:93	44
4.	Slovan CHZJD Bratislava	36	17	5	14	127:103	39
5.	VSŽ Košice	36	13	8	15	110:131	34
6.	Tesla Pardubice	36	14	5	17	127:135	33
7.	Spartak ČKD Prag	36	14	5	17	126:156	33
8.	CHZ Litvínov	36	13	6	17	109:156	32
9.	Motor České Budějovice	36	10	8	18	126:165	28
10.	TJ Škoda Plzeň	36	10	4	22	120:154	24

== Playoffs ==
=== Semifinals ===
  - SONP Kladno – ZKL Brno 4:1 (0:0,1:1,3:0)
  - ZKL Brno – SONP Kladno 5:1 (2:0 2:1 1:0)
  - SONP Kladno – ZKL Brno 5:3 (1:1 3:1 1:1)
  - SONP Kladno – ZKL Brno 1:0 (0:0 0:0 1:0)
  - ZKL Brno – SONP Kladno 4:0 (1:0 0:0 3:0)
  - ZKL Brno – SONP Kladno 5:1 (3:0 1:0 1:1)
  - ZKL Brno – SONP Kladno 2:1 (0:1 1:0 1:0)
  - Slovan CHZJD Bratislava – Dukla Jihlava 4:5 (3:2 1:2 0:1)
  - Dukla Jihlava – Slovan CHZJD Bratislava 5:4 (1:1 3:1 1:2)
  - Slovan CHZJD Bratislava – Dukla Jihlava 3:2 (2:0 0:0 1:2)
  - Slovan CHZJD Bratislava – Dukla Jihlava 0:1 OT (0:0 0:0 0:0 0:1)
  - Dukla Jihlava – Slovan CHZJD Bratislava 5:1 (1:1 2:0 2:0)

=== 3rd place ===
  - SONP Kladno – Slovan CHZJD Bratislava 2:6 (0:0 1:5 1:1)
  - Slovan CHZJD Bratislava – SONP Kladno 4:3 (3:0 1:2 0:1)

=== Final ===
  - Dukla Jihlava – ZKL Brno 5:3 (2:1 1:0 2:2)
  - Dukla Jihlava – ZKL Brno 6:5 OT (1:2 0:0 4:3 1:0)
  - ZKL Brno – Dukla Jihlava 0:1 (0:0 0:0 0:1)

== 1. Liga-Qualification ==
Place	Team	Pts
1.	TJ Gottwaldov	10
2.	Dukla Trenčín	8
3.	VTŽ Chomutov	4
4.	I. ČLTK Prag	2
