= 1971–72 Czechoslovak Extraliga season =

Czechoslovak ice hockey season

The 1971–72 Czechoslovak Extraliga season was the 29th season of the Czechoslovak Extraliga, the top level of ice hockey in Czechoslovakia. 10 teams participated in the league, and Dukla Jihlava won the championship.

== Regular season ==
Pl.	Team	GP	W	T	L	GF–GA	Pts
1.	Dukla Jihlava	36	22	4	10	148:86	48
2.	Slovan CHZJD Bratislava	36	19	8	9	135:88	46
3.	TJ SONP Kladno	36	21	4	11	125:94	46
4.	Tesla Pardubice	36	17	6	13	124:112	40
5.	ZKL Brno	36	18	4	14	106:100	40
6.	Motor České Budějovice	36	13	4	19	105:138	30
7.	Spartak ČKD Prag	36	12	6	18	89:128	30
8.	VSŽ Košice	36	12	5	19	81:113	29
9.	CHZ Litvínov	36	12	3	21	121:142	27
10.	TJ Gottwaldov	36	8	8	20	91:124	24

== 1. Liga-Qualification ==
Place	Team	Pts
1.	TJ Škoda Plzeň	8
2.	Slavia Prag	7
3.	VŽKG Ostrava/Vítkovice	7
4.	ŠK Liptovský Mikuláš	2
