= 1973–74 Czechoslovak Extraliga season =

31. regular staging of the top czechoslovak ice hockey league

The 1973–74 Czechoslovak Extraliga season was the 31st season of the Czechoslovak Extraliga, the top level of ice hockey in Czechoslovakia. 12 teams participated in the league, and Dukla Jihlava won the championship.

== Regular season ==
Pl.	Team	GP	W	T	L	GF–GA	Pts
1.	Dukla Jihlava	44	30	9	5	199:89	69
2.	Spartak ČKD Prag	44	28	2	14	163:108	58
3.	Tesla Pardubice	44	23	9	12	151:125	55
4.	ZKL Brno	44	18	10	16	148:139	46
5.	TJ SONP Kladno	44	19	7	18	159:145	45
6.	VSŽ Košice	44	19	7	18	148:139	45
7.	Slovan CHZJD Bratislava	44	19	6	19	162:177	44
8.	CHZ Litvínov	44	18	4	22	140:157	40
9.	VŽKG Ostrava/Vítkovice	44	14	10	20	149:156	38
10.	Motor České Budějovice	44	13	9	22	123:169	35
11.	TJ Škoda Plzeň	44	14	6	24	147:169	34
12.	VTŽ Chomutov	44	6	7	31	124:210	19

== 1. Liga-Qualification ==
- TJ Gottwaldov – ŠK Liptovský Mikuláš 3–1 (9–2, 8–2, 4–5PP, 8–2)
- TJ Gottwaldov won the series 3–1 and qualified to 1974–75 Czechoslovak Extraliga.
