= 1979–80 Czechoslovak Extraliga season =

Czechoslovak ice hockey season

The 1979–80 Czechoslovak Extraliga season was the 37th season of the Czechoslovak Extraliga, the top level of ice hockey in Czechoslovakia. 12 teams participated in the league, and Poldi SONP Kladno won the championship.

== Standings ==
Pl.	Team	Pl.	W	T	L	GF–GA	Pts
1.	Poldi SONP Kladno	44	31	9	4	191:99	71
2.	Dukla Jihlava	44	31	5	8	185:113	67
3.	Slovan CHZJD Bratislava	44	25	5	14	195:162	55
4.	TJ Vítkovice	44	21	5	18	171:170	47
5.	Spartak ČKD Prag	44	17	8	19	131:145	42
6.	Dukla Trenčín	44	19	4	21	142:157	42
7.	VSŽ Košice	44	16	5	23	174:183	37
8.	Motor České Budějovice	44	14	8	22	155:175	36
9.	TJ Škoda Plzeň	44	16	4	24	124:164	36
10.	Tesla Pardubice	44	15	5	24	163:175	35
11.	CHZ Litvínov	44	12	8	24	137:178	32
12.	Zetor Brno	44	11	6	27	133:180	28

== 1. Liga-Qualification ==
- TJ Gottwaldov – Spartak Dubnica nad Váhom 3:1 (2:3, 3:1, 4:2, 7:3)
