= 1974–75 Czechoslovak Extraliga season =

Czechoslovak ice hockey season

The 1974–75 Czechoslovak Extraliga season was the 32nd season of the Czechoslovak Extraliga, the top level of ice hockey in Czechoslovakia. 12 teams participated in the league, and TJ SONP Kladno won the championship.

== Standings ==
Pl.	Team	GP	W	T	L	GF–GA	Pts
1.	TJ SONP Kladno	44	27	8	9	176:106	62
2.	Tesla Pardubice	44	25	4	15	151:112	54
3.	Dukla Jihlava	44	21	9	14	146:115	51
4.	CHZ Litvínov	44	22	5	17	159:157	49
5.	Slovan CHZJD Bratislava	44	22	2	20	145:155	46
6.	Spartak ČKD Prag	44	19	7	18	146:115	45
7.	Motor České Budějovice	44	19	7	18	155:138	45
8.	ZKL Brno	44	18	5	21	130:141	41
9.	TJ Škoda Plzeň	44	18	4	22	154:169	40
10.	VSŽ Košice	44	16	5	23	128:152	37
11.	VŽKG Ostrava/Vítkovice	44	15	4	25	126:162	34
12.	TJ Gottwaldov	44	9	6	29	95:189	24

== 1. Liga-Qualification ==
- Ingstav Brno – LB Zvolen 4:1 (4:2, 6:1, 1:2, 6:1, 5:0)
