= 1976–77 Czechoslovak Extraliga season =

Czechoslovak ice hockey season

The 1976–77 Czechoslovak Extraliga season was the 34th season of the Czechoslovak Extraliga, the top level of ice hockey in Czechoslovakia. 12 teams participated in the league, and TJ SONP Kladno won the championship.

== Regular season ==
Pl.	Team	GP	W	T	L	GF–GA	Pts
1.	TJ SONP Kladno	44	33	4	7	214:111	70
2.	Dukla Jihlava	44	32	5	7	183:90	69
3.	Spartak ČKD Prag	44	23	6	15	156:131	52
4.	Tesla Pardubice	44	20	10	14	175:145	50
5.	Motor České Budějovice	44	18	8	18	154:156	44
6.	Slovan CHZJD Bratislava	44	19	6	19	118:125	44
7.	TJ Vítkovice	44	17	7	20	159:160	41
8.	TJ Škoda Plzeň	44	17	6	21	178:191	40
9.	CHZ Litvínov	44	16	8	20	144:190	40
10.	VSŽ Košice	44	15	7	22	176:176	37
11.	ZKL Brno	44	11	7	26	119:168	29
12.	TJ Gottwaldov	44	3	6	35	119:252	12

== 1. Liga-Qualification ==
- Slezan Opava – Dukla Trenčín 2:4 (7:2, 3:0, 0:5, 2:3, 2:5, 3:4)
