= 1975–76 Czechoslovak Extraliga season =

Czechoslovak ice hockey season

The 1975–76 Czechoslovak Extraliga season was the 33rd season of the Czechoslovak Extraliga, the top level of ice hockey in Czechoslovakia. 12 teams participated in the league, and TJ SONP Kladno won the championship.

== First round ==
Pl.	Team	GP	W	T	L	GF–GA	Pts
1.	TJ SONP Kladno	22	14	2	6	97:57	30
2.	Tesla Pardubice	22	12	5	5	84:64	29
3.	Dukla Jihlava	22	10	5	7	72:53	25
4.	ZKL Brno	22	11	2	9	61:67	24
5.	Spartak ČKD Prag	22	10	3	9	71:54	23
6.	TJ Škoda Plzeň	22	10	3	9	80:77	23
7.	VSŽ Košice	22	10	3	9	61:60	23
8.	Slovan CHZJD Bratislava	22	9	3	10	72:78	21
9.	VŽKG Ostrava/Vítkovice	22	7	6	9	71:76	20
10.	Motor České Budějovice	22	8	3	11	70:86	19
11.	CHZ Litvínov	22	8	0	14	65:93	16
12.	TJ Ingstav Brno	22	5	1	16	57:96	11

== Final round ==
Pl.	Team	GP	W	T	L	GF–GA	Pts
1.	TJ SONP Kladno	32	21	4	7	146:82	46
2.	Tesla Pardubice	32	19	6	7	127:92	44
3.	Dukla Jihlava	32	14	8	10	103:82	36
4.	ZKL Brno	32	15	3	14	94:100	33
5.	TJ Škoda Plzeň	32	13	3	16	116:132	29
6.	Spartak ČKD Prag	32	11	4	17	94:99	26

== 7th-12th place ==
Pl.	Team	GP	W	T	L	GF–GA	Pts
7.	VŽKG Ostrava/Vítkovice	32	13	7	12	123:114	33
8.	Motor České Budějovice	32	14	4	14	96:110	32
9.	VSŽ Košice	32	12	7	13	91:100	31
10.	Slovan CHZJD Bratislava	32	13	3	16	111:116	29
11.	CHZ Litvínov	32	12	2	18	95:122	26
12.	TJ Ingstav Brno	32	8	3	21	87:134	19

== 1. Liga-Qualification ==
- TJ Gottwaldov – LB Zvolen 4:3 (6:0, 4:2, 1:4, 1:3, 5:3, 1:4, 4:2)
