= HC Dukla Jihlava =

Czech ice hockey team

- City: Jihlava, Czech Republic
- League: Czech 1. liga
- Founded: 1956
- Home arena: Horácká aréna
- Colours: Crimson, gold
- General manager: Bedřich Ščerban
- Head coach: Viktor Ujčík
- Website: www.hcdukla.cz

HC Dukla Jihlava, founded in 1956, is an ice hockey team in the Czech Republic. It won the Czechoslovak Extraliga title 12 times: six consecutive championships beginning in 1967, then in 1974, four consecutive championships beginning in 1982, and again in 1991. As of 2019, HC Dukla Jihlava plays in the Czech 1. liga after being relegated from the Czech Extraliga in 2017–18.

Some of its prominent players have included Jaroslav Holík, Jiří Holík, Jan Klapáč, Jan Suchý, Ladislav Šmíd senior, Miloš Podhorský, Jan Hrbatý, Josef Augusta, Milan Chalupa, Jaroslav Benák, Petr Vlk, Libor Dolana, Igor Liba, Oldřich Válek, Dominik Hašek, Jiří Crha and Bedřich Ščerban.

== Honours ==
=== Domestic ===
Czech 1. Liga

- (gold) Winners (6): 1999–2000, 2003–04, 2015–16, 2021–22, 2024–25, 2025–26
- (silver) Runners-up (3): 2001–02, 2002–03, 2016–17
- (bronze) 3rd place (4): 2000–01, 2010–11, 2013–14, 2018–19

Czechoslovak Extraliga

- (gold) Winners (12): 1966–67, 1967–68, 1968–69, 1969–70, 1970–71, 1971–72, 1973–74, 1981–82, 1982–83, 1983–84, 1984–85, 1990–91
- (silver) Runners-up (7): 1965–66, 1972–73, 1976–77, 1978–79, 1979–80, 1985–86, 1986–87
- (bronze) 3rd place (5): 1961–62, 1963–64, 1974–75, 1975–76, 1987–88

=== International ===
IIHF European Cup

- (silver) Runners-up (5): 1967–68, 1970–71, 1974–75, 1982–83, 1983–84
- (bronze) 3rd place (1): 1984–85

Spengler Cup

- (gold) Winners (5): 1965, 1966, 1968, 1978, 1982
- (silver) Runners-up (5): 1970, 1971, 1977, 1983, 1984
