= Göran Högosta =

Swedish ice hockey player

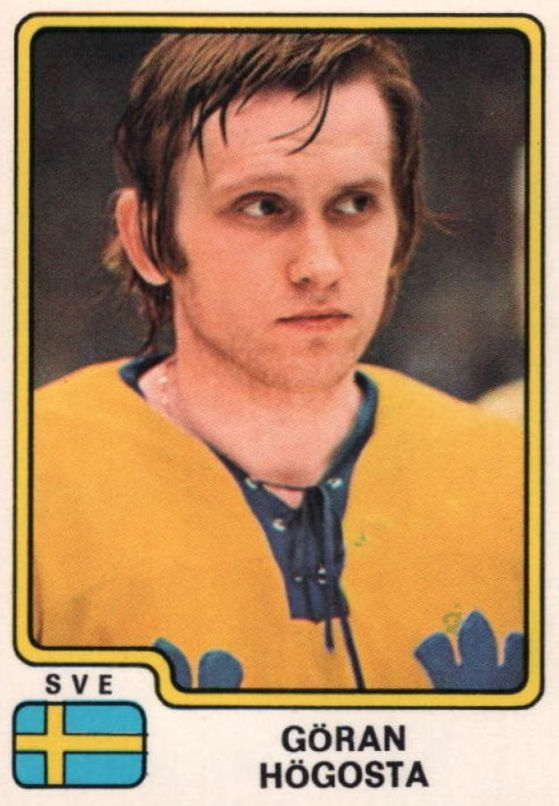
- Born: April 15, 1954 (age 72) Äppelbo, Sweden
- Height: 6 ft 1 in (185 cm)
- Weight: 179 lb (81 kg; 12 st 11 lb)
- Position: Goaltender
- Caught: Left
- Played for: Leksands IF; New York Islanders; Quebec Nordiques; Västra Frölunda HC
- National team: Sweden
- NHL draft: Undrafted
- Playing career: 1969–1980

Alf Göran Högosta (born April 15, 1954) is a Swedish former professional ice hockey goaltender. Högosta played one game for the New York Islanders in 1977–78 and in 21 games with the Quebec Nordiques in 1979–80. In Sweden he played for Leksands IF and Västra Frölunda HC. Internationally he played for Sweden at four World Championships and the 1976 Canada Cup. Högosta's last game prior to retirement was played on 4 April 1980 where he played for the Quebec Nordiques against the Hartford Whalers

== Career statistics ==
=== Regular season and playoffs ===
			Regular season									Playoffs
Season	Team	League	GP	W	L	T	MIN	GA	SO	GAA	SV%	GP	W	L	MIN	GA	SO	GAA	SV%
1968–69	IF Tunabro J20	SWE Jr	—	—	—	—	—	—	—	—	—	—	—	—	—	—	—	—	—
1969–70	IF Tunabro	SWE-2	—	—	—	—	—	—	—	—	—	—	—	—	—	—	—	—	—
1970–71	IF Tunabro	SWE-2	—	—	—	—	—	—	—	—	—	—	—	—	—	—	—	—	—
1971–72	IF Tunabro	SWE	11	—	—	—	660	64	0	5.82	—	—	—	—	—	—	—	—	—
1972–73	IF Tunabro	SWE	10	—	—	—	600	59	0	5.90	.862	6	—	—	360	21	0	3.50	—
1973–74	IF Tunabro	SWE	10	—	—	—	600	62	0	6.20	.835	—	—	—	—	—	—	—	—
1974–75	Leksands IF	SWE	30	—	—	—	1800	80	0	2.67	.880	5	—	—	304	15	0	2.96	—
1975–76	Leksands IF	SWE	27	—	—	—	1620	118	0	4.37	.858	4	—	—	—	—	—	3.61	.856
1976–77	Leksands IF	SWE	33	—	—	—	1921	126	0	3.94	.874	4	—	—	245	16	0	3.92	.885
1977–78	New York Islanders	NHL	1	0	0	0	9	0	0	0.00	1.000	—	—	—	—	—	—	—	—
1977–78	Fort Worth Texans	CHL	5	3	2	0	297	19	0	3.84	.873	—	—	—	—	—	—	—	—
1977–78	Hershey Bears	AHL	23	6	13	2	1254	82	1	3.92	—	—	—	—	—	—	—	—	—
1978–79	Fort Worth Texans	CHL	61	25	29	4	3332	195	2	3.51	.877	3	1	2	167	9	0	3.23	—
1979–80	Quebec Nordiques	NHL	21	5	12	3	1193	83	1	4.18	.869	—	—	—	—	—	—	—	—
1979–80	Syracuse Firebirds	AHL	17	4	9	4	1037	69	0	3.99	.884	—	—	—	—	—	—	—	—
1980–81	Västra Frölunda IF	SWE	18	—	—	—	1078	76	0	4.23	.866	1	0	1	60	6	0	6.00	.854
1981–82	Västra Frölunda IF	SWE	28	—	—	—	1582	89	0	3.38	.898	—	—	—	—	—	—	—	—
1982–83	Västra Frölunda IF	SWE	34	—	—	—	1980	140	1	4.24	.879	—	—	—	—	—	—	—	—
1983–84	Västra Frölunda IF	SWE	36	—	—	—	1093	151	1	8.29	—	—	—	—	—	—	—	—	—
1986–87	Leksands IF	SWE	4	2	1	0	200	16	0	4.80	.842	—	—	—	—	—	—	—	—
NHL totals			22	5	12	3	1202	83	1	4.15	.870	—	—	—	—	—	—	—	—

=== International ===
Year	Team	Event	GP	W	L	T	MIN	GA	SO	GAA	SV%
1972	Sweden	EJC	2	—	—	—	70	2	0	1.71	—
1973	Sweden	EJC	4	—	—	—	210	11	0	3.14	—
1974	Sweden	WJC	4	—	—	—	—	—	—	4.25	—
1975	Sweden	WC	4	2	2	0	220	12	2	3.27	.865
1976	Sweden	WC	6	4	2	0	360	20	0	3.33	.891
1976	Sweden	CC	1	1	0	0	60	1	0	1.00	.965
1977	Sweden	WC	7	6	1	0	412	9	0	1.31	—
1978	Sweden	WC	7	2	4	0	392	22	0	3.37	—
Senior totals			25	15	9	0	1444	64	2	2.66	—
