= Lars Zetterström =

Swedish ice hockey player

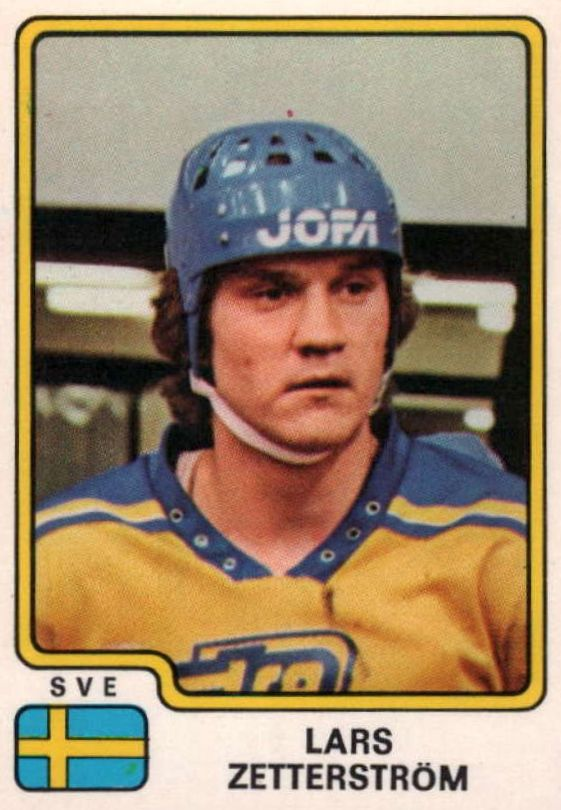
- Born: November 6, 1953 (age 72) Stockholm, Sweden
- Height: 6 ft 0 in (183 cm)
- Weight: 194 lb (88 kg; 13 st 12 lb)
- Position: Defence
- Shot: Left
- Played for: Färjestads BK; Vancouver Canucks
- National team: Sweden
- NHL draft: Undrafted
- Playing career: 1971–1987

Erik Lars-Olov Zetterström (born November 6, 1953) is a Swedish former professional ice hockey player who spent many years with Färjestads BK of the Elitserien, and also played briefly in the National Hockey League with the Vancouver Canucks.

== Playing career ==
A smooth, mobile defender, Zetterström came up through the junior ranks at Färjestads and became a regular in 1972. He would become one of the club's top defenders, and represented Sweden at the 1977 and 1978 World Championships, winning a silver medal in 1977.

In 1978, Zetterström signed as a free agent with the NHL's Vancouver Canucks. Joining the team along with fellow Swedes Thomas Gradin and Lars Lindgren, the trio were the first Europeans to suit up for the club in their history. While Gradin and Lindgren were successful and went on to solid NHL careers, Zetterström struggled. He played in only 14 games for the Canucks, recording one assist and a -10 rating, and spent most of the season in the Central Hockey League with the Dallas Black Hawks.

Zetterström was claimed by the Quebec Nordiques in the 1979 NHL Expansion Draft, but returned to Sweden to once again suit up for Färjestads. He would play for them until 1983, helping them to the Swedish Championship in 1981. He then joined the third-division Hammarö HC club, and played for them until retiring in 1987.

== Career statistics ==
=== Regular season and playoffs ===
			Regular season					Playoffs
Season	Team	League	GP	G	A	Pts	PIM	GP	G	A	Pts	PIM
1971–72	Färjestad BK	Swe	14	3	2	5	0	—	—	—	—	—
1972–73	Färjestad BK	Swe	27	3	8	11	2	—	—	—	—	—
1973–74	Färjestad BK	Swe	31	5	2	7	14	—	—	—	—	—
1974–75	Färjestad BK	Swe	28	10	9	19	24	—	—	—	—	—
1975–76	Färjestad BK	SEL	35	9	6	15	25	4	1	0	1	2
1976–77	Färjestad BK	SEL	33	5	3	8	14	5	1	1	2	4
1977–78	Färjestad BK	SEL	36	6	6	12	42	—	—	—	—	—
1978–79	Vancouver Canucks	NHL	14	0	1	1	2	—	—	—	—	—
1978–79	Dallas Black Hawks	CHL	56	1	33	34	33	9	2	4	6	6
1979–80	Cincinnati Stingers	CHL	27	3	14	17	14	—	—	—	—	—
1980–81	Färjestad BK	SEL	35	4	6	10	40	7	0	2	2	6
1981–82	Färjestad BK	SEL	31	5	4	9	45	2	0	0	0	2
1982–83	Färjestad BK	SEL	32	2	3	5	28	8	1	0	1	6
1983–84	Hammarö HC	Swe-3	21	5	11	16	—	—	—	—	—	—
1984–85	Hammarö HC	Swe-3	26	9	12	21	—	—	—	—	—	—
1985–86	Hammarö HC	Swe-3	35	6	13	9	—	—	—	—	—	—
1986–87	Hammarö HC	Swe-2	24	5	4	9	8	—	—	—	—	—
NHL totals			14	0	1	1	2	—	—	—	—	—
SEL totals			302	52	48	105	234	26	3	3	6	20
