= Kent-Erik Andersson =

Swedish ice hockey player

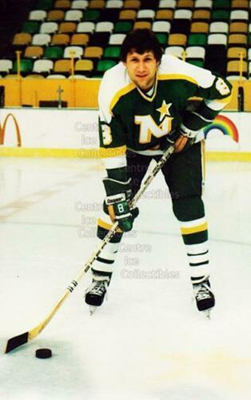
- Born: 24 May 1951 (age 75) Örebro, Sweden
- Height: 6 ft 2 in (188 cm)
- Weight: 185 lb (84 kg; 13 st 3 lb)
- Position: Right wing
- Shot: Right
- Played for: Minnesota North Stars; New York Rangers
- NHL draft: Undrafted
- Playing career: 1970–1986
Medal record
Ice hockey
Representing Sweden
World Championships
Silver medal – second place	1977 Austria

Kent-Erik Andersson (born 24 May 1951) is a Swedish former professional ice hockey right winger who played seven seasons in the National Hockey League (NHL) for the Minnesota North Stars and New York Rangers.

== Playing career ==
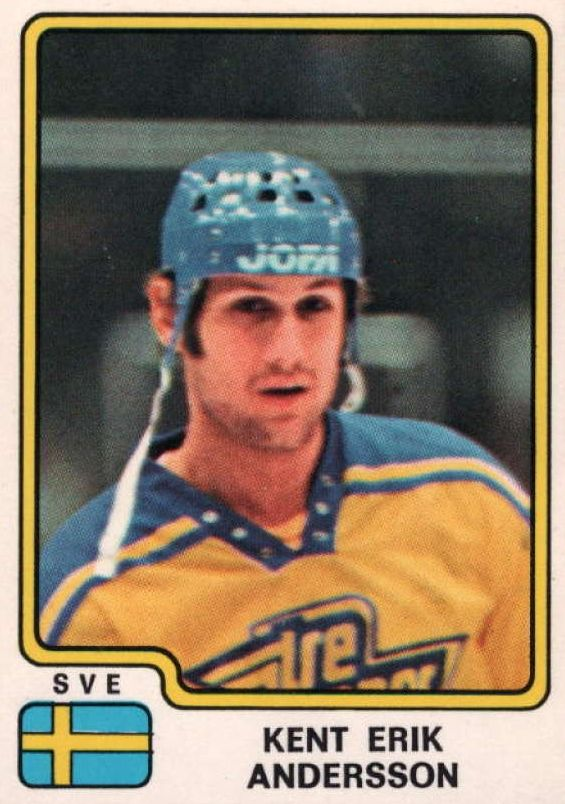
Andersson in 1979 for Sweden

Andersson played seven seasons in the NHL, five with the Minnesota North Stars and two with the New York Rangers. In his native Sweden he played for Färjestads BK, and in his last game with them won the Swedish Championship in 1986. After that season, he was forced to retire due to an eye injury. He also played for the Swedish National team and in 1977 he got a silver medal at the World Championship.

== Awards and achievements ==
1977 silver medalist - World Championships

== Career statistics ==
=== Regular season and playoffs ===
			Regular season					Playoffs
Season	Team	League	GP	G	A	Pts	PIM	GP	G	A	Pts	PIM
1970–71	Örebro SK	SWE II	—	6	—	—	—	—	—	—	—	—
1971–72	Färjestad BK	SWE	22	9	6	15	2	—	—	—	—	—
1972–73	Färjestad BK	SWE	14	10	7	17	6	—	—	—	—	—
1973–74	Färjestad BK	SWE	12	10	6	16	12	20	15	6	21	4
1974–75	Färjestad BK	SWE	27	18	11	29	2	—	—	—	—	—
1975–76	Färjestad BK	SEL	26	8	5	13	6	4	1	1	2	2
1976–77	Färjestad BK	SEL	33	17	17	34	30	5	2	1	3	4
1977–78	Minnesota North Stars	NHL	73	15	18	33	4	—	—	—	—	—
1978–79	Minnesota North Stars	NHL	41	9	4	13	4	—	—	—	—	—
1979–80	Minnesota North Stars	NHL	61	9	10	19	8	13	2	4	6	2
1979–80	Oklahoma City Stars	CHL	10	5	1	6	12	—	—	—	—	—
1980–81	Minnesota North Stars	NHL	77	17	24	41	22	19	2	4	6	2
1981–82	Minnesota North Stars	NHL	70	9	12	21	18	4	0	2	2	0
1982–83	New York Rangers	NHL	71	8	20	28	14	9	0	0	0	0
1983–84	New York Rangers	NHL	63	5	15	20	8	5	0	1	1	0
1984–85	Färjestad BK	SEL	32	8	12	20	10	3	2	0	2	2
1985–86	Färjestad BK	SEL	25	6	7	13	12	8	5	6	11	2
SWE totals			75	47	30	77	22	20	15	6	21	4
SEL totals			116	39	41	80	58	20	10	8	18	10
NHL totals			456	72	103	175	78	50	4	11	15	4

=== International ===
Year	Team	Event	GP	G	A	Pts	PIM
1977	Sweden	WC	10	4	0	4	0
1978	Sweden	WC	10	5	1	6	12
1981	Sweden	CC	5	0	1	1	0
Senior totals			25	9	2	11	12

== International play ==
Team Sweden - 1981 Canada Cup

Preceded by Mats Waltin	Guldpucken; 1977	Succeeded by Rolf Edberg
