= List of undrafted NHL players with 100 games played =

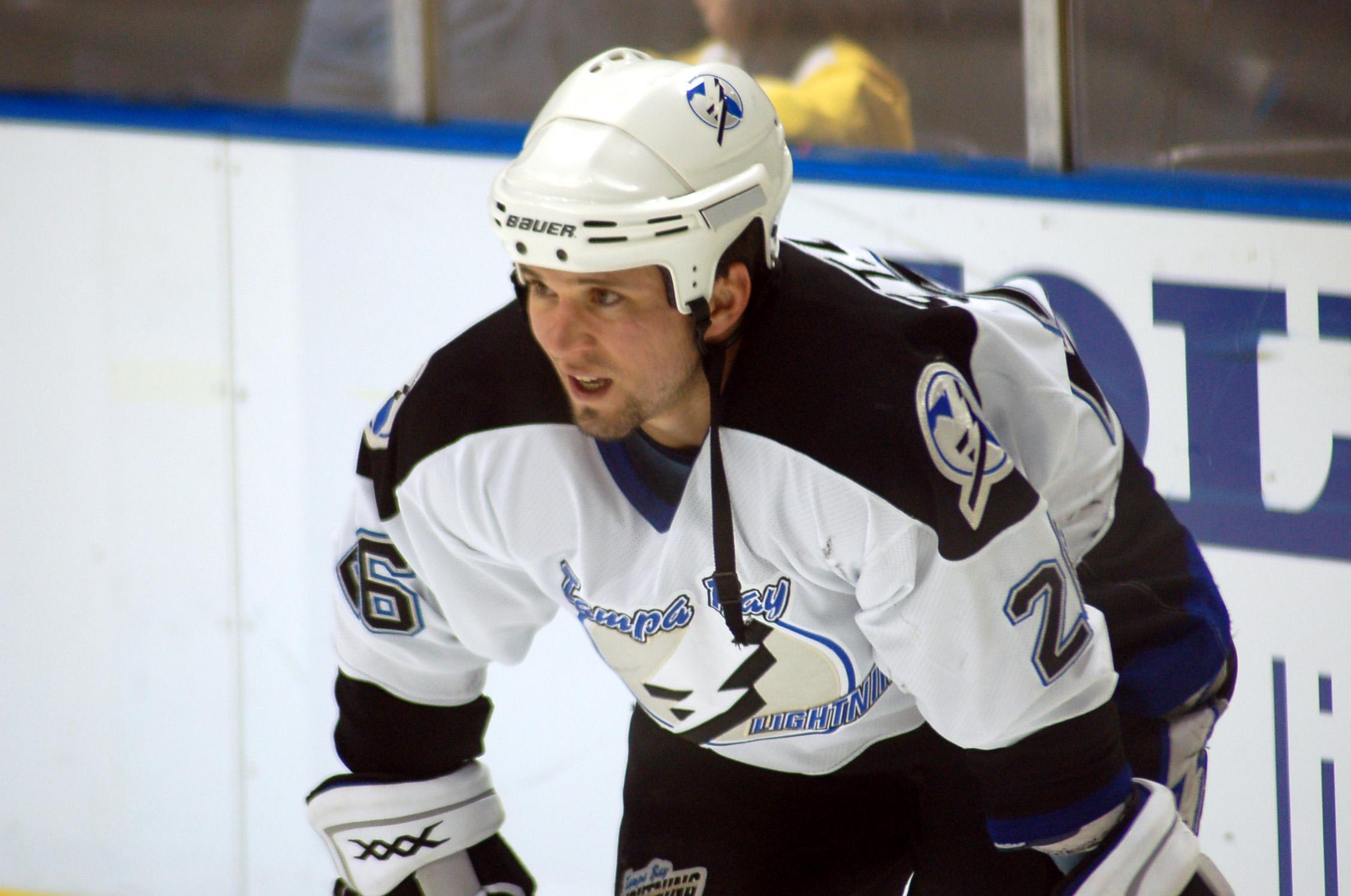
Martin St. Louis is among the most accomplished NHL players who were not drafted.

This is a list of National Hockey League (NHL) players who went undrafted in the NHL entry draft (i.e. they were draft eligible but were not selected during the course of the draft and later signed with NHL teams as an undrafted free agent) and played in at least 100 NHL regular season games. Players whose professional careers began before the 1969–70 season who were not drafted are not considered to be undrafted for purposes of this article, owing to NHL sponsorship of major junior hockey existing prior to that season.

Also not included in this list is Wayne Gretzky, who was one of the Edmonton Oilers priority selections when they entered the NHL in 1979 and thus was never eligible to be drafted by an NHL team. Under existing rules he would have been removed from the Oilers and placed into the NHL Entry Draft since no team held his NHL rights, but the Oilers were allowed to keep Gretzky as one of their priority selections and were forced to choose last in each round of the 1979 NHL entry draft as further compensation.

== Key ==
† Inducted into the Hockey Hall of Fame
‡ Appeared in an NHL game during the most recently completed season

General terms and abbreviations
Term or abbreviation	Definition
GP	Games played
Ref	Reference

Goaltender statistical abbreviations
Abbreviation	Definition
W	Wins
L	Losses
T (Note: Beginning in the 2005–06 season, ties are no longer possible. At the same time, the league began tracking overtime losses for goaltenders.)	Ties
OT	Overtime loss
SO	Shutouts
GAA	Goals against average

Skater statistical abbreviations
Abbreviation	Definition
Pos	Position
G	Goals
A	Assists
P	Points
PIM	Penalty minutes
D	Defence
LW	Left Wing
C	Centre
RW	Right Wing

Statistics are complete to the end of the 2024–25 NHL season and show each player's career regular season totals in the NHL.

== Goaltenders ==
Draft eligible goaltenders since 1969 who were not drafted and played in at least 100 NHL regular season games
Player	Seasons (Note: The seasons column lists the first year of the season of the player's first game and the last year of the season of the player's last game. For example, a player who played his first game during the 1994–95 season in January 1995 and his last game during the 2005–06 season in October 2005 would be listed as playing in the league from 1994–2006.)	GP	W	L	T	OT	SO	GAA	Awards and honours	Ref
Niklas Backstrom	2006–2016	413	196	144	—	50	28	2.49	All-Star Game: 2009; William M. Jennings Trophy: 2006–07	
Ed Belfour†	1988–2007	963	484	320	111	14	76	2.50	All-Rookie Team: 1990–91; All-Star Game: 1992, 1993, 1996, 1998, 1999; Calder Memorial Trophy: 1990–91; First All-Star team: 1990–91, 1992–93; Second All-Star team: 1994–95; Vezina Trophy: 1990–91, 1992–93; William M. Jennings Trophy: 1990–91, 1992–93, 1994–95, 1998–99	
Sergei Bobrovsky‡	2010–present	754	429	244	—	57	49	2.58	All-Star Game: 2015, 2017, 2024; First All-Star team: 2012–13, 2016–17; Vezina Trophy: 2012–13, 2016–17	
Fred Brathwaite	1993–2004	254	81	99	37	—	15	2.73		
Gary Bromley	1973–1981	136	54	44	28	—	7	3.43		
Jon Casey	1983–1997	425	170	157	55	—	16	3.21	All-Star Game: 1993	
Alain Chevrier	1985–1991	234	91	100	14	—	2	4.16		
Mike Condon	2015–2019	129	45	58	—	17	6	2.79		
Ty Conklin	2001–2012	215	96	67	4	17	17	2.69		
Aaron Dell	2016–present	130	50	50	—	13	5	2.92		
Casey DeSmith‡	2017–present	190	84	61	—	23	12	2.79		
Michel Dion	1979–1985	227	60	118	32	—	2	4.24	All-Star Game: 1982	
Alexandar Georgiev	2018–present	303	151	108	—	26	15	2.99	All-Star Game: 2024	
Ron Grahame	1977–1981	114	50	43	15	—	5	3.79		
Jonas Gustavsson	2009–2017	179	72	67	—	23	7	2.88		
Brian Hayward	1982–1993	357	143	156	37	—	8	3.72	William M. Jennings Trophy: 1986–87, 1987–88, 1988–89	
Glenn Healy	1985–2001	437	166	190	47	—	13	3.37		
Jonas Hiller	2007–2016	404	197	140	—	37	23	2.55	All-Star Game: 2011	
Carter Hutton	2012–2022	235	94	90	—	27	13	2.76		
Gary Inness	1973–1981	162	58	61	27	—	2	3.40		
Bob Janecyk	1983–1989	110	43	47	13	—	2	4.15		
Martin Jones	2013–present	466	236	171	—	36	30	2.72	All-Star Game: 2017	
Curtis Joseph	1989–2009	943	454	352	90	6	51	2.79	All-Star Game: 1994, 2000; King Clancy Memorial Trophy: 1999–2000	
Keith Kinkaid	2012–2023	169	70	58	—	21	8	2.91		
Eddie Lack	2013–2018	144	56	55	—	18	9	2.62		
Mark Laforest	1985–1994	103	25	54	4	—	2	4.22		
Kevin Lankinen‡	2021–present	163	70	58	—	22	7	2.93		
Charlie Lindgren‡	2016–present	149	73	53	—	15	9	2.78		
Alex Lyon‡	2018–present	113	51	38	—	11	4	2.99		
Joey MacDonald	2006–2014	133	44	61	—	15	2	3.00		
Bob Mason	1983–1991	145	55	65	16	—	1	3.76		
Antti Niemi	2008–2019	464	242	140	—	57	36	2.57		
Antti Raanta	2013–present	277	139	80	—	29	20	2.48	William M. Jennings Trophy: 2021–22	
Pokey Reddick	1986–1994	132	46	58	16	—	0	3.71		
Glenn Resch	1973–1987	571	231	224	82	—	26	3.27	All-Star Game: 1976, 1977, 1984; Bill Masterton Memorial Trophy: 1981–82; Second All-Star team: 1975–76, 1978–79	
Vincent Riendeau	1987–1995	184	85	65	20	—	5	3.30		
David Rittich‡	2016–present	230	108	71	—	26	7	2.79	All-Star Game: 2020	
Dwayne Roloson	1996–2012	606	227	257	42	40	29	2.72	All-Star Game: 2004	
Roberto Romano	1982–1994	126	46	63	8	—	4	3.97		
Curtis Sanford	2002–2012	144	47	55	0	15	6	2.72		
Ben Scrivens	2011–2016	144	47	64	—	17	7	2.92		
Peter Skudra	1997–2003	146	51	47	20	—	6	2.73		
Cam Talbot‡	2013–present	533	266	195	—	47	33	2.66	All-Star Game: 2022, 2024	
Logan Thompson‡	2021–present	146	87	38	—	17	6	2.62	All-Star Game: 2023	
Bernie Wolfe	1975–1979	120	20	61	21	—	1	4.17		

== Skaters ==
Draft eligible defencemen and forwards since 1969 who were not drafted and played in at least 100 NHL regular season games
Player	Pos	Seasons	GP	G	A	Pts	PIM	Awards and honours	Ref
Noel Acciari‡	C	2015–present	518	68	51	119	168		
Greg C. Adams	LW	1980–1990	545	84	143	227	1173		
Greg D. Adams	LW	1984–2001	1056	355	388	743	326	All-Star Game: 1988	
Fred Ahern	RW	1974–1978	146	31	30	61	130		
Peter Ahola	D	1991–1994	123	10	17	27	137		
Kent-Erik Andersson	RW	1977–1984	456	72	103	175	78		
Mark Arcobello	RW	2012–2016	139	24	29	53	28		
Zach Aston-Reese‡	C	2017–present	389	48	49	97	153		
Pierre Aubry	LW	1980–1985	202	24	26	50	133		
Keith Aucoin	C	2005–2014	145	17	32	49	22		
Sean Avery	C	2001–2012	580	90	157	247	1533		
Uvis Balinskis‡	D	2023–present	102	5	16	21	35		
Alexander Barabanov	RW	2021–2024	206	32	75	107	52		
Dave Barr	RW	1981–1994	614	128	204	332	520		
Lubos Bartecko	LW	1998–2003	257	46	65	111	107		
Victor Bartley	D	2012–2016	121	1	22	23	61		
Bob Bassen	C	1985–2000	765	88	144	232	1004		
Frank Bathe	D	1974–1984	224	3	28	31	542		
Gavin Bayreuther	D	2018–2023	122	5	23	28	62		
Jay Beagle	C	2009–2022	646	58	86	144	250		
John Bednarski	D	1974–1980	100	2	18	20	114		
Ed Beers	LW	1981–1986	250	94	116	210	256		
Jesse Belanger	C	1991–2001	246	59	76	135	56		
Neil Belland	D	1981–1987	109	13	32	45	54		
Pierre-Édouard Bellemare	LW	2014–present	700	64	74	138	182		
Jordie Benn	D	2011–2023	607	26	111	137	244		
Harvey Bennett, Jr.	C	1974–1979	268	44	46	90	347		
Andre Benoit	D	2010–2016	181	11	37	48	60		
Simon Benoît‡	D	2021–present	279	6	24	30	199		
Marc-Andre Bergeron	D	2002–2013	490	82	153	235	214		
Thommie Bergman	D	1972–1980	246	21	44	65	243		
Craig Berube	LW	1986–2003	1054	61	98	159	3149		
Jason Blake	LW	1998–2012	871	213	273	486	455	All-Star Game: 2007; Bill Masterton Memorial Trophy: 2007–08	
Nick Blankenburg‡	D	2022–present	115	10	24	34	48		
John Blum	D	1982–1990	250	7	34	41	610		
Dan Bolduc	LW	1978–1984	102	22	19	41	33		
Brandon Bollig	LW	2011–2016	241	10	13	23	392		
Dan Bonar	C	1980–1983	170	25	39	64	208		
Tim Bothwell	D	1978–1989	502	28	93	121	382		
Francis Bouillon	D	1999–2014	776	32	117	149	536		
Charlie Bourgeois	D	1981–1988	290	16	54	70	788		
Phil Bourque	LW	1983–1996	477	88	111	199	516		
Rene Bourque	RW	2005–2017	725	163	153	316	584		
Dan Boyle	D	1998–2016	1093	163	442	605	693	All-Star Game: 2009, 2011; Second All-Star team: 2006–07, 2008–09	
Tyler Bozak	C	2009–2022	814	170	291	461	236		
Philippe Bozon	LW	1991–1995	144	16	25	41	101		
Curt Brackenbury	RW	1979–1983	141	9	17	26	226		
Rick Bragnalo	C	1975–1979	145	15	35	50	46		
Per-Olov Brasar	LW	1977–1982	348	64	142	206	33		
Donald Brashear	LW	1993–2010	1025	85	120	205	2634		
Sheldon Brookbank	D	2006–2014	351	7	37	44	473		
Wade Brookbank	D	2003–2009	127	6	3	9	345		
Doug Brown	RW	1986–2001	854	160	214	374	210		
J. T. Brown	RW	2011–2019	365	23	49	72	221		
Patrick Brown	C	2014–present	164	10	16	26	75		
Murray Brumwell	D	1980–1988	128	12	31	43	70		
Damien Brunner	RW	2012–2015	121	25	33	58	46		
Fabian Brunnstrom	LW	2008–2012	104	19	22	41	22		
Jiri Bubla	D	1981–1986	256	17	101	118	202		
Marc Bureau	C	1989–2000	567	55	83	138	327		
Alex Burrows	LW	2005–2018	913	205	204	409	1134		
Bobby Butler	RW	2009–2014	130	20	29	49	28		
Drake Caggiula	LW	2016–present	289	46	46	92	141		
Jock Callander	RW	1987–1993	109	22	29	51	116		
Brett Callighen	C	1979–1982	160	56	89	145	132		
Wade Campbell	D	1982–1988	213	9	27	36	305		
Michael Carcone‡	LW	2021–present	157	34	23	57	87		
Ryan Carpenter	C	2015–present	392	32	52	84	122		
Daniel Carr	LW	2015–2021	117	16	21	37	28		
John Carter	LW	1985–1993	244	40	50	90	201		
Ryan Carter	LW	2007–2016	473	41	52	93	444		
Jay Caufield	RW	1986–1993	208	5	8	13	759		
Gino Cavallini	LW	1984–1993	593	114	159	273	507		
Brad Chartrand	C	1999–2004	215	25	25	50	122		
Kelly Chase	RW	1989–2000	458	17	36	53	2017	King Clancy Memorial Trophy: 1997–98	
Denis Chasse	RW	1993–1997	132	11	14	25	292		
Jalen Chatfield‡	D	2021–present	263	21	37	58	133		
Jake Christiansen‡	D	2022–present	112	2	13	15	17		
Mike Christie	D	1974–1981	412	15	101	116	550		
Dino Ciccarelli†	RW	1980–1999	1232	608	592	1200	1425	All-Star Game: 1982, 1983, 1989, 1997	
David Clarkson	RW	2006–2016	570	114	86	200	992		
Dylan Coghlan‡	D	2021–present	112	6	16	22	26		
Cory Conacher	LW	2012–2020	193	28	47	75	118		
Chris Conner	RW	2006–2015	180	22	28	50	38		
Al Conroy	C	1991–1994	114	9	14	23	156		
Riley Cote	RW	2006–2010	156	1	6	7	411		
Geoff Courtnall	LW	1983–2000	1048	367	432	799	1465		
Jeff Cowan	LW	1999–2008	413	47	34	81	695		
Shawn Cronin	D	1988–1995	292	3	18	21	877		
Austin Czarnik	C	2016–present	205	18	33	51	40		
Chris Dahlquist	D	1985–1996	532	19	71	90	488		
Kevin Dallman	D	2005–2008	154	8	23	31	45		
Justin Danforth‡	C	2021–present	183	31	33	64	58		
Dan Daoust	C	1982–1990	522	87	167	254	544	All-Rookie Team: 1982–83	
Mathieu Darche	LW	2000–2012	250	30	42	72	58		
Mal Davis	LW	1978–1986	100	31	22	53	34		
Greg de Vries	D	1995–2009	878	48	146	194	780		
Danny DeKeyser	D	2012–2022	547	33	113	146	266		
Andy Delmore	D	1998–2006	283	43	58	101	105		
Larry DePalma	LW	1985–1994	148	21	20	41	408		
David Desharnais	C	2009–2018	524	87	195	282	160		
Andrew Desjardins	C	2010–2017	408	23	41	64	307		
Raphael Diaz	D	2011–2015	201	8	41	49	62		
Brenden Dillon‡	D	2011–present	974	39	173	212	925		
Mike Donnelly	LW	1986–1997	465	114	121	235	255		
Justin Dowling‡	C	2016–present	152	9	17	26	24		
Aaron Downey	RW	1999–2009	243	8	10	18	494		
Davis Drewiske	D	2008–2013	135	5	20	25	67		
Sheldon Dries	C	2018–2023	122	16	10	26	59		
Steve Duchesne	D	1986–2002	1113	227	525	752	824	All-Rookie Team: 1986–87; All-Star Game: 1989, 1990, 1993	
Rick Dudley	LW	1972–1981	309	75	99	174	292		
Dave Dunn	D	1973–1976	184	14	41	55	313		
Richie Dunn	D	1977–1989	483	36	140	176	314		
Pascal Dupuis	LW	2000–2016	871	190	219	409	387		
Steve Dykstra	D	1985–1990	217	8	32	40	545		
Mark Eaton	D	1999–2013	650	24	61	85	242		
Andrew Ebbett	C	2007–2015	224	26	45	71	50		
Rolf Edberg	C	1978–1981	184	45	58	103	24		
Todd Elik	C	1989–1997	448	110	219	329	453		
Matt Ellis	LW	2006–2015	356	21	28	49	89		
Kari Eloranta	D	1981–1987	267	13	103	116	155		
Jerry Engele	D	1975–1978	100	2	13	15	162		
Bryan Erickson	RW	1983–1994	351	80	125	205	141		
Doug Evans	LW	1985–1993	355	48	87	135	502		
Oscar Fantenberg‡	D	2017–2020	124	5	14	19	34		
Ruslan Fedotenko	LW	2000–2013	863	173	193	366	472		
Taylor Fedun	D	2013–2023	131	8	27	35	44		
Paul Fenton	LW	1984–1992	411	100	83	183	198		
David Fenyves	D	1982–1991	206	3	32	35	119		
Scott Ferguson	D	1997–2006	218	7	14	21	310		
Vernon Fiddler	C	2002–2017	877	104	157	261	558		
Ron Flockhart	C	1980–1989	453	145	183	328	208		
Brian Flynn	RW	2012–2017	275	27	34	61	32		
Christian Folin	D	2013–2020	244	8	36	44	120		
Justin Fontaine	RW	2013–2016	197	27	41	68	58		
Dave Forbes	LW	1973–1979	363	64	64	128	341		
Marc Fortier	C	1987–1993	212	42	60	102	135		
Nick Fotiu	LW	1976–1989	646	60	77	137	1362		
Mark Freer	C	1986–1994	124	16	23	39	61		
Miroslav Frycer	RW	1981–1989	415	147	183	330	486	All-Star Game: 1985	
Robbie Ftorek	F	1972–1985	334	77	150	227	262		
Ryan Garbutt	C	2011–2017	305	39	48	87	283		
Jason Garrison	D	2008–2019	555	49	111	160	229		
Frédérick Gaudreau‡	C	2016–present	410	61	91	152	44		
Brian Gibbons	C	2013–2020	204	25	42	67	58		
Matt Gilroy	D	2009–2014	225	11	37	48	67		
Stephen Gionta	C	2010–2019	301	16	40	56	95		
Mark Giordano	D	2006–present	1148	158	419	577	918	All-Star Game: 2015, 2016, 2020; Norris Trophy: 2018–19	
Bob Girard	LW	1975–1980	305	45	69	114	140		
Dan Girardi	D	2006–2019	927	56	208	264	314	All-Star Game: 2012	
Larry Giroux	D	1973–1980	274	15	74	89	333		
Jeff Giuliano	LW	2005–2008	101	3	10	13	40		
Curtis Glencross	C	2006–2015	507	134	141	275	351		
Luke Glendening‡	C	2013–present	864	83	83	166	308		
Eric Godard	RW	2002–2011	335	6	12	18	833		
Barclay Goodrow‡	C	2014–present	649	65	112	177	584		
Josh Gorges	D	2005–2018	783	17	107	124	404		
John Gould	RW	1971–1980	504	131	138	269	113		
Yanni Gourde‡	C	2015–present	602	133	214	347	454		
Collin Graf	RW	2024-present	121	26	33	59	20		
Hilliard Graves	RW	1970–1980	556	118	163	281	209		
Andy Greene	D	2006–2022	1057	52	212	264	277		
Randy Gregg	D	1982–1992	474	41	152	193	333		
John Grisdale	D	1972–1979	250	4	39	43	346		
Micheal Haley	C	2009–2021	274	11	21	32	692		
Jeff Halpern	C	1999–2014	976	152	221	373	641		
Jeff Hamilton	C	2003–2009	157	32	45	77	44		
Joel Hanley‡	D	2016–present	246	5	33	38	84		
Peter Harrold	D	2006–2015	274	13	29	42	74		
Mark Hartigan	C	2001–2008	102	19	11	30	58		
Garnet Hathaway‡	RW	2015–present	606	75	85	160	680		
Mark Heaslip	RW	1976–1979	117	10	19	29	110		
Anders Hedberg	RW	1978–1985	465	172	225	397	144	All-Star Game: 1985; Bill Masterton Memorial Trophy: 1984–85	
Shawn Heins	D	1998–2004	125	4	12	16	154		
Bryan Helmer	D	1998–2009	146	8	18	26	135		
Jordan Hendry	D	2007–2013	131	4	9	13	40		
Alex Hicks	LW	1995–2000	258	25	54	79	247		
Matthew Highmore‡	LW	2018–present	187	14	21	35	38		
Al Hill	C	1976–1988	221	40	55	95	227		
Jack Hillen	D	2007–2015	304	13	58	71	157		
Ivan Hlinka	C	1981–1983	137	42	81	123	28		
Bill Hogaboam	C	1972–1980	332	80	109	189	100		
Jeff Hoggan	RW	2005–2010	107	2	9	11	76		
Nick Holden	D	2010–2023	654	52	126	178	174		
Gary Holt	LW	1973–1978	101	13	11	24	133		
Dave Hrechkosy	LW	1973–1977	140	42	24	66	41		
Bill Huard	LW	1992–2000	223	16	18	34	594		
Charlie Huddy	D	1980–1997	1017	99	354	453	785	Plus-Minus Award: 1982–83	
Brent Hughes	LW	1988–1997	357	41	39	80	831		
Dryden Hunt‡	LW	2017–present	235	18	36	54	121		
Brad Hunt	D	2013–2023	241	22	54	76	40		
Alex Iafallo‡	LW	2017–present	584	111	151	262	101		
Matt Irwin	D	2012–2023	461	25	68	93	211		
Raitis Ivanans	LW	2005–2012	282	12	6	18	569		
Jim Jackson	LW	1982–1988	112	17	30	47	20		
Tanner Jeannot‡	LW	2021–present	294	49	44	93	403		
Grant Jennings	D	1987–1996	389	14	43	57	804		
Jim Johnson	D	1985–1998	829	29	166	195	1197		
Mike Johnson	RW	1996–2008	661	129	246	375	315	All-Rookie Team: 1997–98	
Reese Johnson‡	C	2021–present	144	7	10	17	103		
Terry Johnson	D	1979–1987	285	3	24	27	580		
Tyler Johnson	C	2012–present	747	193	240	433	250	All-Rookie Team: 2013–14; All-Star Game: 2015	
Ross Johnston‡	LW	2016–present	245	11	21	32	472		
Jean-Francois Jomphe	C	1995–1999	111	10	29	39	102		
Randy Jones	D	2003–2012	365	20	85	105	185		
Josh Jooris	C	2014–2018	213	23	32	55	87		
Dominik Kahun	C	2018–2021	186	34	49	83	16		
Sergey Kalinin	C	2015–2017	121	10	9	19	48		
Anders Kallur	RW	1979–1985	383	101	110	211	149		
David Kampf‡	C	2017–present	536	48	95	143	114		
Melker Karlsson	C	2014–2020	396	60	52	112	130		
Tye Kartye‡	LW	2023–present	140	17	16	33	80		
Mike Keane	RW	1988–2004	1161	168	302	470	881		
Parker Kelly‡	C	2021–present	257	25	29	54	156		
Michal Kempny	D	2016–2022	232	14	47	61	130		
Tim Kerr	RW	1980–1993	655	370	304	674	596	All-Star Game: 1984, 1985, 1986; Bill Masterton Memorial Trophy: 1988–89; Second All-Star team: 1986–87	
Orest Kindrachuk	C	1972–1982	508	118	261	379	648		
Kelly Kisio	C	1982–1995	761	229	429	658	768	All-Star Game: 1993	
Joel Kiviranta‡	LW	2020–present	298	35	25	60	92		
Jon Klemm	D	1991–2008	773	42	100	142	436		
Rob Klinkhammer	LW	2010–2016	193	22	21	43	64		
Ville Koistinen	D	2007–2010	103	8	24	32	40		
Zenon Konopka	C	2005–2014	346	12	18	30	1082		
Chris Kotsopoulos	D	1980–1990	479	44	109	153	827		
Jason Krog	C	1999–2009	202	22	37	59	46		
Torey Krug	D	2011–present	778	89	394	483	374	All-Rookie Team: 2013–14	
Karson Kuhlman	C	2019–2023	147	12	18	30	29		
Dean Kukan	D	2016–2022	153	5	25	30	46		
Chris Kunitz	LW	2003–2019	1022	268	351	619	746	First All-Star team: 2012–13	
Andrei Kuzmenko‡	LW	2022–present	219	72	85	157	34		
Nick Kypreos	LW	1989–1997	442	46	44	90	1210		
Dan Labraaten	LW	1978–1982	268	71	73	144	47		
Randy Ladouceur	D	1982–1996	930	30	126	156	1322		
Mike Lalor	D	1985–1997	687	17	88	105	677		
Denny Lambert	LW	1994–2002	487	27	66	93	1391		
Darren Langdon	LW	1994–2006	521	16	23	39	1251		
Chad LaRose	RW	2005–2013	508	85	95	180	286		
Brian Lashoff	D	2012–2020	136	2	13	15	65		
Jeff Lazaro	LW	1990–1993	102	14	23	37	114		
Brett Lebda	D	2005–2012	397	20	56	76	229		
Stephan Lebeau	C	1988–1995	373	118	159	277	105		
Grant Ledyard	D	1984–2002	1028	90	276	366	766		
Sylvain Lefebvre	D	1989–2003	945	30	154	184	674		
Bryan Lefley	D	1972–1978	228	7	29	36	101		
Ville Leino	LW	2008–2014	286	40	79	119	70		
Mikko Leinonen	C	1981–1985	162	31	78	109	71		
Mark Letestu‡	C	2009–2020	567	93	117	210	90		
Vinni Lettieri	C	2017–present	155	15	17	32	50		
Chris Lindberg	LW	1991–1994	116	17	25	42	47		
Lars Lindgren	D	1978–1984	394	25	113	138	325	All-Star Game: 1980	
Par Lindholm	C	2018–2020	105	4	15	19	22		
Willy Lindstrom	RW	1979–1987	582	161	162	323	200		
Blake Lizotte‡	C	2018–present	379	48	78	126	180		
Ryan Lomberg‡	RW	2019–present	337	31	32	63	416		
Ben Lovejoy	D	2008–2019	544	20	81	101	287		
Jan Ludvig	RW	1982–1989	314	54	87	141	418		
Matt Luff	RW	2018–2023	106	15	12	27	20		
Bengt Lundholm	LW	1981–1986	275	48	95	143	72		
Gary Lupul	C	1979–1986	293	70	75	145	243		
Ilya Lyubushkin‡	D	2018–present	433	6	55	61	219		
Kurtis MacDermid‡	D	2017–present	288	11	20	31	391		
Jacob MacDonald‡	D	2018–present	131	10	17	27	56		
Zack MacEwen‡	RW	2019–present	237	17	17	34	323		
Norm Maciver	D	1986–1998	500	55	230	285	350		
Kyle MacLean‡	C	2024–present	113	8	12	20	25		
Brian MacLellan	LW	1982–1992	606	172	241	413	551		
Jamie Macoun	D	1982–1999	1128	76	282	358	1208	All-Rookie Team: 1983–84	
John Madden	C	1998–2012	898	165	183	348	219	Frank J. Selke Trophy: 2000–01	
Kevin Maguire	RW	1986–1992	260	29	30	59	782		
Dan Mandich	D	1982–1986	111	5	11	16	303		
Kris Manery	F	1977–1981	250	63	64	127	91		
Brandon Manning	D	2011–2020	255	14	34	48	254		
Jonathan Marchessault‡	RW	2014–present	716	251	292	543	348	All-Star Game: 2022; Conn Smythe Trophy: 2023	
Mason Marchment‡	LW	2020–present	302	76	113	189	258		
Andreas Martinsen	LW	2015–2019	152	9	14	23	110		
Alan May	RW	1987–1995	393	31	45	76	1348		
Trent McCleary	RW	1995–2000	192	8	15	23	134		
Andy McDonald	C	2000–2013	685	182	307	489	280	All-Star Game: 2007	
Hubie McDonough	C	1988–1993	195	40	26	66	67		
Jim McElmury	D	1972–1978	180	14	47	61	49		
Jack McIlhargey	D	1974–1982	393	11	36	47	1102		
Steve McKenna	LW	1996–2004	373	18	14	32	824		
Cody McLeod	LW	2007–2019	776	72	55	127	1630		
Bobby McMann‡	C	2023–present	140	35	24	59	81		
George McPhee	LW	1982–1989	115	24	25	49	257		
Marty McSorley	D	1983–2000	961	108	251	359	3381	Plus-Minus Award: 1990–91	
Rick Meagher	C	1979–1991	691	144	165	309	383	Frank J. Selke Trophy: 1989–90	
Jayson Megna	C	2013–present	204	12	21	33	40		
Eric Messier	LW	1996–2004	406	25	50	75	146		
Glen Metropolit	C	1999–2010	407	57	102	159	148		
Freddy Meyer	D	2003–2011	281	20	53	73	155		
Zbynek Michalek	D	2003–2017	784	42	136	178	322		
Ilya Mikheyev‡	RW	2019–present	350	80	85	165	58		
Bill Mikkelson	D	1971–1977	147	4	18	22	105		
Mike Milbury	D	1975–1987	754	49	189	238	1552		
Kevan Miller	D	2013–2021	352	13	58	71	281		
Perry Miller	D	1977–1981	217	10	51	61	387		
Lars Molin	LW	1981–1984	172	33	65	98	37		
Jim Montgomery	C	1993–2003	122	9	25	34	80		
Trevor Moore‡	LW	2018–present	416	94	121	215	102		
George Morrison	LW	1970–1972	115	17	21	38	13		
Mark Mowers	C	1998–2008	278	18	44	62	70		
Bryan Muir	D	1995–2007	279	16	37	53	281		
Joe Mullen†	RW	1981–1997	1062	502	561	1063	241	All-Star Game: 1989, 1990, 1994; First All-Star team: 1988–89; Lady Byng Memorial Trophy: 1986–87, 1988–89; Plus-Minus Award: 1988–89	
Bob J. Murdoch	D	1970–1982	757	60	218	278	764	All-Star Game: 1975	
Bob L. Murdoch	RW	1975–1979	260	72	85	157	127		
Ken Murray	D	1969–1976	106	1	10	11	135		
Philippe Myers‡	D	2019–present	194	10	31	41	87		
Dan Newman	LW	1976–1980	126	17	24	41	63		
Ulf Nilsson	C	1978–1983	170	57	112	169	85		
Tomáš Nosek‡	LW	2015–present	493	45	71	116	162		
Adam Oates†	C	1985–2004	1337	341	1079	1420	415	All-Star Game: 1991, 1992, 1993, 1994, 1997; Second All-Star team: 1990–91	
Liam O'Brien‡	C	2014–present	227	11	24	35	491		
Drew O'Connor‡	LW	2021–present	241	34	41	75	72		
Logan O'Connor‡	RW	2018–present	343	45	58	103	143		
Jeff Odgers	RW	1991–2003	821	75	70	145	2364		
Jordan Oesterle‡	D	2014–present	408	23	73	96	75		
Mathieu Olivier‡	RW	2019–present	250	31	35	66	378		
Colton Orr	RW	2003–2015	477	12	12	24	1186		
Jed Ortmeyer	C	2003–2012	345	22	31	53	161		
Joel Otto	C	1984–1998	943	195	313	508	1934		
Brayden Pachal‡	D	2022–present	138	5	16	21	147		
Doug Palazzari	C	1974–1979	108	18	20	38	23		
Artemi Panarin‡	LW	2015–present	752	302	568	870	222	All-Rookie Team: 2015–16; All-Star Game: 2020, 2023; Calder Memorial Trophy: 2015–16; First All-Star team: 2019–20; Second All-Star team: 2016–17	
Greg Paslawski	RW	1983–1994	650	187	185	372	169		
Colin Patterson	RW	1983–1993	504	96	109	205	239		
Mark Pavelich	C	1981–1992	355	137	192	329	340		
Serge Payer	C	2000–2007	124	7	6	13	49		
Rod Pelley	C	2006–2012	256	9	20	29	102		
Dustin Penner	LW	2005–2014	589	151	159	310	354		
Eric Perrin	C	2003–2009	245	32	72	104	92		
Jorgen Pettersson	LW	1980–1986	435	174	192	366	117		
Rich Peverley	C	2006–2014	442	84	157	241	167		
Dave Pichette	D	1980–1988	322	41	140	181	348		
Gerry Pinder	LW	1969–1972	223	55	69	124	135		
Neal Pionk‡	D	2017–present	536	44	212	256	296		
Steve Poapst	D	1995–2006	307	8	28	36	173		
Thomas Pock	D	2003–2009	118	8	9	17	55		
Mike Polich	C	1976–1981	226	24	29	53	57		
Brian Pothier	D	2000–2010	362	26	92	118	202		
Jean Potvin	D	1970–1981	613	63	224	287	478		
Dave Poulin	C	1982–1995	724	205	325	530	482	All-Star Game: 1986, 1988; Frank J. Selke Trophy: 1986–87; King Clancy Memorial Trophy: 1992–93	
Darroll Powe	C	2008–2014	329	28	28	56	214		
Tom Preissing	D	2003–2010	326	31	101	132	78		
Rich Preston	RW	1979–1987	580	127	164	291	348		
Nate Prosser	D	2009–2019	354	10	37	47	231		
Teddy Purcell	RW	2007–2017	571	101	206	307	102		
Darren Raddysh‡	D	2021–present	176	13	60	73	39		
Brian Rafalski	D	1999–2011	833	79	436	515	282	All-Rookie Team: 1999–2000; All-Star Game: 2004, 2007	
Michael Raffl	LW	2013–2022	514	82	81	163	219		
Dennis Rasmussen	C	2015–2018	139	9	12	21	24		
Pekka Rautakallio	D	1979–1982	235	33	121	154	122	All-Star Game: 1982	
Matt Read	RW	2011–2019	449	88	100	188	83		
Steven Reinprecht	C	1999–2011	663	140	242	382	186		
Pascal Rheaume	C	1996–2006	318	39	52	91	144		
Steve Richmond	D	1983–1989	159	4	23	27	514		
Mike Ridley	C	1985–1997	866	292	466	758	424	All-Rookie Team: 1985–86; All-Star Game: 1989	
Bill Riley	RW	1974–1980	139	31	30	61	320		
Gary Rissling	LW	1978–1985	221	23	30	53	1008		
Patrick Rissmiller	LW	2003–2011	192	18	28	46	60		
Mario Roberge	LW	1990–1995	112	7	7	14	314		
Eric Robinson‡	LW	2018–present	388	54	69	123	69		
Randy Robitaille	C	1996–2008	531	84	172	256	201		
Evan Rodrigues‡	LW	2015–present	547	96	143	239	179		
Stacy Roest	RW	1998–2003	244	28	48	76	54		
Kevin Rooney‡	C	2017–present	330	32	28	60	134		
Bill Root	D	1982–1988	247	11	23	34	180		
Antoine Roussel	LW	2012–2022	607	85	112	197	1063		
Carter Rowney	RW	2016–2022	223	20	37	57	36		
Chad Ruhwedel	D	2013–present	369	13	37	50	94		
Jan Rutta	D	2017–present	417	23	75	98	219		
Derek Ryan	C	2015–present	606	82	127	209	158		
Warren Rychel	LW	1988–1999	406	38	39	77	1422		
Mark Rycroft	RW	2001–2007	226	21	25	46	113		
Rick Rypien	C	2005–2011	119	9	7	16	226		
Borje Salming†	D	1973–1990	1148	150	637	787	1344	All-Star Game: 1976, 1977, 1978; First All-Star team: 1976–77; Second All-Star team: 1974–75, 1975–76, 1978–79, 1979–80	
Gary Sampson	LW	1983–1987	105	13	22	35	25		
Jean-Francois Sauve	C	1980–1987	290	65	138	203	114		
Kevin Sawyer	LW	1995–2003	110	3	3	6	403		
Tim Schaller	LW	2014–2020	276	29	28	57	92		
David Schlemko	D	2008–2019	415	18	76	94	124		
Nate Schmidt‡	D	2013–present	741	52	187	239	152		
John Scott	LW	2008–2016	286	5	6	11	544	All-Star Game: 2016	
Jiri Sekac	LW	2014–2016	108	10	19	25	38		
Tim Sestito	C	2008–2015	101	0	8	8	55		
Ryan Shannon	C	2006–2012	305	35	64	99	90		
Conor Sheary‡	LW	2015–present	593	124	143	267	128		
Neil Sheehy	D	1983–1992	379	18	47	65	1311		
Jody Shelley	LW	2000–2013	627	18	36	54	1538		
Kiefer Sherwood‡	RW	2018–present	265	43	55	98	120		
Radim Simek	D	2018–2023	209	7	22	29	74		
Frank Simonetti	D	1984–1988	115	5	8	13	76		
Todd Simpson	D	1995–2006	580	14	63	77	1357		
Ilkka Sinisalo	RW	1981–1992	582	204	222	426	208		
Brian Skrudland	C	1985–2000	881	124	219	343	1107		
Blake Sloan	RW	1998–2004	290	11	32	43	162		
Doug Smail	LW	1980–1993	845	210	249	459	602	All-Star Game: 1990	
Cole Smith‡	LW	2021–present	229	17	35	52	192		
Trevor Smith	C	2008–2017	107	9	11	20	20		
Jerred Smithson	C	2002–2014	606	39	57	96	363		
Don Spring	D	1980–1984	259	1	54	55	80		
Martin St. Louis†	RW	1998–2015	1134	391	642	1033	310	All-Star Game: 2003, 2004, 2007, 2008, 2009, 2011; Art Ross Trophy: 2003–04, 2012–13; First All-Star team: 2003–04; Hart Memorial Trophy: 2003–04; Lady Byng Memorial Trophy: 2009–10, 2010–11, 2012–13; Plus-Minus Award: 2003–04; Second All-Star team: 2006–07, 2009–10, 2010–11, 2012–13; Ted Lindsay Award: 2003–04	
Daryl Stanley	D	1983–1990	189	8	17	25	408		
Ryan Stanton	D	2012–2016	120	4	23	27	71		
Tim Stapleton	C	2008–2012	118	19	18	37	24		
Marian Stastny	RW	1981–1986	322	121	173	294	110	All-Star Game: 1983	
Peter Stastny†	C	1980–1995	977	450	789	1239	824	All-Star Game: 1981, 1982, 1983, 1984, 1986, 1988; Calder Memorial Trophy: 1980–81	
Brad Staubitz	RW	2008–2013	230	10	11	21	521		
Troy Stecher‡	D	2016–present	560	22	95	117	252		
P. J. Stock	C	1997–2004	235	5	21	26	523		
Nico Sturm‡	C	2018–present	331	46	46	92	86		
Radoslav Suchy	D	1999–2006	451	13	58	71	104		
Andrej Sustr	D	2012–2019	323	10	53	63	147		
Pius Suter‡	C	2020–present	364	82	80	162	76		
Andy Sutton	D	1998–2012	676	38	112	150	1185		
Leif Svensson	D	1978–1980	121	6	40	46	49		
Phil Sykes	LW	1982–1992	456	79	85	164	519		
Brandon Tanev‡	LW	2015–present	552	84	96	180	249		
Christopher Tanev‡	D	2010–present	867	36	172	208	218		
Matt Tennyson	D	2012–2022	165	4	22	26	40		
Gilles Thibaudeau	C	1986–1991	119	25	37	62	40		
Steve Thomas	LW	1984–2004	1235	421	512	933	1306		
Floyd Thomson	LW	1971–1980	411	56	97	153	341		
Patrick Thoresen	C	2006–2008	106	6	18	24	66		
Mark Tinordi	D	1987–1999	663	52	148	200	1514	All-Star Game: 1992	
Dave Tippett	LW	1983–1994	721	93	169	262	317		
Pascal Trepanier	D	1997–2003	229	12	22	34	252		
Wayne Van Dorp	LW	1986–1992	125	12	12	24	565		
Trevor van Riemsdyk‡	D	2014–present	683	25	122	147	211		
Jim Vandermeer	D	2002–2012	436	25	80	105	664		
Frank Vatrano‡	RW	2015–present	645	181	135	316	409	All-Star Game: 2024	
J. P. Vigier	RW	2000–2007	213	23	23	46	97		
Aaron Volpatti	LW	2010–2015	114	5	2	7	137		
Mick Vukota	RW	1987–1998	574	17	29	46	2071		
Sean Walker‡	D	2018–present	395	31	81	112	188		
Tim Wallace	RW	2008–2013	101	4	9	13	45		
Joel Ward	RW	2006–2018	726	133	171	304	261		
Mike Weaver	D	2001–2015	633	8	89	97	227		
Wally Weir	D	1979–1985	320	21	45	66	625		
Duvie Westcott	D	2001–2008	201	11	45	56	299		
Kevin Westgarth	RW	2008–2014	169	7	9	16	266		
Todd White	C	1997–2011	653	141	240	381	228		
Zach Whitecloud‡	D	2017–present	321	21	50	71	158		
Butch Williams	RW	1973–1976	108	14	35	49	131		
Jason Williams	C	2000–2012	455	94	133	227	157		
Ryan Wilson	D	2009–2015	230	7	60	67	157		
Jesse Winchester	C	2007–2014	285	20	50	70	159		
Randy Wood	LW	1986–1997	741	175	159	334	603		
Arber Xhekaj‡	D	2022–present	165	9	20	29	300		
Harry York	C	1996–2000	244	29	46	75	99		
Tom Younghans	RW	1976–1982	429	44	41	85	373		
Nikita Zaitsev	D	2016–2024	482	22	96	118	197		
Egor Zamula‡	D	2021–present	155	8	32	40	44		
Artyom Zub‡	D	2020–present	306	19	65	84	191		
Mats Zuccarello‡	LW	2010–present	904	217	473	690	343		

== See also ==
- Category:Undrafted National Hockey League players
