= Per-Olov Brasar =

Swedish ice hockey player (born 1950)

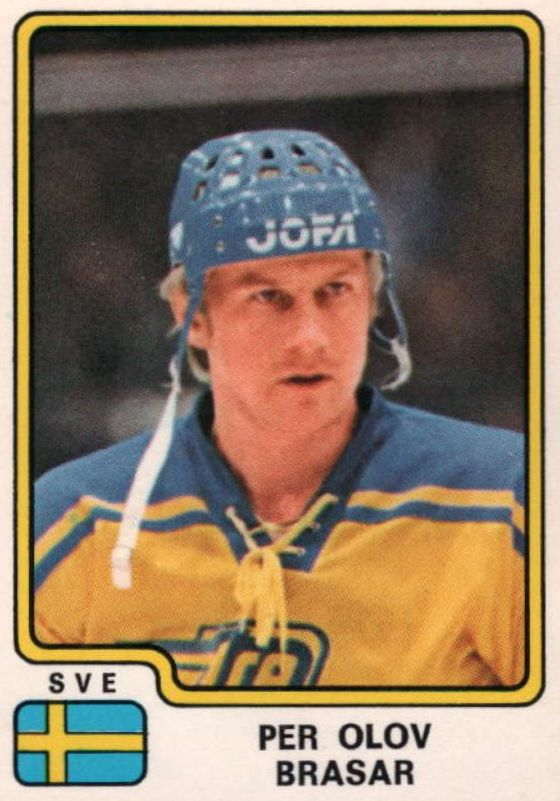
- Born: September 30, 1950 (age 75) Falun, Sweden
- Height: 5 ft 8 in (173 cm)
- Weight: 172 lb (78 kg; 12 st 4 lb)
- Position: Left wing
- Shot: Left
- Played for: Leksands IF; Vancouver Canucks; Minnesota North Stars
- National team: Sweden
- NHL draft: Undrafted
- Playing career: 1969–1983

Per-Olov "Ole" Brasar (born September 30, 1950) is a Swedish former professional ice hockey forward who played 348 games in the National Hockey League with the Minnesota North Stars and Vancouver Canucks, as well as several seasons for Leksands IF in the Swedish Division 1 and Elitserien. He featured in the 1982 Stanley Cup Finals with the Canucks. Internationally Brasar represented Sweden at five World Championships and the 1976 Canada Cup.

== Career statistics ==
=== Regular season and playoffs ===
| | | | Regular season | | | | | Playoffs |
| Season | Team | League | GP | G | A | Pts | PIM | GP | G | A | Pts | PIM |
|---|---|---|---|---|---|---|---|---|---|---|---|---|
| 1964–65 | Leksands IF J18 | SWE-Jr | — | — | — | — | — | — | — | — | — | — |
| 1965–66 | Leksands IF J18 | SWE-Jr | — | — | — | — | — | — | — | — | — | — |
| 1966–67 | Leksands IF J20 | SWE-Jr | — | — | — | — | — | — | — | — | — | — |
| 1967–68 | Leksands IF J20 | SWE-Jr | — | — | — | — | — | — | — | — | — | — |
| 1968–69 | Leksands IF J20 | SWE-Jr | — | — | — | — | — | — | — | — | — | — |
| 1969–70 | Leksands IF | SWE | 27 | 7 | 7 | 14 | 2 | — | — | — | — | — |
| 1970–71 | Leksands IF | SWE | 27 | 11 | 8 | 19 | 0 | — | — | — | — | — |
| 1971–72 | Leksands IF | SWE | 28 | 11 | 7 | 18 | 2 | — | — | — | — | — |
| 1972–73 | Leksands IF | SWE | 28 | 15 | 7 | 22 | 4 | — | — | — | — | — |
| 1973–74 | Leksands IF | SWE | 35 | 17 | 11 | 28 | 13 | — | — | — | — | — |
| 1974–75 | Leksands IF | SWE | 30 | 19 | 23 | 42 | 6 | — | — | — | — | — |
| 1975–76 | Leksands IF | SWE | 34 | 10 | 12 | 22 | 4 | 4 | 1 | 4 | 5 | 6 |
| 1975–76 | Leksands IF | SWE | 36 | 23 | 18 | 41 | 14 | 5 | 3 | 2 | 5 | 0 |
| 1977–78 | Minnesota North Stars | NHL | 77 | 20 | 37 | 57 | 6 | — | — | — | — | — |
| 1978–79 | Minnesota North Stars | NHL | 68 | 6 | 28 | 34 | 6 | — | — | — | — | — |
| 1979–80 | Minnesota North Stars | NHL | 22 | 1 | 14 | 15 | 0 | — | — | — | — | — |
| 1979–80 | Vancouver Canucks | NHL | 48 | 9 | 10 | 19 | 7 | 4 | 1 | 2 | 3 | 0 |
| 1980–81 | Vancouver Canucks | NHL | 80 | 22 | 41 | 63 | 8 | 3 | 0 | 0 | 0 | 0 |
| 1981–82 | Vancouver Canucks | NHL | 53 | 6 | 12 | 18 | 6 | 6 | 0 | 0 | 0 | 0 |
| 1982–83 | Leksands IF | SWE | 35 | 6 | 9 | 15 | 8 | — | — | — | — | — |
| 1983–84 | Mora IK | SWE-2 | 26 | 5 | 12 | 17 | 2 | 4 | 1 | 2 | 3 | 0 |
| SWE totals | | | 280 | 119 | 102 | 221 | 53 | 9 | 4 | 6 | 10 | 6 |
| NHL totals | | | 348 | 64 | 142 | 206 | 33 | 13 | 1 | 2 | 3 | 0 |

=== International ===
| Year | Team | Event | GP | G | A | Pts | PIM |
|---|---|---|---|---|---|---|---|
| 1974 | Sweden | WC | 9 | 4 | 5 | 9 | 0 |
| 1975 | Sweden | WC | 10 | 0 | 1 | 1 | 0 |
| 1976 | Sweden | WC | 10 | 0 | 1 | 1 | 4 |
| 1976 | Sweden | CC | 5 | 0 | 1 | 1 | 2 |
| 1977 | Sweden | WC | 10 | 2 | 9 | 11 | 2 |
| 1978 | Sweden | WC | 10 | 1 | 4 | 5 | 18 |
| Totals | | | 8 | 1 | 1 | 2 | 4 |
