= Mats Waltin =

Swedish ice hockey player and coach

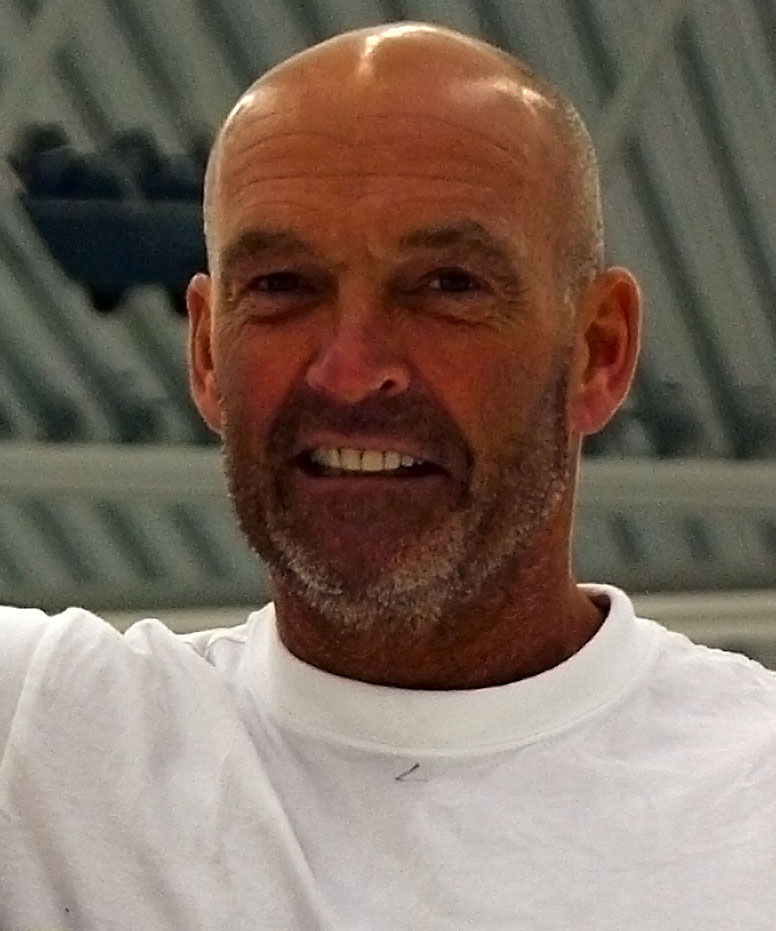
- Mats Waltin in 2009

Personal information
- Born: 7 October 1953 (age 72) Stockholm, Sweden
- Height: 181 cm (5 ft 11 in)
- Weight: 79 kg (174 lb)

Sport
- Sport: Ice hockey
- Club: Södertälje SK (1972–78); Djurgårdens IF Hockey (1978–84); HC Lugano (1984–87); EV Zug (1987–1989); Södertälje SK (1989); Djurgårdens IF Hockey (1990); Södertälje SK (1990–1991)
- Retired: 1991
Medal record
Representing Sweden
Olympic Games
Bronze medal – third place	1980 Lake Placid	Team
Bronze medal – third place	1984 Sarajevo	Team
World Championships
Bronze medal – third place	1975 West Germany	Team
Bronze medal – third place	1976 Poland	Team
Silver medal – second place	1977 Austria	Team
Bronze medal – third place	1979 USSR	Team
Silver medal – second place	1981 Sweden	Team

Mats Stefan Waltin (born 7 October 1953) is a Swedish ice hockey coach and former defenceman. During his career he played 236 international matches and won Olympic bronze medals in 1980 and 1984, world championship silvers in 1977 and 1981, and world championship bronzes in 1975, 1976 and 1979. A the European championships he won silver medals in 1976, 1977 and 1981 and bronzes in 1975, 1978, 1979 and 1983. He was a member of the Swedish 1976 Canada Cup and 1981 Canada Cup teams and served as the team captain at the 1980 Olympics and as the Olympic flag bearer for Sweden at the 1984 games. He was awarded the Stora Grabbars och Tjejers Märke #97 in ice hockey. Domestically Waltin was awarded the Guldpucken as the best player at the 1976 Swedish Championships; he also won the national title with Djurgårdens in 1983. Between 1984 and 1989 he played in Switzerland and won the Swiss title in 1986 and 1987. In 1989, he returned to Sweden, and won his second national title with Djurgårdens in 1990.

Since retiring from competitions in 1991 Waltin works as an ice hockey coach. In 1991–1998 he was the assistant coach and in 1998–2002 head coach of Djurgårdens IF, leading them to the national titles in 2000 and 2001. In 2002 he managed the national team at the world championships and in 2002–2004 served as the manager of Djurgårdens IF. He then went abroad, coaching Klagenfurter AC in Austria in 2004–2006, the Slovenian national team in 2007–2008 and Manglerud Star Ishockey in Norway since 2012.

== Career statistics ==
=== Regular season and playoffs ===
			Regular season					Playoffs
Season	Team	League	GP	G	A	Pts	PIM	GP	G	A	Pts	PIM
1970–71	IK Göta	SWE II	17	15	—	—	—	—	—	—	—	—
1971–72	IK Göta	SWE II	17	16	—	—	—	—	—	—	—	—
1972–73	Södertälje SK	SWE	28	5	6	11	6	—	—	—	—	—
1973–74	Södertälje SK	SWE	32	12	12	24	12	—	—	—	—	—
1974–75	Södertälje SK	SWE	27	2	10	12	14	—	—	—	—	—
1975–76	Södertälje SK	SEL	35	10	12	22	10	—	—	—	—	—
1976–77	Södertälje SK	SEL	33	5	10	15	26	—	—	—	—	—
1977–78	Södertälje SK	SEL	33	3	7	10	22	—	—	—	—	—
1978–79	Djurgårdens IF	SEL	36	12	29	41	22	6	4	2	6	2
1979–80	Djurgårdens IF	SEL	32	12	14	26	10	—	—	—	—	—
1980–81	Djurgårdens IF	SEL	35	11	9	20	12	—	—	—	—	—
1981–82	Djurgårdens IF	SEL	31	11	10	21	12	—	—	—	—	—
1982–83	Djurgårdens IF	SEL	15	5	5	10	8	8	0	4	4	8
1983–84	Djurgårdens IF	SEL	28	3	5	8	6	6	0	0	0	4
1984–85	HC Lugano	NDA	35	12	27	39	—	—	—	—	—	—
1985–86	HC Lugano	NDA	36	11	26	37	18	4	0	3	3	6
1986–87	HC Lugano	NDA	30	7	9	16	16	6	4	4	8	0
1987–88	EV Zug	NDA	34	7	12	19	18	—	—	—	—	—
1988–89	EV Zug	NDA	35	7	17	24	20	3	0	0	0	2
1989–90	Djurgårdens IF	SEL	27	0	2	2	8	1	0	0	0	2
1990–91	Södertälje SK	SEL	40	3	4	7	26	2	0	0	0	0
SWE totals			87	19	28	47	32	—	—	—	—	—
SEL totals			345	75	107	182	162	23	4	6	10	16
NDA totals			170	44	91	135	72	13	4	7	11	8

=== International ===
Year	Team	Event	GP	G	A	Pts	PIM
1975	Sweden	WC	10	1	4	5	4
1976	Sweden	WC	10	1	1	2	0
1976	Sweden	CC	5	0	1	1	0
1977	Sweden	WC	10	0	0	0	2
1978	Sweden	WC	10	0	0	0	2
1979	Sweden	WC	8	1	0	1	2
1980	Sweden	OG	7	1	2	3	4
1981	Sweden	WC	8	0	1	1	2
1981	Sweden	CC	5	0	0	0	2
1983	Sweden	WC	9	0	1	1	0
1984	Sweden	OG	7	2	4	6	2
1985	Sweden	WC	8	0	3	3	4
Senior totals			97	6	17	23	24

Preceded by Stig Östling	Guldpucken; 1976	Succeeded by Kent-Erik Andersson
