= Thommy Abrahamsson =

Swedish ice hockey player (born 1947)

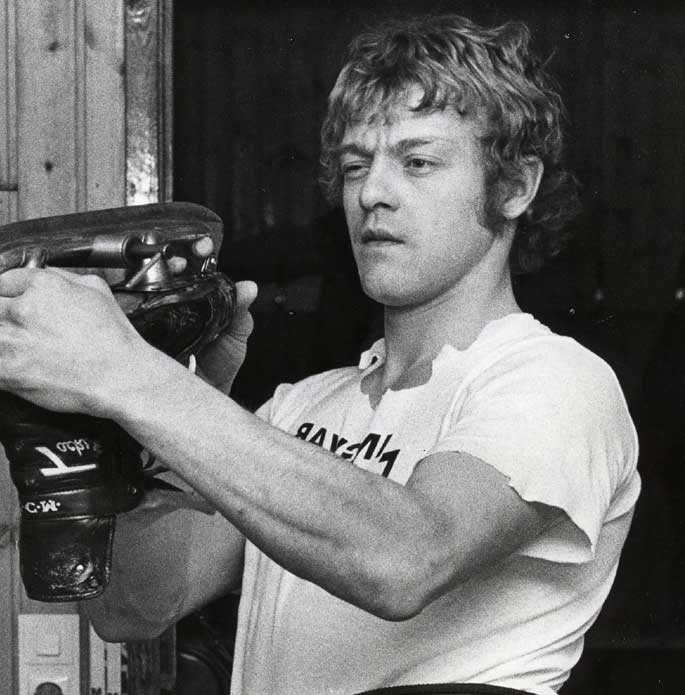
- Born: 8 April 1947 (age 79) Umeå, Sweden
- Height: 6 ft 2 in (188 cm)
- Weight: 185 lb (84 kg; 13 st 3 lb)
- Position: Defence
- Shot: Left
- Played for: Elitserien; Leksands IF; Timrå IK; NHL; Hartford Whalers; WHA; New England Whalers
- National team: Sweden
- Playing career: 1965–1983

Ulf Thomas Abrahamsson (born 8 April 1947) is a retired Swedish ice hockey player. During his career he played in the Swedish Elite League, the National Hockey League and World Hockey Association.

Abrahamsson has a twin brother, Christer Abris, who has legally changed his name. He also played ice hockey, as a goaltender.

== Playing career ==
Abrahamsson played three seasons with the New England Whalers of the WHA from 1974–75 to 1976–77. He also played one season, 1980–81, and 32 games for the Hartford Whalers of the NHL. He represented Sweden at the 1972 Winter Olympics.

== Career statistics ==
=== Regular season and playoffs ===
			Regular season					Playoffs
Season	Team	League	GP	G	A	Pts	PIM	GP	G	A	Pts	PIM
1964–65	Leksands IF	SWE	11	1	1	2	8	14	0	2	2	4
1965–66	Leksands IF	SWE	20	3	5	8	12	7	0	2	2	6
1966–67	Leksands IF	SWE	20	4	5	9	15	2	1	0	1	2
1967–68	Leksands IF	SWE	26	12	6	18	—	—	—	—	—	—
1968–69	Leksands IF	SWE	26	11	9	20	19	—	—	—	—	—
1969–70	Leksands IF	SWE	14	3	4	7	18	14	5	4	9	15
1970–71	Leksands IF	SWE	14	7	4	11	4	14	5	1	6	25
1971–72	Leksands IF	SWE	25	5	14	19	28	—	—	—	—	—
1972–73	Leksands IF	SWE	14	7	3	10	20	14	7	3	10	8
1973–74	Leksands IF	SWE	14	7	4	11	13	21	8	7	15	31
1974–75	New England Whalers	WHA	76	8	22	30	46	6	0	0	0	0
1975–76	New England Whalers	WHA	63	14	21	35	47	17	2	4	6	15
1976–77	New England Whalers	WHA	64	6	24	30	33	5	0	3	3	0
1977–78	Leksands IF	SEL	28	17	5	22	56	—	—	—	—	—
1978–79	Leksands IF	SEL	24	6	3	9	55	4	0	1	1	8
1979–80	Leksands IF	SEL	26	9	6	15	35	—	—	—	—	—
1980–81	Hartford Whalers	NHL	32	6	11	17	16	—	—	—	—	—
1980–81	Binghamton Whalers	AHL	2	0	0	0	2	—	—	—	—	—
1981–82	Timrå IK	SEL	28	10	4	14	44	—	—	—	—	—
1982–83	Timrå IK	SWE II	36	18	18	36	49	—	—	—	—	—
SWE totals			184	60	55	115	—	86	28	17	45	91
WHA totals			203	28	67	95	126	28	2	7	9	15
SEL totals			106	42	18	60	190	4	0	1	1	8

=== International ===
Year	Team	Event	GP	G	A	Pts	PIM
1970	Sweden	WC	10	3	1	4	8
1971	Sweden	WC	9	2	1	3	10
1972	Sweden	OLY	6	1	1	2	2
1972	Sweden	WC	10	0	1	1	14
1973	Sweden	WC	2	1	1	2	0
1974	Sweden	WC	10	0	3	3	6
Senior totals			47	7	8	15	40

Preceded by William Löfqvist	Golden Puck; 1973	Succeeded by Christer Abrahamsson
