= Guldpucken =

- Date: 1956
- Country: Sweden

Guldpucken (The Golden Puck) is awarded annually to the ice hockey player of the year in Sweden. It is similar to the NHL's Hart Memorial Trophy. Originally it was awarded to a player in the Swedish hockey system, the top-level ice hockey league in Sweden. Starting with the 2014–15 season the award began being awarded to players in the NHL who were of Swedish nationality. It should not be confused with Guldhjälmen (The Golden Helmet), the award for the most valuable player according to the players in the SHL.

Erik Karlsson has won the award a record of three times, and is the only player to ever do so. The award has been won twice by four other players: Anders Andersson, Leif Holmqvist, Peter Forsberg and Victor Hedman. The sculpture Guldpucken is made by the Swedish artist Rune Hannäs.

== Winners ==
Player still active

Season	Winner	Team	Position	Win #
1955–56	Åke Lassas	Leksands IF	D	1
1956–57	Hans Öberg	Gävle Godtemplares IK	LW	1
1957–58	Hans Svedberg	Skellefteå AIK	D	1
1958–59	Roland Stoltz	Djurgårdens IF	D	1
1959–60	Ronald Pettersson	Södertälje SK	RW	1
1960–61	Anders Andersson	Skellefteå AIK	C	1
1961–62	Anders Andersson	Skellefteå AIK	C	2
1962–63	Ulf Sterner	Västra Frölunda IF	RW	1
1963–64	Nils Johansson	Alfredshems IK	D	1
1964–65	Gert Blomé	Västra Frölunda IF	D	1
1965–66	Nisse Nilsson	Leksands IF	C	1
1966–67	Bert-Ola Nordlander	AIK	D	1
1967–68	Leif Holmqvist	AIK	G	1
1968–69	Lars-Erik Sjöberg	Leksands IF	D	1
1969–70	Leif Holmqvist	AIK	G	2
1970–71	Håkan Wickberg	Brynäs IF	C	1
1971–72	William Löfqvist	Brynäs IF	G	1
1972–73	Thommy Abrahamsson	Leksands IF	D	1
1973–74	Christer Abrahamsson	Leksands IF	G	1
1974–75	Stig Östling	Brynäs IF	D	1
1975–76	Mats Waltin	Södertälje SK	D	1
1976–77	Kent-Erik Andersson	Färjestad BK	RW	1
1977–78	Rolf Edberg	AIK	C	1
1978–79	Anders Kallur	Djurgårdens IF	W	1
1979–80	Mats Näslund	Brynäs IF	LW	1
1980–81	Peter Lindmark	Timrå IK	G	1
1981–82	Patrik Sundström	IF Björklöven	C	1
1982–83	Håkan Loob	Färjestad BK	RW	1
1983–84	Per-Erik Eklund	AIK	C	1
1984–85	Anders Eldebrink	Södertälje SK	D	1
1985–86	Tommy Samuelsson	Färjestad BK	D	1
1986–87	Håkan Södergren	Djurgårdens IF	LW	1
1987–88	Bo Berglund	AIK	F	1
1988–89	Kent Nilsson	Djurgårdens IF	C	1
1989–90	Rolf Ridderwall	Djurgårdens IF	G	1
1990–91	Thomas Rundqvist	Färjestad BK	F	1
1991–92	Tommy Sjödin	Brynäs IF	D	1
1992–93	Peter Forsberg	Modo Hockey	C	1
1993–94	Peter Forsberg	Modo Hockey	C	2
1994–95	Tomas Jonsson	Leksands IF	D	1
1995–96	Jonas Bergqvist	Leksands IF	RW	1
1996–97	Jörgen Jönsson	Färjestad BK	C	1
1997–98	Ulf Dahlén	HV71	RW	1
1998–99	Daniel Sedin	Modo Hockey	LW	1
1998–99	Henrik Sedin	Modo Hockey	C	1
1999–00	Mikael Johansson	Djurgårdens IF	C	1
2000–01	Mikael Renberg	Luleå HF	RW	1
2001–02	Henrik Zetterberg	Timrå IK	C	1
2002–03	Niklas Andersson	Västra Frölunda HC	LW	1
2003–04	Johan Davidsson	HV71	C	1
2004–05	Henrik Lundqvist	Frölunda HC	G	1
2005–06	Kenny Jönsson	Rögle BK	D	1
2006–07	Per Svartvadet	Modo Hockey	C	1
2007–08	Stefan Liv	HV71	G	1
2008–09	Jonas Gustavsson	Färjestad BK	G	1
2009–10	Magnus Johansson	Linköpings HC	D	1
2010–11	Viktor Fasth	AIK	G	1
2011–12	Jakob Silfverberg	Brynäs IF	LW	1
2012–13	Jimmie Ericsson	Skellefteå AIK	LW	1
2013–14	Joakim Lindström	Skellefteå AIK	C	1
2014–15	Victor Hedman	Tampa Bay Lightning	D	1
2015–16	Erik Karlsson	Ottawa Senators	D	1
2016–17	Erik Karlsson	Ottawa Senators	D	2
2017–18	William Karlsson	Vegas Golden Knights	C	1
2018–19	Robin Lehner	New York Islanders	G	1
2019–20	Not awarded due to the COVID-19 pandemic in Sweden			
2020–21	Victor Hedman	Tampa Bay Lightning	D	2
2021–22	Gabriel Landeskog	Colorado Avalanche	LW	1
2022–23	Erik Karlsson	San Jose Sharks	D	3
2023–24	Gustav Forsling	Florida Panthers	D	2
2024–25	William Nylander	Toronto Maple Leafs	F	1
2025–26	Rasmus Dahlin	Buffalo Sabres	D	1

== Sources ==
- A to Z of Ice Hockey
- Guldpucken winners on Expressen.se
- Guldpucken winners on Elite Prospects
