= Leif Svensson =

Swedish ice hockey player

- Born: July 8, 1951 (age 73); Härnösand, Sweden
- Height: 6 ft 3 in (191 cm)
- Weight: 190 lb (86 kg; 13 st 8 lb)
- Position: Defence
- Shot: Left
- Played for: Djurgårdens IF; Södertälje SK; Washington Capitals
- National team: Sweden
- NHL draft: Undrafted
- Playing career: 1969–1982

Leif Gunnar Svensson (born July 8, 1951) is a Swedish former ice hockey player. He played 121 games in the National Hockey League with the Washington Capitals during the 1978–79 and 1979–80 seasons. The rest of his career, which lasted from 1969 to 1982, was spent Sweden.

== Playing career ==
Svensson played with Nacka HK, Södertälje SK, and Djurgårdens IF in Sweden before being signed as a free agent by the Washington Capitals on June 10, 1978. He played on the Swedish national team, winning a bronze medal at the 1979 World Championships. After his stint with the Capitals, Svensson played two years with Djurgården before retiring in 1982.

== Career statistics ==
=== Regular season and playoffs ===
			Regular season					Playoffs
Season	Team	League	GP	G	A	Pts	PIM	GP	G	A	Pts	PIM
1969–70	Djurgårdens IF	SWE	1	0	1	1	0	—	—	—	—	—
1970–71	Nacka HK	SWE-2	6	2	2	4	6	—	—	—	—	—
1971–72	Nacka HK	SWE-2	7	1	5	6	6	—	—	—	—	—
1972–73	Södertälje SK	SWE	18	5	1	6	14	—	—	—	—	—
1973–74	Södertälje SK	SWE	35	9	4	13	24	—	—	—	—	—
1974–75	Djurgårdens IF	SWE	28	2	7	9	30	6	0	1	1	6
1975–76	Djurgårdens IF	SEL	36	5	13	18	50	—	—	—	—	—
1976–77	Djurgårdens IF	SWE-2	31	7	15	22	43	9	2	3	5	10
1977–78	Djurgårdens IF	SEL	29	2	6	8	34	—	—	—	—	—
1978–79	Washington Capitals	NHL	74	2	29	31	28	—	—	—	—	—
1979–80	Washington Capitals	NHL	47	4	11	15	21	—	—	—	—	—
1980–81	Djurgårdens IF	SEL	18	1	2	3	20	—	—	—	—	—
1981–82	Djurgårdens IF	SEL	18	2	3	5	18	—	—	—	—	—
SEL totals			101	10	24	34	132	—	—	—	—	—
NHL totals			121	6	40	46	49	—	—	—	—	—

=== International ===
Medal record

Representing Sweden

World Championships
Bronze medal – third place	1979 Soviet Union	

Year	Team	Event	GP	G	A	Pts	PIM
1979	Sweden	WC	8	0	0	0	6
Senior totals			8	0	0	0	6
