= Rolf Edberg =

Swedish ice hockey player

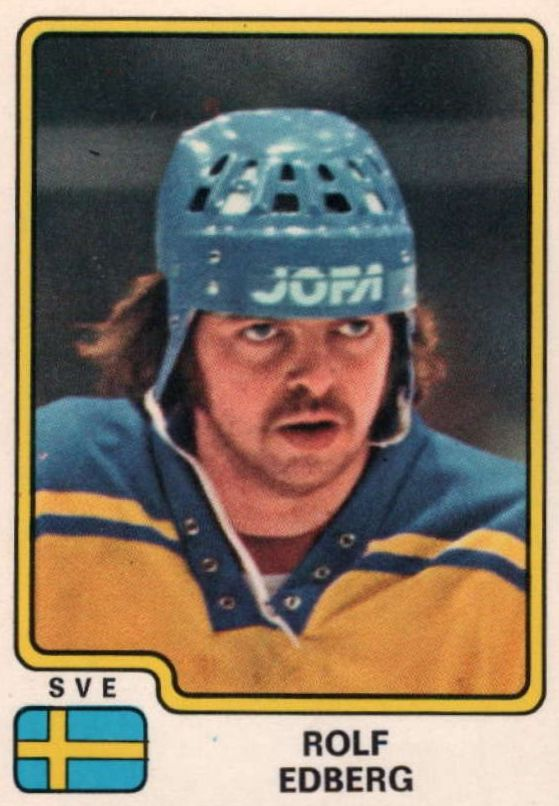
- Born: 29 September 1950 (age 76) Stockholm, Sweden
- Height: 5 ft 10 in (178 cm)
- Weight: 174 lb (79 kg; 12 st 6 lb)
- Position: Centre
- Shot: Left
- Played for: Washington Capitals
- National team: Sweden
- NHL draft: Undrafted
- Playing career: 1966–1985

Medal record

Representing Sweden

Ice hockey

European Junior Championships
Bronze medal – third place	1968 Finland	

World Championships
Silver medal – second place	1977 Austria	
Bronze medal – third place	1979 Soviet Union	

Rolf Arne "Råttan (The Rat)" Edberg (born 29 September 1950) is a Swedish retired ice hockey player.

After playing in Sweden for many years, Edberg signed as a free agent with the Washington Capitals. After playing three seasons with the Capitals, Edberg returned to Sweden where he played for several more years before retiring.

Edberg should not be confused with his namesake, the well-known Swedish journalist, author, member of parliament and ambassador Rolf Edberg.

== Career statistics ==
=== Regular season and playoffs ===
			Regular season					Playoffs
Season	Team	League	GP	G	A	Pts	PIM	GP	G	A	Pts	PIM
1966–67	Hammarby IF	SWE II	22	10	6	16	—	—	—	—	—	—
1967–68	Hammarby IF	SWE II	—	—	—	—	—	—	—	—	—	—
1968–69	Hammarby IF	SWE	20	7	5	12	4	—	—	—	—	—
1969–70	Hammarby IF	SWE II	—	—	—	—	—	—	—	—	—	—
1970–71	AIK	SWE	14	9	9	18	10	14	8	4	12	14
1971–72	AIK	SWE	14	6	9	15	8	14	3	4	7	14
1972–73	AIK	SWE	12	5	2	7	8	13	5	3	8	10
1973–74	AIK	SWE	14	8	6	14	4	20	11	10	21	18
1974–75	AIK	SWE	30	17	15	32	18	—	—	—	—	—
1975–76	AIK	SEL	36	14	13	27	31	—	—	—	—	—
1976–77	AIK	SEL	35	11	14	25	30	—	—	—	—	—
1977–78	AIK	SEL	23	5	9	14	14	5	2	3	5	4
1978–79	Washington Capitals	NHL	76	14	27	41	6	—	—	—	—	—
1979–80	Washington Capitals	NHL	63	23	23	46	12	—	—	—	—	—
1980–81	Washington Capitals	NHL	45	8	8	16	6	—	—	—	—	—
1981–82	AIK	SEL	29	16	11	27	34	7	2	0	2	2
1982–83	AIK	SEL	29	9	15	24	6	3	1	1	2	2
1983–84	Hammarby IF	SWE II	29	14	18	32	12	12	5	10	15	—
1984–85	Hammarby IF	SEL	20	8	4	12	14	—	—	—	—	—
SWE totals			104	52	46	98	52	61	27	21	48	56
SEL totals			172	63	66	129	125	15	5	4	9	8
NHL totals			184	45	58	103	24	—	—	—	—	—

=== International ===
Year	Team	Event	GP	G	A	Pts	PIM
1968	Sweden	EJC	5	4	1	5	2
1977	Sweden	WC	10	5	3	8	2
1978	Sweden	WC	10	8	7	15	4
1979	Sweden	WC	6	4	3	7	2
Junior totals			5	4	1	5	2
Senior totals			26	17	13	30	8
