= Wickberg =

Wickberg is a surname. Notable people with the surname include:

- Nils Erik Wickberg (1909–2002), Finnish architect, professor of architecture, and editor-in-chief
- Håkan Wickberg (1943–2009), Swedish ice hockey player
