= Lars Lindgren =

Swedish ice hockey player and scout

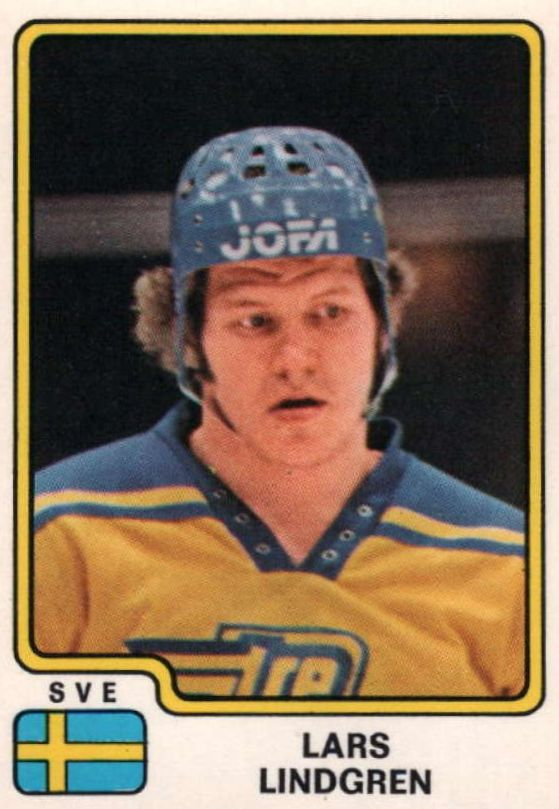
- Born: October 13, 1952 (age 73) Piteå, Sweden
- Height: 6 ft 1 in (185 cm)
- Weight: 200 lb (91 kg; 14 st 4 lb)
- Position: Defence
- Shot: Left
- Played for: Vancouver Canucks; Minnesota North Stars
- National team: Sweden
- NHL draft: Undrafted
- Playing career: 1972–1991

Lars Sune Lindgren (born October 13, 1952) is a Swedish former ice hockey defenceman and a professional scout with the Vancouver Canucks of the National Hockey League (NHL). He featured in the 1982 Stanley Cup Finals with the Vancouver Canucks.

Lindgren started his career with Canucks as a player in 1978, after having played for Modo Hockey in Sweden. He also played for the Minnesota North Stars. He left the NHL after the 1984 season. He played four seasons between 1984–88 for Luleå HF of the SEL. He later became a coach for the team.

He was inducted into the Piteå Wall of Fame in 2006.

== Career statistics ==
=== Regular season and playoffs ===
| | | | Regular season | | | | | Playoffs |
| Season | Team | League | GP | G | A | Pts | PIM | GP | G | A | Pts | PIM |
|---|---|---|---|---|---|---|---|---|---|---|---|---|
| 1970–71 | Piteå IF | SWE II | 18 | 3 | 3 | 6 | — | — | — | — | — | — |
| 1971–72 | Piteå IF | SWE II | 18 | 6 | 6 | 12 | — | — | — | — | — | — |
| 1972–73 | Skellefteå AIK | SWE | 19 | 1 | 5 | 6 | 18 | 6 | 1 | 2 | 3 | 8 |
| 1973–74 | Piteå IF | SWE II | 23 | 5 | 14 | 19 | — | — | — | — | — | — |
| 1974–75 | Modo AIK | SWE | 30 | 4 | 8 | 12 | 20 | — | — | — | — | — |
| 1975–76 | Modo AIK | SEL | 36 | 2 | 6 | 8 | 22 | — | — | — | — | — |
| 1976–77 | Modo AIK | SEL | 35 | 6 | 6 | 12 | 36 | 1 | 0 | 0 | 0 | 2 |
| 1977–78 | Modo AIK | SEL | 33 | 1 | 9 | 10 | 50 | 2 | 0 | 0 | 0 | 6 |
| 1978–79 | Vancouver Canucks | NHL | 64 | 2 | 19 | 21 | 68 | 3 | 0 | 0 | 0 | 6 |
| 1979–80 | Vancouver Canucks | NHL | 73 | 5 | 30 | 35 | 66 | 2 | 0 | 1 | 1 | 0 |
| 1980–81 | Vancouver Canucks | NHL | 52 | 4 | 18 | 22 | 32 | — | — | — | — | — |
| 1981–82 | Vancouver Canucks | NHL | 75 | 5 | 16 | 21 | 74 | 16 | 2 | 4 | 6 | 6 |
| 1982–83 | Vancouver Canucks | NHL | 64 | 6 | 14 | 20 | 48 | 4 | 1 | 1 | 2 | 2 |
| 1983–84 | Vancouver Canucks | NHL | 7 | 1 | 2 | 3 | 4 | — | — | — | — | — |
| 1983–84 | Minnesota North Stars | NHL | 59 | 2 | 14 | 16 | 33 | 15 | 2 | 0 | 2 | 6 |
| 1984–85 | Luleå HF | SEL | 33 | 8 | 3 | 11 | 46 | — | — | — | — | — |
| 1985–86 | Luleå HF | SEL | 35 | 2 | 7 | 9 | 32 | — | — | — | — | — |
| 1986–87 | Luleå HF | SEL | 35 | 4 | 9 | 13 | 42 | 3 | 0 | 0 | 0 | 2 |
| 1987–88 | Luleå HF | SEL | 40 | 2 | 7 | 9 | 52 | — | — | — | — | — |
| 1988–89 | Piteå HC | SWE II | 2 | 0 | 0 | 0 | 0 | — | — | — | — | — |
| 1989–90 | Piteå HC | SWE II | 2 | 0 | 0 | 0 | 2 | — | — | — | — | — |
| 1990–91 | Piteå HC | SWE II | 3 | 0 | 1 | 1 | 2 | — | — | — | — | — |
| SEL totals | | | 247 | 25 | 47 | 72 | 280 | 6 | 0 | 0 | 0 | 10 |
| NHL totals | | | 394 | 25 | 113 | 138 | 325 | 40 | 5 | 6 | 11 | 20 |

=== International ===
| Year | Team | Event | GP | G | A | Pts | PIM |
|---|---|---|---|---|---|---|---|
| 1977 | Sweden | WC | 10 | 1 | 1 | 2 | 8 |
| 1978 | Sweden | WC | 10 | 2 | 3 | 5 | 8 |
| 1981 | Sweden | CC | 5 | 0 | 1 | 1 | 6 |
| Senior totals | | | 25 | 3 | 5 | 8 | 22 |
