= Håkan Wickberg =

Swedish ice hockey player

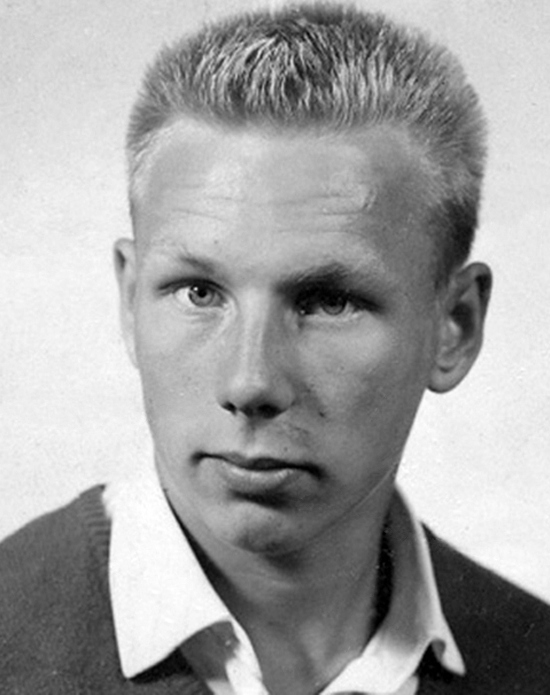
- Born: 3 February 1943 Sandviken, Sweden
- Died: 8 December 2009 (aged 66) Gävle, Sweden
- Height: 5 ft 8 in (173 cm)
- Weight: 174 lb (79 kg; 12 st 6 lb)
- Position: Centre
- Shot: Left
- Played for: Brynäs IF
- National team: Sweden
- Playing career: 1959–1976

Håkan Wickberg
Medal record

World Championships
Silver medal – second place	1970 Sweden	Sweden
Silver medal – second place	1973 Soviet Union	Sweden

Håkan Nils "Wicke" Wickberg (3 February 1943 – 8 December 2009) was a Swedish ice hockey centre who played over 300 games with Brynäs IF, winning the Swedish National Championship seven times as a player. He was awarded Guldpucken for the season of 1970–71.

He finished forth with the Sweden men's national ice hockey team at the 1968 and 1972 Winter Olympics, and won silver medals at the 1970 and 1973 World Championships.

Preceded by Leif Holmqvist	Golden Puck; 1971	Succeeded by William Löfqvist
