= Stig Östling =

Swedish ice hockey player

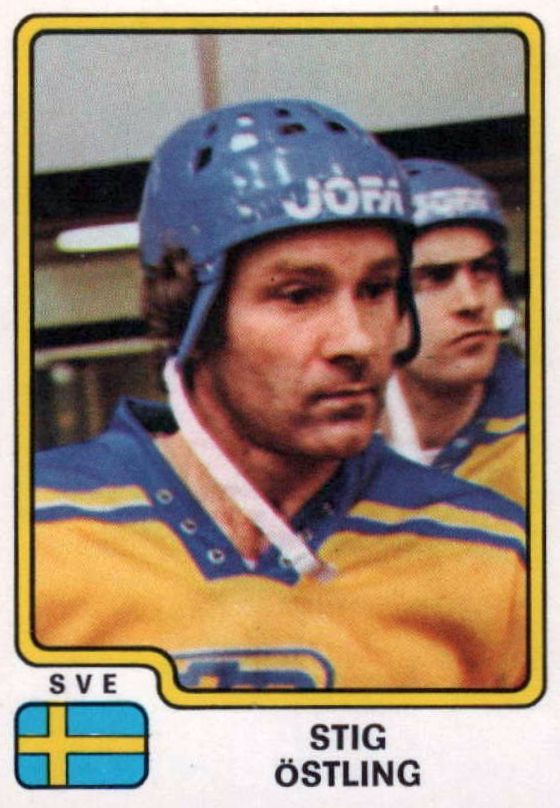
- Born: 31 December 1948 (age 76); Sweden
- Height: 5 ft 10 in (178 cm)
- Weight: 174 lb (79 kg; 12 st 6 lb)
- Position: Defence
- Caught: Left
- Played for: Mora IK; Brynäs IF
- National team: Sweden
- Playing career: 1966–1984

Stig Östling
Medal record

Men's World Championships
Bronze medal – third place	1975 West Germany	Sweden
Bronze medal – third place	1976 Poland	Sweden
Silver medal – second place	1981 Sweden	Sweden

Stig Arne Holger Östling (born 31 December 1948) is a Swedish former ice hockey defenceman. He played for Mora IK from 1966 to 1970 and for Brynäs IF from 1970 to 1984 (winning the Swedish championship in 1971, 1972, 1976, 1977 and 1980).

He competed as a member of the Sweden men's national ice hockey team at the 1972 Winter Olympics held in Japan.

He was named Swedish Player of the Year (the Golden Puck) in 1974–75.

Preceded by Christer Abrahamsson	Guldpucken; 1975	Succeeded by Mats Waltin
