= Leif Holmqvist =

Swedish ice hockey player (born 1942)

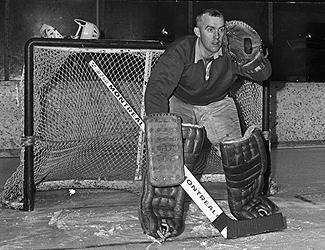
- Holmqvist in 1968
- Born: 12 November 1942 (age 84) Gävle, Sweden
- Height: 5 ft 9 in (175 cm)
- Weight: 172 lb (78 kg; 12 st 4 lb)
- Position: Goaltender
- Caught: Left
- Played for: Strömsbro IF; AIK; London Lions; Indianapolis Racers; HV71; Hanhals IF
- National team: Sweden
- Playing career: 1958–1982
Medal record
Men's ice hockey
Representing Sweden
World Championships
Bronze medal – third place	1965 Tampere
Silver medal – second place	1967 Vienna
Silver medal – second place	1969 Stockholm
Silver medal – second place	1970 Stockholm
Bronze medal – third place	1971 Bern
Bronze medal – third place	1972 Prague

Leif Erik "Honken" Holmqvist (born 12 November 1942) is a Swedish retired ice hockey goaltender. He is one of only four players to win the Golden Puck award twice, which he did while playing for AIK.

Holmqvist played a season in England for the London Lions and one in the United States for the Indianapolis Racers.

He competed as a member of the Sweden men's national ice hockey team at the 1968 and 1972 Winter Olympics.

Holmqvist was named best goaltender at the 1969 IIHF World Championships. After retiring from hockey, Holmqvist coached in the Norwegian National League.

He was inducted into the IIHF Hall of Fame in 1999.

== Career statistics ==
			Regular season									Playoffs
Season	Team	League	GP	W	L	T	MIN	GA	SO	GAA	SV%	GP	W	L	T	MIN	GA	SO	GAA	SV%
1975–76	Indianapolis Racers	WHA	19	6	9	3	1079	54	0	3.00	.896	—	—	—	—	—	—	—	—	—

Preceded by Bert-Ola Nordlander	Golden Puck; 1968	Succeeded by Lars-Erik Sjöberg
Preceded by Lars-Erik Sjöberg	Golden Puck; 1970	Succeeded by Håkan Wickberg
