= William Löfqvist =

Swedish ice hockey player and golfer

- Born: 12 April 1947 Gävle, Sweden
- Died: 23 October 2016 (aged 69) Gävle, Sweden
- Height: 5 ft 10 in (178 cm)
- Weight: 167 lb (76 kg; 11 st 13 lb)
- Position: Goaltender
- Caught: Left
- Played for: Strömsbro IF; Brynäs IF
- National team: Sweden
- Playing career: 1967–1983
Medal record
Representing Sweden
Men's ice hockey
Olympic Games
Bronze medal – third place	1980 Lake Placid	Team
World Championships
Bronze medal – third place	1973 Poland
Silver medal – second place	1973 Soviet Union
Bronze medal – third place	1971 Switzerland

Sven William "Wille" Löfqvist (12 April 1947 – 23 October 2016) was a Swedish ice hockey goaltender who played for the Swedish national team. He was part of the Swedish team earning a bronze medal at the 1980 Winter Olympics in Lake Placid, New York, United States. He later became a professional golfer and played on the Swedish Golf Tour.

== Ice hockey career ==
Löfqvist was born and grew up in Gävle, Sweden. He began playing ice hockey as a teenager and became a goaltender by coincidence. 18 years old he played his first season in local ice hockey club Strömsbro IF, at the time in the Swedish second division.

After three seasons in Strömsbro IF and helping the team advance to the Swedish first division, Löfqvist was recruited to local competitor and reigning Swedish champions Brynäs IF for the 1968–69 season. He was part of the team, mostly as their first goal tender and playing 500 games, for 15 seasons in the highest Swedish hockey league, winning the Swedish national ice hockey championship six times in eleven years 1970, 1971, 1972, 1976, 1977, 1980.

For the 1971–72 season, Löfqvist was awarded The Golden Puck by the Swedish Ice Hockey Association and the newspaper Expressen, as the best Swedish player in the highest Swedish hockey league.

He played 105 matches in the Swedish national team, 37 of them in World Championships, Olympic Games or the Canada Cup.

After the 1982-83 season, Löfqvist retired from ice hockey and turned professional in golf.

=== Awards and honors ===
- 1972 The Golden Puck as Swedish Ice Hockey Player of the Year
- Elit Sign No. 90 by the Swedish Ice Hockey Association
- Jersey number 1 hoisted in Brynäs IF home arena

== Golf career ==
With parents not playing golf, Löfqvist at around 12 years of age, together with friends, search for golf balls around Gävle Golf Club close to his home in Gävle, Sweden, to earn money to buy his first golf clubs. He convinced his father Sven to pay for his member fee in the club and in a few years he had won junior championships on both club and district level. By 1966, Löfqvist was among the top twelve junior golfers in his country and the year after he was selected for a national team camp.

In 1972, Löfqvist won the Norrland Championship (one of three regions in Sweden, covering the northern half of the area of the country). Two weeks in a row in July 1975, Löfqvist won successive national 72-hole amateur tournaments. On August 1, 1976, Löfqvist won the Norrland Championship again. After the victory, Löfqvist ended his golf season due to his participation in the first Canada Cup ice hockey tournament, with the top six national professional teams in the world meeting a month later in Canada.

Despite Löfqvist was in the middle of his ice hockey career, as a goal keeper in both the dominant Swedish club and the national team, he reached handicap scratch in 1977. The same spring he finished second in one of the most prestigious amateur tournaments in Sweden, Slottspokalen at Uppsala Golf Club.

After turning professional in 1983, Löfqvist played tournaments in Sweden and joined the Swedish Golf Tour, with its inaugural season 1984, but played a reduced schedule and with limited success. His best finish in 1983 was tied 6th at Gevalia Open on his home course Gävle Golf Club, helping him to finishing 22nd on the 1983 Swedish Professional Order of Merit. On the Swedish Golf Tour his best finish came to be tied 26th at the 1984 Martini Cup at Rya Golf Club.

Löfqvist's eldest son Robert also became a golf professional. He was part of the team winning the Swedish national club team championship for Gävle Golf Club in 1997. Löfqvist and his son won the Swedish Father and Son Championship, over 36 holes foursome stroke-play, three times. The tournament was at the time, due to Sweden's "open golf"-policy since 1983, not restricted to amateurs only, but it was without prize-money.

=== Amateur wins ===
- 1972 BP Cup (Sundsvall), Norrland Championship
- 1974 Sandvik Open (Högbo)
- 1975 Söderhamn 72-hole Tournament, Fyris-Neon Open (Gävle)
- 1976 Norrland Championship
- 1980 Jörn Trä Open (Skellefteå)
- 1981 Tolvslaget (Boden)
- 1982 Scandinavian Foursome (with (Olle Hedblom)
- 1983 Swedish Father and Son Championship (with Robert Löfqvist)
- 1984 Swedish Father and Son Championship (with Robert Löfqvist)
- 2001 Swedish Father and Son Championship (with Robert Löfqvist)

== Death and funeral ==
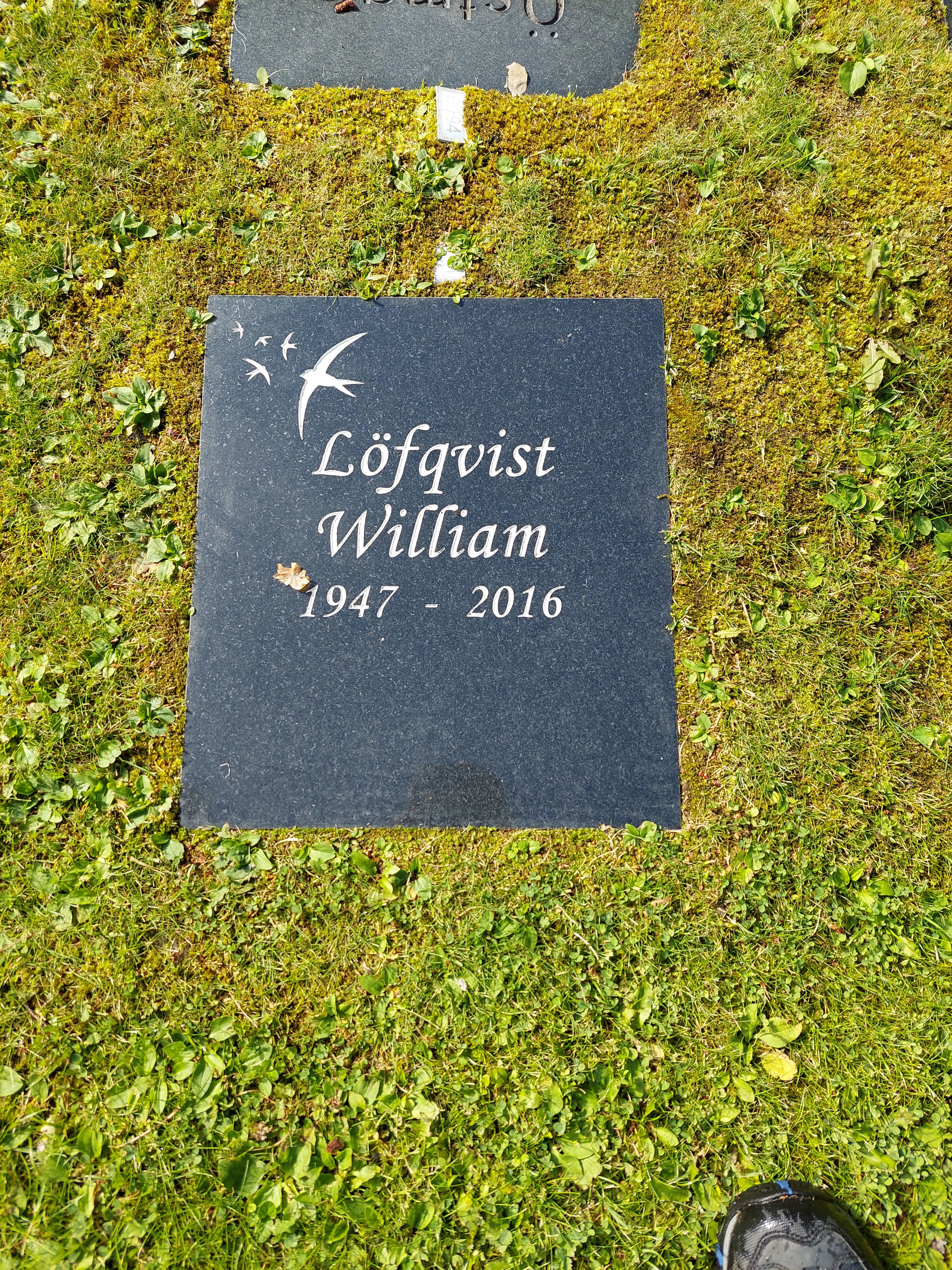
William Löfqvist's grave at the Forest Cemetery in Gävle.

Löfqvist died on 23 October 2016 at the age of 69, from breast cancer, and attempted to raise awareness that men can also be affected.

On 27 October 2016, a memorial ceremony for William Löfqvist was held inside the Gavlerinken Arena before the SHL game Brynäs IF–HV71. On 18 november the same year, he was buried inside the Hille Church.
