= Christer Abrahamsson =

Swedish ice hockey player and coach

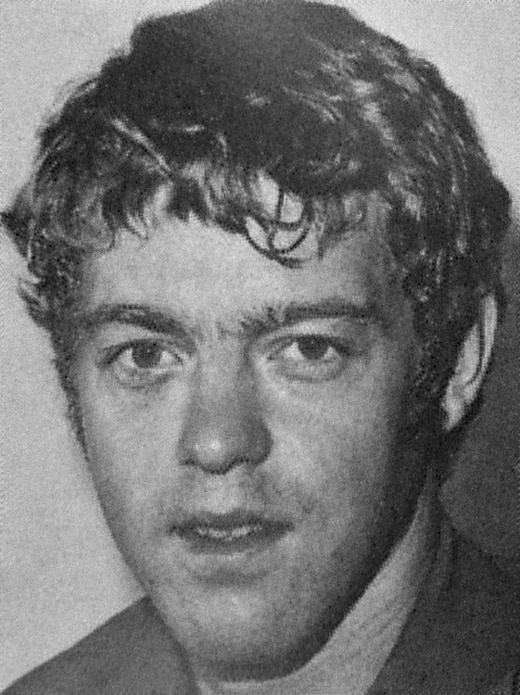
- Born: 8 April 1947 (age 79) Umeå, Sweden
- Height: 6 ft 0 in (183 cm)
- Weight: 159 lb (72 kg; 11 st 5 lb)
- Position: Goaltender
- Caught: Left
- Played for: Leksands IF; New England Whalers
- National team: Sweden
- Playing career: 1964–1982

Kurt Christer Abrahamsson (born 8 April 1947), also known as Christer Abris, is a Swedish former ice hockey goaltender and coach.

Abrahamsson played for Leksands IF in two stints (1965–1974 and 1977–1982) winning the Swedish championship in 1969, 1973 and 1974), and for the World Hockey Association's New England Whalers from 1974 to 1977. He also played for the Swedish national team in the IIHF World Championships five times (helping win the silver medal in 1973 and 1981, and the bronze medal in 1972 and 1974), and in the 1972 Winter Olympics. He was awarded Guldpucken in 1973–74 as Swedish Player of the Year.

His twin brother Thommy Abrahamsson also played ice hockey, as a defenceman.

== Career statistics ==
=== Regular season and playoffs ===
| | | | Regular season | | | | | | | | | Playoffs |
| Season | Team | League | GP | W | L | T | MIN | GA | SO | GAA | SV% | GP | W | L | MIN | GA | SO | GAA | SV% |
|---|---|---|---|---|---|---|---|---|---|---|---|---|---|---|---|---|---|---|---|
| 1974–75 | New England Whalers | WHA | 16 | 8 | 6 | 1 | 870 | 47 | 1 | 3.24 | .907 | – | – | – | – | – | – | – | – |
| 1975–76 | New England Whalers | WHA | 41 | 18 | 18 | 2 | 2385 | 136 | 2 | 3.42 | .889 | 1 | 0 | 0 | 1 | 0 | 0 | – | – |
| 1976–77 | New England Whalers | WHA | 45 | 15 | 22 | 4 | 2484 | 159 | 0 | 3.84 | .889 | 2 | 0 | 1 | 90 | 5 | 0 | 3.30 | .902 |
| 1977–78 | Leksands IF | SEL | 33 | – | – | – | 1964 | 128 | 0 | 3.91 | – | – | – | – | – | – | – | – | – |
| 1978–79 | Leksands IF | SEL | 26 | Statistics Unavailable |
| 1979–80 | Leksands IF | SEL | 34 | Statistics Unavailable |
| 1980–81 | Leksands IF | SEL | 30 | – | – | – | – | 118 | 0 | 3.93 | .873 | – | – | – | – | – | – | – | – |
| WHA totals | | | 102 | 41 | 46 | 7 | 5739 | 342 | 3 | 3.58 | .892 | 3 | 0 | 1 | 91 | 5 | 0 | 3.30 | .902 |

| Preceded by Thommy Abrahamsson | Guldpucken; 1974 | Succeeded by Stig Östling |
