= Andreas Appelgren =

Swedish ice hockey coach (born 1967)

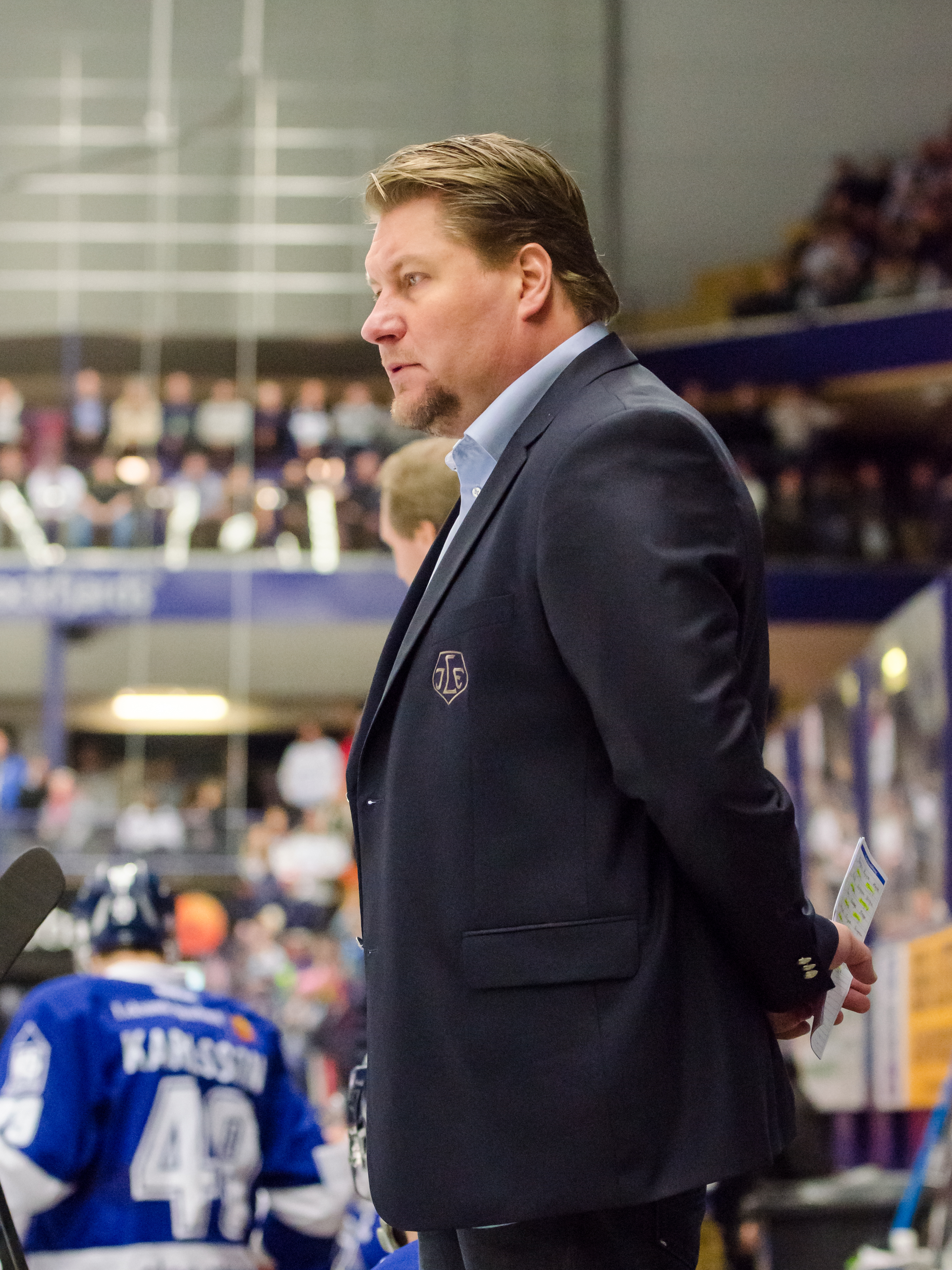
- Born: July 28, 1967 (age 58); Sweden
- Occupation: Head Coach
- Employer: Leksands IF
- Predecessor: Christer Olsson

Andreas Appelgren (born July 23, 1967) is a Swedish ice hockey coach. He is currently the head coach for Leksands IF of the Swedish Hockey League (SHL).

Appelgren joined the Leksands IF organization with the 2011–12 season as an assistant coach, and was promoted to head coach when he replaced Christer Olsson mid-season.
