= Leksands IF =

Swedish ice hockey club

- City: Leksand, Sweden
- League: HockeyAllsvenskan
- Founded: 13 August 1919
- Home arena: Tegera Arena (capacity: 7,650)
- Colours
- General manager: Thomas Johansson
- Head coach: Johan Hedberg
- Affiliates: Leksands IF Dam
- Website: leksandsif.se

Franchise history
- Championship wins: 4 (1969, 1973, 1974, 1975)
- Runners-up: 5 (1959, 1964, 1971, 1972, 1989)

Leksands Idrottsförening is a Swedish professional ice hockey team based in Leksand, Sweden. The team plays in the second highest tier league, HockeyAllsvenskan, after losing to HV71 in the playout and thus getting relegation. The club's home arena is Tegera Arena, which seats 7,650 spectators.

== History ==
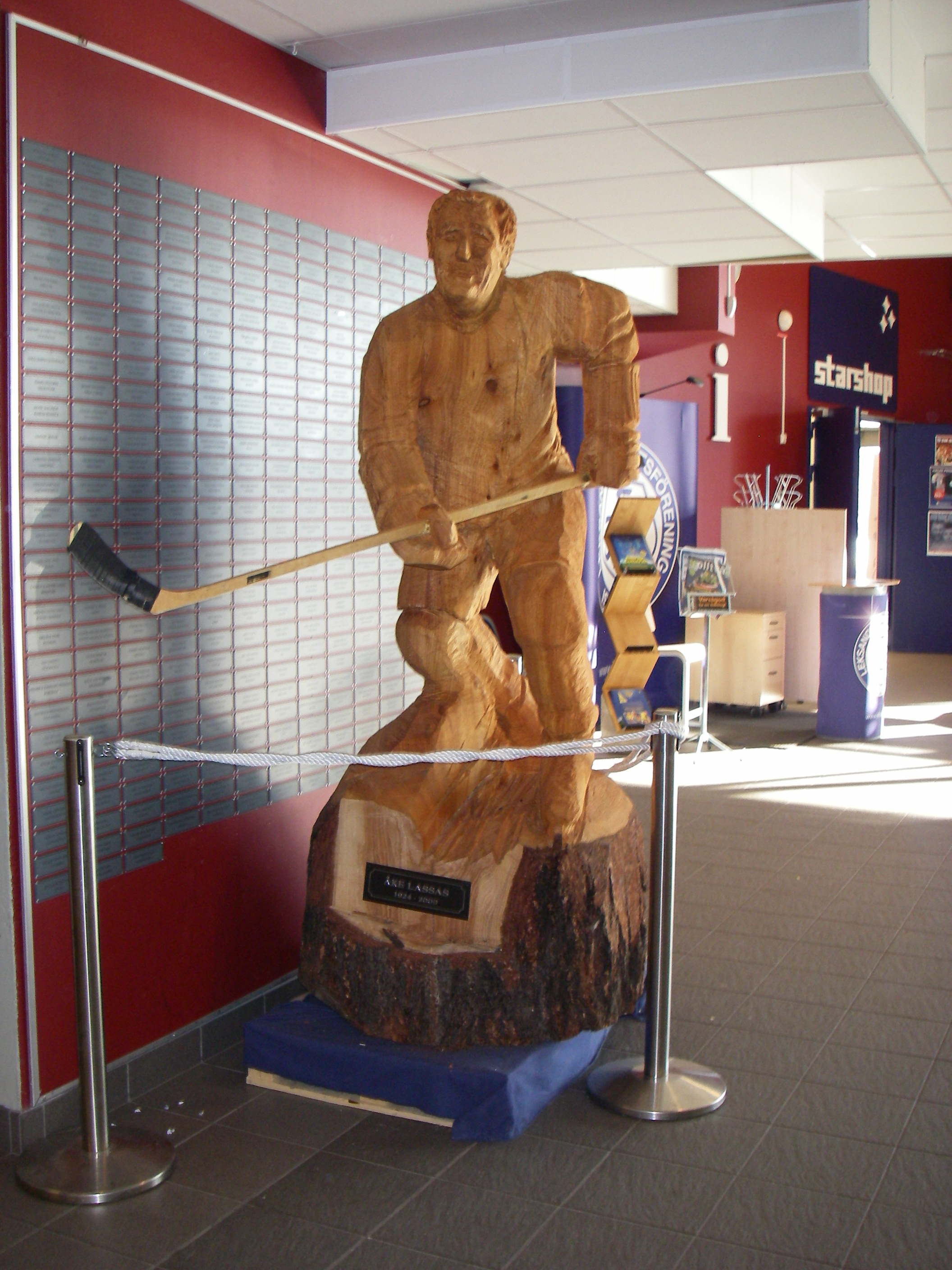
Åke Lassa´s statue in Tegera Arena.

The club was formed on 13 August 1919, originally playing bandy and ski competitions. In 1920, they also took up football.

The first hockey game was played in 1938, when they beat Mora IK 11–0, and this sport is now the only sport the club competes in. Despite the fact that the town of Leksand only has 6,000 inhabitants, Leksands IF is one of the most popular teams in Sweden, and the team averages over 4,000 spectators per game in their home arena despite playing in the second tier. Leksand played in the top hockey division in Sweden from 1951 until 2001. The club was very successful between 1969 and 1975, when they became Swedish champions four times (1969, 1973–1975). Before the current top division, Elitserien (now known as the SHL), was formed prior to the 1975–76 season, they had been the runners-up four times: 1959, 1964, 1971 and 1972. Leksand has never become SHL champions despite winning the SHL's regular season in 1980, 1994 and 1997, and being the runners-up in 1989. In 2001, they were the club with the second most consecutive seasons in the highest division at that point (the record is held by Södertälje SK, with 53 consecutive seasons between 1925 and 1978).

Following the relegation to HockeyAllsvenskan in April 2001, Leksand commuted between the top and second divisions until 2005–06, when the team was relegated to the second tier again, where they would find themselves until the 2012–13 season.

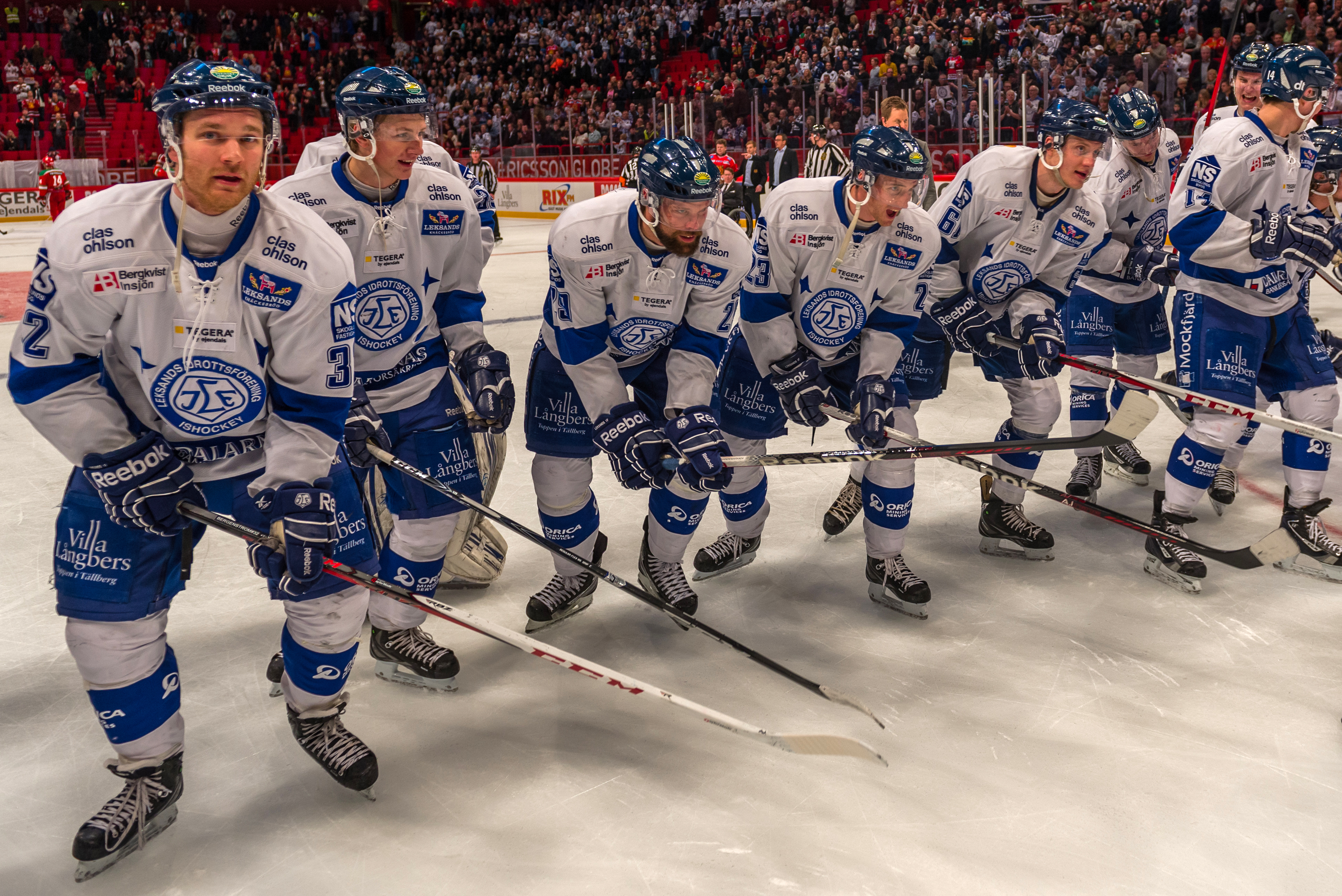
Leksand players celebrating a victory against arch rivals Mora IK in 2013.

For the 2007–08 season, Leksand signed former NHL goaltender Ed Belfour in an attempt to regain top league status. After winning the second league with relative ease, the team failed in the final qualification stage, Kvalserien, to gain promotion. Ed Belfour retired after the 2007–08 season.

Leksand once again won Allsvenskan in the 2008–09 season, but once again failed to qualify for the Elitserien in the 2009 Kvalserien. The managers Thomas Kempe and Thomas Jonsson were sacked following three straight defeats in the beginning of the Kvalserien. The team finished the 2009 Kvalserien with five wins in the last six games, but still failed to qualify. For the 2009–10 season, Leksand employed Leif Strömberg, who had previously successfully guided Södertälje SK through Kvalserien. The team once again won Allsvenskan and qualified for the 2010 Kvalserien, finishing three points ahead of AIK. In the ninth round of the 2010 Kvalserien, Leksand had a good chance to put them in the driver's seat for promotion to Elitserien, but Leksand failed to beat the Kvalserien's worst ranked team Växjö Lakers and, despite a win in the tenth and final round, Leksand missed Elitserien as both AIK and Rögle BK won their respective games in the final round.

After failing promotion, Leif Strömberg was replaced by ex-Leksand forward Niklas Eriksson, under whom the following season Leksand attempted to reach the Kvalserien for the seventh consecutive season. The team finished fourth in Allsvenskan and missed automatic qualification for the Kvalserien and had to play in a pre-qualification series to reach the Kvalserien, but Leksand finished third and missed the Kvalserien. Before the 2011/12 season, assistant head coach Christer Olsson took over the reins, but was sacked following a defeat at Sundsvall Hockey in late November and replaced by Andreas Appelgren.

After winning the regular season in the 2012–13 season, Leksand once again qualified for play in Kvalserien. In the 2013 Kvalserien, Leksand finally promoted back to the Swedish Hockey League (SHL; formerly Elitserien), the top-tier league, for the first time since the 2005–06 season.

== Season-by-season record ==
This is a partial list, featuring the five most recent completed seasons. For a more complete list, see List of Leksands IF seasons.

Year	Level	Division	Record		Avg. home atnd.	Notes	Ref.
Year	Level	Division	Position	W-OTW-OTL-L	Avg. home atnd.	Notes	Ref.
2020–21	Tier 1	SHL	3rd	25–7–5–15	22		
2020–21	Tier 1	Swedish Championship playoffs	—	0–0–1–3	16	Lost in 1st round 0–4 in games vs Örebro HK	
2021–22	Tier 1	SHL	8th	20–4–7–21	5,270		
2021–22	Tier 1	Eighth-finals	—	1–0–0–2	6,154	Lost 1–2 in games vs IK Oskarshamn	
2022–23	Tier 1	SHL	8th	22–5–1–24	6,065		
2022–23	Tier 1	Eighth-finals	—	0–1–0–2	5,508	Lost 1–2 in games vs Rögle BK	
2023–24	Tier 1	SHL	5th	27–3–5–17	6,485		
2023–24	Tier 1	Swedish Championship playoffs	—	2–1–2–2	7,650	Lost in 1st round 3–4 in games vs Frölunda HC	
2024–25	Tier 1	SHL	11th	19–3–8–22	6,556		

== Players and personnel ==
=== Current roster ===
No.	Nat	Player	Pos	S/G	Age	Acquired	Birthplace
17	(Sweden)	Dennis Altörn	LW	L	21	2024	Västerås, Sweden
8	(United States)	Matthew Caito	D	R	33	2020	Coto de Caza, California, United States
34	(Slovakia)	Peter Cehlárik	LW	L	31	2023	Žilina, Slovakia
25	(Sweden)	Robin Christoffersson	G	L	29	2025	Leksand, Sweden
24	(Sweden)	Arvid Eljas	C	L	23	2020	Björbo, Sweden
9	(Canada)	Gabriel Fortier	LW	L	26	2025	Lachine, Quebec, Canada
1	(Sweden)	Marcus Gidlöf	G	L	20	2023	Falun, Sweden
37	(Sweden)	Jakob Hellsten	G	L	26	2024	Ljusdal, Sweden
28	(Sweden)	Victor Johansson	D	L	20	2024	Linköping, Sweden
5	(Switzerland)	Andro Kaderli	RW	R	21	2024	Biel-Bienne, Switzerland
7	(Sweden)	Marcus Karlberg	LW	R	26	2017	Leksand, Sweden
13	(Sweden)	Jon Knuts	LW	L	35	2014	Malung, Sweden
14	(Sweden)	Oskar Lang	LW	L	29	2014	Arvika, Sweden
29	(Sweden)	Michael Lindqvist	RW	R	31	2025	Danderyd, Sweden
6	(Sweden)	Alexander Lundqvist	D	L	25	2021	Skellefteå, Sweden
21	(Finland)	Joonas Lyytinen	D	L	31	2024	Espoo, Finland
36	(Sweden)	Stefan Milosevic	D	L	22	2025	Ystad, Sweden
3	(Sweden)	Fred Nilsson	D	R	23	2023	Bollnäs, Sweden
12	(Sweden)	Kalle Östman	C	L	32	2022	Borlänge, Sweden
20	(United States)	Nolan Stevens	C	L	30	2025	Brantford, Ontario, Canada
33	(Sweden)	Olle Strandell	D	L	26	2025	Leksand, Sweden
15	(Canada)	Max Véronneau	RW	R	30	2023	Sandy Hill, Ontario, Canada

As of 24 July 2025.

=== Retired numbers ===
- 2 Åke Lassas
- 18 Jonas Bergqvist

=== Honored numbers ===
- 1 Christer Abrahamsson
- 2 Tomas Jonsson
- 3 Vilgot Larsson
- 6 Thommy Abrahamsson
- 8 Magnus Svensson
- 12 Mats Åhlberg
- 15 Dan Söderström
- 16 Niklas Eriksson
- 22 Nisse Nilsson

=== Honored coaches ===
- Rune Mases

=== Hockey Hall of Famers ===
- Ed Belfour – Class of 2011

== Rivalries ==
Leksands IF are Rivals with Mora IK.

Preceded by Brynäs IF	Swedish ice hockey champions 1969	Succeeded by Brynäs IF
Preceded by Brynäs IF	Swedish ice hockey champions 1973, 1974, 1975	Succeeded by Brynäs IF
