= IF Tunabro =

Swedish football club

- Full name: Idrottsföreningen Tunabro
- Founded: 1960
- Ground: Gyllevallen; Borlänge; Sweden
- League: Division 4 Dalarna
Home colours

IF Tunabro is a Swedish football club located in Borlänge.

== Background ==
IF Tunabro currently plays in Division 4 Dalarna which is the sixth tier of Swedish football. They play their home matches at the Gyllevallen in Borlänge.

The club is affiliated to Dalarnas Fotbollförbund. IF Tunabro have competed in the Svenska Cupen on 4 occasions and have played 4 matches in the competition.

== Season to season ==
Season	Level	Division	Section	Position	Movements
1999	Tier 6	Division 5	Dalarna Södra	2nd	
2000	Tier 6	Division 5	Dalarna Södra	2nd	
2001	Tier 6	Division 5	Dalarna Södra	2nd	Promotion Playoffs – Promoted
2002	Tier 5	Division 4	Dalarna	6th	
2003	Tier 5	Division 4	Dalarna	4th	
2004	Tier 5	Division 4	Dalarna	4th	
2005	Tier 5	Division 4	Dalarna	6th	
2006*	Tier 6	Division 4	Dalarna	4th	
2007	Tier 6	Division 4	Dalarna	2nd	Promotion Playoffs – Promoted
2008	Tier 5	Division 3	Södra Norrland	7th	
2009	Tier 5	Division 3	Södra Norrland	10th	Relegated
2010	Tier 6	Division 4	Dalarna	6th	
2011	Tier 6	Division 4	Dalarna	6th	

* League restructuring in 2006 resulted in a new division being created at Tier 3 and subsequent divisions dropping a level.
