= 1971–72 Swedish Division I season =

Swedish ice hockey season

The 1971–72 Swedish Division I season was the 28th season of Swedish Division I. Brynas IF won the league title by finishing first in the final round.

== First round ==
=== Northern Group ===
	Team	GP	W	T	L	+/-	P
1	Brynäs IF	14	13	1	0	69–30	27
2	Djurgårdens IF	14	9	2	3	71–45	20
3	Timrå IK	14	8	3	3	69–41	19
4	Södertälje SK	14	7	3	4	65–42	17
5	IF Björklöven	14	5	2	7	62–56	12
6	MoDo AIK	14	6	0	8	53–52	12
7	IF Tunabro	14	1	1	12	32–89	3
8	Nacka SK	14	1	0	13	40–106	2

=== Southern Group ===
	Team	GP	W	T	L	+/-	P
1	Västra Frölunda IF	14	11	0	3	77–34	22
2	Färjestads BK	14	9	3	2	80–38	21
3	Leksands IF	14	8	4	2	68–41	20
4	AIK	14	8	4	2	49–28	20
5	Tingsryds AIF	14	6	0	8	67–63	12
6	KB Karlskoga	14	4	0	10	45–78	8
7	Mora IK	14	2	3	9	49–69	7
8	Surahammars IF	14	0	2	12	39–122	2

== Qualification round ==
=== Northern Group ===
	Team	GP	W	T	L	+/-	P
1	IF Tunabro	6	4	1	1	33–17	9
2	IF Björklöven	6	4	1	1	27–16	9
3	MoDo AIK	6	3	0	3	21–21	5
4	Nacka SK	6	0	1	5	18–39	1

=== Southern Group ===
	Team	GP	W	T	L	+/-	P
1	KB Karlskoga	6	5	0	1	36–21	10
2	Tingsryds AIF	6	4	0	2	37–22	8
3	Mora IK	6	3	0	3	26–26	6
4	Surahammars IF	6	0	0	6	17–47	0

== Final round ==
	Team	GP	W	T	L	+/-	P
1	Brynäs IF	14	11	2	1	66–29	24
2	Leksands IF	14	9	1	4	66–45	19
3	Timrå IK	14	7	2	5	51–51	16
4	Södertälje SK	14	6	3	5	57–47	15
5	Djurgårdens IF	14	5	3	6	35–36	11
6	Västra Frölunda IF	14	5	0	9	55–50	10
7	Färjestads BK	14	3	2	9	42–63	8
8	AIK	14	3	1	10	33–64	7
