= 1976–77 Elitserien season =

- League: Elitserien
- Sport: Ice hockey
- Duration: 10 October 1976 – 10 March 1977

Regular season
- League champion: Brynäs IF

Playoffs
- Finals champions: Brynäs IF
- Runners-up: Färjestads BK

SHL seasons
- 1975–76 1977–78

The 1976–77 Elitserien season was the second season of the Elitserien, the top level of ice hockey in Sweden. 10 teams participated in the league, and Brynäs IF won the Swedish championship.

== Standings ==
Teams 1–4 qualify for 1977 Swedish championship playoffs
Teams 9–10 relegated to Division 1 for 1977–78

	Club	GP	W	T	L	GF	GA	Pts
1.	Brynäs IF	36	25	5	6	206	110	55
2.	Färjestads BK	36	24	4	8	181	122	52
3.	Leksands IF	36	22	4	10	198	150	48
4.	Modo AIK	36	19	3	14	155	140	41
5.	AIK	36	17	4	15	147	126	38
6.	Skellefteå AIK	36	14	7	15	137	146	35
7	Södertälje SK	36	12	7	17	141	173	31
8.	Västra Frölunda IF	36	12	5	19	150	174	29
9.	Örebro IK	36	7	2	27	126	205	16
10.	IF Björklöven	36	6	3	27	106	201	15

== Playoffs ==
Semifinals
1	Brynäs IF	2
4	MoDo AIK	0
2	Färjestads BK	2
3	Leksands IF	1

Finals
1	Brynäs IF	2
2	Färjestads BK	0
Third place
3	Leksands IF	2
4	MoDo AIK	0

=== Semifinals ===
==== Brynäs IF vs MoDo AIK ====
Brynäs win 2–0 in games.

17 March 1977	Brynäs IF	4 – 2 (1–1, 2–0, 1–1)	MoDo AIK	Attendance: 5,802

20 March 1977	MoDo AIK	4 – 5 OT (3–1, 0–2, 1–1, 0–1)	Brynäs IF	Attendance: 5,144

==== Färjestads BK vs Leksands IF ====
Färjestad wins 2–1 in games following neutral site tiebreaker at Gothenburg's Scandinavium.

17 March 1977	Färjestads BK	4 – 3 (2–2, 1–1, 1–0)	Leksands IF	Attendance: 5,134

20 March 1977	Leksands IF	5 – 4 OT (3–1, 0–2, 1–1, 0–1)	Färjestads BK	Attendance: 5,144

22 March 1977	Färjestads BK	3 – 2 (1–1, 1–1, 1–0)	Leksands IF	Scandinavium, Gothenburg; Neutral site Attendance: 11,350

=== Third place series ===
Leksands IF wins 2–0 in games.

25 March 1977	Leksands IF	7 – 4 (1–1, 4–2, 2–1)	MoDo AIK	Attendance: 1,492

27 March 1977	MoDo AIK	5 – 6 (3–2, 2–1, 0–2)	Leksands IF	Attendance: 2,046

=== Finals ===
Brynäs IF wins 2–0 in games and are crowned 1977 Swedish champions in ice hockey (9th title).

24 March 1977	Färjestads BK	2 – 6 (1–3, 1–2, 0–1)	Brynäs IF	Scandinavium, Gothenburg; Neutral site Attendance: 6,978

27 March 1977	Brynäs IF	9 – 3 (1–2, 3–1, 5–0)	Färjestads BK	Attendance: 6,311
