= 1973–74 Swedish Division I season =

Swedish ice hockey season

The 1973–74 Swedish Division I season was the 30th season of Swedish Division I. Leksands IF won the league title by finishing first in the final round.

== First round ==
=== Northern Group ===
	Team	GP	W	T	L	+/-	P
1	Brynäs IF	14	10	1	3	91–39	29
2	Timrå IK	14	10	0	4	80–42	20
3	Södertälje SK	14	8	2	4	68–48	18
4	IF Björklöven	14	9	0	5	53–48	18
5	Djurgårdens IF	14	7	0	7	62–56	14
6	MoDo AIK	14	6	2	6	63–61	14
7	IF Tunabro	14	2	1	11	33–96	5
8	Kiruna AIF	14	0	2	12	34–94	2

=== Southern Group ===
	Team	GP	W	T	L	+/-	P
1	Leksands IF	14	14	0	0	86–26	28
2	Västra Frölunda IF	14	9	1	4	66–36	19
3	AIK	14	8	2	4	68–52	18
4	Färjestads BK	14	7	3	4	73–38	17
5	Västerås IK	14	7	0	7	50–59	14
6	Tingsryds AIF	14	4	1	9	44–73	9
7	Mora IK	14	2	1	11	36–52	5
8	Örebro IK	14	1	0	13	26–113	2

== Qualification round ==
	Team	GP	W	T	L	+/-	P
1	Djurgårdens IF	14	11	1	2	78–57	23
2	MoDo AIK	14	9	3	2	91–41	21
3	Mora IK	14	10	0	4	59–52	20
4	Tingsryds AIF	14	7	0	7	64–67	14
5	Västerås IK	14	5	2	7	69–58	12
6	Örebro IK	14	5	1	8	42–67	11
7	IF Tunabro	14	3	1	10	51–75	7
8	Kiruna AIF	14	2	0	12	49–96	4

== Final round ==
	Team	GP	W	T	L	+/-	P
1	Leksands IF	21	14	4	3	108–66	32
2	Timrå IK	21	12	2	7	90–92	26
3	Södertälje SK	21	11	2	8	102–78	24
4	Färjestads BK	21	9	3	9	80–79	21
5	Brynäs IF	21	9	2	10	98–86	20
6	AIK	21	8	3	10	90–109	19
7	Västra Frölunda IF	21	6	4	11	72–80	16
8	IF Björklöven	21	4	2	15	70–120	10
