= 1972–73 Swedish Division I season =

Swedish ice hockey season

The 1972–73 Swedish Division I season was the 29th season of Swedish Division I. Leksands IF won the league title by finishing first in the final round.

== First round ==
=== Northern Group ===
	Team	GP	W	T	L	+/-	P
1	Brynäs IF	14	13	0	1	94–28	26
2	Södertälje SK	14	11	0	3	68–45	22
3	Djurgårdens IF	14	7	2	5	68–52	16
4	Timrå IK	14	5	3	6	54–51	13
5	Skellefteå AIK	14	5	2	7	58–67	12
6	MoDO AIK	14	4	2	8	51–68	10
7	IF Björklöven	14	4	1	9	48–78	9
8	IF Tunabro	14	2	0	12	40–89	5

=== Southern Group ===
	Team	GP	W	T	L	+/-	P
1	Färjestads BK	14	11	1	2	91–37	23
2	Leksands IF	14	11	1	2	85–32	23
3	AIK	14	8	4	2	63–48	20
4	Västra Frölunda IF	14	5	3	6	49–47	13
5	KB Karlskoga	14	4	2	8	46–41	10
6	Västerås IK	14	4	2	8	42–72	10
7	Tingsryds AIF	14	4	2	8	48–80	10
8	Mora IK	14	1	1	12	39–76	2

== Qualification round ==
=== Northern Group ===
	Team	GP	W	T	L	+/-	P
1	IF Björklöven	6	4	0	2	28–27	8
2	IF Tunabro	6	3	0	3	26–21	6
3	MoDo AIK	6	3	0	3	21–21	6
4	Skellefteå AIK	6	2	0	4	25–27	2

=== Southern Group ===
	Team	GP	W	T	L	+/-	P
1	Tingsryds AIF	6	4	0	2	24–21	8
2	Västerås IK	6	3	1	2	21–15	7
3	Mora IK	6	3	1	2	24–23	7
4	KB Karlskoga	6	1	0	5	26–36	2

== Final round ==
	Team	GP	W	T	L	+/-	P
1	Leksands IF	14	9	2	3	76–48	20
2	Södertälje SK	14	9	2	3	58–43	20
3	Västra Frölunda IF	14	6	5	3	53–45	17
4	Brynäs IF	14	6	2	6	48–38	14
5	Färjestads BK	14	5	4	5	51–49	14
6	AIK	14	4	1	9	58–72	9
7	Djurgårdens IF	14	4	1	9	50–72	9
8	Timrå IK	14	3	3	8	40–67	9
