= 1974–75 Swedish Division I season =

Swedish ice hockey season

The 1974–75 Swedish Division I season was the 31st and final season of Swedish Division I. It was replaced by the Elitserien for 1975–76. Leksands IF won the final Division I title by defeating Brynas IF in the final.

== Regular season ==
	Team	GP	W	T	L	+/-	P
1	Brynäs IF	30	25	2	3	170–89	52
2	Leksands IF	30	25	1	4	196–101	51
3	Skellefteå AIK	30	17	8	5	119–96	42
4	Timrå IK	30	18	5	7	156–95	41
5	MoDo AIK	30	18	1	11	175–122	37
6	Färjestads BK	30	17	3	10	134–109	37
7	Västra Frölunda IF	30	16	3	11	134–118	35
8	AIK	30	16	2	12	139–118	34
9	Södertälje SK	30	15	3	12	143–118	33
10	Djurgårdens IF	30	15	3	12	134–145	33
11	IF Björklöven	30	9	4	17	109–152	22
12	Mora IK	30	8	4	18	114–143	20
13	Örebro IK	30	6	1	23	95–167	13
14	Tingsryds AIF	30	4	4	22	99–170	12
15	VIK Västerås HK	30	5	2	23	83–163	12
16	KB Karlskoga	30	2	2	26	94–188	6

== Playoffs ==
=== Semifinals ===
- Leksands IF – Skellefteå AIK 4–2, 3–2
- Brynäs IF – Timrå IK 4–2, 1–6, 4–1

=== 3rd place ===
- Timrå IK – Skellefteå AIK 3–2, 2–6, 7–5

=== Final ===
- Leksands IF – Brynäs IF 3–2, 6–7, 3–2 OT
