= 1976 Canada Cup rosters =

Below are the ice hockey national team rosters of the 1976 Canada Cup.

== Canada ==
Head coach: Scotty Bowman

Assistant coaches: Don Cherry, Bobby Kromm, Al MacNeil

No.	Pos.	Name	Height	Weight	Birthdate	1976-77 Team
31	G	Gerry Cheevers	5 ft 11 in (180 cm)	181 lb (82 kg)	December 7, 1940 (aged 35)	(United States) Boston Bruins
1	G	Chico Resch	5 ft 9 in (175 cm)	165 lb (75 kg)	July 10, 1948 (aged 28)	(United States) New York Islanders
30	G	Rogie Vachon	5 ft 8 in (173 cm)	161 lb (73 kg)	September 8, 1945 (aged 31)	(United States) Los Angeles Kings
5	D	Guy Lapointe	6 ft 0 in (183 cm)	185 lb (84 kg)	March 18, 1948 (aged 28)	(Canada) Montreal Canadiens
4	D	Bobby Orr	6 ft 0 in (183 cm)	198 lb (90 kg)	March 20, 1948 (aged 28)	(United States) Chicago Black Hawks
6	D	Denis Potvin (A)	6 ft 0 in (183 cm)	205 lb (93 kg)	October 29, 1953 (aged 22)	(United States) New York Islanders
23	D	Larry Robinson	6 ft 4 in (193 cm)	220 lb (100 kg)	June 2, 1951 (aged 25)	(Canada) Montreal Canadiens
18	D	Serge Savard	6 ft 3 in (191 cm)	209 lb (95 kg)	January 22, 1946 (aged 30)	(Canada) Montreal Canadiens
2	D	Carol Vadnais	6 ft 1 in (185 cm)	185 lb (84 kg)	September 25, 1945 (aged 30)	(United States) New York Rangers
21	D	Jimmy Watson	6 ft 0 in (183 cm)	190 lb (86 kg)	August 19, 1952 (aged 24)	(United States) Philadelphia Flyers
17	F	Bill Barber	6 ft 0 in (183 cm)	194 lb (88 kg)	July 11, 1952 (aged 24)	(United States) Philadelphia Flyers
16	F	Bobby Clarke (C)	5 ft 10 in (178 cm)	176 lb (80 kg)	August 13, 1949 (aged 27)	(United States) Philadelphia Flyers
15	F	Marcel Dionne	5 ft 8 in (173 cm)	185 lb (84 kg)	August 3, 1951 (aged 25)	(United States) Los Angeles Kings
7	F	Phil Esposito	6 ft 1 in (185 cm)	205 lb (93 kg)	February 20, 1942 (aged 34)	(United States) New York Rangers
34	F	Bob Gainey	6 ft 2 in (188 cm)	190 lb (86 kg)	December 13, 1953 (aged 22)	(Canada) Montreal Canadiens
26	F	Danny Gare	5 ft 9 in (175 cm)	176 lb (80 kg)	May 14, 1954 (aged 22)	(United States) Buffalo Sabres
9	F	Bobby Hull	5 ft 10 in (178 cm)	207 lb (94 kg)	January 3, 1939 (aged 37)	(Canada) Winnipeg Jets
10	F	Guy Lafleur	6 ft 0 in (183 cm)	194 lb (88 kg)	September 20, 1951 (aged 24)	(Canada) Montreal Canadiens
28	F	Reggie Leach	6 ft 0 in (183 cm)	181 lb (82 kg)	August 23, 1950 (aged 26)	(United States) Philadelphia Flyers
20	F	Pete Mahovlich	6 ft 5 in (196 cm)	205 lb (93 kg)	October 10, 1946 (aged 29)	(Canada) Montreal Canadiens
8	F	Rick Martin	5 ft 11 in (180 cm)	181 lb (82 kg)	July 26, 1951 (aged 25)	(United States) Buffalo Sabres
12	F	Lanny McDonald	6 ft 0 in (183 cm)	196 lb (89 kg)	February 16, 1953 (aged 23)	(Canada) Toronto Maple Leafs
11	F	Gilbert Perreault	6 ft 1 in (185 cm)	185 lb (84 kg)	November 13, 1950 (aged 25)	(United States) Buffalo Sabres
22	F	Steve Shutt	5 ft 11 in (180 cm)	181 lb (82 kg)	July 1, 1952 (aged 24)	(Canada) Montreal Canadiens
27	F	Darryl Sittler	6 ft 0 in (183 cm)	190 lb (86 kg)	September 18, 1950 (aged 25)	(Canada) Toronto Maple Leafs

== Czechoslovakia ==
Head coach: Karel Gut

Assistant coach: Ján Starší

No.	Pos.	Name	Height	Weight	Birthdate	1976-77 Team
1	G	Vladimír Dzurilla	5 ft 10 in (178 cm)	205 lb (93 kg)	August 2, 1942 (aged 34)	(Czechoslovakia) TJ Brno
2	G	Jiří Holeček	5 ft 11 in (180 cm)	163 lb (74 kg)	March 18, 1944 (aged 32)	(Czechoslovakia) TJ Sparta Praha
3	G	Pavol Svitana	-	-	September 2, 1948 (aged 28)	(Czechoslovakia) HC Košice
19	D	Jiří Bubla	5 ft 11 in (180 cm)	201 lb (91 kg)	January 27, 1950 (aged 26)	(Czechoslovakia) TJ Litvinov
5	D	Milan Chalupa	5 ft 10 in (178 cm)	185 lb (84 kg)	July 4, 1953 (aged 23)	(Czechoslovakia) ASD Dukla Jihlava
9	D	Miroslav Dvořák	5 ft 10 in (178 cm)	198 lb (90 kg)	October 11, 1951 (aged 24)	(Czechoslovakia) TJ Motor Česke Budějovice
15	D	František Kaberle	5 ft 11 in (180 cm)	196 lb (89 kg)	August 6, 1951 (aged 25)	(Czechoslovakia) TJ Kladno
17	D	Milan Kajkl	6 ft 0 in (183 cm)	194 lb (88 kg)	May 14, 1950 (aged 26)	(Czechoslovakia) TJ Plzeň
4	D	Oldřich Machač	5 ft 9 in (175 cm)	198 lb (90 kg)	April 18, 1946 (aged 30)	(Czechoslovakia) TJ Brno
7	D	František Pospíšil (C)	6 ft 0 in (183 cm)	185 lb (84 kg)	April 2, 1944 (aged 32)	(Czechoslovakia) TJ Kladno
8	D	Vladimír Šándrík	6 ft 1 in (185 cm)	196 lb (89 kg)	March 14, 1951 (aged 25)	(Czechoslovakia) HC Košice
16	F	Josef Augusta	5 ft 10 in (178 cm)	190 lb (86 kg)	November 24, 1946 (aged 29)	(Czechoslovakia) ASD Dukla Jihlava
14	F	František Černík	5 ft 10 in (178 cm)	190 lb (86 kg)	June 3, 1953 (aged 23)	(Czechoslovakia) ASD Dukla Jihlava
25	F	Bohuslav Ebermann	6 ft 0 in (183 cm)	183 lb (83 kg)	September 19, 1948 (aged 27)	(Czechoslovakia) TJ Plzeň
21	F	Ivan Hlinka	6 ft 0 in (183 cm)	183 lb (83 kg)	January 26, 1950 (aged 26)	(Czechoslovakia) TJ Litvinov
20	F	Jiří Holík (A)	5 ft 11 in (180 cm)	176 lb (80 kg)	July 9, 1944 (aged 32)	(Czechoslovakia) ASD Dukla Jihlava
24	F	Karel Holý	6 ft 0 in (183 cm)	179 lb (81 kg)	February 3, 1956 (aged 20)	(Czechoslovakia) TJ Sparta Praha
10	F	Vladimír Martinec	5 ft 8 in (173 cm)	185 lb (84 kg)	December 22, 1949 (aged 26)	(Czechoslovakia) TJ Pardubice
27	F	Eduard Novák	5 ft 11 in (180 cm)	190 lb (86 kg)	November 27, 1946 (aged 29)	(Czechoslovakia) TJ Kladno
11	F	Jiří Novák	5 ft 7 in (170 cm)	163 lb (74 kg)	June 6, 1950 (aged 26)	(Czechoslovakia) TJ Pardubice
6	F	Milan Nový	5 ft 10 in (178 cm)	196 lb (89 kg)	September 23, 1951 (aged 24)	(Czechoslovakia) TJ Kladno
23	F	Jaroslav Pouzar	6 ft 0 in (183 cm)	203 lb (92 kg)	January 23, 1952 (aged 24)	(Czechoslovakia) TJ Motor Česke Budějovice
22	F	Pavel Richter	5 ft 9 in (175 cm)	172 lb (78 kg)	December 5, 1954 (aged 21)	(Czechoslovakia) TJ Sparta Praha
12	F	Bohuslav Šťastný	5 ft 11 in (180 cm)	183 lb (83 kg)	April 23, 1949 (aged 27)	(Czechoslovakia) TJ Pardubice
18	F	Marián Šťastný	5 ft 10 in (178 cm)	194 lb (88 kg)	January 8, 1953 (aged 23)	(Czechoslovakia) HC Slovan Bratislava
26	F	Peter Šťastný	6 ft 1 in (185 cm)	201 lb (91 kg)	September 18, 1956 (aged 19)	(Czechoslovakia) HC Slovan Bratislava

== Finland ==
Head coaches: Lasse Heikkilä, Seppo Liitsola

No.	Pos.	Name	Height	Weight	Birthdate	1976-77 Team
18	G	Antti Leppänen	6 ft 0 in (183 cm)	214 lb (97 kg)	November 23, 1947 (aged 28)	(Finland) Tappara
1	G	Markus Mattsson	6 ft 0 in (183 cm)	183 lb (83 kg)	July 30, 1957 (aged 19)	(Finland) Ilves
19	G	Jorma Valtonen	5 ft 9 in (175 cm)	161 lb (73 kg)	December 22, 1946 (aged 29)	(Italy) Gherdëina
4	D	Tapio Flinck	6 ft 2 in (188 cm)	212 lb (96 kg)	August 15, 1950 (aged 26)	(Finland) Ässät
8	D	Tapio Levo	6 ft 1 in (185 cm)	192 lb (87 kg)	September 24, 1955 (aged 20)	(Finland) Ässät
10	D	Lasse Litma	6 ft 0 in (183 cm)	183 lb (83 kg)	April 5, 1954 (aged 22)	(Finland) Tappara
3	D	Timo Nummelin	5 ft 10 in (178 cm)	190 lb (86 kg)	September 7, 1948 (aged 28)	(Finland) TPS
27	D	Jouni Peltonen	6 ft 0 in (183 cm)	214 lb (97 kg)	January 21, 1955 (aged 21)	(Finland) Lukko
2	D	Pekka Rautakallio	6 ft 3 in (191 cm)	214 lb (97 kg)	July 25, 1953 (aged 23)	(United States) Phoenix Roadrunners
5	D	Heikki Riihiranta	5 ft 11 in (180 cm)	192 lb (87 kg)	October 4, 1948 (aged 27)	(Canada) Winnipeg Jets
9	D	Timo Saari	6 ft 2 in (188 cm)	181 lb (82 kg)	January 14, 1949 (aged 26)	(Finland) Jokerit
20	F	Matti Hagman	6 ft 0 in (183 cm)	183 lb (83 kg)	September 21, 1955 (aged 20)	(United States) Boston Bruins
23	F	Hannu Kapanen	5 ft 10 in (178 cm)	168 lb (76 kg)	March 13, 1951 (aged 25)	(Finland) Jokerit
13	F	Veli-Pekka Ketola (C)	6 ft 2 in (188 cm)	238 lb (108 kg)	March 28, 1948 (aged 28)	(Canada) Winnipeg Jets
26	F	Pertti Koivulahti	5 ft 9 in (175 cm)	161 lb (73 kg)	June 7, 1951 (aged 25)	(Finland) Tappara
14	F	Tapio Koskinen	5 ft 10 in (178 cm)	172 lb (78 kg)	January 22, 1953 (aged 23)	(Finland) Ässät
17	F	Harri Linnonmaa	5 ft 10 in (178 cm)	168 lb (76 kg)	July 30, 1946 (aged 30)	(Finland) HIFK
11	F	Kari Makkonen	6 ft 0 in (183 cm)	183 lb (83 kg)	January 20, 1955 (aged 21)	(Finland) Ässät
15	F	Lasse Oksanen	6 ft 0 in (183 cm)	181 lb (82 kg)	December 7, 1942 (aged 33)	(Italy) Gherdëina
12	F	Esa Peltonen	5 ft 10 in (178 cm)	176 lb (80 kg)	February 25, 1947 (aged 29)	(Finland) HIFK
24	F	Matti Rautiainen	5 ft 9 in (175 cm)	176 lb (80 kg)	October 7, 1955 (aged 20)	(Finland) KOOVEE
21	F	Seppo Repo	5 ft 10 in (178 cm)	181 lb (82 kg)	September 21, 1947 (aged 28)	(United States) Phoenix Roadrunners
25	F	Jouni Rinne	5 ft 10 in (178 cm)	185 lb (84 kg)	March 12, 1956 (aged 20)	(Finland) Lukko
16	F	Juhani Tamminen	5 ft 11 in (180 cm)	185 lb (84 kg)	May 26, 1950 (aged 26)	(United States) Phoenix Roadrunners
22	F	Jorma Vehmanen	5 ft 10 in (178 cm)	174 lb (79 kg)	September 18, 1945 (aged 30)	(Finland) Lukko

== Sweden ==
Head coach: Hans "Virus" Lindberg

Assistant coach: Kjell Larsson

No.	Pos.	Name	Height	Weight	Birthdate	1976-77 Team
2	G	Göran Högosta	6 ft 0 in (183 cm)	187 lb (85 kg)	April 15, 1954 (aged 22)	(Sweden) Leksands IF
1	G	William Löfqvist	5 ft 10 in (178 cm)	168 lb (76 kg)	April 12, 1947 (aged 29)	(Sweden) Brynäs IF
30	G	Hardy Åström	5 ft 11 in (180 cm)	176 lb (80 kg)	March 29, 1951 (aged 25)	(Sweden) Skellefteå AIK
3	D	Thommie Bergman	6 ft 3 in (191 cm)	201 lb (91 kg)	December 10, 1947 (aged 28)	(Canada) Winnipeg Jets
25	D	Lars-Erik Esbjörs	5 ft 11 in (180 cm)	183 lb (83 kg)	October 11, 1949 (aged 26)	(Sweden) Västra Fölunda IF
9	D	Björn Johansson	5 ft 11 in (180 cm)	154 lb (70 kg)	February 23, 1950 (aged 26)	(Sweden) Södertälje SK
5	D	Börje Salming	6 ft 1 in (185 cm)	209 lb (95 kg)	April 17, 1951 (aged 25)	(Canada) Toronto Maple Leafs
8	D	Stig Salming	5 ft 11 in (180 cm)	179 lb (81 kg)	October 15, 1947 (aged 28)	(Sweden) Brynäs IF
7	D	Lars-Erik Sjöberg	5 ft 8 in (173 cm)	165 lb (75 kg)	May 4, 1944 (aged 32)	(Canada) Winnipeg Jets
26	D	Jan-Olof Svensson	5 ft 10 in (178 cm)	174 lb (79 kg)	February 6, 1949 (aged 27)	(Sweden) Brynäs IF
6	D	Mats Waltin	5 ft 11 in (180 cm)	172 lb (78 kg)	October 7, 1953 (aged 22)	(Sweden) Södertälje SK
4	D	Stig Östling	5 ft 10 in (178 cm)	174 lb (79 kg)	December 31, 1948 (aged 27)	(Sweden) Brynäs IF
22	F	Per-Olov Brasar	5 ft 8 in (173 cm)	172 lb (78 kg)	September 30, 1950 (aged 25)	(Sweden) Leksands IF
14	F	Lars-Erik Ericsson	6 ft 1 in (185 cm)	179 lb (81 kg)	July 5, 1950 (aged 26)	(Sweden) Brynäs IF
12	F	Roland Eriksson	6 ft 2 in (188 cm)	181 lb (82 kg)	March 1, 1954 (aged 22)	(United States) Minnesota North Stars
19	F	Inge Hammarström	6 ft 0 in (183 cm)	174 lb (79 kg)	January 20, 1948 (aged 28)	(Canada) Toronto Maple Leafs
20	F	Anders Hedberg	5 ft 10 in (178 cm)	174 lb (79 kg)	February 25, 1951 (aged 25)	(Canada) Winnipeg Jets
21	F	Dan Labraaten	5 ft 9 in (175 cm)	168 lb (76 kg)	September 5, 1951 (aged 25)	(Canada) Winnipeg Jets
10	F	Willy Lindström	6 ft 1 in (185 cm)	170 lb (77 kg)	May 5, 1951 (aged 25)	(Canada) Winnipeg Jets
11	F	Tord Lundström	6 ft 1 in (185 cm)	179 lb (81 kg)	March 4, 1945 (aged 31)	(Sweden) Brynäs IF
15	F	Lars-Göran Nilsson	5 ft 10 in (178 cm)	165 lb (75 kg)	March 9, 1944 (aged 32)	(Sweden) Brynäs IF
17	F	Ulf Nilsson	5 ft 11 in (180 cm)	176 lb (80 kg)	May 11, 1950 (aged 26)	(Canada) Winnipeg Jets
27	F	Kjell-Arne Vikström	5 ft 11 in (180 cm)	179 lb (81 kg)	March 28, 1951 (aged 25)	(Sweden) Södertälje SK
18	F	Juha Widing	6 ft 1 in (185 cm)	190 lb (86 kg)	July 4, 1947 (aged 29)	(United States) Los Angeles Kings
16	F	Mats Åhlberg	5 ft 10 in (178 cm)	174 lb (79 kg)	May 16, 1947 (aged 29)	(Sweden) Leksands IF

== United States ==
Head coach: (Canada) Bob Pulford

Assistant coach: (Canada) Harry Neale

No.	Pos.	Name	Height	Weight	Birthdate	1976-77 Team
30	G	Mike Curran	5 ft 9 in (175 cm)	172 lb (78 kg)	April 14, 1944 (aged 32)	(United States) Minnesota Fighting Saints
1	G	Pete LoPresti	6 ft 1 in (185 cm)	201 lb (91 kg)	May 23, 1954 (aged 22)	(United States) Minnesota North Stars
35	G	Robert Raeder	6 ft 0 in (183 cm)	181 lb (82 kg)	October 8, 1953 (aged 22)	(United States) New England Whalers
3	D	Rick Chartraw	6 ft 0 in (183 cm)	205 lb (93 kg)	July 13, 1954 (aged 22)	(Canada) Montreal Canadiens
5	D	Mike Christie	6 ft 0 in (183 cm)	190 lb (86 kg)	December 20, 1949 (aged 26)	(United States) Cleveland Barons
20	D	Lee Fogolin	6 ft 0 in (183 cm)	201 lb (91 kg)	February 7, 1955 (aged 21)	(United States) Buffalo Sabres
29	D	Al Hangsleben	6 ft 1 in (185 cm)	194 lb (88 kg)	February 22, 1953 (aged 23)	(United States) New England Whalers
7	D	Mike Milbury	6 ft 1 in (185 cm)	205 lb (93 kg)	June 17, 1952 (aged 24)	(United States) Boston Bruins
23	D	Lou Nanne	6 ft 0 in (183 cm)	181 lb (82 kg)	June 2, 1941 (aged 35)	(United States) Minnesota North Stars
2	D	Bill Nyrop (C)	6 ft 2 in (188 cm)	205 lb (93 kg)	July 23, 1952 (aged 24)	(Canada) Montreal Canadiens
4	D	Gary Sargent	5 ft 10 in (178 cm)	201 lb (91 kg)	February 18, 1954 (aged 22)	(United States) Los Angeles Kings
34	F	Fred Ahern	6 ft 0 in (183 cm)	181 lb (82 kg)	February 12, 1952 (aged 24)	(United States) Cleveland Barons
14	F	Curt Bennett	6 ft 3 in (191 cm)	194 lb (88 kg)	March 27, 1948 (aged 28)	(United States) Atlanta Flames
17	F	Harvey Bennett	6 ft 4 in (193 cm)	216 lb (98 kg)	August 9, 1952 (aged 24)	(United States) Washington Capitals
21	F	Dan Bolduc	5 ft 9 in (175 cm)	190 lb (86 kg)	April 6, 1953 (aged 23)	(United States) New England Whalers
8	F	Robbie Ftorek	5 ft 10 in (178 cm)	154 lb (70 kg)	January 2, 1952 (aged 24)	(United States) Phoenix Roadrunners
12	F	Steve Jensen	6 ft 2 in (188 cm)	190 lb (86 kg)	April 14, 1955 (aged 21)	(United States) Minnesota North Stars
18	F	Joe Noris	6 ft 0 in (183 cm)	185 lb (84 kg)	October 26, 1951 (aged 24)	(United States) San Diego Mariners
9	F	Gerry O'Flaherty	5 ft 9 in (175 cm)	174 lb (79 kg)	August 31, 1950 (aged 26)	(Canada) Vancouver Canucks
32	F	Doug Palazzari	5 ft 5 in (165 cm)	170 lb (77 kg)	November 3, 1952 (aged 23)	(United States) Kansas City Blues (Note: Played 12 games with the St. Louis Blues, Kansas City's NHL affiliate)
19	F	Craig Patrick	6 ft 0 in (183 cm)	190 lb (86 kg)	May 20, 1946 (aged 30)	(United States) Minnesota Fighting Saints (Note: Finished 1976-77 season with the Washington Capitals)
33	F	Mike Polich	5 ft 8 in (173 cm)	170 lb (77 kg)	December 19, 1953 (aged 22)	(Canada) Nova Scotia Voyageurs (Note: Played five playoff games with the Montreal Canadiens, Nova Scotia's NHL affiliate)
15	F	Dean Talafous	6 ft 4 in (193 cm)	181 lb (82 kg)	August 25, 1953 (aged 23)	(United States) Minnesota North Stars
28	F	Butch Williams	5 ft 11 in (180 cm)	194 lb (88 kg)	September 11, 1952 (aged 24)	(Canada) Edmonton Oilers

== USSR ==
Head coach: Viktor Tikhonov

Assistant coach: Boris Mayorov, Robert Cherenkov

No.	Pos.	Name	Height	Weight	Birthdate	1976-77 Team
20	G	Vladislav Tretiak	6 ft 0 in (183 cm)	201 lb (91 kg)	April 25, 1952 (aged 24)	(Soviet Union) CSKA Moskva
25	G	Mihails Vasiļonoks	5 ft 11 in (180 cm)	181 lb (82 kg)	May 11, 1948 (aged 28)	(Soviet Union) Dinamo Riga
1	G	Viktor Zinger	5 ft 8 in (173 cm)	154 lb (70 kg)	October 29, 1941 (aged 34)	(Soviet Union) Spartak Moskva
4	D	Sergei Babinov	5 ft 11 in (180 cm)	183 lb (83 kg)	July 11, 1955 (aged 21)	(Soviet Union) Krylia Sovetov Moskva
5	D	Zinetula Bilyaletdinov	5 ft 11 in (180 cm)	190 lb (86 kg)	March 15, 1955 (aged 21)	(Soviet Union) Dynamo Moskva
27	D	Yuri Fyodorov	6 ft 0 in (183 cm)	185 lb (84 kg)	July 8, 1949 (aged 27)	(Soviet Union) Torpedo Gorky
2	D	Alexander Gusev	6 ft 0 in (183 cm)	198 lb (90 kg)	January 21, 1947 (aged 29)	(Soviet Union) CSKA Moskva
26	D	Vladimir Krikunov	5 ft 9 in (175 cm)	174 lb (79 kg)	March 20, 1950 (aged 26)	(Soviet Union) Dinamo Riga
15	D	Alexander Kulikov	5 ft 10 in (178 cm)	190 lb (86 kg)	April 20, 1951 (aged 25)	(Soviet Union) Spartak Moskva
3	D	Vladimir Lutchenko	6 ft 1 in (185 cm)	203 lb (92 kg)	January 2, 1949 (aged 27)	(Soviet Union) CSKA Moskva
6	D	Valeri Vasiliev	6 ft 0 in (183 cm)	190 lb (86 kg)	August 3, 1949 (aged 27)	(Soviet Union) Dynamo Moskva
11	F	Boris Alexandrov	5 ft 9 in (175 cm)	181 lb (82 kg)	November 13, 1955 (aged 20)	(Soviet Union) CSKA Moskva
14	F	Vyacheslav Anisin	5 ft 8 in (173 cm)	168 lb (76 kg)	July 11, 1951 (aged 25)	(Soviet Union) CSKA Moskva
19	F	Helmuts Balderis	5 ft 11 in (180 cm)	190 lb (86 kg)	June 30, 1952 (aged 24)	(Soviet Union) Dinamo Riga
23	F	Valeri Belousov	5 ft 9 in (175 cm)	176 lb (80 kg)	December 17, 1948 (aged 27)	(Soviet Union) Traktor Chelyabinsk
13	F	Alexander Golikov	5 ft 11 in (180 cm)	172 lb (78 kg)	November 26, 1952 (aged 23)	(Soviet Union) Dynamo Moskva
28	F	Vladimir Golikov	6 ft 1 in (185 cm)	185 lb (84 kg)	June 10, 1954 (aged 22)	(Soviet Union) Khimik Voskresensk
8	F	Sergei Kapustin	5 ft 11 in (180 cm)	192 lb (87 kg)	February 13, 1953 (aged 23)	(Soviet Union) Krylia Sovetov Moskva
12	F	Vladimir Kovin	6 ft 0 in (183 cm)	198 lb (90 kg)	June 20, 1954 (aged 22)	(Soviet Union) Torpedo Gorky
21	F	Yuri Lebedev	5 ft 10 in (178 cm)	174 lb (79 kg)	March 1, 1951 (aged 25)	(Soviet Union) Krylia Sovetov Moskva
10	F	Alexander Maltsev (C)	5 ft 9 in (175 cm)	170 lb (77 kg)	April 20, 1949 (aged 27)	(Soviet Union) Dynamo Moskva
24	F	Vladimir Repnyov	5 ft 10 in (178 cm)	174 lb (79 kg)	January 9, 1949 (aged 27)	(Soviet Union) Krylia Sovetov Moskva
9	F	Viktor Shalimov	5 ft 10 in (178 cm)	176 lb (80 kg)	April 20, 1951 (aged 25)	(Soviet Union) Spartak Moskva
17	F	Alexander Skvortsov	5 ft 7 in (170 cm)	190 lb (86 kg)	August 28, 1954 (aged 22)	(Soviet Union) Torpedo Gorky
18	F	Vladimir Vikulov	5 ft 9 in (175 cm)	172 lb (78 kg)	July 20, 1946 (aged 30)	(Soviet Union) CSKA Moskva
22	F	Viktor Zhluktov	6 ft 2 in (188 cm)	209 lb (95 kg)	January 26, 1954 (aged 22)	(Soviet Union) CSKA Moskva

== Sources ==
- "Coupe Canada 1976 Canada Cup" Official Match Program, Controlled Media Corp.,1976
