= 1976 Canada Cup =

Canada Cup ice hockey tournament

Tournament details
- Host countries: Canada; United States
- Venues: 6 (in 6 host cities)
- Dates: September 2–15, 1976
- Teams: 6

Final positions
- Champions: Canada (1st title)

Tournament statistics
- Games played: 17
- Goals scored: 125 (7.35 per game)
- Attendance: 244,970 (14,410 per game)
- Scoring leader: (Soviet Union) Viktor Zhluktov (9 pts)

Awards
- MVP: (Canada) Bobby Orr

The 1976 Canada Cup was an international ice hockey tournament held September 2 to 15, 1976, in Ottawa, Toronto, Montreal, Winnipeg and Quebec City in Canada as well as in Philadelphia, in the United States. It was the first of five Canada Cup tournaments held between 1976 and 1991, organized by Alan Eagleson, and sanctioned by the International Ice Hockey Federation (IIHF), Hockey Canada and the National Hockey League (NHL).

The six-team, round robin tournament ended with a best-of-three final between the top two teams. Canada finished atop the standings and defeated Czechoslovakia in the final in two consecutive games. Bobby Orr was named the most valuable player of the tournament, and Viktor Zhluktov was the leading scorer.

The Canada Cup was the first true best-on-best world championship in hockey history as it allowed any player to represent their team regardless of amateur or professional status. The hockey was both exciting and entertaining, with one of the games being declared "best game of all time" by fans. Bobby Orr and Lanny MacDonald both claimed that winning the Canada Cup was more important to them than their Stanley Cup wins. Consequently, it marked the end of Canada's six-year boycott of the IIHF. The success of the event paved the way for greater use of professional players in the World Championship and Winter Olympics.

== Background ==
The Canadian Amateur Hockey Association (CAHA) had complained for years that Team Canada faced a competitive disadvantage in international tournaments as it was restricted from using its best players, who were professionals in the National Hockey League (NHL), while European teams masked the status of their best players. The issue came to a head in 1970 when International Ice Hockey Federation (IIHF) president Bunny Ahearne reneged on a promise to allow each team to use up to nine professional players at the 1970 World Championship. In response, the CAHA withdrew Canada from all international competition until the IIHF gave it the right to use its best players as the European teams could.

Around the same time, talks were begun to hold a friendly tournament between Canada's top players and the Soviet national team. These talks culminated in the Summit Series in 1972 that was narrowly claimed by Canada's NHL all-stars. A second Summit Series in 1974 saw the Soviets easily defeat the World Hockey Association's (WHA) top all-stars, but the two series created demand for a true best-on-best world championship. It was during the 1974 Summit Series that National Hockey League Players' Association (NHLPA) executive-director Alan Eagleson began negotiations with Soviet and European authorities to create such a tournament. The negotiations, which grew to include the IIHF and Hockey Canada and lasted over two years, resulted in numerous agreements: Canada would return to international competition in 1977, the World Championships moved to an open format that allowed professionals to play and club teams of the Soviet League would tour North America and face NHL teams in exhibition games in what became the Super Series. The key agreement was the creation of the Canada Cup, to be held in 1976.

Having gained international approval, Eagleson then convinced the NHLPA's players to support the tournament with promises of increased pension contributions resulting from their participation. The NHL's owners supported the concept after agreeing that half of the proceeds from the games would go to them. Some teams remained uneasy, however. The Philadelphia Flyers were afraid their players might suffer injuries in the tournament and vowed that no player from their roster would be permitted to play. They were convinced to back down on their threats after being promised two games would be played in Philadelphia with the Flyers receiving their share of the revenue. Though the tournament was held in September so as not to interfere with the NHL season, league president Clarence Campbell remained skeptical of the tournament's viability, calling it "wasteful".

== Teams ==
Six teams competed in the 1976 Canada Cup. Canada was favoured to win as they had brought what was argued to be the strongest team in the nation's history to the tournament – 18 of the 25 players on the roster would later be elected into the Hockey Hall of Fame. Seeking its best possible roster, the Canadian team put aside the bitter rivalry between the NHL and WHA, selecting players from both leagues, though almost entirely from the NHL. The WHA franchise Winnipeg Jets were well represented with Bobby Hull playing for Canada, Bobby Kromm assistant coach with Canada, Ulf Nilsson, Willy Lindstrom, Anders Hedberg and Lars-Erik Sjoberg represented team Sweden. Cleveland Crusaders defenseman Paul Shmyr participated in training camp only while Quebec Nordiques star Marc Tardif was named to the team but couldn't play due to the severe concussion he suffered in the 1976 WHA playoffs. Bobby Orr, plagued by growing knee problems nearly turned down the invitation to play before reconsidering, while goaltender Rogatien Vachon, who was not initially invited to join the team, wound up playing every minute in the Canadian goal.

While the fans hoped for a Canada–Soviet Union final, analysts ranked the Soviets as only the fourth best team entering the tournament. They chose to leave most of their elite players home for reasons that remain unclear. The potential of defections are one possibility. Officially, Soviet officials said many of their players were suffering from fatigue, though goaltender Vladislav Tretiak later claimed the omissions were the result of a power struggle between Olympic coach Boris Kulagin and Canada Cup team coach Viktor Tikhonov and that the former sought to undermine the latter by forcing him to coach a weaker team.

The Soviets downplayed the importance of the tournament, stating their true focus was the World Championships and the Winter Olympics. As a result, they sent a much younger, "experimental" team to Canada. Valeri Kharlamov, considered by many to be their best forward, also did not play in the series, as he was recovering from serious injuries suffered in a car accident.

The Czechoslovak team was predicted to face Canada in the final by most experts as they brought the same team that won the 1976 World Championship a few months prior. Their goaltender, Jiří Holeček, was considered the best in the world outside the NHL. Czechoslovak coach Karel Gut anticipated his team would emerge to show the world that there was "more to international hockey than Canada and the Soviet Union". Sweden was ranked third entering the tournament and had a large mixture of domestic and overseas players from the NHL and WHA. The United States and Finland rounded out the tournament and were not expected to be competitive.

== Round robin games ==
The tournament opened in Ottawa on September 2 as Finland faced a Canadian team focused on avoiding a sense of complacency following defeats against the Soviets in 1974 and 1975. Rick Martin scored a hat trick to lead Canada in a rout of the Finns, 11–2. Sweden then defeated the United States, 5–2, on the strength of four first period power play goals. Swedish star Börje Salming, who played in the NHL for the Toronto Maple Leafs, was greeted with a five-minute standing ovation by the Toronto crowd prior to the game.

The third game featured the world champion Czechoslovaks against the Olympic champion Soviets. Czechoslovakia justified pre-tournament expectations by winning 5–3 while the Soviets complained about the scheduling, claiming organizers deliberately matched them up against the Czechoslovaks in their opening game to set them at an early disadvantage in the tournament. The Soviet complaints grew louder following a 3–3 tie against Sweden. While the Swedish press was hailing Salming as the greatest player in their nation's history after his second consecutive dominant effort, the Soviets threatened to quit the tournament as they were upset about the officiating of Canadian referee Andre Legace. Organizers did not take the Soviet threats to quit the tournament seriously.

The Czechoslovaks remained dominant, defeating the Finns 8–0 in a game where they out-shot their opponent 49–15. Czechoslovak goaltender Holeček recorded the first shutout in the tournament's history. The Finns were similarly decimated by the Soviets, who did not withdraw from the tournament, by an 11–3 score. Meanwhile, the Americans, criticized in the media as being "team useless" over their perceived lack of talent, earned a measure of respect when they lost to Canada 4–2 in a game where the outcome was not certain until the final minute of play, then earned a 4–4 tie against the Czechoslovaks, and the respect of their coach, in a game played at Philadelphia.

A 4–0 loss to Canada followed by a shocking 8–6 defeat at the hands of their Scandinavian rival Finland eliminated Sweden from contention. The Finns, who overcame a 4–1 deficit, felt the result vindicated their placement in the tournament while the Swedes considered the result an embarrassment. The Soviets remained alive by defeating the United States 5–0 in Philadelphia while Canada faced the Czechoslovaks at the same time in Montreal. The game featured a goaltender battle between Canada's Rogatien Vachon and the Czechoslovak's Vladimír Dzurilla and was immediately claimed to be one of the greatest games of all time. Milan Nový scored with less than five minutes to play to lift the Czechoslovaks to a 1–0 victory and assured them a place in the final. The result meant that the winner of the Canada–Soviet Union game would claim the second spot in the final.

Three games marked the final day of the round robin on September 11. The United States overcame a 2–0 deficit to defeat Finland 6–3 to finish fifth in the tournament. American co-general manager Tommy Ivan expressed his pride in his team's tournament, and predicted that this tournament had set the stage for the United States to grow into a contender in hockey. The Swedes, meanwhile, earned a 2–1 victory over Czechoslovakia in a game that had no impact on the standings.

While fans expected Canada and the Soviet Union would meet in the final, ultimately, they squared off in an unofficial semi-final. The two teams played the game at a furious pace, trading goals in a first period from which Canada emerged with a 2–1 lead. Canada extended their lead in the second period, then relied on defenceman Bobby Orr's stellar play to hold off the Soviets and advance to the final. As they had earlier in the tournament, the Soviets complained of biased officiating playing a role in the outcome of the game.

== Final ==
The 1976 Canada Cup final was a best-of-three series. The first game was played September 13 at Maple Leaf Gardens in Toronto. The Czechoslovaks started Dzurilla in goal after his brilliant display against Canada in the round robin. Dzurilla was unable to duplicate his success as Gilbert Perreault opened the scoring one minute into the game en route to a four-goal onslaught by the Canadians in the first period. The Czechoslovaks were stronger in the final 40 minutes, but were unable to beat Canada's Vachon, who recorded his second shutout of the tournament in a 6–0 victory for Canada. During the game, the Czechoslovaks were angered when Canada's Steve Shutt crosschecked Jiří Novák from behind. Novak suffered a concussion and was unable to play the remainder of the series. Shutt, a skill player of smaller stature, was apologetic after the game, claiming he had not intended to hit his opponent in the fashion he did.

Game two was played in the Montreal Forum on September 15. Jiri Holeček, who replaced Dzurilla in goal after the first period of the first game, started game two for Czechoslovakia, while Vachon remained in the Canadian net. As they had in the first game, Canada jumped out to an early lead, scoring two goals in the first three minutes of play. Holeček was quickly pulled and replaced with Dzurilla, who completed the game. The Czechoslovaks replied with a second period goal and another early in the third to tie the game. Bobby Clarke re-established the Canadian lead midway through the period before Josef Augusta and Marián Šťastný scored goals one minute apart to give Czechoslovakia its first lead, 4–3, with four minutes remaining in the third period. Dzurilla was strong in net as the Canadians put 39 shots on goal in regulation time, but made a critical mistake with less than three minutes remaining. His attempt to clear a puck from his zone went instead to Canada's Bill Barber, who scored into an open net to tie the game and send it to overtime.

The teams played an intense overtime period filled with end-to-end rushes and brilliant saves by the goaltenders. At one point, Canada's Guy Lafleur put a shot on net that snuck through the Czechoslovak goaltender, but Ivan Hlinka deliberately shoved the net out of place before the puck crossed the line. He received a delay of game penalty, but prevented a Canadian win. A few moments later, Guy Lapointe rifled a low shot that again beat Dzurilla, however this goal was also disallowed as the buzzer had sounded to end the first ten-minutes of the overtime period one-tenth of a second before it crossed the line. International rules of the time dictated that play was to be stopped at the ten-minute mark of each overtime period and the teams would switch the side of the ice they defended. During the break, Canadian assistant coach Don Cherry noted to his team that Dzurilla often came far out of his net to defend and could be beaten on a shot from a sharp angle.

Less than two minutes into the second half of the overtime period, Darryl Sittler received a pass from Marcel Dionne as he skated into the Czechoslovak zone close to the side boards. As Dzurilla came out to challenge, Sittler faked a shot that froze the goaltender, took two more strides then fired the puck into an open net. The goal touched off a wild celebration amongst the Canadian players on the ice and the fans in the stands. Sittler's championship winning goal remains one of the most famous in hockey history. During the celebrations, the players of both teams traded uniforms; Bobby Orr was presented with the Most Valuable Player award while wearing a Czechoslovak jersey. Prime Minister Pierre Trudeau presented Canadian captain Bobby Clarke with the Canada Cup.

== Legacy ==
The tournament finale was the most watched television event in Canadian history at the time. 10,700,000 people were estimated to have watched the game, representing nearly half of all Canadians in 1976. The team that represented Canada is still considered one of the greatest national teams ever to represent the nation in a hockey tournament. For many players, winning the Canada Cup was the highlight of their careers. Bobby Orr and Lanny McDonald both rated winning this tournament ahead of winning the Stanley Cup.

The Canada Cup established a new era in international hockey. It marked Canada's formal return to the international stage after a six-year boycott, and was the first true best-on-best world championship in the sport's history. For North American audiences, the tournament established that Czechoslovakia and Sweden could compete with Canada and the Soviet Union, while the Finns and Americans proved they were capable of playing with the sport's elite teams.

== Standings ==
Team	Pld	W	D	L	GF	GA	GD	Pts	Qualification
Canada (C)	5	4	0	1	22	6	+16	8	Advanced to final
Czechoslovakia	5	3	1	1	19	9	+10	7	Advanced to final
Soviet Union	5	2	1	2	23	14	+9	5	
Sweden	5	2	1	2	16	18	−2	5	
United States	5	1	1	3	14	21	−7	3	
Finland	5	1	0	4	16	42	−26	2	

Updated to match(es) played on unknown. Source:
(C) Champions

== Results ==
=== Round-robin ===
September 2, 1976	Canada	11–2 (4–1, 2–0, 5–1)	Finland	Ottawa Civic Centre; Attendance: 9,500

Rogie Vachon
Goalies
Antti Leppänen (07:11)
Markus Mattsson (52:49)

Martin, (Lafleur, Lapointe) – (PP) 03:54	1–0
Hull, (Orr, Potvin) – 06:38	2–0
Esposito (Hull, Orr) – 07:11	3–0
Hull – 12:20	4–0
	4–1	17:09 – Oksanen (Peltonen)
Leach (Orr, Martin) – (PP) 23:13	5–1
Shutt (Savard, Mahovlich) – 26:06	6–1
Martin, (Potvin, Perreault) – 40:48	7–1
	7–2	41:42 – Makkonen (Levo, Koskinen)
Esposito (Mahovlich, Savard) – 48:25	8–2
Martin, (Perreault, Lafleur) – 51:12	9–2
Perreault, (Lafleur, Martin) – 51:38	10–2
Sittler – (SH) 55:52	11–2

12 min
Penalties
6 min
42
Shots
24

September 3, 1976	United States	2–5 (0–5, 0–0, 2–0)	Sweden	Maple Leaf Gardens; Attendance: 12,211

Mike Curran
Goalies
Hardy Åström

	0–1	06:56 (PP2) – B. Salming (Johansson, Hammarström)
	0–2	07:39 (PP) – R. Eriksson (Hedberg, Waltin)
	0–3	14:16 (PP) – Hedberg, (Bergman, R. Eriksson)
	0–4	15:45 – Widing (Lundström, Hammarström)
	0–5	19:27 (PP) – Lundström (Widing, B. Salming)
Talafous, (Ftorek) – 44:21	1–5
Talafous, (Ftorek) – 58:24	2–5

34 min
Penalties
12 min
29
Shots
37

September 3, 1976	Soviet Union	3–5 (0–2, 1–1, 2–2)	Czechoslovakia	Montreal Forum; Attendance: 16,193

Vladislav Tretiak
Goalies
Jiří Holeček

	0–1	12:09 – Nový (Pospíšil)
	0–2	19:21 – Pospíšil (Augusta, Nový)
Maltsev – (SH) 21:07	1–2
	1–3	39:38 – Nový (P. Šťastný, Machač)
Balderis (Shalimov) – 44:00	2–3
	2–4	44:33 – B. Šťastný (Martinec, Novák)
	2–5	53:06 – Martinec (Bubla)
Kovin, (Skvortsov, Gusev) – 53:59	3–5

12 min
Penalties
12 min
18
Shots
30

September 5, 1976	Sweden	3–3 (2–0, 0–1, 1–2)	Soviet Union	Montreal Forum; Attendance: 14,215

Hardy Åström
Goalies
Vladislav Tretiak

U. Nilsson (Hedberg, Bergman) – 07:48	1–0
B. Salming (Sjoberg, U. Nilsson) – (PP2) 13:12	2–0
	2–1	29:42 – Kapustin (Maltsev, Vasiliev)
	2–2	49:46 – Balderis (Zhluktov, Babinov)
	2–3	51:24 – Kapustin (Maltsev, Repnev)
Hedberg (B. Salming) – 57:28	3–3

12 min
Penalties
12 min
33
Shots
20

September 5, 1976	Finland	0–8 (0–1, 0–3, 0–4)	Czechoslovakia	Maple Leaf Gardens; Attendance: 16,309

Antti Leppänen
Goalies
Jiří Holeček

0–1	10:34 – Martinec (E. Novák, B. Šťastný)
0–2	24:11 – Augusta (Nový, P. Šťastný)
0–3	31:22 – Ebermann (Kajkl, Hlinka)
0–4	39:21 – Bubla (Holík)
0–5	40:24 – Nový (Černík)
0–6	50:24 – Bubla (M. Šťastný)
0–7	55:26 (PP) – Chalupa (Dvořák)
0–8	59:00 – Pouzar (M. Šťastný, P. Šťastný)

14 min
Penalties
12 min
15
Shots
49

September 5, 1976	United States	2–4 (0–3, 2–0, 0–1)	Canada	Montreal Forum; Attendance: 16,339

Pete LoPresti
Goalies
Rogie Vachon

	0–1	4:47 (PP) – Esposito (Dionne, Orr)
	0–2	12:51 (PP) – Mahovlich (Orr, Shutt)
	0–3	18:15 – Hull (Dionne, Potvin)
Ahern (C. Bennett, Nyrop) – 30:33	1–3
Jensen – 36:39	2–3
	2–4	59:47 (EN) – Sittler (Mahovlich)

12 min
Penalties
8 min
16
Shots
35

September 7, 1976	Soviet Union	11–3 (4–2, 4–1, 3–0)	Finland	Montreal Forum; Attendance: 16,500

Vladislav Tretiak
Goalies
Markus Mattsson (26:42)
Antti Leppänen (33:18)

Maltsev (Vasiliev, Kapustin) – (PP) 3:27	1–0
	1–1	3:57 – Rautakallio (Hagman, Kapanen)
Zhluktov (Balderis, Alexandrov) – (PP) 7:19	2–1
Zhluktov (Vasiliev, Kapustin) – PP 9:14	3–1
Repnev (Guzev, Maltsev) – (PP) 13:49	4–1
	4–2	18:23 – Makkonen (Koskinen, Rautiainen)
	4–3	23:09 (PP) – Hagman (Nummelin)
Zhluktov (Guzev, Balderis) – 25:11	5–3
Maltsev (Kapustin) – 26:42	6–3
Kapustin (Repnev, Maltsev) – 28:55	7–3
Zhluktov (Balderis, Bilyaletdinov) – 30:12	8–3
Vikulov (Alexandrov, Zhluktov) – 49:09	9–3
Vikulov (Zhluktov, Guzev) – 56:25	10–3
Kovin (Skvortsov, Belousov) – 57:12	11–3

8 min
Penalties
8 min
41
Shots
31

September 7, 1976	Czechoslovakia	4–4 (0–0, 2–4, 2–0)	United States	Philadelphia Spectrum; Attendance: 17,077

Jiří Holeček (31:02)
Vladimír Dzurilla (28:58)
Goalies
Mike Curran

Hlinka (Holík, P. Šťastný) – (PP) 21:06	1–0
	1–1	25:21 – Hangsleben (Noris, O'Flaherty)
	1–2	28:35 – Patrick (Bennett, Williams)
	1–3	29:26 – Patrick (Williams, Bennett)
Bubla (Hlinka) – 30:13	2–3
	2–4	31:02 – Ftorek (Milbury, Talafous)
Hlinka (M. Šťastný) – 45:30	3–4
Augusta (Nový) – 54:06	4–4

2 min
Penalties
10 min
35
Shots
25

September 7, 1976	Sweden	0–4 (0–1, 0–2, 0–1)	Canada	Maple Leaf Gardens; Attendance: 16,485

Hardy Åström
Goalies
Rogie Vachon

0–1	4:12 – Hull (Esposito, Dionne)
0–2	31:11 – Gainey (McDonald, Savard)
0–3	39:40 – Dionne (Mahovlich)
0–4	50:26 – Gainey (Sittler, Orr)

8 min
Penalties
18 min
28
Shots
33

September 9, 1976	Sweden	6–8 (3–1, 2–4, 1–3)	Finland	Winnipeg Arena; Attendance: 8,037

Hardy Åström
Goalies
Antti Leppänen

Johansson (B. Salming, Lundström) – 10:15	1–0
	1–1	14:51 – Rautiainen (Repo, Koskinen)
Hedberg (Labraaten) – 16:55	2–1
Hammarström (Johansson) – 17:16	3–1
Åhlberg (S. Salming, L. Eriksson) – (PP) 22:04	4–1
	4–2	22:21 – Hagman (Tamminen)
	4–3	24:12 (PP) – Makkonen (Rautakallio, Riihiranta)
	4–4	28:02 – Levo (Makkonen, Koivulahti)
L. Eriksson (Åhlberg, Brasar) – 30:56	5–4
	5–5	34:35 – Tamminen (Hagman, Levo)
	5–6	42:55 – Oksanen (Koivulahti, Riihiranta)
	5–7	52:55 – Oksanen (Koivulahti)
	5–8	54:24 (PP) – Tamminen (Repo, Hagman)
R. Eriksson (Lundström, Vikström) – (PP) 57:14	6–8

8 min
Penalties
8 min
36
Shots
31

September 9, 1976	Soviet Union	5–0 (3–0, 1–0, 1–0)	United States	Philadelphia Spectrum; Attendance: 13,776

Vladislav Tretiak
Goalies
Mike Curran

Alexandrov (Gusev, Vikulov) – 4:39	1–0
Alexandrov (Zhluktov, Vikulov) – 10:39	2–0
Zhluktov (Alexandrov, Vikulov) – 13:54	3–0
Vikulov (Kulikov) – 22:41	4–0
Repnev (Golikov) – 57:46	5–0

18 min
Penalties
32 min
30
Shots
22

September 9, 1976	Czechoslovakia	1–0 (0–0, 0–0, 1–0)	Canada	Montreal Forum; Attendance: 17,346

Vladimír Dzurilla	Goalies	Rogie Vachon
M. Nový (Augusta, Martinec) – 55:41 / 1–0
4 min	Penalties	4 min
23	Shots	29

September 11, 1976	Finland	3–6 (2–0, 0–4, 1–2)	United States	Montreal Forum; Attendance: 12,427

Antti Leppänen
Goalies
Pete LoPresti

Repo (Rautakallio, Hagman) – 17:12	1–0
Linnonmaa (Koivulahti) – 19:45	2–0
	2–1	27:20 – Ahern (Polich, Bennett)
	2–2	32:29 – Ftorek (Hangsleben, Milbury)
	2–3	36:03 – Milbury (Patrick, Williams)
	2–4	39:48 – Ftorek (Talafous, Milbury)
	2–5	48:03 – Nyrop (Patrick, Nanne)
	2–6	50:04 – Polich (Nanne, Bennett)
Rautakallio (Linnonmaa, Riihiranta – (PP) 55:55	3–6

8 min
Penalties
18 min
23
Shots
24

September 11, 1976	Sweden	2–1 (0–0, 0–1, 2–0)	Czechoslovakia	Colisée de Quebec; Attendance: 7,500

Goran Hogosta
Goalies
Vladimír Dzurilla

	0–1	11:03 (PP) – Martinec (Machač)
B. Salming (Sjöberg, L. Eriksson) – (PP) 40:31	1–1
B. Salming (Sjöberg, R. Eriksson) – (PP) 47:41	2–1

6 min
Penalties
20 min
25
Shots
28

September 11, 1976	Canada	3–1 (2–1, 1–0, 0–0)	Soviet Union	Maple Leaf Gardens; Attendance: 16,485

Rogie Vachon
Goalies
Vladislav Tretiak

Perreault (Potvin, Lafleur) – (PP) 7:08	1–0
	1–1	10:22 – Vikulov Alexanrov, Lutchenko)
Hull (Perreault, Potvin – 17:02	2–1
Barber (Clarke, Lapointe) – 37:33	3–1

6 min
Penalties
6 min
43
Shots
28

=== Final (best of three) ===
September 13, 1976	Canada	6–0 (4–0, 0–0, 2–0)	Czechoslovakia	Maple Leaf Gardens; Attendance: 16,485

Rogie Vachon
Goalies
Vladimír Dzurilla (20:00)
Jiří Holeček (40:00)

Perreault (Dionne, Hull) – 01:05	1–0
Potvin (Sittler, Lapointe) – 07:56	2–0
Orr (Esposito) – (PP) 13:34	3–0
Lafleur (Shutt, Orr) – 17:01	4–0
Orr (Esposito, Lapointe) – (PP) 51:35	5–0
D. Sittler (D. Potvin) – 59:59	6–0

10 min
Penalties
10 min
34
Shots
24

September 15, 1976	Czechoslovakia	4–5 OT (0–2, 1–0, 3–2, 0–1)	Canada	Montreal Forum; Attendance: 18,040

Jiří Holeček (03:09)
Vladimír Dzurilla (68:24)
Goalies
Rogie Vachon

	0–1	01:25 – Perreault (Lafleur, Potvin)
	0–2	03:09 – Esposito (Potvin)
Nový (Martinec, Machač) – (PP) 29:44	1–2
Pouzar (M. Šťastný, Chalupa) – 42:14	2–2
	2–3	47:48 (PP) – Clarke (Hull, Perreault) PP
Augusta (Machač, Martinec) – (PP) 55:01	3–3
M. Šťastný (Holík, Bubla) – 56:00	4–3
	4–4	57:48 – Barber (Leach, Clarke)
	4–5	71:33 – Sittler (Dionne, McDonald)

14 min
Penalties
10 min
25
Shots
39

== Statistical leaders ==
=== Scoring ===
Player	Team	GP	G	A	Pts	PIM
Viktor Zhluktov	Soviet Union	5	5	4	9	0
Bobby Orr	Canada	7	2	7	9	8
Denis Potvin	Canada	7	1	8	9	16
Bobby Hull	Canada	7	5	3	8	2
Milan Nový	Czechoslovakia	7	5	3	8	2
Gilbert Perreault	Canada	7	4	4	8	2
Vladimir Vikulov	Soviet Union	4	4	3	7	0
Börje Salming	Sweden	5	4	3	7	2
Phil Esposito	Canada	7	4	3	7	0
Alexander Maltsev	Soviet Union	5	3	4	7	2
Vladimír Martinec	Czechoslovakia	7	3	4	7	2

=== Goaltending ===
Player	Team	GP	Min	W	L	T	SO	SV%	GAA
Rogatien Vachon	Canada	7	432	6	1	0	2	.940	1.39
Vladimír Dzurilla	Czechoslovakia	5	228	1	2	1	1	.920	2.36
Vladislav Tretiak	Soviet Union	5	300	2	1	2	1	.912	2.80
Pete LoPresti	United States	2	120	1	1	0	0	.895	3.00
Jiří Holeček	Czechoslovakia	5	203	2	1	0	1	.861	3.25

Minimum 120 minutes played

== Awards ==
Recipient	Team
Most Valuable Player
Bobby Orr	Canada
All-Star team
G – Rogatien Vachon	Canada
D – Bobby Orr	Canada
D – Börje Salming	Sweden
F – Aleksandr Maltsev	Soviet Union
F – Milan Nový	Czechoslovakia
F – Darryl Sittler	Canada
Team MVPs
Rogatien Vachon	Canada
Milan Nový	Czechoslovakia
Matti Hagman	Finland
Aleksandr Maltsev	Soviet Union
Börje Salming	Sweden
Robbie Ftorek	United States
