= Gary Sargent =

American ice hockey player

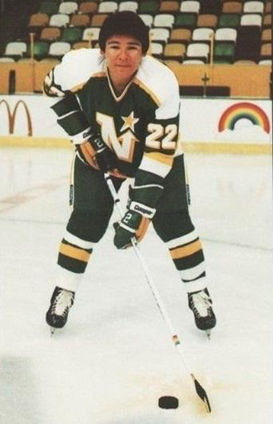
- Born: February 18, 1954 (age 72) Red Lake, Minnesota, U.S.
- Height: 5 ft 10 in (178 cm)
- Weight: 200 lb (91 kg; 14 st 4 lb)
- Position: Defense
- Shot: Left
- Played for: Los Angeles Kings; Minnesota North Stars
- National team: United States
- NHL draft: 48th overall, 1974; Los Angeles Kings
- WHA draft: 179th overall, 1974; Indianapolis Racers
- Playing career: 1974–1983

Gary Alan Sargent (born February 18, 1954) is an American former professional ice hockey defenseman who played 402 games in the National Hockey League (NHL) with the Los Angeles Kings and Minnesota North Stars between 1975 and 1983. Internationally he played for the American national team at the 1976 Canada Cup. A first-team all-star and league MVP at Bemidji State University, his professional hockey career was cut short by injuries.

== Early life ==
A member of the Ojibwa (Chippewa) nation, he was born on a reservation. Sargent was also an up-and-coming high school baseball and gridiron football player, receiving an offer to sign a professional contract with the Major League Baseball Minnesota Twins as well as several college football scholarship offers. However, Sargent decided to pursue a hockey career instead; his distant cousin Henry Boucha and later his first cousin T. J. Oshie also played in the NHL, while his younger brother Earl Sargent is a former NHL draft choice who played minor league hockey.

== Pro career ==
Sargent was drafted by the Los Angeles Kings with the 48th pick in the 1974 NHL entry draft and joined the Kings in 1975 after excelling for the United States national hockey team in the 1973 Ice Hockey World Championship and 1974 World Junior Ice Hockey Championships tournament, where he was voted most valuable defenseman. He was named the Kings' outstanding newcomer after his rookie year. He was also a US team member at the inaugural 1976 Canada Cup tournament and was voted the Kings defenseman of the year in 1976-77. In the 1977–78 season, Sargent tallied 54 points, and had a plus/minus of plus 18 on a team that was minus 2 for the season. However, the Kings failed to re-sign Sargent and he became a free agent.

In the summer of 1978, Sargent signed with his native Minnesota North Stars as a restricted free agent when his contract with the Kings ended. Minnesota had to give up three players to Los Angeles (Rick Hampton, Steve Jensen and Dave Gardner) as compensation, but Sargent quickly became one of his new team's most important defensemen in 1978–79, being on the ice for a league-record 53.1 percent of his team's goals that season. Sargent was selected for the 1980 NHL All-Star game (in Los Angeles) but was unable to participate due to persistent back and knee problems which eventually forced him to retire prematurely in 1983 after missing most of the previous three seasons.

== Post career ==
Sargent retired from the North Stars in 1983.He worked as a talent scout for them in 1986–1988. He later moved to northern Minnesota with his family.

== Career statistics ==
=== Regular season and playoffs ===
			Regular season					Playoffs
Season	Team	League	GP	G	A	Pts	PIM	GP	G	A	Pts	PIM
1968–69	Bemidji High School	HS-MN	—	—	—	—	—	—	—	—	—	—
1969–70	Bemidji High School	HS-MN	—	—	—	51	—	—	—	—	—	—
1970–71	Bemidji High School	HS-MN	—	—	—	—	—	—	—	—	—	—
1971–72	Bemidji High School	HS-MN	—	—	—	51	—	—	—	—	—	—
1972–73	Bemidji State University	NCAA III	30	23	24	47	30	—	—	—	—	—
1973–74	Fargo-Moorhead Sugar Kings	MJHL	47	37	46	83	78	—	—	—	—	—
1974–75	Springfield Indians	AHL	27	7	17	24	46	—	—	—	—	—
1975–76	Los Angeles Kings	NHL	63	8	16	24	36	—	—	—	—	—
1976–77	Los Angeles Kings	NHL	80	14	40	54	65	9	3	4	7	6
1977–78	Los Angeles Kings	NHL	72	7	34	41	52	2	0	0	0	0
1978–79	Minnesota North Stars	NHL	79	12	32	44	39	—	—	—	—	—
1979–80	Minnesota North Stars	NHL	52	13	21	34	22	4	1	2	3	2
1980–81	Minnesota North Stars	NHL	23	4	7	11	36	—	—	—	—	—
1981–82	Minnesota North Stars	NHL	15	0	5	5	18	—	—	—	—	—
1982–83	Minnesota North Stars	NHL	18	3	6	9	5	5	0	2	2	0
NHL totals			402	61	161	222	273	20	5	7	12	8

=== International ===
Year	Team	Event	GP	G	A	Pts	PIM
1973	United States	WC-B	7	1	4	5	0
1974	United States	WJC	3	0	2	2	0
1976	United States	CC	5	0	0	0	2
Junior totals			3	0	2	2	0
Senior totals			12	1	4	5	2
