= 1998 IIHF World Championship =

1998 edition of the IIHF World Championship

Tournament details
- Host country: Switzerland
- Venues: 2 (in 2 host cities)
- Dates: 1–17 May
- Opened by: Flavio Cotti
- Teams: 16

Final positions
- Champions: Sweden (7th title)
- Runners-up: Finland
- Third place: Czech Republic
- Fourth place: Switzerland

Tournament statistics
- Games played: 49
- Goals scored: 276 (5.63 per game)
- Scoring leader: (Sweden) Peter Forsberg (11 pts)

The 1998 IIHF World Championship was held in Switzerland from 1–17 May 1998. The format expanded to 16 teams for the first time. The teams were divided into four groups of four with the top two teams in each advancing to the next round. The two groups of four then played a round robin with the top two teams in each moving on to the semi-finals. The semi-finals were a two-game total goals for series as was the final.

== Venues ==
Zürich	1998 IIHF World Championship is located in Switzerland	Basel
Hallenstadion; Capacity: 12,500	1998 IIHF World Championship is located in Switzerland	St. Jakobshalle; Capacity: 9,000

== Qualifying Round (Austria) ==
Played 6–9 November 1997 in Klagenfurt. The Kazakhs, Austrians, and Norwegians finished virtually even. In head-to-head match-ups they each had one win and one loss, they each had scored as many as they had allowed. The Kazakhs scored six goals, the other two both five, pushing them to first. The Norwegians had beaten Poland by three, on the final day the Austrians pushed their advantage over Poland to four, giving them the final spot in the World Championship.

Pos	Team	Pld	W	D	L	GF	GA	GD	Pts
1	Kazakhstan	3	2	0	1	12	7	+5	4
2	Austria	3	2	0	1	9	5	+4	4
3	Norway	3	2	0	1	8	5	+3	4
4	Poland	3	0	0	3	1	13	−12	0

Kazakhstan and Austria advanced to Group A, Norway and Poland competed in Group B.

6 November 1997	Kazakhstan	6-1	Poland

6 November 1997	Austria	1-3	Norway

8 November 1997	Norway	3-0	Poland

8 November 1997	Austria	4-2	Kazakhstan

9 November 1997	Kazakhstan	4-2	Norway

9 November 1997	Austria	4-0	Poland

== First round ==
In each group, the top two nations advanced to the next round. Third place teams played a final round against each other to determine who escaped having to qualify for next year's tournament. Fourth place teams did not play further, they were automatically entered in qualifiers for next year's tournament. The highlight of the round was the French victory of the US, the first ever in an official match.

=== Group 1 ===
Pos	Team	Pld	W	D	L	GF	GA	GD	Pts
1	Czech Republic	3	3	0	0	20	5	+15	6
2	Belarus	3	2	0	1	12	10	+2	4
3	Germany	3	1	0	2	8	13	−5	2
4	Japan	3	0	0	3	7	19	−12	0

Japan was relegated to the qualifiers for the 1999 IIHF World Championship.

1 May	Czech Republic	8-2	Japan	St. Jakobshalle, Basel

1 May	Belarus	4-2	Germany	St. Jakobshalle, Basel

3 May	Belarus	2-4	Czech Republic	St. Jakobshalle, Basel

3 May	Germany	5-1	Japan	St. Jakobshalle, Basel

5 May	Japan	4-6	Belarus	St. Jakobshalle, Basel

5 May	Czech Republic	8-1	Germany	St. Jakobshalle, Basel

=== Group 2 ===
Pos	Team	Pld	W	D	L	GF	GA	GD	Pts
1	Canada	3	2	1	0	12	5	+7	5
2	Slovakia	3	2	1	0	9	4	+5	5
3	Italy	3	1	0	2	8	8	0	2
4	Austria	3	0	0	3	3	15	−12	0

Austria was relegated to the qualifiers for the 1999 IIHF World Championship.

1 May	Canada	5-1	Austria	Hallenstadion, Zürich

1 May	Italy	1-2	Slovakia	Hallenstadion, Zürich

3 May	Slovakia	2-2	Canada	Hallenstadion, Zürich

3 May	Italy	5-1	Austria	Hallenstadion, Zürich

5 May	Austria	1-5	Slovakia	Hallenstadion, Zürich

5 May	Canada	5-2	Italy	Hallenstadion, Zürich

=== Group 3 ===
Pos	Team	Pld	W	D	L	GF	GA	GD	Pts
1	Sweden	3	3	0	0	16	4	+12	6
2	Switzerland	3	1	0	2	9	10	−1	2
3	United States	3	1	0	2	7	11	−4	2
4	France	3	1	0	2	5	12	−7	2

France was relegated to the qualifiers for the 1999 IIHF World Championship.

2 May	United States	5-2	Switzerland	Hallenstadion, Zürich

2 May	Sweden	6-1	France	Hallenstadion, Zürich

4 May	France	3-1	United States	Hallenstadion, Zürich

4 May	Sweden	4-2	Switzerland	Hallenstadion, Zürich

6 May	United States	1-6	Sweden	Hallenstadion, Zürich

6 May	Switzerland	5-1	France	Hallenstadion, Zürich

=== Group 4 ===
Pos	Team	Pld	W	D	L	GF	GA	GD	Pts
1	Russia	3	3	0	0	19	11	+8	6
2	Finland	3	2	0	1	12	4	+8	4
3	Latvia	3	1	0	2	12	15	−3	2
4	Kazakhstan	3	0	0	3	6	19	−13	0

Kazakhstan was relegated to the qualifiers for the 1999 IIHF World Championship.

2 May	Russia	8-4	Kazakhstan	St. Jakobshalle, Basel

2 May	Finland	6-0	Latvia	St. Jakobshalle, Basel

4 May	Latvia	5-7	Russia	St. Jakobshalle, Basel

4 May	Finland	4-0	Kazakhstan	St. Jakobshalle, Basel

6 May	Kazakhstan	2-7	Latvia	St. Jakobshalle, Basel

6 May	Russia	4-2	Finland	St. Jakobshalle, Basel

== Consolation Round 9-12 Place ==
Pos	Team	Pld	W	D	L	GF	GA	GD	Pts
9	Latvia	3	2	1	0	9	3	+6	5
10	Italy	3	1	2	0	9	5	+4	4
11	Germany	3	0	2	1	5	10	−5	2
12	United States	3	0	1	2	3	8	−5	1

Germany and the United States were relegated to the qualifiers for the 1999 IIHF World Championship.

8 May	United States	1-1	Germany	Hallenstadion, Zürich

8 May	Italy	1-1	Latvia	Hallenstadion, Zürich

10 May	Italy	4-0	United States	Hallenstadion, Zürich

10 May	Germany	0-5	Latvia	St. Jakobshalle, Basel

11 May	Germany	4-4	Italy	Hallenstadion, Zürich

11 May	Latvia	3-2	United States	Hallenstadion, Zürich

== Second round ==
Group 2 and 3 first place teams played against group 1 and 4 second place teams in group 5, and group 1 and 4 first place teams played against group 2 and 3 second place teams in group 6. The top two, from each group, advanced to the semi-finals.

=== Group 5 ===
Pos	Team	Pld	W	D	L	GF	GA	GD	Pts
1	Sweden	3	3	0	0	10	2	+8	6
2	Finland	3	1	1	1	8	6	+2	3
3	Canada	3	1	1	1	10	12	−2	3
4	Belarus	3	0	0	3	5	13	−8	0

7 May	Sweden	1-0 (0-0, 1-0, 0-0)	Finland	Hallenstadion, Zürich

25:28 (PP1) − Mattias Öhlund / 1-0

7 May	Belarus	2-6	Canada	Hallenstadion, Zürich

9 May	Canada	3-3	Finland	Hallenstadion, Zürich

9 May	Sweden	2-1	Belarus	Hallenstadion, Zürich

10 May	Canada	1-7	Sweden	Hallenstadion, Zürich

10 May	Finland	5-2	Belarus	Hallenstadion, Zürich

=== Group 6 ===
Pos	Team	Pld	W	D	L	GF	GA	GD	Pts
1	Czech Republic	3	2	1	0	6	3	+3	5
2	Switzerland	3	1	1	1	6	6	0	3
3	Russia	3	1	1	1	10	7	+3	3
4	Slovakia	3	0	1	2	2	8	−6	1

7 May	Slovakia	0-1	Czech Republic	St. Jakobshalle, Basel

7 May	Russia	2-4	Switzerland	St. Jakobshalle, Basel

9 May	Czech Republic	3-1	Switzerland	St. Jakobshalle, Basel

9 May	Russia	6-1	Slovakia	St. Jakobshalle, Basel

10 May	Czech Republic	2-2	Russia	St. Jakobshalle, Basel

10 May	Switzerland	1-1	Slovakia	St. Jakobshalle, Basel

== Final round ==
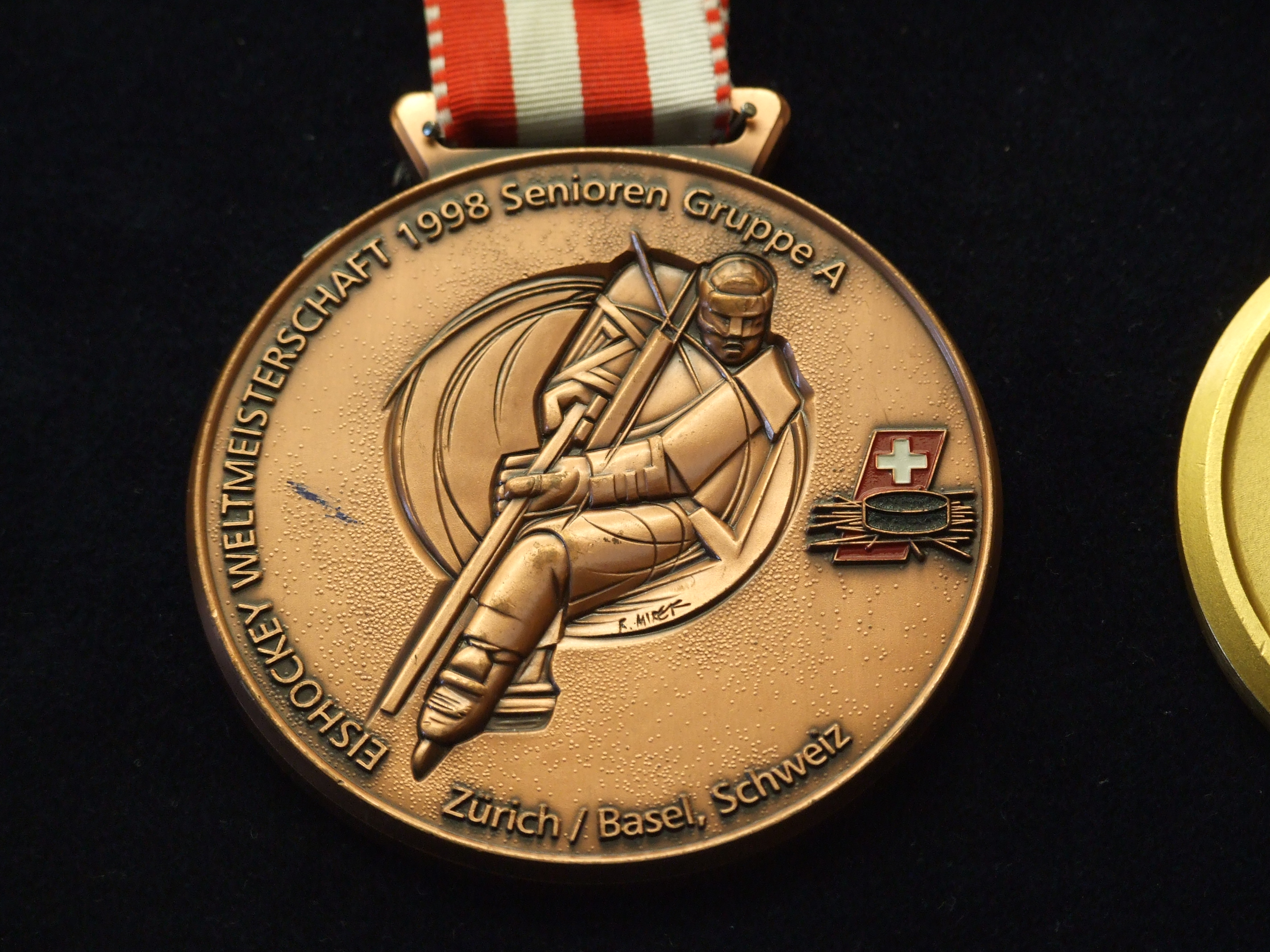
medal of the tournament

=== Bracket ===
Semifinals
12 and 14 May – Zürich
Sweden	4	7	2
Switzerland	1	2	0
12 and 14 May – Zürich
Czech Republic	1	2	0
Finland	4	2	1

Finals
16 and 17 May – Zürich
Sweden	1	0	1
Finland	0	0	0
Bronze medal game
15 May – Zürich
Czech Republic	4
Switzerland	0

=== Semifinals ===
12 May	Sweden	4–1 (1–0, 0–0, 3–1)	Switzerland	Hallenstadion, Zürich

12 May	Czech Republic	1–4 (1–1, 0–1, 0–2)	Finland	Hallenstadion, Zürich

14 May	Switzerland	2–7 (0–4, 0–1, 2–2)	Sweden	Hallenstadion, Zürich

14 May	Finland	2–2 (0–0, 0–1, 2–1)	Czech Republic	Hallenstadion, Zürich

=== Match for third place ===
15 May	Czech Republic	4–0 (0–0, 3–0, 1–0)	Switzerland	Hallenstadion, Zürich

=== Final ===
16 May	Finland	0–1 (0–0, 0–0, 0–1)	Sweden	Hallenstadion, Zürich; Attendance: 9,300

Ari Sulander	Goalies	Tommy Salo	Referee: (United States) Alex Dell
0–1 / 50:07 − Johan Tornberg			Referee: (United States) Alex Dell

17 May	Sweden	0–0 (0–0, 0–0, 0–0)	Finland	Hallenstadion, Zürich; Attendance: 12,500

Tommy Salo	Goalies	Ari Sulander

== Ranking and statistics ==
1998 IIHF World Championship winners

Sweden
7th title

=== Tournament Awards ===
- Best players selected by the directorate:
  - Best Goaltender: (Finland) Ari Sulander
  - Best Defenceman: (Czech Republic) František Kučera
  - Best Forward: (Sweden) Peter Forsberg
- Media All-Star Team:
  - Goaltender: (Sweden) Tommy Salo
  - Defence: (Finland) Jere Karalahti, (Czech Republic) František Kučera
  - Forwards: (Sweden) Peter Forsberg, (Finland) Ville Peltonen, (Sweden) Mats Sundin

=== Final standings ===
The final standings of the tournament according to IIHF:

1st place, gold medalist(s)	Sweden
2nd place, silver medalist(s)	Finland
3rd place, bronze medalist(s)	Czech Republic
4	Switzerland
5	Russia
6	Canada
7	Slovakia
8	Belarus
9	Latvia
10	Italy
11	Germany
12	United States
13	France
14	Japan
15	Austria
16	Kazakhstan

Places eleven through sixteen were not relegated but had to play in qualifying tournaments for inclusion in the 1999 championship.

=== Scoring leaders ===
List shows the top skaters sorted by points, then goals.

Player	GP	G	A	Pts	+/−	PIM	POS
(Sweden) Peter Forsberg	7	6	5	11	+9	0	F
(Sweden) Mats Sundin	10	5	6	11	+13	6	F
(Finland) Raimo Helminen	10	2	9	11	0	0	F
(Finland) Ville Peltonen	10	4	6	10	0	8	F
(Czech Republic) Radek Bělohlav	9	6	3	9	+7	2	F
(Czech Republic) Pavel Patera	9	6	3	9	+6	12	F
(Russia) Viktor Kozlov	6	4	5	9	+5	0	F
(Russia) Sergei Berezin	6	6	2	8	+2	2	F
(Latvia) Oleg Znaroks	6	5	3	8	+4	2	F
(Sweden) Mikael Renberg	10	5	3	8	+6	6	F

Source: quanthockey.com

=== Leading goaltenders ===
Only the top five goaltenders, based on save percentage, who have played 40% of their team's minutes are included in this list.

Player	MIP	GA	GAA	SVS%	SO
(Sweden) Tommy Salo	540	7	0.78	.959	3
(Finland) Ari Sulander	477	10	1.26	.956	2
(Italy) Mike Rosati	299	8	1.61	.950	1
(Czech Republic) Milan Hnilička	430	10	1.40	.940	2
(France) François Gravel	94	4	2.55	.938	0

Source: quanthockey.com

== IIHF honors and awards ==
The 1998 IIHF Hall of Fame induction ceremony has held in Zürich during the World Championships. Wolf-Dieter Montag of Germany was given the Paul Loicq Award for outstanding contributions to international ice hockey.

IIHF Hall of Fame inductees

- Canada: W. A. Hewitt, Marshall Johnston, Terry O'Malley, Harry Watson
- Czech Republic: Karel Gut, Jiří Holeček
- Finland: Pekka Marjamäki
- France: Jacques Lacarrière
- Germany: Gustav Jaenecke, Xaver Unsinn
- Great Britain: Carl Erhardt
- Latvia: Helmuts Balderis
- Romania: Eduard Pană
- Russia: Anatoli Firsov, Valeri Kharlamov, Viktor Tikhonov, Valeri Vasiliev
- Slovakia: Vladimír Dzurilla, Jozef Golonka
- Sweden: Lasse Björn, Håkan Loob, Börje Salming, Arne Strömberg
- Switzerland: Ferdinand Cattini, Hans Cattini, Cesar Lüthi
- United States: Bill Christian, Jack McCartan, Robert Ridder, John P. Riley Jr.

== See also ==
- 1998 World Junior Ice Hockey Championships
