= Boris Aleksandrov (ice hockey) =

Soviet and Kazakhstani ice hockey player

- Born: November 13, 1955 Ust-Kamenogorsk, Kazakh SSR, Soviet Union
- Died: July 31, 2002 (aged 46) Chelyabinsk Oblast, Russia
- Height: 5 ft 9 in (175 cm)
- Weight: 181 lb (82 kg; 12 st 13 lb)
- Position: Right wing
- Shot: Right
- Played for: Torpedo Ust-Kamenogorsk; CSKA Moscow; SKA MVO Moscow; Spartak Moscow; HC Milano Saima; Alisa Moskva
- National team: Soviet Union and Kazakhstan
- Playing career: 1972–1992; 1994–1996

Olympic medal record

Representing Soviet Union

Ice hockey

Olympic Games
Gold medal – first place	1976 Innsbruck	Ice hockey

World Junior Championships
Gold medal – first place	1974 Leningrad	Ice hockey
Gold medal – first place	1975 Canada/USA	Ice hockey

European Junior Championships
Silver medal – second place	1974 Switzerland	Ice hockey

Representing Kazakhstan

Asian Winter Games
Gold medal – first place	1996 China	Ice hockey

Boris Viktorovich Alexandrov (Russian: Борис Викторович Александров; November 13, 1955 - July 31, 2002) was a Soviet and Kazakh professional ice hockey player. Alexandrov competed for Torpedo Ust-Kamenogorsk and CSKA Moscow and also Spartak Moscow. He was Soviet league champion in 1975, 1977 and 1978, additionally he won a gold medal at the 1976 Winter Olympic Games. He was posthumously inducted into the IIHF Hall of Fame in 2019.

== Career ==
Boris Alexandrov represented the Soviet Union successfully at the IIHF World Junior Championship winning a gold medal in 1974 and 1975. He played only one full season in 1976 with the Soviet Union national ice hockey team, playing in 19 games, scoring four goals and winning an Olympic gold medal and playing in the 1976 Canada Cup. On New Year's Eve 1975 he played in the classic 3 to 3 tie game with CSKA Moscow versus the eventual Stanley Cup champion Montreal Canadiens during the Super Series '76. His third period goal, "the youngest Soviet at age 20, converted a 2-on-1 setup from Viktor Zhluktov to tie the score," helped make this game one of the greatest ever played. (The game was ranked as the 23rd greatest hockey story by the IIHF.)

Even though a talented and successful hockey player at both the national and international level, Alexandrov was dropped from the USSR national team "because the coaches thought he was too individualistic in his approach, thus hurting the team" (though disagreements with coach Viktor Tikhonov about discipline were also an important reason.) His reputation was not helped when he viciously cross checked Spartak player Valentin Gureev from behind in February 1977, giving him a severe concussion.

But he had a very long career at the club level, which lasted well into the 1990s. Alexandrov began to play hockey with Torpedo Ust-Kamenogorsk in 1972, but in 1973 joined powerhouse CSKA Moscow and played there until 1978. With CSKA Moscow Alexandrov won three Soviet Championship titles (1975, 1977 and 1978) and three IIHF European Cup titles (1974, 1976, 1978). After leaving CSKA Moskva Alexandrov played one season with SKA MVO Moscow, before joining Spartak Moscow from 1980 to 1982. In 1980 while playing with Spartak Moscow Alexandrov was selected as part of the best line at the Soviet Championships. From 1982 to 1989 Alexandrov again played with Torpedo Ust-Kamenogorsk, before spending two seasons playing with HC Milano Saima, and Alisa Moscow.

Alexandrov ended his playing career with Torpedo Ust-Kamenogorsk from 1994 to 1996. In 1995 at the age of 40, he also played four games for the Kazakhstan national team and scored two goals.

By the end of his 22-season career he had scored an amazing 602 goals.

From 1996 until his untimely death in 2002, Alexandrov worked as a head coach of both Torpedo Ust-Kamenogorsk and the Kazakhstan men's national ice hockey team. His success with the Kazakhstan team was meteoric, winning Pool C in 1996, finishing second in Pool B in 1997, winning the Qualification Round in 1998, from which the team went on to play in the 1998 IIHF World Championship and the 1998 Winter Olympics. In 2019 Alexandrov was elected into the IIHF Hall of Fame as a builder for his years as a coach for Kazakhstan.

On 31 July 2002 Alexandrov died in an accident with another car near the town of Ust-Katav on the highway between Ufa and Chelyabinsk. He tried to overtake a bus, but had a head-on collision with a car in the opposite lane. At the scene of the accident there is a monument in form of a puck and a picture of Aleksandrov. He is buried in Moscow Mitinskoe Cemetery.

== Career statistics ==
=== Regular season ===
Season	Team	League	GP	G	A	Pts	PIM
1971–72	Torpedo Ust-Kamenogorsk	USSR-2	3	2	1	3	4
1972–73	Torpedo Ust-Kamenogorsk	USSR-2	28	12	4	16	8
1973-74	CSKA Moscow	USSR	14	8	3	11	10
1974-75	CSKA Moscow	USSR	33	20	8	28	25
1975-76	CSKA Moscow	USSR	35	22	16	38	27
1976-77	CSKA Moscow	USSR	31	24	17	41	35
1977-78	CSKA Moscow	USSR	20	12	5	17	20
1978-79	CSKA Moscow	USSR	6	3	7	10	9
1978-79	SKA MVO Moskva	USSR-2	49	57	30	87	97
1979-80	Spartak Moscow	USSR	43	22	23	45	52
1980-81	Spartak Moscow	USSR	28	15	7	22	32
1981-82	Spartak Moscow	USSR	14	1	0	1	10
1982–83	Torpedo Ust-Kamenogorsk	USSR-2	67	66	-	-	-
1983–84	Torpedo Ust-Kamenogorsk	USSR-2	56	50	-	-	-
1984–85	Torpedo Ust-Kamenogorsk	USSR-2	34	37	19	56	50
1985–86	Torpedo Ust-Kamenogorsk	USSR-2	54	52	30	82	97
1986–87	Torpedo Ust-Kamenogorsk	USSR-2	64	62	50	112	128
1987-88	Torpedo Ust-Kamenogorsk	USSR	26	21	12	33	56
1988–89	Torpedo Ust-Kamenogorsk	USSR-2	57	56	32	88	68
1989-90	HC Milano Saima	Serie A	29	31	27	58	37
1991–92	Alisa Moskva	USSR-4	-	9	10	19	-
1994-95	Torpedo Ust-Kamenogorsk	IHL	30	14	19	33	18
1995-96	Torpedo Ust-Kamenogorsk	IHL	13	6	3	9	18
22 seasons - totals			734	602	323	925	806

=== International ===
Year	Team	Event	GP	G	A	Pts	PIM
1974	Soviet Union	EJC	5	8	7	15	12
1974	Soviet Union	WJC	5	6	1	7	22
1975	Soviet Union	WJC	5	2	3	5	16
1976	CSKA Moscow	SS76	4	3	3	6	8
1976	Soviet Union	OG	6	2	3	5	0
1976	Soviet Union	CC	5	2	4	6	2
1995	Kazakhstan	WC C	4	2	3	5	4
1996	Kazakhstan	AWG	3	0	0	0	0

== Honors ==
- Won an Olympic gold medal in 1976 with Soviet Union national ice hockey team.
- Scored 148 goals in 250 games in the Soviet Championship League.
- Scored 394 goals in 412 games in the USSR-2 league.
- He competed at the Super Series '76 with the team CSKA Moscow and scored against New York Rangers, Montreal Canadiens and Boston Bruins.
- All Star Team in 1975 World Junior Ice Hockey Championships.
- Won Soviet championships in 1975, 1977 and 1978.
- Posthumously inducted into the IIHF Hall of Fame in 2019.

== Personal life ==
His son Viktor Alexandrov was a professional ice hockey player. He was drafted 83rd overall by the St. Louis Blues in the 2004 NHL entry draft, but he never signed a contract.
