= Mihails Vasiļonoks =

Latvian ice hockey player (1948–2023)

- Born: 1 May 1948; Taurkalne, Latvian SSR, Soviet Union
- Died: 30 April 2023 (aged 74)
- Position: Goaltender
- Caught: Right
- Played for: Dinamo Riga
- Playing career: 1978–1989

Mihails Vasiļonoks (1 May 1948 – 30 April 2023) was a Latvian ice hockey goaltender who played for Dinamo Riga. After his hockey player career ended he went on to become the director of hockey operations for HK Liepājas Metalurgs and goalie coach for Latvia national team. Vasiļonoks was part of USSR team roster for the 1976 Canada Cup, but did not play any games.

Vasiļonoks died on 30 April 2023, at the age of 74.
