= Joe Noris =

American ice hockey player (born 1951)

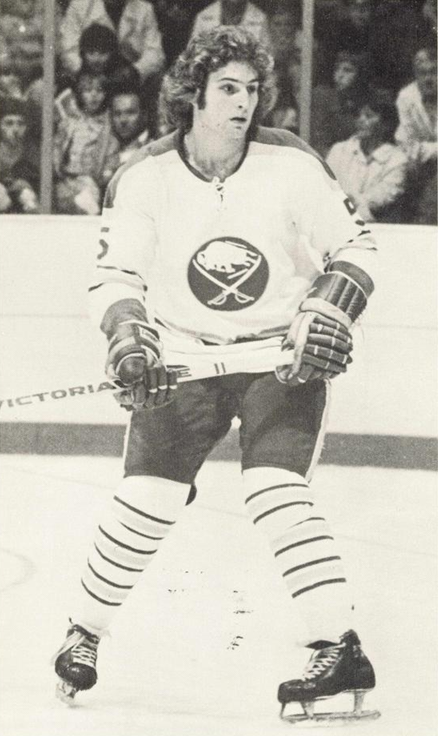
- Noris in 1973 postcard
- Born: October 26, 1951 (age 74) Denver, Colorado, U.S.
- Height: 6 ft 0 in (183 cm)
- Weight: 185 lb (84 kg; 13 st 3 lb)
- Position: Center
- Shot: Right
- Played for: Pittsburgh Penguins; St. Louis Blues; Buffalo Sabres; San Diego Mariners; Birmingham Bulls; ATSE Graz
- National team: United States
- NHL draft: 32nd overall, 1971; Pittsburgh Penguins
- Playing career: 1971–1979

Joseph S. Noris (born October 26, 1951) is an American former professional ice hockey center. He played in the National Hockey League between 1971 and 1974, and the World Hockey Association between 1975 and 1978. Internationally he played for the American national team at the 1976 Canada Cup.

== Playing career ==
Drafted in the third round, 32nd overall, by the Pittsburgh Penguins in the 1971 NHL Amateur Draft, Noris played 55 regular season games in the National Hockey League with the Penguins, St. Louis Blues, and Buffalo Sabres in 1971–74. He also played in the World Hockey Association with the San Diego Mariners and the Birmingham Bulls, skating in 198 WHA games, scoring 72 goals and adding 116 assists from 1975–1978.

Noris was selected to the 1977 WHA All-Star Game as the Mariners representative and also played for the United States at the inaugural 1976 Canada Cup tournament.

Noris was the first player who grew up in Colorado to make it to the NHL. He would be the only Colorado native to suit up until Parris Duffus played a single game in 1997.

== Personal life ==
Noris currently owns and runs Skate San Diego, a roller hockey rink in Santee, California.

== Career statistics ==
=== Regular season and playoffs ===
			Regular season					Playoffs
Season	Team	League	GP	G	A	Pts	PIM	GP	G	A	Pts	PIM
1968–69	Kitchener Rangers	OHA	18	5	9	14	21	—	—	—	—	—
1969–70	Kitchener Rangers	OHA	48	27	19	46	45	—	—	—	—	—
1970–71	Toronto Marlboros	OHA	42	12	24	36	22	—	—	—	—	—
1971–72	Hershey Bears	AHL	42	8	15	23	37	4	1	1	2	8
1971–72	Pittsburgh Penguins	NHL	35	2	5	7	20	—	—	—	—	—
1972–73	San Diego Gulls	WHL	25	3	13	16	14	—	—	—	—	—
1972–73	Denver Spurs	WHL	35	10	18	28	14	5	1	2	3	7
1972–73	Hershey Bears	AHL	8	2	5	7	9	—	—	—	—	—
1972–73	St. Louis Blues	NHL	2	0	0	0	0	—	—	—	—	—
1973–74	Cincinnati Swords	AHL	28	5	13	18	20	5	3	3	6	0
1973–74	Buffalo Sabres	NHL	18	0	0	0	2	—	—	—	—	—
1974–75	Syracuse Eagles	AHL	73	26	36	62	41	1	1	1	2	0
1975–76	San Diego Mariners	WHA	80	28	40	68	24	11	2	4	6	6
1976–77	San Diego Mariners	WHA	73	35	57	92	30	7	2	1	3	6
1977–78	Birmingham Bulls	WHA	45	9	19	28	6	—	—	—	—	—
1978–79	San Diego Hawks	PHL	58	27	77	104	8	—	—	—	—	—
1979–80	ATSE Graz	AUT	6	2	2	4	2	—	—	—	—	—
WHA totals			198	72	116	188	60	18	4	5	9	12
NHL totals			55	2	5	7	22	—	—	—	—	—

=== International ===
Year	Team	Event	GP	G	A	Pts	PIM
1976	United States	CC	4	0	1	1	6
Senior totals			4	0	1	1	6
