= Karel Holý =

Czech ice hockey player (1956–2024)

Personal information
- Nationality: Czech
- Born: 3 February 1956 Prague, Czechoslovakia
- Died: 23 November 2024 (aged 68) Prague, Czech Republic

Sport
- Sport: Ice hockey

Karel Holý (3 February 1956 – 23 November 2024) was a Czech professional ice hockey forward.

Holý played the majority of his career with HC Sparta Praha, from 1974 to 1978 and again from 1980 to 1986. He also played for HC Dukla Jihlava as well as in Germany's Eishockey-Bundesliga for ESV Kaufbeuren and in Finland's II-divisioona for IPK.

Holý was also a member of the Czechoslovakia national team. He competed in the men's tournament at the 1980 Winter Olympics.

Holý died in Prague on 23 November 2024, at the age of 68.
