= Roland Eriksson =

Swedish ice hockey player

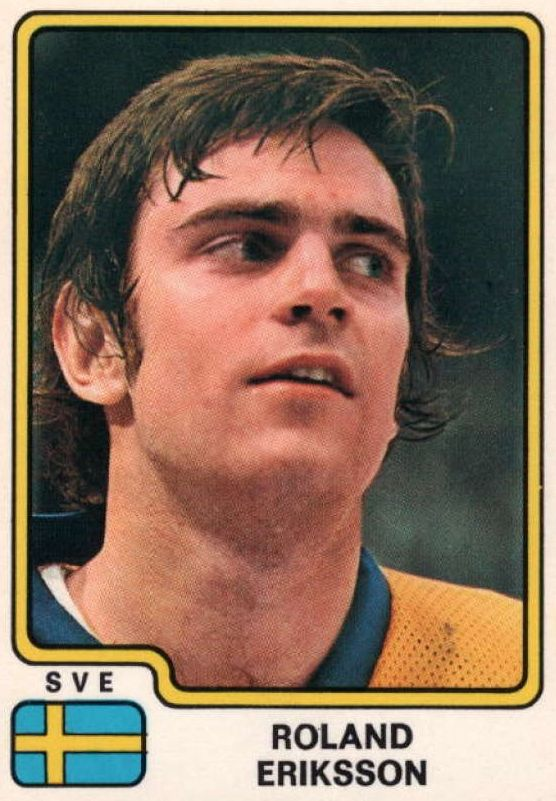
- Born: March 1, 1954 (age 72) Stora Tuna, Sweden
- Height: 6 ft 3 in (191 cm)
- Weight: 190 lb (86 kg; 13 st 8 lb)
- Position: Centre
- Shot: Left
- Played for: Minnesota North Stars; Vancouver Canucks; Winnipeg Jets (WHA)
- National team: Sweden
- NHL draft: 131st overall, 1974; Minnesota North Stars
- Playing career: 1976–1979

Roland Bengt Eriksson (born March 1, 1954, in Stora Tuna, Sweden) is a retired Swedish ice hockey forward who played in the National Hockey League during the late 1970s.

== Playing career ==
Following a stellar performance at the 1974 World Junior Championships, Eriksson was selected 131st overall by the Minnesota North Stars, the first Swede ever drafted by the franchise. In the following two seasons, he would continue to excel in Sweden with Leksands IF. In 1975–76, he was named to the Swedish All-Star Team, and turned in a standout performance at the World Championships, recording 15 points in 10 games. That summer, he was signed by the North Stars and set high expectations for himself with a strong performance against NHL players at the 1976 Canada Cup tournament.

A tall, classy, playmaking center, Eriksson broke into the NHL in 1976–77 with four assists in his first game to tie an NHL record. He continued on to finish the season with 25 goals and 44 assists to set a North Stars rookie record (since broken) with 69 points. He led all NHL rookies in assists and points, but finished only third in Calder Memorial Trophy voting for the league's top freshman.

In 1977–78, Eriksson continued to be one of the lone bright lights on a North Stars team which finished the season with just 18 wins. He led the team with 39 assists and 60 points, and was selected to play in the 1978 NHL All-Star Game.

Following his second season in Minnesota, Eriksson became an unrestricted free agent, and signed with the Vancouver Canucks. He was one of four Swedes to join the club for 1978–79, although he was the only one with previous NHL experience. Coming off an All-Star season in Minnesota, expectations were high, but Eriksson struggled. He found himself behind Don Lever and Thomas Gradin on the depth chart at center for the Canucks, and scored just 2 goals and 14 points in 35 games. He was ultimately released by the Canucks mid-way through the season, and finished the year in the World Hockey Association with the Winnipeg Jets. His previous offensive touch continued to elude him in Winnipeg, however, as he recorded 5 goals and 15 points in 33 games.

After the disappointment of the previous season, Eriksson returned to Sweden and Leksands IF in 1979. Aside from two years in Germany from 1980 to 1982, he continued to be a productive player in the Swedish Elite League for most of the 1980s. He last played in the SEL in 1989, for Västerås IK, and played a few more years in lower-tier leagues before retiring in 1992.

In 193 NHL games, Eriksson recorded 48 goals and 95 assists for 143 points, along with just 26 penalty minutes. He was also one of the most decorated Swedes of his time in international play, representing his country in five world championships between 1976 and 1983 - winning two silver medals and a bronze.

== Career statistics ==
=== Regular season and playoffs ===
			Regular season					Playoffs
Season	Team	League	GP	G	A	Pts	PIM	GP	G	A	Pts	PIM
1969–70	IF Tunabro	SWE.2	22	11	15	26	—	—	—	—	—	—
1970–71	IF Tunabro	SWE.2	16	17	12	29	—	—	—	—	—	—
1971–72	IF Tunabro	SWE	14	5	3	8	4	—	—	—	—	—
1972–73	IF Tunabro	SWE	14	10	2	12	0	—	—	—	—	—
1973–74	IF Tunabro	SWE	14	7	5	12	2	—	—	—	—	—
1974–75	Leksands IF	SWE	28	11	16	27	14	—	—	—	—	—
1975–76	Leksands IF	SEL	36	21	14	35	16	4	9	3	12	0
1976–77	Minnesota North Stars	NHL	80	25	44	69	10	2	1	0	1	0
1977–78	Minnesota North Stars	NHL	78	21	39	60	12	—	—	—	—	—
1978–79	Vancouver Canucks	NHL	35	2	12	14	4	—	—	—	—	—
1978–79	Winnipeg Jets	WHA	33	5	10	15	2	10	1	4	5	0
1979–80	Leksands IF	SEL	35	18	21	39	14	2	3	1	4	0
1980–81	Düsseldorfer EG	1.GBun	40	31	55	86	24	11	6	15	21	0
1981–82	Düsseldorfer EG	1.GBun	37	30	38	68	14	—	—	—	—	—
1982–83	Leksands IF	SEL	36	20	27	47	16	—	—	—	—	—
1983–84	Leksands IF	SEL	36	20	20	40	20	—	—	—	—	—
1984–85	HV71	SWE.2	32	31	42	73	4	—	—	—	—	—
1985–86	HV71	SEL	35	11	15	26	10	2	0	0	0	2
1986–87	Västerås IK Hockey	SWE.2	31	23	26	49	8	12	4	9	13	4
1987–88	Västerås IK Hockey	SWE.2	31	19	23	42	4	14	9	15	24	0
1988–89	Västerås IK Hockey	SEL	21	8	7	15	8	—	—	—	—	—
1988–89	Västerås IK Hockey	Allsv	18	5	8	13	0	—	—	—	—	—
1989–90	IK Westmannia	SWE.3	32	24	37	61	4	—	—	—	—	—
1991–92	IFK Arboga IK	SWE.3	28	15	25	40	10	—	—	—	—	—
SWE totals			70	33	26	59	20	—	—	—	—	—
SEL totals			199	98	104	202	84	8	12	4	16	2
NHL totals			193	48	96	143	26	2	1	0	1	0
WHA totals			33	5	10	15	2	10	1	4	5	0

=== International ===
Year	Team	Event	GP	G	A	Pts	PIM
1971	Sweden	EJC	3	3	1	4	0
1972	Sweden	EJC	5	4	2	6	0
1973	Sweden	EJC	5	3	5	8	0
1974	Sweden	WJC	5	5	4	9	0
1976	Sweden	WC	10	8	7	15	0
1976	Sweden	CC	5	2	2	4	2
1977	Sweden	WC	10	7	5	12	0
1978	Sweden	WC	10	1	2	3	2
1981	Sweden	WC	8	2	1	3	2
1983	Sweden	WC	10	2	2	4	2
Junior totals			18	15	12	27	0
Senior totals			53	22	19	41	8
