= Viktor Zhluktov =

Russian ice hockey player

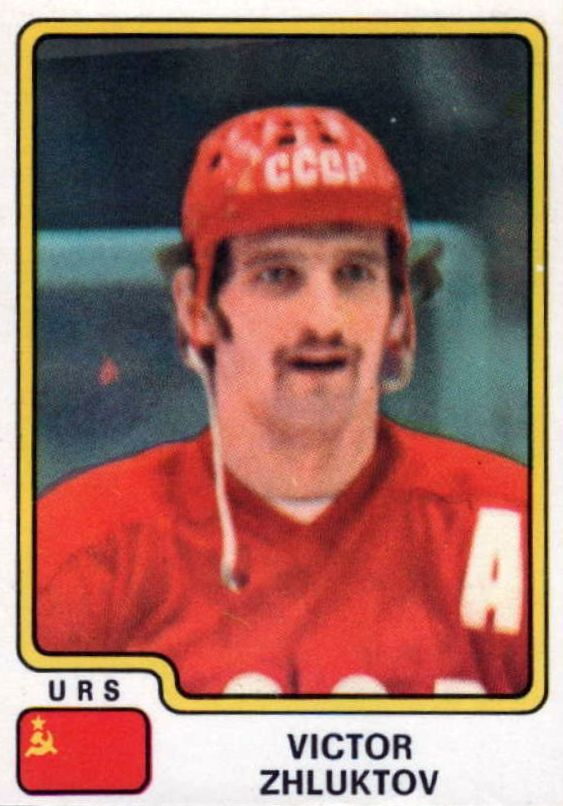
- Born: January 26, 1954 (age 72) Inta, Russian SFSR, Soviet Union
- Height: 6 ft 2 in (188 cm)
- Weight: 209 lb (95 kg; 14 st 13 lb)
- Position: Centre
- Shot: Left
- Played for: HC CSKA Moscow
- National team: Soviet Union
- NHL draft: 143rd overall, 1982; Minnesota North Stars
- Playing career: 1972–1985
Medal record
Representing Soviet Union
Ice hockey
Olympic Games
Gold medal – first place	1976 Innsbruck	Team
Silver medal – second place	1980 Lake Placid	Team
World Championships
Silver medal – second place	1976 Poland
Bronze medal – third place	1977 Austria
Gold medal – first place	1978 Czechoslovakia
Gold medal – first place	1979 Soviet Union
Gold medal – first place	1981 Sweden
Gold medal – first place	1982 Finland
Gold medal – first place	1983 West Germany
Canada Cup
Gold medal – first place	1981 Canada
World Junior Championships
Gold medal – first place	1974 Leningrad	Ice hockey
European Junior Championships
Gold medal – first place	1973 Soviet Union	Ice hockey

Viktor Vasilievich Zhluktov (Russian: Виктор Васильевич Жлуктов, born January 26, 1954) is a Russian former professional ice hockey player who played for CSKA Moscow and the Soviet Union. He is an Olympic gold and silver medalist, and has won 5 world championships.

He played his entire career, 13 seasons, with the top Soviet team CSKA Moskva. He represented the Soviet Union men's national ice hockey team in 195 games, scoring 79 goals. He was awarded a place in the Russian and Soviet Hockey Hall of Fame in 1978.

In the 1976 Canada Cup, Zhluktov scored 5 goals and 4 assists in 5 games, tying him for both the most points (with Bobby Orr and Denis Potvin) and goals (with Milan Nový and Bobby Hull) in the tournament, despite playing two fewer games than the players he tied with.

For a while he played in the same line-up as Vladimir Krutov, Sergei Makarov, Viacheslav Fetisov and Alexei Kasatonov before Igor Larionov replaced him.

== Career stats ==
=== International ===
Year	Team	Event	GP	G	A	Pts	PIM
1973	Soviet Union	EJC	5	4	3	7	6
1974	Soviet Union	WJC	5	1	2	3	4
1976	CSKA Moscow	SS76	4	0	4	4	2
1976	Soviet Union	OG	6	2	9	11	2
1976	Soviet Union	WC	9	5	6	11	0
1976	Soviet Union	CC	5	5	4	9	0
1977	Soviet Union	WC	10	5	5	10	2
1978	Soviet Union	WC	9	3	5	8	6
1979	Soviet Union	WC	8	4	3	7	2
1980	Soviet Union	OG	7	3	7	10	0
1981	Soviet Union	WC	8	2	3	5	8
1981	Soviet Union	CC	7	2	0	2	4
1982	Soviet Union	WC	10	3	0	3	2
1983	Soviet Union	WC	10	3	5	8	2
