= Timo Saari =

Finnish ice hockey player (born 1949)

Personal information
- Nationality: Finnish
- Born: 14 January 1949 (age 76) Tampere, Finland

Sport
- Sport: Ice hockey

Timo Saari (born 14 January 1949) is a Finnish ice hockey player. He competed in the men's tournament at the 1976 Winter Olympics.
