= Fred Ahern (ice hockey) =

American ice hockey player (born 1952)

- Born: February 12, 1952 (age 74) Boston, Massachusetts, U.S.
- Height: 6 ft 0 in (183 cm)
- Weight: 180 lb (82 kg; 12 st 12 lb)
- Position: Right Wing
- Shot: Right
- Played for: California Golden Seals; Cleveland Barons; Colorado Rockies
- National team: United States
- NHL draft: Undrafted
- Playing career: 1974–1982

Frederick Vincent Ahern Jr. (born February 12, 1952) is an American former professional ice hockey player who played 146 games in the National Hockey League (NHL) from in 1974 through 1978. A graduate of Bowdoin College, he played for the California Golden Seals, Cleveland Barons and Colorado Rockies, and also represented the United States in the 1976 Canada Cup.

== Career statistics ==
=== Regular season and playoffs ===
			Regular season					Playoffs
Season	Team	League	GP	G	A	Pts	PIM	GP	G	A	Pts	PIM
1968–69	Boston Tech	HS-MA	—	—	—	—	—	—	—	—	—	—
1969–70	Boston Tech	HS-MA	—	—	—	—	—	—	—	—	—	—
1970–71	Bowdoin College	NCAA-III	21	14	12	26	—	—	—	—	—	—
1971–72	Bowdoin College	NCAA-III	15	7	14	21	—	—	—	—	—	—
1972–73	Bowdoin College	NCAA-III	21	13	21	34	—	—	—	—	—	—
1973–74	Bowdoin College	NCAA-III	21	18	20	38	—	—	—	—	—	—
1974–75	California Golden Seals	NHL	3	2	1	3	0	—	—	—	—	—
1974–75	Salt Lake Golden Eagles	CHL	64	26	26	52	101	9	5	3	8	11
1975–76	California Golden Seals	NHL	44	17	8	25	43	—	—	—	—	—
1975–76	Salt Lake Golden Eagles	CHL	30	12	14	26	57	—	—	—	—	—
1976–77	Cleveland Barons	NHL	25	4	4	8	20	—	—	—	—	—
1977–78	Colorado Rockies	NHL	38	5	13	18	19	2	0	1	1	2
1978–79	Binghamton Dusters	AHL	75	25	32	57	56	5	1	4	5	4
1979–80	Adirondack Red Wings	AHL	38	4	6	10	34	5	0	1	1	2
1979–80	Oklahoma City Stars	CHL	25	4	9	13	45	—	—	—	—	—
1980–81	HC Neuchâtel Young Sprinters	NLB	—	—	—	—	—	—	—	—	—	—
1980–81	Baltimore Clippers	EHL	7	3	1	4	0	—	—	—	—	—
1981–82	Cape Cod Buccaneers	ACHL	38	9	27	36	38	—	—	—	—	—
NHL totals			146	31	30	61	130	2	0	1	1	2

=== International ===
Year	Team	Event	GP	G	A	Pts	PIM
1976	United States	CC	5	2	0	2	0
Senior totals			5	2	0	2	0
