= Pete LoPresti =

American ice hockey goaltender (born 1954)

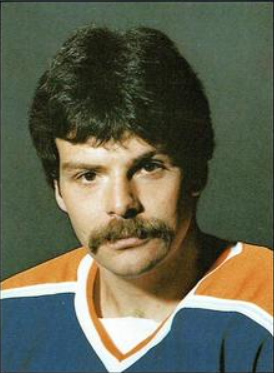
- LoPresti in 1980 photo
- Born: May 23, 1954 (age 71) Virginia, Minnesota, U.S.
- Height: 6 ft 1 in (185 cm)
- Weight: 200 lb (91 kg; 14 st 4 lb)
- Position: Goaltender
- Caught: Left
- Played for: Minnesota North Stars; Edmonton Oilers
- National team: United States
- NHL draft: 42nd overall, 1974; Minnesota North Stars
- WHA draft: 45th overall, 1974; Houston Aeros
- Playing career: 1974–1981

Peter Jon LoPresti (born May 23, 1954) is an American former professional ice hockey goaltender. He is the son of former National Hockey League (NHL) goaltender Sam LoPresti.

LoPresti started his NHL career with the Minnesota North Stars in 1974 after playing college ice hockey for the University of Denver, and became the NHL's youngest regular goaltender that season. He was also a member of the United States men's national team in the 1976 Canada Cup as well as the Ice Hockey World Championships in 1976 and 1978.

LoPresti lost his job as the North Stars' starting goaltender in 1978–79 to Gilles Meloche and retired for the first time after failing to make the Edmonton Oilers roster the following season. He would later briefly return to the Oilers for the 1980–81 NHL season before retiring for good.
