= Butch Williams =

American ice hockey player (born 1952)

- Born: September 11, 1952 (age 73) Duluth, Minnesota, U.S.A.
- Height: 5 ft 11 in (180 cm)
- Weight: 195 lb (88 kg; 13 st 13 lb)
- Position: Right wing
- Shot: Right
- Played for: St. Louis Blues; California Golden Seals; Edmonton Oilers
- National team: United States
- NHL draft: Undrafted
- Playing career: 1972–1978

Warren Milton "Butch" Williams (born September 11, 1952) is a retired professional ice hockey player who played 108 games in the National Hockey League in 1974–76. He played for the California Golden Seals and St. Louis Blues and also represented the United States in the 1976 Canada Cup. Williams finished his major league career in 1977 with the Edmonton Oilers of the World Hockey Association and also played for Team USA at the 1977 Ice Hockey World Championship.

He and his older brother Tom Williams were the first American brothers to play in the NHL.

From 2010 to 2013, for three seasons, Butch was the owner and general manager of the Duluth Clydesdales, a Junior A hockey club playing in the Superior International Junior Hockey League.

== Career statistics ==
=== Regular season and playoffs ===
			Regular season					Playoffs
Season	Team	League	GP	G	A	Pts	PIM	GP	G	A	Pts	PIM
1970–71	Oshawa Generals	OHA	53	5	21	26	43	—	—	—	—	—
1971–72	Oshawa Generals	OHA	23	4	9	13	51	—	—	—	—	—
1971–72	Niagara Falls Flyers	OHA	24	9	9	18	50	6	0	1	1	41
1972–73	Clinton Comets	EHL	54	22	42	64	129	—	—	—	—	—
1972–73	Denver Spurs	WHL	13	2	5	7	15	5	1	2	3	2
1973–74	Denver Spurs	WHL	35	13	11	24	86	—	—	—	—	—
1973–74	St. Louis Blues	NHL	31	3	10	13	6	—	—	—	—	—
1974–75	Denver Spurs	CHL	14	2	9	11	29	—	—	—	—	—
1974–75	California Golden Seals	NHL	63	11	21	32	118	—	—	—	—	—
1975–76	Salt Lake Golden Eagles	CHL	60	31	46	77	171	5	2	3	5	24
1975–76	California Golden Seals	NHL	14	0	4	4	7	—	—	—	—	—
1976–77	Rhode Island Reds	AHL	5	0	1	1	24	—	—	—	—	—
1976–77	Edmonton Oilers	WHA	29	3	10	13	16	—	—	—	—	—
WHA totals			29	3	10	13	16	—	—	—	—	—
NHL totals			108	14	35	49	131	—	—	—	—	—

=== International ===
Year	Team	Event	GP	G	A	Pts	PIM
1976	United States	CC	3	0	3	3	2
1977	United States	WC	10	4	4	8	22
Senior totals			13	4	7	11	24
