= Gerry O'Flaherty =

Canadian-American ice hockey player

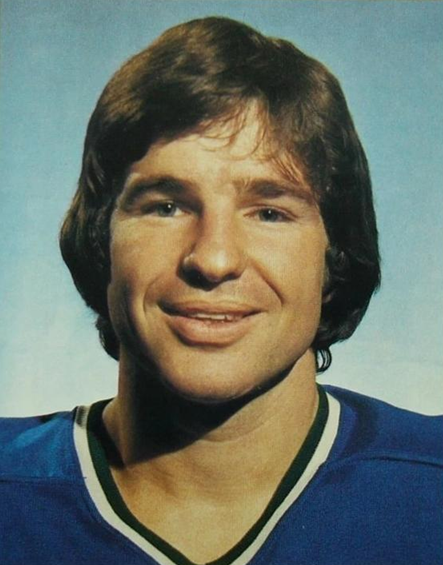
- O'Flaherty in 1976 photo
- Born: August 31, 1950 (age 75) Pittsburgh, Pennsylvania, USA
- Height: 5 ft 10 in (178 cm)
- Weight: 182 lb (83 kg; 13 st 0 lb)
- Position: Left wing
- Shot: Left
- Played for: Toronto Maple Leafs; Vancouver Canucks; Atlanta Flames
- National team: United States
- NHL draft: 36th overall, 1970; Toronto Maple Leafs
- Playing career: 1971–1979

Gerard Joseph O'Flaherty (born August 31, 1950) is a Canadian-American retired professional ice hockey player. During a playing career that lasted from 1971 to 1979 he played for the Toronto Maple Leafs, Vancouver Canucks, and Atlanta Flames of the National Hockey League, as well as time with the Tulsa Oilers of the minor Central Hockey League. Internationally O'Flaherty played for the United States at the inaugural 1976 Canada Cup.

== Playing career ==
Born in Pittsburgh, Pennsylvania where his father, John "Peanuts" O'Flaherty, played for the Pittsburgh Hornets, O'Flaherty later moved to Toronto, Ontario where he played in the MTHL with the North York Rangers. He was selected by the Toronto Maple Leafs in the 1970 NHL Amateur Draft and played a single year there before being claimed by the Vancouver Canucks during the 1972 NHL Intra-League Draft. While serving the Canucks O'Flaherty registered three consecutive 20-goal seasons and appeared in a total of 438 regular season games in 1971–1979. When he scored 25 goals in 1974–75, it was the most in a season by an American-born player, breaking the previous mark of 23, set by Tom Williams, in 1962–63. O'Flaherty's record was broken in 1978-79 when Tom Rowe scored 31 goals for the Washington Capitals.

== International play ==
O'Flaherty played for the United States at the inaugural 1976 Canada Cup. He had one assist in four games.

== Career statistics ==
=== Regular season and playoffs ===
			Regular season					Playoffs
Season	Team	League	GP	G	A	Pts	PIM	GP	G	A	Pts	PIM
1967–68	North York Rangers	MetJHL	36	19	24	43	13	—	—	—	—	—
1968–69	Kitchener Rangers	OHA	22	4	3	7	4	—	—	—	—	—
1969–70	Kitchener Rangers	OHA	54	40	38	78	30	6	6	6	12	8
1970–71	Tulsa Oilers	CHL	70	23	29	52	33	—	—	—	—	—
1971–72	Toronto Maple Leafs	NHL	2	0	0	0	0	—	—	—	—	—
1971–72	Tulsa Oilers	CHL	57	22	30	52	48	13	6	9	15	28
1972–73	Vancouver Canucks	NHL	78	13	17	30	29	—	—	—	—	—
1973–74	Vancouver Canucks	NHL	78	22	20	42	18	—	—	—	—	—
1974–75	Vancouver Canucks	NHL	80	25	17	42	37	5	2	2	4	6
1975–76	Vancouver Canucks	NHL	68	20	18	38	47	2	0	0	0	0
1976–77	Vancouver Canucks	NHL	72	12	12	24	20	—	—	—	—	—
1976–77	Tulsa Oilers	CHL	5	2	3	5	2	—	—	—	—	—
1977–78	Vancouver Canucks	NHL	59	6	11	17	15	—	—	—	—	—
1977–78	Tulsa Oilers	CHL	10	9	7	16	0	—	—	—	—	—
1978–79	Atlanta Flames	NHL	1	1	0	1	2	—	—	—	—	—
1978–79	Tulsa Oilers	CHL	38	18	24	42	18	—	—	—	—	—
1978–79	Nova Scotia Voyageurs	AHL	35	8	14	22	18	10	2	1	3	6
NHL totals			438	99	95	194	168	7	2	2	4	6

=== International ===
Year	Team	Event	GP	G	A	Pts	PIM
1976	United States	CC	4	0	1	1	0
Senior totals			4	0	1	1	0
