= Vladimír Dzurilla =

- Born: 2 August 1942 Bratislava, Slovakia
- Died: 27 July 1995 (aged 52) Düsseldorf, Germany
- Height: 5 ft 10 in (178 cm)
- Weight: 205 lb (93 kg; 14 st 9 lb)
- Position: Goaltender
- Caught: Left
- Played for: HC Slovan Bratislava; HC Plzeň; Kometa Brno; Augsburger Panther; SC Riessersee
- National team: Czechoslovakia
- Playing career: 1959–1982

Olympic medal record

Representing Czechoslovakia

Men's Ice hockey
Bronze medal – third place	1964 Innsbruck	Ice hockey
Silver medal – second place	1968 Grenoble	Ice hockey
Bronze medal – third place	1972 Sapporo	Ice hockey

Vladimír Dzurilla (2 August 1942 in Bratislava, Slovakia – 27 July 1995 in Düsseldorf, Germany) was a Slovak ice hockey goaltender playing for Czechoslovakia.

Dzurilla, a refrigerator repairman by profession, was goalie for the Czechoslovak national team for over 16 years, winning three gold, three silver and four bronze medals at world championships as well as one silver and two bronze Olympic medals. However, in most of these tournaments Dzurilla and Jiří Holeček were battling to be Czechoslovakia's top goaltender and each were given their share of games.

For North American fans, he is mostly known for stopping 29 shots in a 1-0 win over Canada in the 1976 Canada Cup (where the Czechoslovaks finished second).

Dzurilla was inducted into the International Ice Hockey Federation Hall of Fame in 1998. He suffered a fatal heart attack at his home in Düsseldorf, Germany, on 27 July 1995, only days before his 53rd birthday.
