= Seppo Repo =

Finnish ice hockey player

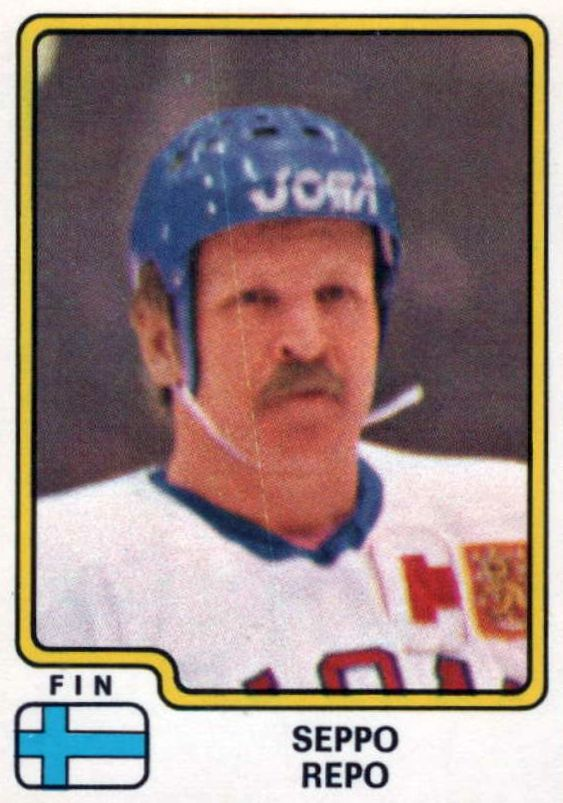
- Born: September 21, 1947 (age 78) Joensuu, Finland
- Height: 5 ft 10 in (178 cm)
- Weight: 181 lb (82 kg; 12 st 13 lb)
- Position: Centre
- Shot: Left
- Played for: SaPKo; Jokerit; Karhu-Kissat; HJK; TPS; Phoenix Roadrunners; Kokudo Keikaku; EHC 70 München
- National team: Finland
- Playing career: 1966–1989

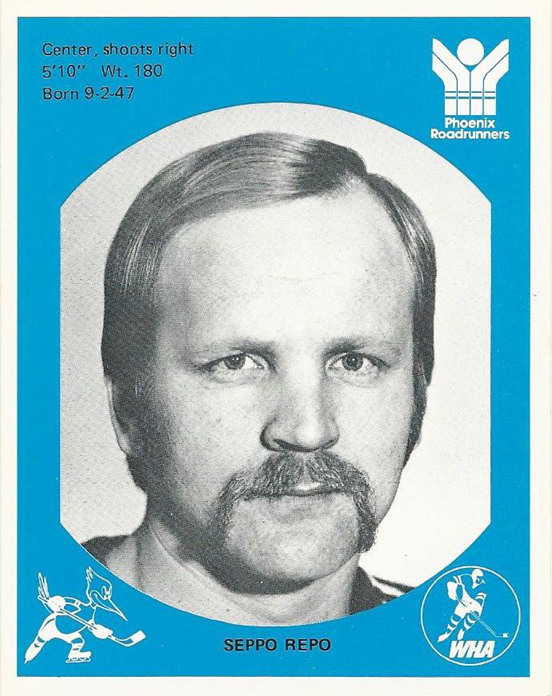
1976-77 card of Repo for Phoenix Roadrunners

Seppo Hannu Antero Repo (born September 21, 1947 in Joensuu, Finland) is a retired professional ice hockey player who played in the SM-liiga. He played for Jokerit, SaPKo, and TPS. He was inducted into the Finnish Hockey Hall of Fame in 1990.

He played one season in the WHA, spending the 1976-77 season with the Phoenix Roadrunners, playing alongside countrymen Pekka Rautakallio, Juhani Tamminen and Lauri Mononen. He was also part of the Finnish National Team that played one game that counted in the WHA's official standings during the 1978-79 season. He scored 29 goals and 60 points in 80 games in his one season with Phoenix.

== Career statistics ==
=== Regular season and playoffs ===
			Regular season					Playoffs
Season	Team	League	GP	G	A	Pts	PIM	GP	G	A	Pts	PIM
1970–71	Jokerit	SM-sarja	32	21	16	37	20	—	—	—	—	—
1971–72	Karhu-Kissat	SM–sarja	30	15	11	26	34	—	—	—	—	—
1972–73	HJK Helsinki	SM–sarja	35	23	11	34	47	—	—	—	—	—
1974–75	HC TPS	SM–sarja	36	37	16	53	98	—	—	—	—	—
1975–76	TPS Turku	SM–liiga	35	33	22	55	32	—	—	—	—	—
1976–77	Phoenix Roadrunners	WHA	80	29	31	60	10	—	—	—	—	—
1977–78	TPS Turku	SM–liiga	35	20	17	37	50	—	—	—	—	—
1980–81	Munich ESC	1.GBun	44	30	32	62	36	7	7	9	16	6
1981–82	TPS Turku	SM–liiga	36	14	12	26	35	—	—	—	—	—
1982–83	TPS Turku	SM–liiga	35	9	11	20	14	—	—	—	—	—
1985–86	KooKoo Kouvola	FinD1	42	29	36	65	14	—	—	—	—	—
WHA totals			80	29	31	60	10	—	—	—	—	—
