= Bohuslav Šťastný =

Czech ice hockey player

- Born: April 23, 1949 (age 77) Chotěboř, Czechoslovakia
- Height: 5 ft 11 in (180 cm)
- Weight: 183 lb (83 kg; 13 st 1 lb)
- Position: Left wing
- Shot: Left
- Played for: HC Pardubice
- National team: Czechoslovakia
- Playing career: 1967–1985
Medal record
Men's ice hockey
Representing Czechoslovakia
Olympic Games
Silver medal – second place	1976 Innsbruck	Ice hockey
Bronze medal – third place	1972 Sapporo	Ice hockey

Bohuslav Šťastný (born 23 April 1949) is a Czech retired professional ice hockey player. He played in the Czechoslovak Extraliga for HC Pardubice (now part of the Czech Extraliga). He was a member of the Czechoslovak 1976 Canada Cup team, and was a silver medalist at the 1976 Winter Olympics, and a bronze medalist at the 1972 Winter Olympics.
