= Pertti Koivulahti =

Finnish ice hockey player (1951–2019)

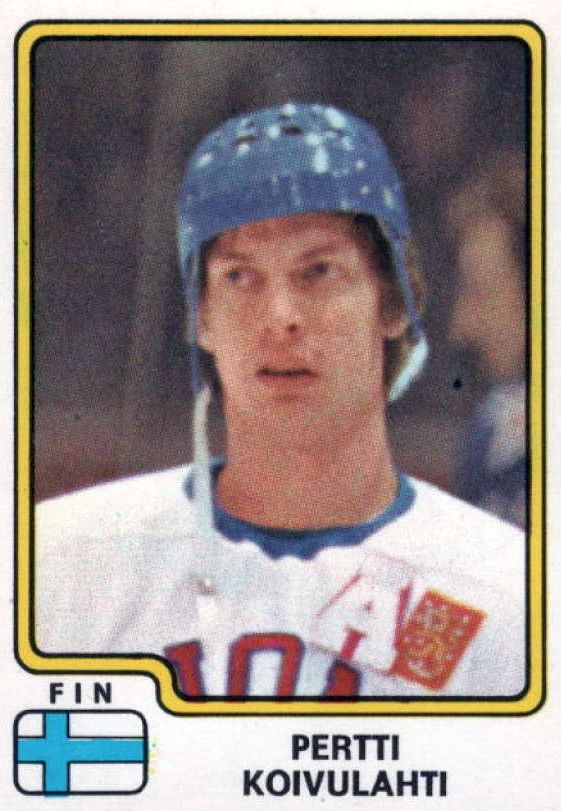

Personal information
- Nationality: Finnish

Sport
- Sport: Ice hockey

Pertti Antero Koivulahti (7 June 1951 – 11 March 2019) was a professional ice hockey player who played in the SM-liiga. Born in Tampere, Finland, he played for Tappara. He was inducted into the Finnish Hockey Hall of Fame in 1992.

He died in Tampere on 11 March 2019.
