= Heikki Riihiranta =

Finnish ice hockey player (born 1948)

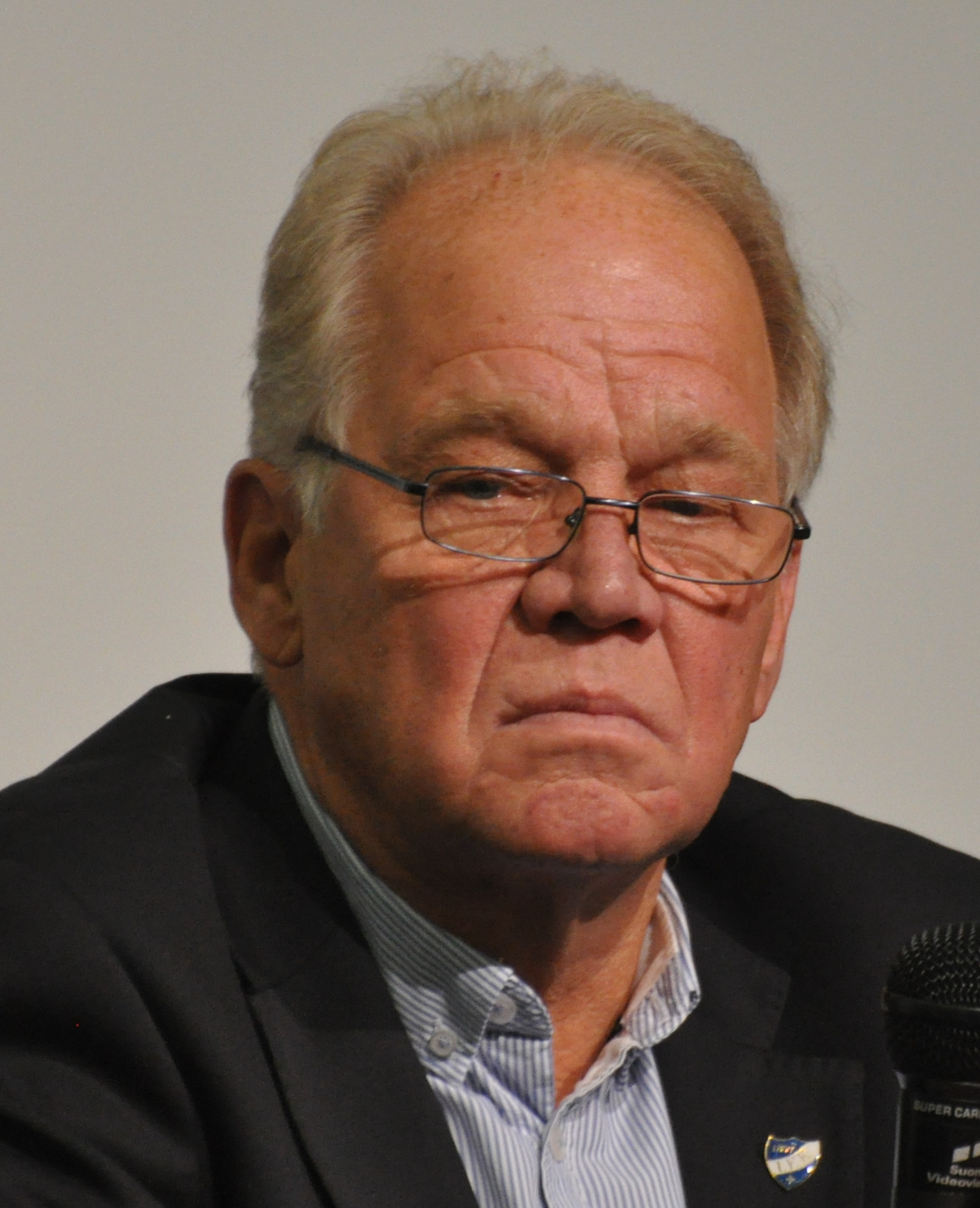
- Riihiranta at Helsinki Book Fair, 2016.
- Born: October 4, 1948 (age 77) Helsinki, FIN
- Height: 5 ft 10 in (178 cm)
- Weight: 185 lb (84 kg; 13 st 3 lb)
- Position: Defence
- Shot: Left
- Played for: SM-liiga; HIFK; WHA; Winnipeg Jets
- National team: Finland
- Playing career: 1967–1983

Heikki "Hexi" Riihiranta (born October 4, 1948 in Helsinki, Finland) is a retired professional ice hockey player who played in the SM-liiga and World Hockey Association.

== Playing career ==
=== Career in Finland ===
Riihiranta started out his career as a Forward in Helsinki club HIFK but was moved to play Defence by then HIFK Player-Coach and former NHL'er Carl Brewer.

Riihiranta had a good career in Finland and was one of the premier players for the National Team at his time.

=== Career in WHA ===
Heikki Riihiranta was one of the first Finns move to play in North America.

Riihiranta played for 3 full seasons in a Canadian WHA team, Winnipeg Jets, and won the Avco World Trophy with them in 1976.

After his retirement as a player in 1983, he was inducted into the Finnish Hockey Hall of Fame in 1991 for his achievements as a player.

== Post-playing career ==
In 1993, Riihiranta was named as the Team Manager for Finnish National Ice Hockey Team. During his time, Riihiranta worked with three different head coaching staffs (Pentti Matikainen, Curt Lindström and Hannu Aravirta). He was part of the staff when Finland won the World Championships over Sweden in 1995. Riihiranta retired from his position after the 2003 Ice Hockey World Championships.

== Career statistics ==
=== Regular season and playoffs ===
			Regular season					Playoffs
Season	Team	League	GP	G	A	Pts	PIM	GP	G	A	Pts	PIM
1970–71	HIFK Helsinki	SM-sarja	30	2	15	17	29	—	—	—	—	—
1971–72	HIFK Helsinki	SM–sarja	32	1	8	9	32	—	—	—	—	—
1972–73	HIFK Helsinki	SM–sarja	35	3	8	11	63	—	—	—	—	—
1974–75	Winnipeg Jets	WHA	64	8	14	22	30	—	—	—	—	—
1975–76	Winnipeg Jets	WHA	70	1	8	9	26	4	0	4	4	6
1976–77	Winnipeg Jets	WHA	53	1	16	17	28	—	—	—	—	—
1977–78	HIFK Helsinki	SM–liiga	32	5	12	17	0	—	—	—	—	—
1978–79	HIFK Helsinki	SM–liiga	36	5	8	13	82	—	—	—	—	—
1979–80	HIFK Helsinki	SM–liiga	32	5	6	11	41	7	3	1	4	12
1980–81	HIFK Helsinki	SM–liiga	35	4	8	12	54	7	2	0	21	12
1981–82	HIFK Helsinki	SM–liiga	31	3	4	7	71	—	—	—	—	—
1982–83	HIFK Helsinki	SM–liiga	33	0	4	4	17	—	—	—	—	—
WHA totals			187	10	38	48	84	4	0	4	4	6

Preceded by Kimmo Heino	Captain of HIFK; 1977–83	Succeeded by Matti Hagman
