= Josef Augusta (ice hockey) =

Czechoslovak ice hockey player and coach

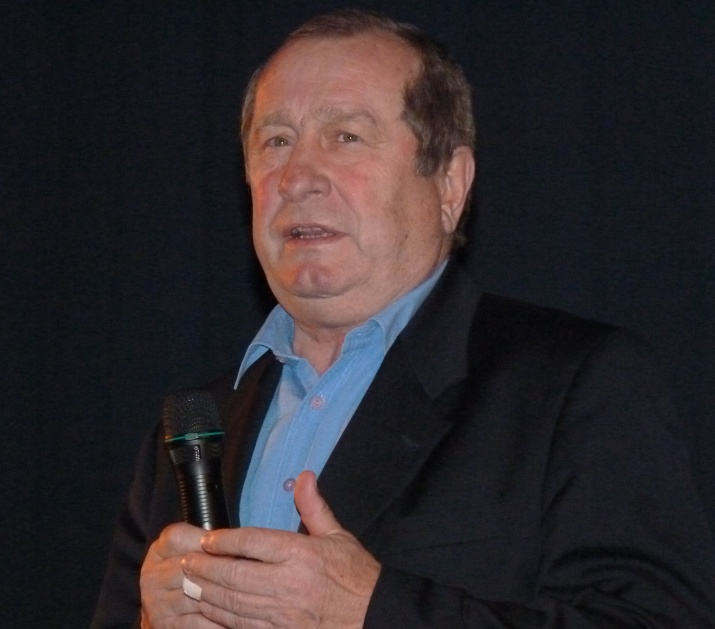
- Augusta in 2012

Personal information
- Born: 24 November 1946 Havlíčkův Brod, Czechoslovakia
- Died: 16 February 2017 (aged 70) Jihlava, Czech Republic
Medal record
Men's ice hockey
Representing Czechoslovakia
Olympic Games
Silver medal – second place	1976 Innsbruck	Team

Josef Augusta (24 November 1946 in Havlíčkův Brod – 16 February 2017 in Jihlava) was a Czechoslovak ice hockey player and coach, and a silver medalist from the 1976 Winter Olympics. He was the father of former hockey player Patrik Augusta.

Augusta was head coach of the Czech national hockey team at the 2002 Winter Olympics and the World Championships in 2000, 2001 and 2002. The Czech team won gold medals in 2000 and 2001. He died from pancreatic cancer on 16 February 2017 at the age of 70.
