= Matti Rautiainen =

Finnish ice hockey player

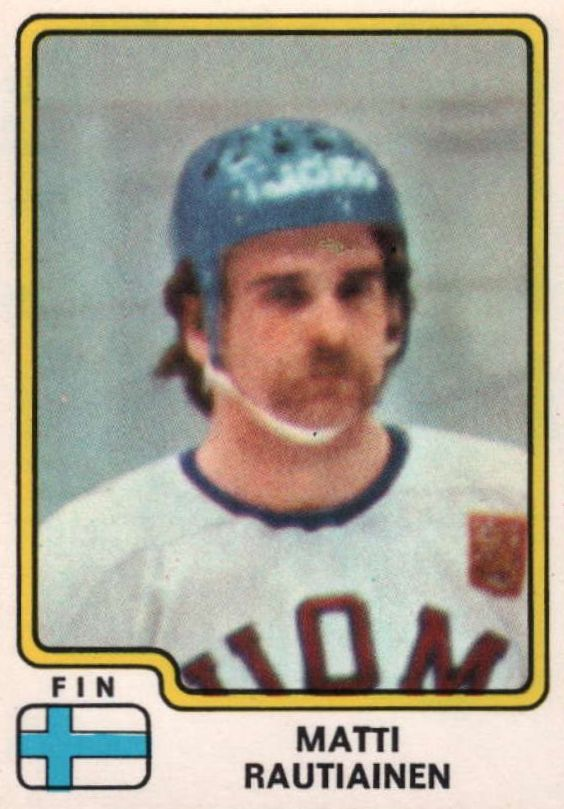

Personal information
- Nationality: Finnish
- Born: 7 October 1955 (age 69); Tampere, Finland

Sport
- Sport: Ice hockey

Matti Rautiainen (born 7 October 1955) is a Finnish ice hockey player. He competed in the men's tournament at the 1976 Winter Olympics.
