= Antti Leppänen =

Finnish ice hockey player (1947–2015)

Antti Kalervo Leppänen (November 23, 1947 – August 5, 2015) was a professional ice hockey goaltender who played in the SM-liiga. Born in Tampere, he played for Tappara. He was inducted into the Finnish Hockey Hall of Fame in 1990.
