= 1974 World Junior Ice Hockey Championships =

1974 IIHF World Junior Championship
Tournament details
- Host country: Soviet Union
- Venue: 1 (in 1 host city)
- Dates: December 27, 1973 – January 6, 1974
- Teams: 6

Final positions
- Champions: Soviet Union
- Runners-up: Finland
- Third place: Canada
- Fourth place: Sweden

Tournament statistics
- Games played: 15
- Goals scored: 135 (9 per game)
- Scoring leader: (Sweden) Roland Eriksson (9 points)

The 1974 World Junior Ice Hockey Championships were held in Leningrad, Soviet Union between December 27, 1973, and January 6, 1974. The host Soviet team won the tournament with a perfect 5–0 record. This was the first edition of the Ice Hockey World Junior Championship, but the results are not included in official IIHF records. Canada was represented by a club team, the Peterborough Petes, while the other five nations were represented by teams of their top under-20 players.

== Final standings ==
The tournament was a round-robin format, with each team playing each of the other five teams once each.

Pos	Team	Pld	W	L	D	GF	GA	GD	Pts
1	Soviet Union	5	5	0	0	36	12	+24	10
2	Finland	5	3	2	0	21	23	−2	6
3	Canada	5	3	2	0	17	23	−6	6
4	Sweden	5	2	3	0	32	21	+11	4
5	United States	5	1	4	0	10	32	−22	2
6	Czechoslovakia	5	1	4	0	19	24	−5	2

Source: Hockey Canada

== Results ==
Czechoslovakia	6 – 4 (3–1, 1–2, 2–1)	Sweden

Canada	5 – 4 (1–1, 1–2, 3–1)	United States

Soviet Union	6 – 2 (1–1, 3–1, 2–0)	Finland

Sweden	9 – 4 (1–2, 6–2, 2–0)	Finland

United States	1 – 11 (0–6, 1–1, 0–4)	Sweden

Soviet Union	7 – 5 (1–0, 6–2, 0–3)	Czechoslovakia

Finland	4 – 3 (2–1, 0–2, 2–0)	Canada

Soviet Union	5 – 4 (2–2, 2–2, 1–0)	Sweden

Finland	5 – 1 (2–0, 2–0, 1–1)	United States

Canada	4 – 2 (2–0, 1–1, 1–1)	Czechoslovakia

Finland	6 – 4 (4–1, 1–2, 1–1)	Czechoslovakia

Canada	5 – 4 (1–2, 1–1, 3–1)	Sweden

Soviet Union	9 – 1 (3–0, 1–1, 5–0)	United States

United States	3 – 2 (0–1, 2–1, 1–0)	Czechoslovakia

Soviet Union	9 – 0 (1–0, 3–0, 5–0)	Canada

== Scoring leaders ==
Rank	Player	Country	G	A	Pts
1	Roland Eriksson	Sweden	5	4	9
2	Viktor Khatulev	Soviet Union	3	6	9
3	Edmunds Vasiljevs	Soviet Union	7	1	8
3	Mats Ulander	Sweden	7	1	8
5	Boris Aleksandrov	Soviet Union	6	1	7
6	Thomas Gradin	Sweden	4	3	7
7	Doug Jarvis	Canada	2	5	7
8	Viktor Vakhrushev	Soviet Union	1	6	7
9	Bo Berglund	Sweden	2	4	6
10	Vladimir Gostyuzhev	Soviet Union	1	5	6

== Tournament awards ==
	Best Players	All-Star Team
Goaltender	(Canada) Frank Salive	(Finland) Tapio Virhimo
Defencemen	(Soviet Union) Viktor Kucherenko	(Canada) Jim Turkiewicz (Canada) Paul McIntosh
Forwards	(Sweden) Mats Ulander	(Sweden) Thomas Gradin (Sweden) Roland Eriksson (Finland) Ismo Villa
