= Oldřich Machač =

Czech ice hockey player

Personal information
- Born: 18 April 1946 Prostějov
- Died: 10 August 2011 (aged 65) Brno
Medal record
Men's ice hockey
Representing Czechoslovakia
Olympic Games
Silver medal – second place	1968 Grenoble	Team
Silver medal – second place	1976 Innsbruck	Team
Bronze medal – third place	1972 Sapporo	Team

Oldřich Machač (18 April 1946 in Prostějov – 10 August 2011 in Brno) was a Czech ice hockey player who played in the Czechoslovak Extraliga. He won three medals in three Winter Olympic games. He was inducted into the International Ice Hockey Federation Hall of Fame in 1999.
