= Juhani Tamminen =

Finnish ice hockey player

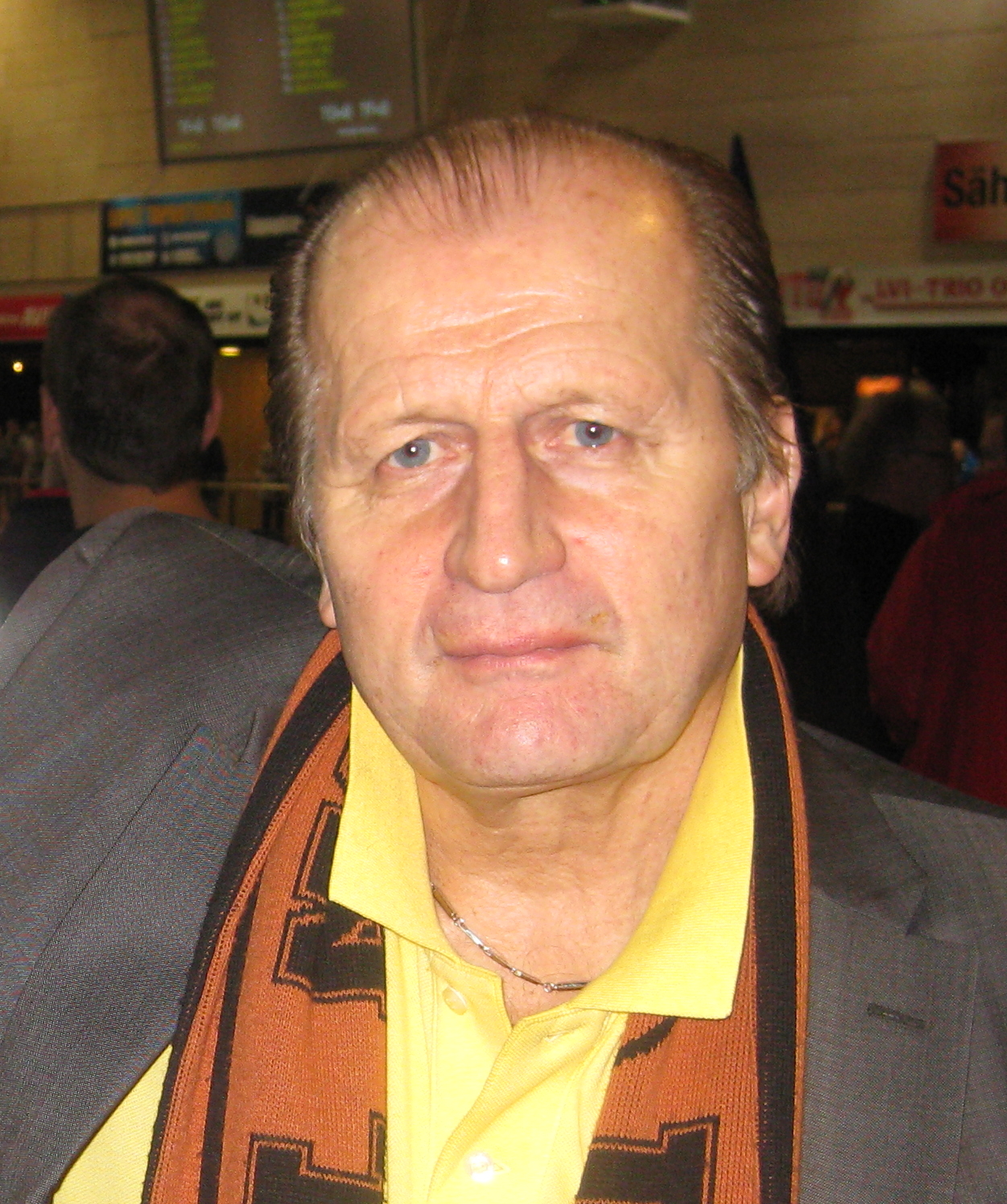
- Born: May 26, 1950 (age 76) Turku, Finland
- Height: 5 ft 10 in (178 cm)
- Weight: 185 lb (84 kg; 13 st 3 lb)
- Position: Left wing
- Shot: Left
- Played for: WHA; Cleveland Crusaders; Phoenix Roadrunners; CHL; Oklahoma City Blazers; SM-liiga; TPS; HJK; HIFK; JIHL; Kokudo Keikaku; Nationalliga B EHC Visp
- Playing career: 1969–1982

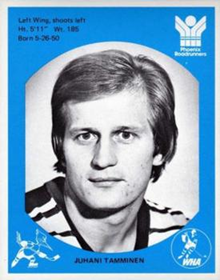
1976 card of Tamminen for Phoenix Roadrunners

Manu Juhani Tamminen (born May 26, 1950) is a Finnish retired professional ice hockey player who played in the SM-liiga and World Hockey Association. He played for TPS, HJK, HIFK, Cleveland Crusaders, and Phoenix Roadrunners. He represented Finland at the 1976 Canada Cup. He was inducted into the Finnish Hockey Hall of Fame in 1991.

Tamminen's post playing career has included coaching in Finland, Sweden, Switzerland and Japan, as well as various television sports commentator positions. Tamminen has also coached Switzerland's and France's national ice hockey A-group.

== Coaching career ==
- TPS 1985–1988, SM-liiga. Rankings: Fourth, Fourth and Fifth.
- HC Sierre 1988–1990, On the Swiss B-series.
- HC Sierre 1990–1991, On the Swiss A-series. Ranking 9/10.
- Switzerland men's B-national ice hockey team 1989–1990.
- Switzerland men's national ice hockey team 1991–1992.
- IF Sundsvall Hockey/Timrå IK 1992–1993, "North Fortsättningsserien" (The third highest league in Sweden).
- TUTO Hockey, I-Divisioona 1993–1994 (the team rose at the end of the season in to SM-liiga).
- France men's national ice hockey team 1994–1997.
- Ässät, SM-liiga 1997–1998.
- Oulun Kärpät 1998–2000, I-Divisioona.Kärpät beat Pelicans in the qualifiers at the end of the 1999–2000 season were promoted to the SM-Liiga for the 2000–2001.
- Oulun Kärpät 2000–2001, SM-liiga. Released mid-season.
- Not coaching 2001–2003 (He served as Managing Director of Ässät).
- Vaasan Sport 2004–2005, Mestis. During the 2004–2005 season, Sport lost the Mestis finals to KalPa with a 0–3 defeat. During the 2005–2006 season, Tamminen resigned in December and moved to Switzerland.
- Zürich Lions 2005–2006, National League (ice hockey) (released from missions during the qualifying Relegation).
- Vaasan Sport 2007–2010, Mestis. Replaced coach Mikko Manner in December 2007. Tamminen went on sick leave due to burnout at the end of January 2010.
- TUTO Hockey, Mestis 2012–2013.

== Career statistics ==
=== Regular season and playoffs ===
			Regular season					Playoffs
Season	Team	League	GP	G	A	Pts	PIM	GP	G	A	Pts	PIM
1970–71	HJK Helsinki	SM-sarja	20	7	5	12	4	—	—	—	—	—
1971–72	HJK Helsinki	SM-sarja	32	22	18	40	10	—	—	—	—	—
1972–73	HIFK Helsinki	SM-sarja	36	24	17	41	25	—	—	—	—	—
1974–75	HIFK Helsinki	SM-sarja	36	17	36	53	26	—	—	—	—	—
1975–76	Cleveland Crusaders	WHA	65	7	14	21	0	1	0	0	0	0
1976–77	Oklahoma City Blazers	CHL	9	2	3	5	0	—	—	—	—	—
1976–77	Phoenix Roadrunners	WHA	65	10	29	39	22	—	—	—	—	—
1977–78	TPS Turku	SM-liiga	36	20	27	47	25	—	—	—	—	—
1978–79	TPS Turku	SM-liiga	36	19	15	34	29	—	—	—	—	—
1980–81	TPS Turku	SM-liiga	35	21	27	48	22	7	5	3	8	10
1981–82	TPS Turku	SM-liiga	36	11	16	27	18	—	—	—	—	—
1982–83	TPS Turku	SM-liiga	13	4	5	9	6	—	—	—	—	—
WHA totals			130	17	43	60	22	1	0	0	0	0
