= Harri Linnonmaa =

Finnish ice hockey player (born 1946)

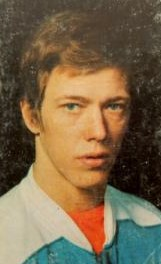
Image of LINNONMAA, Harri

Harri Lauri Linnonmaa (born July 30, 1946 in Helsinki) is a Finnish retired professional ice hockey player who played in the SM-liiga. He played for HJK and HIFK. He was inducted into the Finnish Hockey Hall of Fame in 1991.
