= Jiří Holeček =

Czech ice hockey player

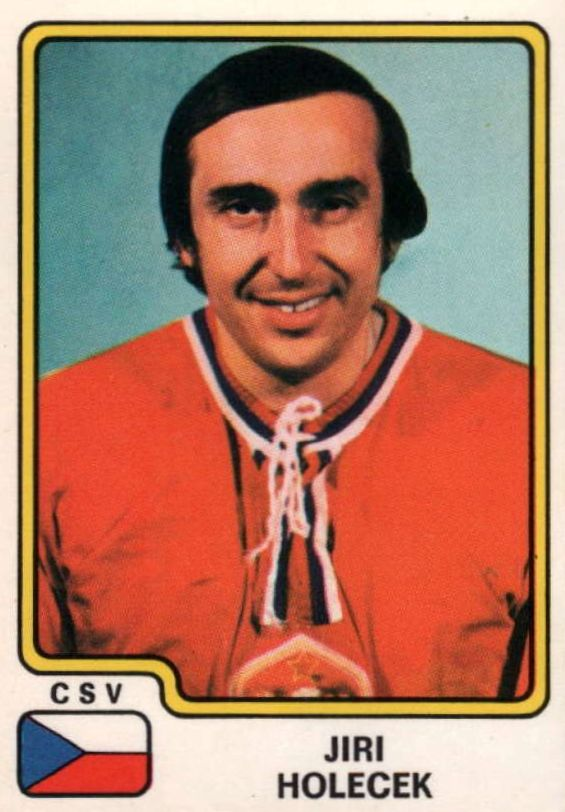
- Born: March 18, 1944 (age 82) Prague, Bohemia and Moravia
- Height: 5 ft 11 in (180 cm)
- Weight: 163 lb (74 kg; 11 st 9 lb)
- Position: Goaltender
- Played for: HC Košice; HC Sparta Praha
- National team: Czechoslovakia
- Playing career: 1964–1981
Medal record
Men's ice hockey
Representing Czechoslovakia
Olympic Games
Silver medal – second place	1976 Innsbruck	Team
Bronze medal – third place	1972 Sapporo	Team

Jiří Holeček (born March 18, 1944) is a Czech professional ice hockey coach and former player. Holeček played in the Czechoslovak Elite League from 1964 to 1979, and on the Czechoslovak national team for many years.

After joining the military he participated in the hockey camp of Dukla Jihlava, but coming from an insignificant Slávia team at the time, he did not make it higher than the number three goaltender and was loaned to HC Košice in the eastern part of the country. After starting his career on the Košice team in 1963–64, Holecek played there for 10 years until he joined Sparta Prague for the 1973/1974 season. Holeček played 488 league games, and despite being awarded the Czechoslovak Golden Hockey Stick award for the best player in 1974, he never won the league title.

Holeček played 164 games for the national team, including ten World Championships (leading the team to gold in 1972, 1976, and 1977), being named the best goaltender five times. He played at the 1972 and 1976 Olympics and the 1976 Canada Cup.

Holeček finished his playing career in 1981 in West Germany. In 1980s he worked as a coach of the Czechoslovak national ice hockey team goaltenders, and later worked as goalie coach for HC Hvězda Praha. He was inducted into the IIHF Hall of Fame in 1998.

Awards
Preceded by Vladimír Martinec	Golden Hockey Stick; 1974	Succeeded by Vladimír Martinec
