= 1971 Ice Hockey World Championships =

1971 edition of the World Ice Hockey Championships

Tournament details
- Host country: Switzerland
- Dates: 19 March – 3 April
- Teams: 6

Final positions
- Champions: Soviet Union (11th title)
- Runners-up: Czechoslovakia
- Third place: Sweden
- Fourth place: Finland

Tournament statistics
- Games played: 30
- Goals scored: 234 (7.8 per game)
- Attendance: 190,251 (6,342 per game)
- Scoring leader: (Soviet Union) Anatoli Firsov 19 points

The 1971 Ice Hockey World Championships was the 38th edition of the Ice Hockey World Championships, which also doubled as the 49th European ice hockey championships. The Pool A, Pool B and Pool C tournaments were hosted by the following nations:

Pool A in Switzerland (Bern and Geneva), 19 March – 3 April 1971
Pool B in Switzerland (Bern, Geneva, La Chaux-de-Fonds and Lyss), 5–14 March 1971
Pool C in the Netherlands, 26 February – 7 March 1971

A record 22 nations participated in the tournaments. The Pool A tournament featured the top six nations, playing a double round-robin tournament for the World Championship. Teams #7-#14 participated in the Pool B tournament with the winner qualifying for the 1972 Pool A championship while the two last-place teams were demoted to the 1972 Pool C tournament. The bottom eight teams participated in the Pool C tournament with the top two teams qualifying for the 1972 Pool B tournament.

The Soviet Union won its ninth consecutive (a record which has not been broken), and 11th overall, title.

This was the last international tournament in which goaltenders did not have to wear face masks.

== Qualifying round (A/B) ==
The Pool A tournament was held in Bern and Geneva, Switzerland, from 19 March to 3 April 1971. The East German team declined to participate. West Germany participated instead after beating Poland in two qualifying games arranged in November 1970 for the vacant slot. West Germany had placed second in last year's Pool B, while Poland had finished 6th in last year's Pool A.

West Germany – Poland 6:3 (2:0, 3:2, 1:1)

8 November 1970 – Munich

Poland – West Germany 4:4 (2:0, 2:0, 0:4)

12 November 1970 – Łódź

== World Championship Group A (Switzerland) ==
38.	World Championships	URS	TCH	SWE	FIN	GER	USA	W	T	L	GF–GA	Pts.
1.	Soviet Union	***	3:3*	8:0*	8:1*	11:2*	10:2*	8	1	1	77:24	17
2.	Czechoslovakia	5:2	***	5:6*	5:0*	9:1*	1:5*	7	1	2	44:20	15
3.	Sweden	3:6	1:3	***	1:1*	7:2*	4:2*	5	1	4	29:33	11
4.	Finland	1:10	2:4	1:2	***	4:3*	7:4*	4	1	5	31:42	9
5.	West Germany	2:12	0:4	2:1	2:7	***	7:2*	2	0	8	22:62	4
6.	United States	5:7	0:5	3:4	3:7	5:1	***	2	0	8	31:53	4

For the ninth straight year, the Soviet Union won the world championship, although Czechoslovakia won the 49th European championship as the Czech opening loss against the Americans did not count in the European standings. Team USA was demoted to the 1972 Pool B tournament. The Americans came into their final game needing to win by five goals, and led five to zero in the third period, but the Germans scored the only goal of the frame claiming the advantage in the tie-breaker for 5th place.

49.	European Championships	TCH	URS	SWE	FIN	GER	W	T	L	GF–GA	Pts.
1.	Czechoslovakia	***	5:2*	5:6*	5:0*	9:1*	6	1	1	38:15	13
2.	Soviet Union	3:3	***	8:0*	8:1*	11:2*	6	1	1	60:17	13
3.	Sweden	3:6	1:3	***	1:1*	7:2*	3	1	4	21:28	7
4.	Finland	1:10	2:4	1:2	***	4:3*	2	1	5	17:35	5
5.	West Germany	2:12	0:4	2:1	2:7	***	1	0	7	14:55	2

Czechoslovakia – United States 1:5 (1:3, 0:1, 0:1)

19 March 1971 – Bern
Goalscorers: Nedomanský – Riutta 2, Konik, Patrick, Boucha.
Referees: Dahlberg (SWE), Ehrensperger (SUI)

Soviet Union – West Germany 11:2 (2:2, 3:0, 6:0)

19 March 1971 – Bern
Goalscorers: Mišakov 3, Petrov 2, Vikulov 2, Firsov, Malcev, Zimin, Martiňuk – Alois Schloder, Philipp.

United States – Sweden 2:4 (1:1, 1:1, 0:2)

20 March 1971 – Bern
Goalscorers: Boucha, Falkman – Wickberg 2, Sterner, Lindberg

West Germany – Finland 3:4 (1:2, 1:1, 1:1)

20 March 1971 – Bern
Goalscorers: Hanig, Kuhn, Philipp – Oksanen 2, Ketola, Isaksson.

Czechoslovakia – Sweden 5:6 (1:2, 2:0, 2:4)

21 March 1971 – Bern
Goalscorers: Hlinka 3, Nedomanský, Panchártek – Lundström 2, Hammarström, Nilsson, Norlander, Sterner.
Referees: Bader (GER), Ehrensperger (SUI)

Finland – Soviet Union 1:8 (1:1, 0:2, 0:5)

21 March 1971 – Bern
Goalscorers: Koskela – Malcev 2, Petrov 2, Davydov, Vikulov, Firsov, Michajlov.

Czechoslovakia – West Germany 9:1 (1:0, 3:1, 5:0)

22 March 1971 – Bern
Goalscorers: B. Šťastný 2, Kochta, Farda, Černý, Martinec, Horešovský, Jiří Holík, Pospíšil – Eimansberger.
Referees: Gagnon (USA), Sillankorva (FIN)

Soviet Union – United States 10:2 (1:0, 7:1, 2:1)

22 March 1971 – Bern
Goalscorers: Vikulov 2, Staršinov 2, Mišakov 2, Lutčenko, Firsov, Malcev, Charlamov – Sheehy, Christiansen.

West Germany – Sweden 2:7 (0:3, 1:2, 1:2)

23 March 1971 – Bern
Goalscorers: Alois Schloder, Philipp – Nordlander, Abrahamsson, Wickberg, Lundström, Lindberg, Stig-Göran Johansson, Hammarchtröm.

United States – Finland 4:7 (0:2, 3:3, 1:2)

23 March 1971 – Bern
Goalscorers: Gambucci 2, McElmury, Patrick – Marjamäki, Esa Peltonen, Vehmanen, Linnonmaa, Lindström, Oksanen, Koskela.

Finland – Sweden 1:1 (1:0, 0:0, 0:1)

24 March 1971 – Bern
Goalscorers: Ketola – Nordlander.

Czechoslovakia – Soviet Union 3:3 (1:1, 1:1, 1:1)

24 March 1971 – Bern
Goalscorers: Novák, Nedomanský, Kochta – Martyňuk, Firsov, Petrov.
Referees: Wycsik (POL), Ehrensperger (SUI)

United States – West Germany 2:7 (0:2, 1:3, 1:2)

25 March 1971 – Bern
Goalscorers: Christiansen, Boucha – Hofherr 2, Philipp 2, Völk, Hanig, Kuhn.

Sweden – Soviet Union 0:8 (0:4, 0:1, 0:3)

26 March 1971 – Bern
Goalscorers: Firsov 4, Michajlov 2, Petrov, Martiňuk.

Czechoslovakia – Finland 5:0 (0:0, 3:0, 2:0)

26 March 1971 – Bern
Goalscorers: Farda, Novák, Nedomanský, Kochta, Jiří Holík.
Referees: Bader (GER), Dämmerich (GDR)

Czechoslovakia – United States 5:0 (0:0, 3:0, 2:0)

27 March 1971 – Geneva
Goalscorers: Černý, Pospíšil, Bubla, Novák, Farda.
Referees: Karandin (URS), Gerber (SUI)

West Germany – Soviet Union 2:12 (1:1, 0:7, 1:4)

27 March 1971 – Geneva
Goalscorers: Alois Schloder, Modes – Lutčenko, Vikulov, Malcev 2, Firsov, Charlamov 2, Michajlov, Zimin, Šadrin 3.

Sweden – United States 4:3 (1:0, 1:3, 2:0)

28 March 1971 – Geneva
Goalscorers: Lundström 2, Nilsson, Palmqvist – Gambucci 2, Boucha.

Finland – West Germany 7:2 (3:0, 0:1, 4:1)

28 March 1971 – Geneva
Goalscorers: Repo, Järn, Erkki Mononen, Murto, Lauri Mononen, Marjamäki, Vehmanen – Bernd Kuhn, Egger.

Soviet Union – Finland 10:1 (5:1, 1:0, 4:0)

29 March 1971 – Geneva
Goalscorers: Malcev 2, Michajlov, Petrov, Martiňuk, Staršinov, Ragulin, Firsov, Šadrin 2 – Koskela.

Czechoslovakia – Sweden 3:1 (1:0, 1:0, 1:1)

29 March 1971 – Geneva
Goalscorers: Černý, Suchý, Kochta – Bergman.
Referees: Karandin (URS), Ehrenberger (SUI)

Czechoslovakia – West Germany 4:0 (1:0, 1:0, 2:0)

30 March 1971 – Geneva
Goalscorers: Černý 2, Nedomanský, Martinec.
Referees: Sillankorva (FIN), Gerber (SUI)

United States – Soviet Union 5:7 (1:1, 2:5, 2:1)

30 March 1971 – Geneva
Goalscorers: Gambucci 2, Christiansen, Mellor, Boucha – Romiševskij, Malcev, Kuzkin, Michajlov, Martiňuk, Šadrin, Mišakov.

Sweden – West Germany 1:2 (1:0, 0:2, 0:0)

31 March 1971 – Geneva
Goalscorers: Palmqvist – Schneitberger, Hanig.

Finland – United States 7:3 (1:1, 3:1, 3:1)

31 March 1971 – Geneva
Goalscorers: Ketola 3, Koskela 2, Luojola, Oksanen – D.Ross, McElmury, Boucha.

Sweden – Finland 2:1 (0:0, 2:0, 0:1)

1 April 1971 – Geneva
Goalscorers: Svedberg, Pettersson – Koskela.

Czechoslovakia – Soviet Union 5:2 (1:1, 1:1, 3:0)

1 April 1971 – Geneva
Goalscorers: Nedomanský, Suchý, Horešovský, B. Šťastný, Farda – Malcev, Charlamov.
Referees: Wycisk (POL), Ehrensperger (SUI)

West Germany – United States 1:5 (0:1, 0:4, 1:0)

2 April 1971 – Geneva
Goalscorers: Hofherr – Gambucci, Patrick, Boucha, Ahearn, Christiansen.

Czechoslovakia – Finland 4:2 (2:1, 1:1, 1:0)

3 April 1971 – Geneva
Goalscorers: Nedomanský 2, B. Šťastný, Hlinka – Murto, Linnonmaa.
Referees: Wycisk (POL), Ehrensperger (SUI)

Soviet Union – Sweden 6:3 (2:1, 0:2, 4:0)

3 April 1971 – Geneva
Goalscorers: Firsov, Petrov, Michajlov, Lutčenko, Charlamov, Kuzkin – Håkan Wickberg, Tord Lundström, Håkan Pettersson.

== Pool A statistics and team rosters ==
	Scoring leaders	Goals	Assists	Points
1.	(Soviet Union) Anatoli Firsov	10	9	19
2.	(Soviet Union) Valeri Kharlamov	5	12	17
3.	(Soviet Union) Alexander Maltsev	10	6	16
4.	(Soviet Union) Vladimir Petrov	8	3	11
5.	(Soviet Union) Boris Mikhailov	7	3	10
5.	(United States) Gary Gambucci	7	3	10

1. Soviet Union
Goalkeepers: Viktor Konovalenko, Vladislav Tretiak.
Defencemen: Vladimir Lutchenko, Alexander Ragulin, Vitali Davydov, Viktor Kuzkin, Igor Romishevsky, Yuri Lyapkin, Gennadiy Tsygankov.
Forwards: Boris Mikhailov, Vladimir Petrov, Valeri Kharlamov, Vladimir Vikulov, Alexander Maltsev, Anatoli Firsov, Alexander Martynyuk, Yevgeni Mishakov, Vyacheslav Starshinov, Vladimir Shadrin, Yevgeni Zimin.
Coaches: Arkady Chernyshev, Anatoly Tarasov.

2. Czechoslovakia
Goalkeepers: Jiří Holeček, Marcel Sakač.
Defencemen: Jan Suchý, František Pospíšil, Oldřich Machač, František Panchártek, Josef Horešovský, Rudolf Tajcnár, Jiří Bubla.
Forwards: Jan Havel, Václav Nedomanský, Jiří Holík, Eduard Novák, Richard Farda, Josef Černý, Vladimír Martinec, Ivan Hlinka, Bohuslav Šťastný, Jiří Kochta, Bedřich Brunclík.
Coaches: Jaroslav Pitner, Vladimír Kostka.

3. Sweden
Goalkeepers: Christer Abrahamsson, Leif Holmqvist, William Löfqvist.
Defencemen: Arne Carlsson, Lennart Svedberg, Thommy Abrahamsson, Bert-Ola Nordlander, Thommie Bergman, Kjell-Rune Milton, Gunnar Andersson.
Forwards: Inge Hammarström, Stig-Göran Johansson, Stefan Karlsson, Hans Lindberg, Tord Lundström, Lars-Göran Nilsson, Håkan Nygren, Björn Palmqvist, Håkan Pettersson, Ulf Sterner, Håkan Wickberg.
Coach: Arne Strömberg.

4. Finland
Goalkeepers: Urpo Ylönen, Jorma Valtonen.
Defencemen: Ilpo Koskela, Seppo Lindström, Hannu Luojola, Heikki Järn, Pekka Marjamäki, Jauko Öystilä.
Forwards: Lauri Mononen, Erkki Mononen, Seppo Repo, Esa Isaksson, Jorma Vehmanen, Lasse Oksanen, Tommi Salmelainen, Veli-Pekka Ketola, Harri Linnonmaa, Matti Murto, Esa Peltonen, Juhani Tamminen.
Coaches: Seppo Liitsola, Matias Helenius.

5. Germany
Goalkeepers: Anton Kehle, Josef Schramm.
Defencemen: Hans Schichti, Rudolf Thanner, Josef Völk, Paul Langer, Otto Schneidberger, Erwin Riedmeier, Werner Modes.
Forwards: Alois Schloder, Gustav Hanig, Bernd Kuhn, Anton Hofherr, Rainer Phillip, Lorenz Funk, Johann Eimannsberger, Franz Hofherr, Karl-Heinz Egger, Heinz Weisenbach, Klaus Ego.
Coach: Gerhard Kiessling.

6. United States
Goalkeepers: Carl Wetzel, Mike Curran, Dick Tomasoni.
Defencemen: George Konik, Jim McElmury, Don Ross, Bruce Riutta, Tom Mellor, Dick McGlynn.
Forwards: Henry Boucha, Gary Gambucci, Craig Patrick, Craig Falkman, Keith Christiansen, Tim Sheehy, Leonard Lilyholm, Kevin Ahearn, Bob Lindberg, Paul Schilling, Pete Fichuk, Richard Toomey.
Coach: Murray Williamson.

== World Championship Group B (Switzerland) ==
		SUI	POL	GDR	NOR	JPN	YUG	AUT	ITA	W	T	L	GF–GA	pts.
7.	Switzerland	***	4:4	3:1	3:2	4:1	8:5	4:1	5:0	6	1	0	31:14	13
8.	Poland	4:4	***	7:4	8:1	4:6	4:0	3:2	6:2	5	1	1	36:19	11
9.	East Germany	1:3	4:7	***	8:4	9:4	5:3	11:3	11:0	5	0	2	49:24	10
10.	Norway	2:3	1:8	4:8	***	10:6	6:3	7:2	7:2	4	0	3	37:32	8
11.	Yugoslavia	5:8	0:4	3:5	3:6	***	7:6	3:1	4:4	2	1	4	25:34	5
12.	Japan	1:4	6:4	4:9	6:10	6:7	***	6:2	4:4	2	1	4	33:40	5
13.	Austria	1:4	2:3	3:11	2:7	2:6	1:3	***	6:0	1	0	6	17:34	2
14.	Italy	0:5	2:6	0:11	2:7	4:4	4:4	0:6	***	0	2	5	12:43	2

- Switzerland qualify for 1972 Pool A championship tournament; Austria and Italy demoted to 1972 Pool C tournament. Additionally, the top six qualify for the Sapporo Olympics.

Norway – Yugoslavia 6:3 (2:0, 2:1, 2:2)

5 March 1971 – Bern

Poland – Italy 6:2 (2:0, 2:1, 2:1)

5 March 1971 – Bern

East Germany – Japan 9:4 (0:1, 4:1, 5:2)

5 March 1971 – Bern

Switzerland – Austria 4:1 (2:0, 1:0, 1:1)

5 March 1971 – Lyss

Yugoslavia – Austria 3:1 (2:0, 1:1, 0:0)

6 March 1971 – Bern

Italy – Japan 4:4 (1:0, 0:2, 3:2)

6 March 1971 – Bern

Switzerland – Norway 3:2 (0:1, 2:0, 1:1)

6 March 1971 – Lyss

Poland – East Germany 7:4 (3:0, 1:4, 3:0)

7 March 1971 – Bern

Norway – Italy 7:2 (2:1, 3:1, 2:0)

8 March 1971 – Bern

Japan – Austria 6:2 (2:0, 2:0, 2:2)

8 March 1971 – Geneva

East Germany – Yugoslavia 5:3 (2:1, 1:1, 2:1)

8 March 1971 – Bern

Switzerland – Poland 4:4 (2:0, 1:3, 1:1)

8 March 1971 – La Chaux-de-Fonds

East Germany – Italy 11:0 (5:0, 1:0, 5:0)

9 March 1971 – Bern

Norway – Austria 7:2 (1:0, 5:0, 1:2)

9 March 1971 – Geneva

Switzerland – Yugoslavia 8:5 (0:1, 3:2, 5:2)

9 March 1971 – La Chaux-de-Fonds

Japan – Poland 6:4 (2:0, 1:2, 3:2)

10 March 1971 – Lyss

East Germany – Austria 11:3 (3:1, 5:1, 3:1)

11 March 1971 – Lyss

Italy – Yugoslavia 4:4 (2:2, 1:1, 1:1)

11 March 1971 – Bern

Poland – Norway 8:1 (0:0, 5:0, 3:1)

11 March 1971 – Bern

Switzerland – Japan 4:1 (1:0, 3:0, 0:1)

11 March 1971 – La Chaux-de-Fonds

Norway – Japan 10:6 (5:1, 0:3, 5:2)

13 March 1971 – La Chaux-de-Fonds

Poland – Yugoslavia 4:0 (1:0, 0:0, 3:0)

13 March 1971 – Bern

Austria – Italy 6:0 (1:0, 1:0, 4:0)

13 March 1971 – Geneva

Switzerland – East Germany 3:1 (2:0, 0:1, 1:0)

13 March 1971 – Bern

Yugoslavia – Japan 7:6 (1:2, 5:0, 1:4)

14 March 1971 – Bern

Poland – Austria 3:2 (0:0, 2:0, 1:2)

14 March 1971 – Geneva

East Germany – Norway 8:4 (1:0, 4:2, 3:2)

14 March 1971 – La Chaux-de-Fonds

Switzerland – Italy 5:0 (2:0, 2:0, 1:0)

14 March 1971 – Lyss

== World Championship Group C (Netherlands) ==
		ROM	FRA	HUN	GBR	BUL	NED	DEN	BEL	W	T	L	GF–GA	Pts.
15.	Romania	***	7:1	3:3	11:2	12:3	10:2	6:2	21:0	6	1	0	70:11	13
16.	France	1:7	***	8:4	6:4	2:1	9:2	5:1	18:1	6	0	1	49:20	12
17.	Hungary	3:3	4:8	***	7:6	7:6	4:3	2:0	31:1	5	1	1	58:27	11
18.	Great Britain	2:11	4:6	6:7	***	5:5	7:4	5:4	18:2	3	1	3	47:39	7
19.	Bulgaria	2:12	1:2	6:7	5:5	***	7:0	4:5	11:1	2	1	4	36:32	5
20.	Netherlands	2:10	2:9	3:4	4:7	0:7	***	3:1	18:0	2	0	5	32:38	4
21.	Denmark	1:6	1:5	0:2	4:5	5:4	1:3	***	21:1	2	0	5	33:26	4
22.	Belgium	0:21	1:18	1:31	2:18	1:11	0:18	1:21	***	0	0	7	6:138	0

- Romania and France qualify for 1972 Pool B tournament, and the Sapporo Olympics.

Hungary – Bulgaria 7:6 (1:0, 4:2, 2:4)

26. February 1971 – Nijmegen

France – Romania 1:7 (0:0, 1:2, 0:5)

26. February 1971 – Utrecht

Great Britain – Belgium 18:2 (8:0, 4:0, 6:2)

26. February 1971 – Eindhoven

Netherlands – Denmark 3:1 (2:0, 0:0, 1:1)

26. February 1971 – Tilburg

Denmark – Romania 1:6 (0:0, 0:2, 1:4)

27. February 1971 – Rotterdam

Belgium – France 1:18 (0:7, 0:7, 1:4)

27. February 1971 – Utrecht

Hungary – Great Britain 7:6 (3:1, 1:2, 3:3)

27. February 1971 – Tilburg

Netherlands – Bulgaria 0:7 (0:4, 0:1, 0:2)

27. February 1971 – Geleen

France – Bulgaria 2:1 (0:1, 0:0, 2:0)

1 March 1971 – Tilburg

Hungary – Romania 3:3 (3:1, 0:0, 0:2)

1 March 1971 – Eindhoven

Denmark – Belgium 21:1 (8:0, 5:0, 8:1)

1 March 1971 – Rotterdam

Netherlands – Great Britain 4:7 (0:3, 3:1, 1:3)

1 March 1971 – s-Hertogenbosch

Great Britain – Denmark 5:4 (1:2, 3:2, 1:0)

2 March 1971 – Nijmegen

Hungary – France 4:8 (2:3, 0:2, 2:3)

2 March 1971 – Rotterdam

Bulgaria – Romania 2:12 (1:2, 1:6, 0:4)

2 March 1971 – Utrecht

Netherlands – Belgium 18:0 (5:0, 8:0, 5:0)

2 March 1971 – Eindhoven

France – Great Britain 6:4 (0:1, 4:3, 2:0)

4 March 1971 – Groningen

Denmark – Bulgaria 5:4 (0:2, 3:1, 2:1)

4 March 1971 – Heerenveen

Hungary – Belgium 31:1 (9:1, 9:0, 13:0)

4 March 1971 – s-Hertogenbosch

Netherlands – Romania 2:10 (2:4, 0:5, 0:1)

4 March 1971 – Tilburg

Great Britain – Bulgaria 5:5 (2:1, 1:2, 2:2)

5 March 1971 – Heerenveen

Romania – Belgium 21:0 (7:0, 7:0, 7:0)

5 March 1971 – Tilburg

Denmark – France 1:5 (0:3, 0:1, 1:1)

5 March 1971 – Groningen

Netherlands – Hungary 3:4 (0:1, 1:1, 2:2)

5 March 1971 – Rotterdam

Bulgaria – Belgium 11:1 (4:0, 4:0, 4:1)

7 March 1971 – Rotterdam

Denmark – Hungary 0:2 (0:1, 0:0, 0:1)

7 March 1971 – Eindhoven

Romania – Great Britain 11:2 (3:0, 4:1, 4:1)

7 March 1971 – Geleen

Netherlands – France 2:9 (1:4, 0:3, 1:2)

7 March 1971 – Utrecht

== Ranking and statistics ==
1971 IIHF World Championship winners

Soviet Union
11th title

=== Tournament Awards ===
- Best players selected by the directorate:
  - Best Goaltender: (Czechoslovakia) Jiří Holeček
  - Best Defenceman: (Czechoslovakia) Jan Suchý
  - Best Forward: (Soviet Union) Anatoli Firsov
- Media All-Star Team:
  - Goaltender: (Czechoslovakia) Jiří Holeček
  - Defence: (Finland) Ilpo Koskela, (Czechoslovakia) Jan Suchý
  - Forwards: (Soviet Union) Anatoli Firsov, (Soviet Union) Alexander Maltsev, (Soviet Union) Vladimir Vikulov

=== Final standings ===
The final standings of the tournament according to IIHF:

Gold medal	Soviet Union
Silver medal	Czechoslovakia
Bronze medal	Sweden
4	Finland
5	West Germany
6	United States

=== European championships final standings ===
The final standings of the European championships according to IIHF:

Gold medal	Czechoslovakia
Silver medal	Soviet Union
Bronze medal	Sweden
4	Finland
5	West Germany
