= Czechoslovakia at the 1972 Winter Olympics =

- IOC code: TCH
- NOC: Czechoslovak Olympic Committee

in Sapporo
- Competitors: 41 (37 men, 4 women) in 6 sports
- Flag bearer: Jiří Raška (ski jumping)
- Medals Ranked 12th: Gold 1 Silver 0 Bronze 2 Total 3

Winter Olympics appearances (overview)
- 1924; 1928; 1932; 1936; 1948; 1952; 1956; 1960; 1964; 1968; 1972; 1976; 1980; 1984; 1988; 1992

Other related appearances
- Czech Republic (1994–pres.); Slovakia (1994–pres.)

Czechoslovakia competed at the 1972 Winter Olympics in Sapporo, Japan. Ondrej Nepela won figure skating gold medal.

== Medalists ==
Medal	Name	Sport	Event	Date
Gold	Ondrej Nepela	Figure skating	Men's singles	11 February
Bronze	Helena Šikolová	Cross-country skiing	Women's 5 km	9 February
Bronze	Czechoslovakia men's national ice hockey team: Vladimír Dzurilla; Jiří Holeček; Vladimír Bednář; Rudolf Tajcnár; Oldřich Machač; František Pospíšil; Josef Horešovský; Karel Vohralík; Václav Nedomanský; Jiří Holík; Jaroslav Holík; Jiří Kochta; Eduard Novák; Richard Farda; Josef Černý; Vladimír Martinec; Ivan Hlinka; Bohuslav Šťastný	Ice hockey	Men's competition	13 February

== Biathlon ==
Men

Event	Athlete	Time	Penalties	Adjusted time ^{1}	Rank
20 km	Pavel Ploc	1'18:38.79	11	1'29:38.79	47
20 km	Stanislav Fajstavr	1'19:53.33	9	1'28:53.33	44
20 km	Arnošt Hájek	1'19:22.37	9	1'28:22.37	39
20 km	Ladislav Žižka	1'16:36.81	11	1'27:36.81	36

^{1} One minute added per close miss (a hit in the outer ring), two minutes added per complete miss.

Men's 4 x 7.5 km relay

Athletes	Race		
Athletes	Misses ^{2}	Time	Rank
Ladislav Žižka; Pavel Ploc; Ján Húska; Arnošt Hájek	3	2'03:08.17	12

^{2} A penalty loop of 200 metres had to be skied per missed target.

== Cross-country skiing ==
Men

Event	Athlete	Race	
Event	Athlete	Time	Rank
15 km	Ján Michalko	48:31.64	30
15 km	Ján Fajstavr	48:18.22	29
15 km	Stanislav Henych	47:25.81	21
30 km	Ján Michalko	1'46:19.36	40
30 km	Ján Fajstavr	1'44:49.45	34
30 km	Stanislav Henych	1'39:24.29	9
50 km	Ján Michalko	2'58:31.83	30
50 km	Ján Fajstavr	2'51:12.92	19

Men's 4 × 10 km relay

Athletes	Race	
Athletes	Time	Rank
Stanislav Henych; Ján Fajstavr; Ján Michalko; Ján Ilavský	2'11:27.55	8

Women

Event	Athlete	Race	
Event	Athlete	Time	Rank
5 km	Milena Chlumová	18:12.22	27
5 km	Milena Cillerová	17:56.22	22
5 km	Alena Bartošová	17:47.25	16
5 km	Helena Šikolová	17:07.32	3rd place, bronze medalist(s)
10 km	Milena Cillerová	37:40.70	30
10 km	Alena Bartošová	37:01.73	27
10 km	Milena Chlumová	36:59.87	26
10 km	Helena Šikolová	35:29.33	7

Women's 3 × 5 km relay

Athletes	Race	
Athletes	Time	Rank
Alena Bartošová; Helena Šikolová; Milena Cillerová	51:16.16	6

== Figure skating ==
Men

Athlete	CF	FS	Points	Places	Rank
Ondrej Nepela	1	4	2739.1	9	1st place, gold medalist(s)

== Ice hockey ==
=== First round ===
Winners (in bold) entered the Medal Round. Other teams played a consolation round for 7th-11th places.

Team 1	Score	Team 2
Japan	2–8	**Czechoslovakia**

=== Medal round ===
Rank	Team	Pld	W	L	T	GF	GA	Pts
1	Soviet Union	5	4	0	1	33	13	9
2	United States	5	3	2	0	18	15	6
3	Czechoslovakia (bronze)	5	3	2	0	26	13	6
4	Sweden	5	2	2	1	17	13	5
5	Finland	5	2	3	0	14	24	4
6	Poland	5	0	5	0	9	39	0

- Czechoslovakia 14-1 Poland
- USA 5-1 Czechoslovakia
- Czechoslovakia 7-1 Finland
- Czechoslovakia 2-1 Sweden
- USSR 5-2 Czechoslovakia

=== Leading scorers ===
Player	GP	G	A	Pts
**2nd** Václav Nedomanský	5	6	3	9
**9th** Jiří Kochta	5	3	3	6
**10th** Richard Farda	5	1	5	6

Bronze:
Vladimír Dzurilla
Jiří Holeček
Vladimír Bednář
Rudolf Tajcnár
Oldřich Machač
František Pospíšil
Josef Horešovský
Karel Vohralík
Václav Nedomanský
Jiří Holík
Jaroslav Holík
Jiří Kochta
Eduard Novák
Richard Farda
Josef Černý
Vladimír Martinec
Ivan Hlinka
Bohuslav Šťastný

== Nordic combined ==
Events:

- Normal hill ski jumping (three jumps, best two counted and shown here).
- 15 km cross-country skiing

Athlete	Event	Ski jumping				Cross-country			Total	
Athlete	Event	Distance 1	Distance 2	Points	Rank	Time	Points	Rank	Points	Rank
Ladislav Rygl	Individual	65.5	71.0	160.4	24	51:09.2	195.355	16	355.755	26
Libor Foltman	Individual	70.5	67.5	155.0	30	DNF	–	–	DNF	–
Tomáš Kučera	Individual	75.5	75.5	191.8	7	51:04.0	196.135	14	387.935	6
Jaroslav Svoboda	Individual	71.5	71.5	175.9	19	53:20.2	175.705	33	351.605	28

== Ski jumping ==
Athlete	Event	Jump 1		Jump 2		Total	
Athlete	Event	Distance	Points	Distance	Points	Points	Rank
Rudolf Höhnl	Normal hill	73.5	100.8	73.5	100.8	201.6	29
Jiří Raška	Normal hill	78.5	112.3	78.0	112.5	224.8	5
Zbyněk Hubač	Normal hill	79.0	113.1	75.0	104.7	217.8	11
Karel Kodejška	Normal hill	80.0	114.7	75.5	105.5	220.2	7
Zbyněk Hubač	Large hill	91.5	96.1	91.5	98.6	194.7	15
Leoš Škoda	Large hill	89.5	96.3	85.0	80.0	176.3	26
Jiří Raška	Large hill	99.0	111.1	89.0	93.6	204.7	10
