= Czechoslovakia at the 1976 Winter Olympics =

- IOC code: TCH
- NOC: Czechoslovak Olympic Committee

in Innsbruck
- Competitors: 58 (47 men, 11 women) in 9 sports
- Flag bearer: Oldřich Machač (ice hockey)
- Medals Ranked 13th: Gold 0 Silver 1 Bronze 0 Total 1

Winter Olympics appearances (overview)
- 1924; 1928; 1932; 1936; 1948; 1952; 1956; 1960; 1964; 1968; 1972; 1976; 1980; 1984; 1988; 1992

Other related appearances
- Czech Republic (1994–pres.); Slovakia (1994–pres.)

Czechoslovakia competed at the 1976 Winter Olympics in Innsbruck, Austria, where is won one silver medal.

== Medalists ==
Medal	Name	Sport	Event	Date
Silver	Czechoslovakia men's national ice hockey team: Jiří Holík; Oldřich Machač; František Pospíšil; Jiří Holeček; Bohuslav Šťastný; Ivan Hlinka; Vladimír Martinec; Eduard Novák; Josef Augusta; Jiří Bubla; Milan Chalupa; Jiří Crha; Miroslav Dvořák; Bohuslav Ebermann; Milan Kajkl; Jiří Novák; Milan Nový; Jaroslav Pouzar	Ice hockey	Men's tournament	14 February

== Alpine skiing ==
Men

Athlete	Event	Race 1		Race 2		Total	
Athlete	Event	Time	Rank	Time	Rank	Time	Rank
Miloslav Sochor	Downhill					1:53.48	40
Bohumír Zeman	Downhill					1:51.27	33
Bohumír Zeman	Giant Slalom	1:49.10	26	1:48.46	24	3:37.56	23
Miloslav Sochor	Giant Slalom	1:47.46	13	1:46.07	13	3:33.53	11
Bohumír Zeman	Slalom	DNF	–	–	–	DNF	–
Miloslav Sochor	Slalom	1:03.11	15	1:06.50	14	2:09.61	14

Women

Athlete	Event	Race 1		Race 2		Total	
Athlete	Event	Time	Rank	Time	Rank	Time	Rank
Jana Šoltýsová-Gantnerová	Downhill					1:55.02	33
Dagmar Kuzmanová	Downhill					1:54.81	32
Jana Šoltýsová-Gantnerová	Giant Slalom					1:34.00	25
Dagmar Kuzmanová	Giant Slalom					1:30.69	9
Jana Šoltýsová-Gantnerová	Slalom	51.34	22	DNF	–	DNF	–
Dagmar Kuzmanová	Slalom	48.62	9	47.08	10	1:35.70	9

== Biathlon ==
Men

Event	Athlete	Time	Penalties	Adjusted time ^{1}	Rank
20 km	Josef Malínský	1'19:09.18	9	1'28:09.18	44
20 km	Ladislav Žižka	1'19:09.03	4	1'23:09.03	24
20 km	Antonín Kříž	1'17:11.36	4	1'21:11.36	17

^{1} One minute added per close miss (a hit in the outer ring), two minutes added per complete miss.

Men's 4 x 7.5 km relay

Athletes	Race		
Athletes	Misses ^{2}	Time	Rank
Ladislav Žižka; Miroslav Soviš; Antonín Kříž; Zdeněk Pavlíček	4	2'09:06.63	9

^{2} A penalty loop of 200 metres had to be skied per missed target.

== Bobsleigh ==
Sled	Athletes	Event	Run 1		Run 2		Run 3		Run 4		Total	
Sled	Athletes	Event	Time	Rank	Time	Rank	Time	Rank	Time	Rank	Time	Rank
TCH-1	Jiří Paulát; Václav Sůva	Two-man	57.78	17	57.74	17	57.97	20	58.22	20	3:51.71	17

== Cross-country skiing ==
Men

Event	Athlete	Race	
Event	Athlete	Time	Rank
15 km	Stanislav Henych	48:31.23	46
15 km	Milan Jarý	47:50.01	39
15 km	Ján Fajstavr	47:25.77	35
15 km	František Šimon	47:24.90	34
30 km	Ján Michalko	1'38:40.28	46
30 km	Jiří Beran	1'38:39.61	45
30 km	František Šimon	1'38:34.16	44
30 km	Milan Jarý	1'35:52.55	26
50 km	Stanislav Henych	2'48:00.27	30
50 km	Ján Fajstavr	2'45:19.91	17
50 km	Jiří Beran	2'44:51.80	15
50 km	Milan Jarý	2'44:51.16	14

Men's 4 × 10 km relay

Athletes	Race	
Athletes	Time	Rank
František Šimon; Milan Jarý; Jiří Beran; Stanislav Henych	2'12:49.99	10

Women

Event	Athlete	Race	
Event	Athlete	Time	Rank
5 km	Miroslava Jaškovská	17:26.48	23
5 km	Anna Pasiárová	16:54.98	15
5 km	Gabriela Svobodová-Sekajová	16:53.22	13
5 km	Blanka Paulů	16:41.65	10
10 km	Alena Bartošová	34:18.73	35
10 km	Gabriela Svobodová-Sekajová	32:28.76	19
10 km	Blanka Paulů	32:06.54	17
10 km	Anna Pasiárová	31:44.97	13

Women's 4 × 5 km relay

Athletes	Race	
Athletes	Time	Rank
Anna Pasiárová; Gabriela Svobodová-Sekajová; Alena Bartošová; Blanka Paulů	1'11:27.83	6

== Figure skating ==
Men

Athlete	CF	SP	FS	Points	Places	Rank
Zdeněk Pazdírek	8	13	12	172.48	106	12

Women

Athlete	CF	SP	FS	Points	Places	Rank
Eva Ďurišinová	19	17	18	158.22	162	19

Pairs

Athletes	SP	FS	Points	Places	Rank
Ingrid Spieglová; Alan Spiegl	14	11	118.39	112	13

Ice Dancing

Athletes	CD	FD	Points	Places	Rank
Eva Pestova; Jiri Pokorny	11	10	180.60	96	11

== Ice hockey ==
=== First round ===
Winners (in bold) entered the Medal Round. Other teams played a consolation round for 7th-12th places.

Team 1	Score	Team 2
**Czechoslovakia**	14–1	Bulgaria

=== Medal round ===
Rank		Pld	W	L	T	GF	GA	Pts
1	Soviet Union	5	5	0	0	40	11	10
2	Czechoslovakia (silver)	5	3	2	0	17	10	6
3	West Germany	5	2	3	0	21	24	4
4	Finland	5	2	3	0	19	18	4
5	United States	5	2	3	0	15	21	4
6	Poland	5	1	4	0	9	37	2

- Czechoslovakia 2–1 Finland
- Czechoslovakia 5–0 USA
- Poland 1–0* Czechoslovakia
- Czechoslovakia 7–4 West Germany
- USSR 4–3 Czechoslovakia

* Note: The score after the Czechoslovakia vs Poland match was 7–1, but due to the positive doping test of one of the Czechoslovak players, the team was recorded a 0–1 loss. Poland did not receive any points.

Silver:
Jiří Holík
Oldřich Machač
František Pospíšil
Jiří Holeček
Bohuslav Šťastný
Ivan Hlinka
Vladimír Martinec
Eduard Novák
Josef Augusta
Jiří Bubla
Milan Chalupa
Jiří Crha
Miroslav Dvořák
Bohuslav Ebermann
Milan Kajkl
Jiří Novák
Milan Nový
Jaroslav Pouzar
Pavol Svitana

== Luge ==
Men

Athlete	Run 1		Run 2		Run 3		Run 4		Total	
Athlete	Time	Rank	Time	Rank	Time	Rank	Time	Rank	Time	Rank
Stanislav Ptáčník	54.450	19	53.810	16	53.207	14	53.371	12	3:34.838	14
Jindřich Zeman	54.377	17	53.974	20	53.701	20	54.068	20	3:36.167	18
Vladimír Resl	54.109	15	59.068	37	53.418	17	53.640	16	3:40.235	23

(Men's) doubles

Athletes	Run 1		Run 2		Total	
Athletes	Time	Rank	Time	Rank	Time	Rank
Jindřich Zeman; Vladimír Resl	43.315	7	43.511	7	1:26.826	6

Women

Athlete	Run 1		Run 2		Run 3		Run 4		Total	
Athlete	Time	Rank	Time	Rank	Time	Rank	Time	Rank	Time	Rank
Dana Spálenská-Beldová	43.560	9	43.063	10	43.178	12	43.405	11	2:53.206	10

== Nordic combined ==
Events:

- normal hill ski jumping (Three jumps, best two counted and shown here.)
- 15 km cross-country skiing

Athlete	Event	Ski jumping				Cross-country			Total	
Athlete	Event	Distance 1	Distance 2	Points	Rank	Time	Points	Rank	Points	Rank
Josef Pospíšil	Individual	69.5	77.0	197.9	12	50:14.69	200.03	10	397.93	12
František Zeman	Individual	72.0	72.5	189.9	21	51:00.17	193.21	16	383.11	15

== Ski jumping ==
Athlete	Event	Jump 1		Jump 2		Total	
Athlete	Event	Distance	Points	Distance	Points	Points	Rank
Ivo Felix	Normal hill	75.0	105.3	76.0	107.4	212.7	26
Karel Kodejška	Normal hill	76.0	108.4	78.0	114.1	222.5	18
Rudolf Höhnl	Normal hill	78.0	112.6	78.5	111.4	224.0	16
Jaroslav Balcar	Normal hill	81.0	118.9	81.5	120.7	239.6	4
Rudolf Höhnl	Large hill	85.5	92.7	78.5	82.4	175.1	34
Jindřich Balcar	Large hill	88.0	94.7	81.0	83.4	178.1	27
Karel Kodejška	Large hill	88.0	95.2	79.0	80.6	175.8	31
Jaroslav Balcar	Large hill	88.0	98.7	86.0	95.9	194.6	14
