= Biathlon at the 1976 Winter Olympics – Individual =

Men's biathlon individual at the XII Olympic Winter Games
- Venue: Seefeld
- Dates: 6 February 1976
- Competitors: 52 from 18 nations
- Winning time: 1:14:12.3

Medalists
1st place, gold medalist(s)		Nikolay Kruglov	Soviet Union
2nd place, silver medalist(s)		Heikki Ikola	Finland
3rd place, bronze medalist(s)		Aleksandr Elizarov	Soviet Union

The Men's 20 kilometre individual biathlon competition at the 1976 Winter Olympics was held on 6 February, at Seefeld. Each miss of the target cost two minutes, while hitting the outer circle cost one minute.

== Summary ==
Defending world champion Heikki Ikola was among the leaders after the first shooting around, but he trailed Soviet Aleksandr Tikhonov, who set a torrid pace. Tikhonov led by thirty seconds at the halfway point, despite missing a shot, and after shooting clear the third time, the Soviet was up by more than a minute on Ikola and Nikolay Kruglov, the worlds silver medalist. However, at the final shot, Tikhonov collapsed, taking six penalty minutes to fall out of medal contention. Ikola took two minutes in penalties as well, meaning Kruglov, who had just one minute penalty, was able to pass him to win the gold medal. Aleksandr Elizarov could have taken silver with a better shooting performance than Ikola, but matched the Finn with two minutes in penalties, and while he cut Ikola's lead in half on the final section, he was left in third place. Tikhonov ended up with the fastest ski time by almost two full minutes, but his late misses meant he ended up in fifth.

== Results ==
Penalties refer to minutes added, as described above, not (necessarily) number of targets missed.

Rank	Bib	Name	Country	Ski Time	Penalties (P+S+P+S)	Result	Deficit
1st place, gold medalist(s)	9	Nikolay Kruglov	Soviet Union	1:12:12.26	2 (1+0+0+1)	1:14:12.26	–
2nd place, silver medalist(s)	21	Heikki Ikola	Finland	1:13:54.10	2 (0+0+0+2)	1:15:54.10	+1:41.84
3rd place, bronze medalist(s)	49	Aleksandr Elizarov	Soviet Union	1:13:05.57	3 (1+0+0+2)	1:16:05.57	+1:53.31
4	3	Willy Bertin	Italy	1:13:50.36	3 (0+3+0+0)	1:16:50.36	+2:38.10
5	34	Aleksandr Tikhonov	Soviet Union	1:10:18.33	7 (0+1+0+6)	1:17:18.33	+3:06.07
6	15	Esko Saira	Finland	1:15:32.84	2 (0+0+0+2)	1:17:32.84	+3:20.58
7	40	Lino Jordan	Italy	1:15:49.83	2 (0+0+2+0)	1:17:49.83	+3:37.57
8	23	Sune Adolfsson	Sweden	1:16:00.50	2 (0+0+0+2)	1:18:00.50	+3:48.24
9	33	Tor Svendsberget	Norway	1:15:10.13	3 (0+2+1+0)	1:18:10.13	+3:57.87
10	8	Lars-Göran Arwidson	Sweden	1:13:34.37	5 (0+1+1+3)	1:18:34.37	+4:22.11
11	31	Heinrich Mehringer	West Germany	1:16:49.15	2 (1+1+0+0)	1:18:49.15	+4:36.89
12	36	Manfred Geyer	East Germany	1:13:11.37	6 (1+3+2+0)	1:19:11.37	+4:59.11
13	43	Juhani Suutarinen	Finland	1:17:25.89	2 (1+0+1+0)	1:19:25.89	+5:13.63
14	29	Hansruedi Süssli	Switzerland	1:16:53.73	3 (0+0+0+3)	1:19:53.73	+5:41.47
15	51	Karl-Heinz Wolf	East Germany	1:15:06.89	5 (1+2+2+0)	1:20:06.89	+5:54.63
16	7	Gheorghe Voicu	Romania	1:16:01.52	5 (1+2+1+1)	1:21:01.52	+6:49.26
17	13	Antonín Kříž	Czechoslovakia	1:17:11.36	4 (1+1+1+1)	1:21:11.36	+6:59.10
18	10	Kjell Hovda	Norway	1:16:24.45	5 (0+0+0+5)	1:21:24.45	+7:12.19
19	17	Jan Szpunar	Poland	1:17:27.20	4 (0+3+1+0)	1:21:27.20	+7:14.94
20	45	Svein Engen	Norway	1:14:27.24	7 (2+4+0+1)	1:21:27.24	+7:15.98
21	35	Alfred Eder	Austria	1:14:42.52	8 (2+3+1+2)	1:22:42.52	+8:30.26
22	22	René Arpin	France	1:13:50.92	9 (3+2+1+3)	1:22:50.92	+8:38.66
23	28	Pierantonio Clementi	Italy	1:16:08.86	7 (1+3+1+2)	1:23:08.86	+8:56.60
24	25	Ladislav Žižka	Czechoslovakia	1:19:09.03	4 (0+2+2+0)	1:23:09.03	+8:56.77
25	2	Albert Mächler	Switzerland	1:17:28.66	6 (2+1+1+2)	1:23:28.66	+9:16.40
26	47	Josef Niedermeier	West Germany	1:18:33.63	5 (0+3+0+2)	1:23:33.63	+9:21.37
27	11	Manfred Beer	East Germany	1:18:42.50	5 (1+2+0+2)	1:23:42.50	+9:30.24
28	19	Wojciech Truchan	Poland	1:16:09.93	8 (1+1+0+5)	1:24:09.93	+9:57.67
29	46	Graeme Ferguson	Great Britain	1:18:18.09	6 (1+2+3+2)	1:24:18.09	+10:05.83
30	48	Hiroyuki Deguchi	Japan	1:18:18.09	4 (0+2+0+4)	1:24:53.84	+10:41.58
31	6	Gheorghe Gârniţă	Romania	1:20:53.84	4 (0+0+2+2)	1:25:00.71	+10:48.45
32	27	Khristo Madzharov	Bulgaria	1:17:00.71	8 (0+1+0+7)	1:25:02.62	+10:50.36
33	50	Jean-Claude Viry	France	1:18:09.51	7 (0+2+1+4)	1:25:09.51	+10:57.25
34	1	Alois Kanamüller	West Germany	1:17:25.26	8 (1+2+2+3)	1:25:25.26	+11:13.00
35	5	Lyle Nelson	United States	1:15:27.50	10 (1+4+3+2)	1:25:27.50	+11:15.24
36	24	Malcolm Hirst	Great Britain	1:16:52.97	9 (2+1+1+5)	1:25:52.97	+11:40.71
37	4	Franz-Josef Weber	Austria	1:16:14.92	10 (3+0+1+6)	1:26:14.92	+12:02.66
38	26	Manabu Suzuki	Japan	1:19:35.79	7 (1+1+1+4)	1:26:35.79	+12:23.53
39	12	Jeffrey Stevens	Great Britain	1:18:15.87	9 (1+1+0+7)	1:27:15.87	+13:03.61
40	38	Christian Danuser	Switzerland	1:20:16.43	7 (0+3+0+4)	1:27:16.43	+13:04.17
41	41	Kazuo Sasakubo	Japan	1:21:35.31	6 (0+2+1+3)	1:27:35.31	+13:23.05
42	18	Aimé Gruet-Masson	France	1:18:35.81	9 (2+2+0+5)	1:27:35.81	+13:23.55
43	14	Iliya Todorov	Bulgaria	1:20:57.60	7 (1+2+1+3)	1:27:57.60	+13:45.34
44	39	Josef Malínský	Czechoslovakia	1:19:09.18	9 (1+4+1+3)	1:28:09.18	+13:56.92
45	42	Nicolae Cristoloveanu	Romania	1:20:15.53	8 (0+2+1+5)	1:28:15.53	+14:03.27
46	30	Andrzej Rapacz	Poland	1:18:30.82	10 (1+4+1+4)	1:28:30.82	+14:18.56
47	37	Martin Hagen	United States	1:20:49.20	8 (2+4+2+0)	1:28:49.20	+14:36.94
48	44	Torsten Wadman	Sweden	1:15:20.34	15 (2+2+4+7)	1:30:20.34	+16:08.08
49	52	Klaus Farbmacher	Austria	1:20:31.07	16 (4+5+3+4)	1:36:31.07	+22:18.81
50	20	Ueng Ming-yih	Republic of China	1:32:09.37	10 (4+2+1+3)	1:42:09.37	+27:57.11
51	16	Shen Li-chien	Republic of China	1:49:32.91	9 (2+3+2+2)	1:58:32.91	+44:20.65
–	32	Peter Dascoulias	United States	DNF	–	–	–
