= Czechia men's national junior ice hockey team =

Czech Republic
- Association: Czech Ice Hockey Association
- General manager: (Czech Republic) Otakar Černý
- Head coach: (Czech Republic) Patrik Augusta
- Assistants: (Czech Republic) Igor Horyl, Robert Reichel, Ladislav Šmíd
- Captain: Petr Sikora
- Most points: Václav Varaďa (16)
- IIHF code: CZE
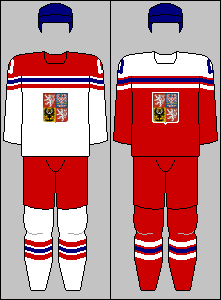

First international
- Czech Republic 6–1 Sweden (Vuokatti, Finland; 29 August 1993)

Biggest win
- Kazakhstan 2–14 Czech Republic (Ottawa, Ontario, Canada; 28 December 2024)

Biggest defeat
- Sweden 10–1 Czech Republic (Regina, Saskatchewan, Canada; 18 December 2009)

IIHF World Junior Championship
- Appearances: 33 (first in 1994)
- Best result: (gold) (2000, 2001)

International record (W–L–T)
- 101-94-8

Medal record

IIHF World Junior Championship
Gold medal – first place	2000 Sweden	
Gold medal – first place	2001 Russia	
Silver medal – second place	2023 Canada	
Silver medal – second place	2026 United States	
Bronze medal – third place	2005 United States	
Bronze medal – third place	2024 Sweden	
Bronze medal – third place	2025 Canada	

The Czech Republic men's national junior ice hockey team is the national under-20 ice hockey team in the Czech Republic. Since 2021, the team has been officially known in English as Czechia. The team represents the Czech Republic at the International Ice Hockey Federation's IIHF World Junior Championship. The team has won medals in 2000, 2001, 2005, 2023, 2024, 2025 and 2026.

== World Championship results ==
Championship	W	OW	T	OL	L	GF	GA	Captain	Coach	Rank
1974–1993	As part of Czechoslovakia									
(Czech Republic) 1994 Ostrava	3	-	0	-	4	31	29	David Výborný	Vladimír Vůjtek	5th
(Canada) 1995 Red Deer, Alberta	3	-	0	-	4	43	26	František Ptáček	Vladimír Vůjtek	6th
(United States) 1996 Boston	2	-	2	-	2	18	22	Robert Jindřich	Slavomír Lener	4th
(Switzerland) 1997 Geneve, Morges	2	-	2	-	3	19	19	Jiří Burger	Vladimír Martinec	4th
(Finland) 1998 Helsinki, Hämeenlinna	3	-	1	-	3	24	22	Tomáš Kaberle	Vladimír Martinec	4th
(Canada) 1999 Winnipeg	3	-	0	-	3	26	18	Petr Vála	Jaroslav Holík	7th
(Sweden) 2000 Umeå, Skellefteå	5	-	2	-	0	23	11	Milan Kraft	Jaroslav Holík	1st place, gold medalist(s)
(Russia) 2001 Moscow, Podolsk	7	-	0	-	0	27	8	Michal Sivek	Jaroslav Holík	1st place, gold medalist(s)
(Czech Republic) 2002 Pardubice, Hradec Králové	2	-	0	-	2	21	16	Libor Ustrnul	Jaroslav Holík	7th
(Canada) 2003 Halifax, Sydney	2	-	1	-	3	11	13	Lukáš Chmelíř	Jaroslav Holík	6th
(Finland) 2004 Helsinki, Hämeenlinna	3	-	0	-	4	20	20	Jiří Hudler	Alois Hadamczik	4th
(United States) 2005 Grand Forks, Thief River Falls	5	-	0	-	2	23	14	Petr Vrána	Alois Hadamczik	3rd place, bronze medalist(s)
(Canada) 2006 Vancouver, Kelowna, Kamloops	2	-	0	-	4	16	19	Ladislav Šmíd	Radim Rulík	6th
(Sweden) 2007 Leksand, Mora	3	0	-	0	3	17	19	Jakub Kindl	Vladimír Bednář	5th
(Czech Republic) 2008 Pardubice, Liberec	3	0	-	0	3	18	16	Michael Frolík	Miroslav Hořava	5th
(Canada) 2009 Ottawa	2	0	-	1	3	24	22	David Štich	Marek Sýkora	6th
(Canada) 2010 Saskatoon, Regina	4	0	-	0	3	35	25	Michal Jordán	Jaromír Šindel	7th
(United States) 2011 Buffalo, Niagara	3	0	-	0	3	18	25	Jakub Jeřábek	Miroslav Přerost	7th
(Canada) 2012 Calgary, Edmonton	3	0	-	1	2	18	15	Tomáš Nosek	Miroslav Přerost	5th
(Russia) 2013 Ufa	3	1	-	0	2	16	20	Lukáš Sedlák	Miroslav Přerost	5th
(Sweden) 2014 Malmö	1	1	-	0	3	12	18	Petr Šidlík	Miroslav Přerost	6th
(Canada) 2015 Montreal, Toronto	1	1	-	0	3	12	17	Dominik Kubalík	Miroslav Přerost	6th
(Finland) 2016 Helsinki	2	0	-	1	1	12	10	Dominik Mašín	Jakub Petr	5th
(Canada) 2017 Toronto, Montreal	1	0	-	2	2	12	18	Filip Hronek	Jakub Petr	6th
(United States) 2018 Buffalo	3	1	-	0	3	27	34	Marek Zachar	Filip Pešán	4th
(Canada) 2019 Vancouver, Victoria	1	1	-	0	3	9	11	Martin Nečas	Václav Varaďa	7th
(Czech Republic) 2020 Ostrava, Třinec	1	0	-	1	3	12	23	Libor Zábranský	Václav Varaďa	7th
(Canada) 2021 Edmonton	2	0	-	0	3	10	17	Jan Myšák	Karel Mlejnek	7th
(Canada) 2022 Edmonton	2	0	-	1	4	18	28	Jan Myšák	Radim Rulík	4th
(Canada) 2023 Halifax, Moncton	4	1	-	2	0	37	11	Stanislav Svozil	Radim Rulík	2nd place, silver medalist(s)
(Sweden) 2024 Gothenburg	4	0	-	1	2	33	25	Jiří Kulich	Patrik Augusta	3rd place, bronze medalist(s)
(Canada) 2025 Ottawa	4	1	-	0	2	33	18	Eduard Šalé	Patrik Augusta	3rd place, bronze medalist(s)
(United States) 2026 Minneapolis, Saint Paul	4	1	-	0	2	32	22	Petr Sikora	Patrik Augusta	2nd place, silver medalist(s)
