= Malinský =

Malinský is a surname. Notable people with the surname include:

- Josef Malínský (born 1953), Czech biathlete
- Ondřej Malinský (born 1983), Czech ice hockey defenceman
- Tomáš Malinský (born 1991), Czech football player

== See also ==
- Malinska
