= Kochta =

Kochta (feminine: Kochtová) is a Czech surname. Notable people with the surname include:

- Jiří Kochta (1946–2025), Czech ice hockey player and coach
- Marketa Kochta (born 1975), German-Czech tennis player, daughter of Jiří
- Renata Kochta (born 1973), German-Czech tennis player, daughter of Jiří
