= Žilina (disambiguation) =

Žilina may refer to:

- Žilina, a city in Slovakia
- Žilina (Kladno District), a municipality and village in the Czech Republic
- Žilina, an administrative part of Nový Jičín in the Czech Republic
