= CEE Property Development Portfolio =

CEE Property Development Portfolio B.V. (CPDP) is a closed-end real estate investment fund registered in the Netherlands. It is part of consolidated financial statements of Erste Group's subsidiary Česká spořitelna. In October 2015 Česká spořitelna announced it intends to liquidate the fund.

Since its launch in September 2004 its assets are managed by company CEE Asset Management (CEE AM). CEE AM used to be a subsidiary of real estate development company Sekyra Group managed by Luděk Sekyra, since April 2008 it was owned by Jersey-based CEE ASSET MANAGEMENT LIMITED.

After its incorporation CPDP purchased company Roztyly Centrum, owner of administrative building leased by T-Mobile Czech Republic, and company Gallery MYŠÁK owning a real estate in downtown of Prague. In August 2006 the fund founded a subsidiary CPDP Jungmannova, which in turn acquired from Sekyra Group company Mrázovka II, owning administrative building Golden Cross on Jungmann square in Prague. In April 2007 CPDP acquired 20% stake in project Central Park Praha. In February 2009 the fund subscribed newly issued shares of company CPP Lux and as a result increased its share in project Central Park Praha to 99,9%.

In December 2009 Česká spořitelna recognised a provision of CZK 1.8 billion against its ownership interest in CPDP. In August 2010 daily E15 reported about attempt of CPDP to sell companies from its real estate portfolio.

Subsidiaries of CPDP, brutto equity investment in million CZK
subsidiary	share	acquired in	investment	real estate	notes
Gallery MYŠÁK a. s.	100%	2004	307	building in Vodičkova street in Prague	sold in 2016
CPDP 2003 s.r.o.	100%	2004	579	headquarters of T-Mobile ČR in Prague-Roztyly	sold in 2026 to TJ Assets Management
CPDP Polygon s.r.o.	100%	2006	253	building in Prague	sold in 2014
CPDP Prievozska, a.s.	100%	2006	266	building in Prievozská street in Bratislava	sold in May 2017
TAVARESA a.s.	100%	2006	34	sewage and water connections in Prague-Stodůlky	sold in 2013 for approx. CZK 3 mio. to Unistav
Campus Park a.s.	100%	2006	51	Campus Park Stodůlky	spun off from TAVARESA, sold in October 2016
CPDP Jungmannova s.r.o.	100%	2006	169	administrative building on Jungmann square in Prague	sold in 2013
CPDP Shopping Mall Kladno, a.s.	100%	2007	470	OAZA Kladno	sold in September 2015 for CZK 13 mio. to Qidong Heng
CP Praha s.r.o.	99,9%	2007	1,038	unsold flats in project Central Park Praha	declared insolvency in January 2015.
ČS Technické centrum s.r.o.	100%	2007	300	building in Prague	bought for CZK 300 mio. crowns from Dutch companies Allafon Holding B.V. and Allafon Holding II N.V. owned by entrepreneur Luděk Sekyra, sold to Česká spořitelna in 2010
CPDP Logistics Park Kladno I a.s.	100%	2008	189	land plot by Buštěhrad and project	liquidation completed in September 2017
CPDP Logistics Park Kladno II a.s.	100%	2008	182	land plot by Buštěhrad and project	liquidation completed in September 2017
Total			3,837		
