= Paul Schilling =

American ice hockey player and coach

Biographical details
- Born: October 5, 1946; Utica, New York, U.S.
- Died: October 17, 2023 (aged 77)

Playing career
- 1966–1967: Army
- 1967–1970: Boston College
- 1970–1972: Lowell Chiefs
- Position: Forward

Coaching career (HC unless noted)
- 1970–1975: Babson
- 1975–1978: Brown (assistant)
- 1978–1982: Brown

Head coaching record
- Overall: 74–113–7 (.399)

Paul G. Schilling (October 5, 1946 – October 17, 2023) was an American ice hockey player and coach who led Brown from 1978 to 1982.

Schilling was born in Utica, New York and graduated from Clinton High School in 1963 and the Kimball Union Academy in 1965. He played three seasons for the Boston College Eagles men's ice hockey after transferring from Army. He played two seasons of senior ice hockey for the Lowell Chiefs and was member of the United States national team during the 1971 Ice Hockey World Championships.

Schilling began his coaching career in 1970 as the head coach at Babson College. In 1975, he became an assistant under Richard Toomey at Brown. He succeeded Toomey when he left coaching in 1978. Schilling resigned at the end of the 1981–82 season, citing his team's lack of improvement, the inability to get quality players without athletic scholarships, and his disappointment with having to spend more time recruiting and talking with alumni than coaching.

After leaving Brown, Schilling worked as a sales manager for an Anheuser-Busch distributor. He spent his retirement in The Pinehills, Massachusetts and Hutchinson Island in Florida. In 2018, he was inducted into the Boston College Varsity Club Hall of Fame. He died on October 17, 2023.

== Head coaching record ==
Record table
Season	Team	Overall	Conference	Standing	Postseason
Babson Beavers (ECAC 2) (1970–1975)
1970–71	Babson	5–9–2			
1971–72	Babson	8–11–1			
1972–73	Babson	10–7–0			
1973–74	Babson	8–10–1			
1974–75	Babson	9–10–0			
Babson:		40–47–4			
Brown Bears (ECAC Hockey) (1978–1982)
1978–79	Brown	11–14–0	10–11–0	10th	
1979–80	Brown	10–14–2	9–11–2	10th	
1980–81	Brown	5–20–1	3–18–1	17th	
1981–82	Brown	8–18–0	6–15–0	16th	
Brown:		34–66–3	28–55–3		
Total:		74–113–7			
National champion Postseason invitational champion Conference regular season champion Conference regular season and conference tournament champion Division regular season champion Division regular season and conference tournament champion Conference tournament champion
