= Salmelainen =

Salmelainen is a Finnish surname.

== Geographical distribution ==
As of 2014, 94.5% of all known bearers of the surname Salmelainen were residents of Finland (frequency 1:24,760), 2.1% of Sweden (1:1,969,352) and 2.1% of Australia (1:4,754,775).

In Finland, the frequency of the surname was higher than national average (1:24,760) in the following regions:

1. North Karelia (1:5,086)
2. Southern Savonia (1:15,895)
3. Central Finland (1:16,737)
4. Uusimaa (1:17,584)
5. Kymenlaakso (1:18,989)
6. Tavastia Proper (1:23,877)

== People ==
- Tony Salmelainen, Finnish ice-hockey player
- Tommi Salmelainen, Finnish ice-hockey player
