= Jim McElmury =

American ice hockey player

- Born: October 3, 1949 (age 76) Saint Paul, Minnesota, U.S.
- Height: 6 ft 1 in (185 cm)
- Weight: 190 lb (86 kg; 13 st 8 lb)
- Position: Defense
- Shot: Left
- Played for: Minnesota North Stars; Kansas City Scouts; Colorado Rockies
- National team: United States
- NHL draft: Undrafted
- Playing career: 1969–1978

James Donald McElmury (born October 3, 1949, in Saint Paul, Minnesota) is an American retired professional ice hockey player who played 180 games in the National Hockey League between 1972 and 1978 for the Minnesota North Stars, Kansas City Scouts, and Colorado Rockies. Prior to turning professional McElmury played for Bemidji State University. Internationally McElmury played for the American national team at several World Championships and the 1972 Winter Olympics.

== Playing career ==
He played with the Minnesota North Stars, Kansas City Scouts and the Colorado Rockies after starring for the Bemidji State University ice hockey team. Aside from playing in the NHL McElmury spent time in various minor leagues, primarily the American Hockey League.

== International play ==
Medal record

Men's ice hockey

Representing United States

Olympic Games
Silver medal – second place	1972 Sapporo	Team

McElmury played for the American national team several times during his career. His first tournament was the 1970 World Championship, where the United States played in Pool B, the second tier. The Americans were promoted for the 1971 World Championship and McElmury returned for that, playing 10 games and scoring 2 goals. He also played at the 1972 Winter Olympics, helping the United States win a silver medal; McElmury played 6 games and had 1 assist. McElmury's last international tournament was the 1977 World Championships, recording 5 points in 10 games.

== Career statistics ==
=== Regular season and playoffs ===
			Regular season					Playoffs
Season	Team	League	GP	G	A	Pts	PIM	GP	G	A	Pts	PIM
1966–67	Frank B. Kellogg High School	HS-MN	—	—	—	—	—	—	—	—	—	—
1967–68	Bemidji State University	NCAA	—	—	—	—	—	—	—	—	—	—
1968–69	Bemidji State University	NCAA	—	—	—	—	—	—	—	—	—	—
1969–70	Bemidji State University	NCAA	—	—	—	—	—	—	—	—	—	—
1970–71	Bemidji State University	NCAA	12	5	5	10	20	—	—	—	—	—
1971–72	Cleveland Barons	AHL	15	2	2	4	4	6	0	3	3	10
1972–73	Minnesota North Stars	NHL	7	0	1	1	2	—	—	—	—	—
1972–73	Cleveland/Jacksonville Barons	AHL	69	4	23	27	20	—	—	—	—	—
1973–74	Portland Buckaroos	WHL	76	8	23	31	46	10	1	6	7	2
1974–75	Kansas City Scouts	NHL	78	5	17	22	25	—	—	—	—	—
1975–76	Springfield Indians	AHL	36	4	12	16	10	—	—	—	—	—
1975–76	Kansas City Scouts	NHL	38	2	6	8	6	—	—	—	—	—
1976–77	Rhode Island Reds	AHL	24	3	13	16	16	—	—	—	—	—
1976–77	Colorado Rockies	NHL	55	7	23	30	16	—	—	—	—	—
1977–78	Colorado Rockies	NHL	2	0	0	0	0	—	—	—	—	—
1977–78	Phoenix Roadrunners	CHL	12	0	3	3	8	—	—	—	—	—
1977–78	Hampton Gulls	AHL	11	1	7	8	4	—	—	—	—	—
AHL totals			155	14	57	71	54	6	0	3	3	10
NHL totals			180	14	47	61	49	—	—	—	—	—

=== International ===
Year	Team	Event	GP	G	A	Pts	PIM
1970	United States	WC-B	—	—	—	—	—
1971	United States	WC	10	2	0	2	2
1972	United States	Oly	6	0	1	1	6
1977	United States	WC	10	2	3	5	10
Senior totals			26	4	4	8	18
