= Miroslav Přerost =

Czech ice hockey player and coach

- Born: 1963
- Position: Forward
- Shot: Left
- Played for: HC Plzen (Czech Extraliga)
- NHL draft: Undrafted
- Playing career: 1982–1983

Miroslav Přerost (born 1963) is a Czech former professional ice hockey forward who played with HC Plzen during the 1982–83 Czech Extraliga season. He is currently the head coach of the Czech Republic men's national junior ice hockey team. Having been head coach of HC Plzeň, HC Baník Sokolov, HC Klatovy, Bad Reichenhall EHC (Germany) and Lillehammer IK (Norway), he coached the Czech junior team at the 2012, 2013 and the 2014 World Junior Ice Hockey Championships.
