= Albert Mächler =

Swiss biathlete (born 1950)

Personal information
- Nationality: Swiss
- Born: 20 March 1950 (age 75)

Sport
- Sport: Biathlon

Albert Mächler (born 20 March 1950) is a Swiss biathlete. He competed in the 20 km individual event at the 1976 Winter Olympics.
