= Iliya Todorov =

Bulgarian biathlete (born 1953)

Personal information
- Nationality: Bulgarian
- Born: 16 July 1953 (age 71)

Sport
- Sport: Biathlon

Iliya Todorov (born 16 July 1953) is a Bulgarian biathlete. He competed in the 20 km individual event at the 1976 Winter Olympics.
