= Karl-Heinz Egger =

German ice hockey player

Personal information
- Nationality: German
- Born: 2 October 1949 (age 75); Landsberg am Lech, West Germany

Sport
- Sport: Ice hockey

Karl-Heinz Egger (born 2 October 1949) is a German ice hockey player. He competed in the men's tournament at the 1972 Winter Olympics.
