= Heikki Järn =

Finnish ice hockey player

Personal information
- Nationality: Finnish
- Born: 23 September 1941 (age 83); Karkkila, Finland

Sport
- Sport: Ice hockey

Heikki Järn (born 23 September 1941) is a Finnish ice hockey player. He competed in the men's tournament at the 1972 Winter Olympics.
