= Východná =

- Municipality
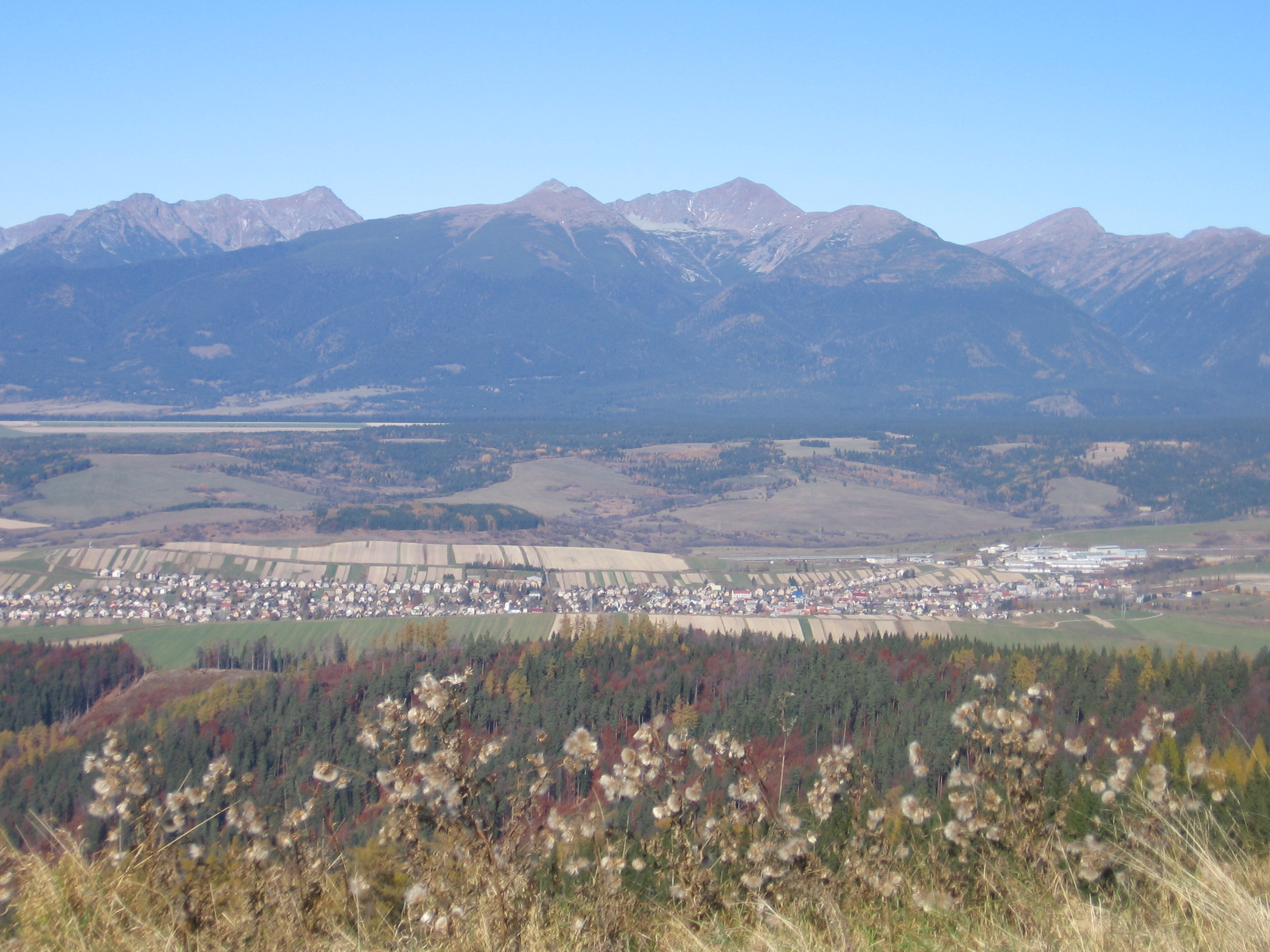

- Flag

- Location of Východná in the Žilina Region Location of Východná in Slovakia
- Coordinates: 49.07°N 19.90°E
- Country: Slovakia
- Region: Žilina Region
- District: Liptovský Mikuláš District
- First mentioned: 1269

Area
  - Total: 41.97 km^{2} (16.20 sq mi)
- Elevation: 760 m (2,490 ft)

Population (2025)
  - Total: 2,218
- Time zone: UTC+1 (CET)
  - Summer (DST): UTC+2 (CEST)
- Postal code: 323 2
- Area code: +421 44
- Vehicle registration plate (until 2022): LM
- Website: www.vychodna.eu

Východná (Hungarian: Vichodna) is a village and municipality in Liptovský Mikuláš District in the Žilina Region of northern Slovakia.

== History ==
In historical records the village was first mentioned in 1269, at the foot of Kriváň, Slovakia's symbolic and often considered most beautiful mountain. Before the establishment of independent Czechoslovakia in 1918, Východná was part of Liptó County within the Kingdom of Hungary. From 1939 to 1945, it was part of the Slovak Republic.

== Culture ==
Východná is home to one of the major folklore festivals in the country.

The festival has been organised since 1953 in the large open-air theatre overlooking the village early in the summer, usually during the first weekend of July. In 2006–2007, the premises of the open-air theatre were largely reconstructed.

The festival is held as part of the programmes of the International Council of Organizations for Folklore Festivals and Folk Art (C.I.O.F.F.). Every year it welcomes an average of 1,500 performers, and the number of visitors reaches 70,000 people. The magnificent scenic programme in the open-air theatre during the three festival days is completed by minor programmes, exhibitions and accompanying events engaging the visitors right into the centre of happening.

== Geography ==
The municipality lies at an altitude of 760 metres (2,490 ft) and covers an area of 41.97 km^{2} (16.20 sq mi) (2025).

== Population ==
Population statistic (10 years)
| Year | 1995 | 2005 | 2015 | 2025 |
|---|---|---|---|---|
| Count | 2362 | 2324 | 2144 | 2218 |
| Difference | | −1.60% | −7.74% | +3.45% |

Population statistic
| Year | 2024 | 2025 |
|---|---|---|
| Count | 2226 | 2218 |
| Difference | | −0.35% |

It has a population of 2218 people (31 December 2025).

=== Ethnicity ===
Census 2021 (1+ %)
| Ethnicity | Number | Fraction |
|---|---|---|
| Slovak | 2155 | 96.98% |
| Romani | 124 | 5.58% |
| Not found out | 48 | 2.16% |
| Total | 2222 | |

In year 2021 was 2222 people by ethnicity 2155 as Slovak, 124 as Romani, 48 as Not found out, 8 as Czech, 5 as Polish, 5 as Hungarian, 4 as Other, 2 as German, 1 as Ukrainian and 1 as Rusyn.

Note on population: The difference values of population numbers in the table "Population statistic" and in the sections "Ethnicity" & "Religion" is caused by the use of various statistical methods.

=== Religion ===
Census 2021 (1+ %)
| Religion | Number | Fraction |
|---|---|---|
| Evangelical Church | 1168 | 52.57% |
| Roman Catholic Church | 600 | 27% |
| None | 327 | 14.72% |
| Not found out | 50 | 2.25% |
| Christian Congregations in Slovakia | 25 | 1.13% |
| Total | 2222 | |

In year 2021 was 2222 people by religion 1168 from Evangelical Church, 600 from Roman Catholic Church, 327 from None, 50 from Not found out, 25 from Christian Congregations in Slovakia, 13 from Greek Catholic Church, 8 from Seventh-day Adventist Church, 7 from Other, 6 from Baptists Church, 3 from Islam, 3 from United Methodist Church, 2 from Old Catholic Church, 2 from Eastern Orthodox Church, 2 from Other and not ascertained christian church, 2 from Jehovah's Witnesses, 2 from Ad hoc movements, 1 from Paganism and natural spirituality and 1 from Church of the Brethren.

== Notable people ==
- Ján Michalko (1947–2024), cross-country skier.
