= Hansruedi Süssli =

Swiss biathlete (born 1951)

Personal information
- Nationality: Swiss
- Born: 22 August 1951 (age 73)

Sport
- Sport: Biathlon

Hansruedi Süssli (born 22 August 1951) is a Swiss biathlete. He competed in the 20 km individual event at the 1976 Winter Olympics.
