= Christian Danuser =

Swiss biathlete (born 1953)

Personal information
- Nationality: Swiss
- Born: 25 November 1953 (age 71)

Sport
- Sport: Biathlon

Christian Danuser (born 25 November 1953) is a Swiss biathlete. He competed in the 20 km individual event at the 1976 Winter Olympics.
