= Johann Eimansberger =

German ice hockey player

Personal information
- Nationality: German
- Born: 13 September 1946 (age 78); Bad Tölz, Germany

Sport
- Sport: Ice hockey

Johann Eimansberger (born 13 September 1946) is a German ice hockey player. He competed in the men's tournament at the 1972 Winter Olympics.
