= Khristo Madzharov =

Bulgarian biathlete (born 1943)

Personal information
- Nationality: Bulgarian
- Born: 28 March 1943 (age 82)

Sport
- Sport: Biathlon

Khristo Madzharov (born 28 March 1943) is a Bulgarian biathlete. He competed in the 20 km individual event at the 1976 Winter Olympics.
