= Werner Modes =

German ice hockey player

Personal information
- Nationality: German
- Born: 12 September 1949 (age 75); Füssen, West Germany

Sport
- Sport: Ice hockey

Werner Modes (born 12 September 1949) is a German ice hockey player. He competed in the men's tournament at the 1972 Winter Olympics.
