= Håkan Pettersson (ice hockey) =

Swedish ice hockey player

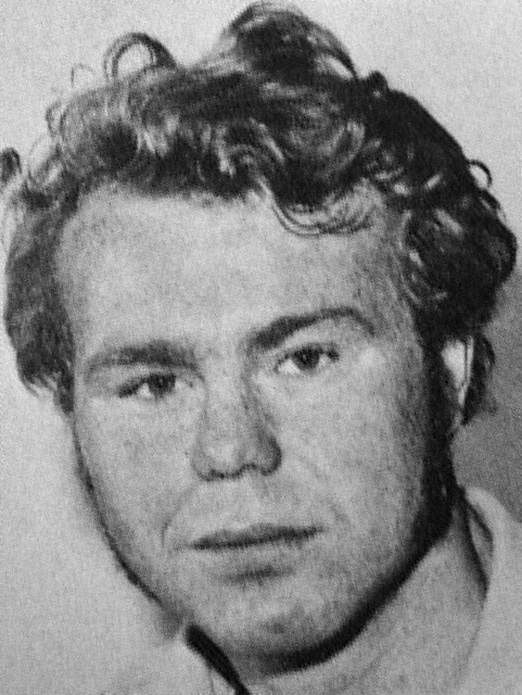
- Born: 11 May 1949 Sundsvall, Sweden
- Died: 10 May 2008 (aged 58) Sundsvall, Sweden
- Height: 6 ft 1 in (185 cm)
- Weight: 183 lb (83 kg; 13 st 1 lb)
- Position: Forward
- Shot: Left
- Played for: Timrå IK
- National team: Sweden
- NHL draft: Undrafted
- Playing career: 1967–1982

Håkan Pettersson (11 May 1949 – 10 May 2008) was a Swedish professional ice hockey player.

He competed as a member of the Sweden men's national ice hockey team at the 1972 Winter Olympics held in Japan.
