= Anton Hofherr =

German ice hockey player (1947–2024)

Personal information
- Nationality: German
- Born: 20 December 1947 Garmisch-Partenkirchen, Germany
- Died: 18 September 2024 (aged 76) Garmisch-Partenkirchen, Germany

Sport
- Sport: Ice hockey

Anton Hofherr (20 December 1947 – 18 September 2024) was a German ice hockey player. He competed in the men's tournament at the 1972 Winter Olympics.
