= Karl-Heinz Wolf =

German biathlete

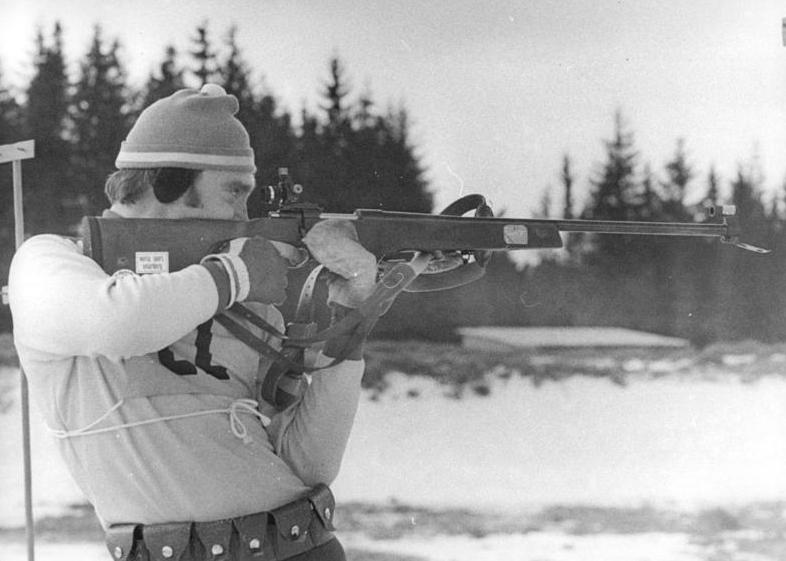
- Karl-Heinz Wolf in 1976

Personal information
- Nationality: German
- Born: 4 July 1951 (age 73); Meiningen, East Germany

Sport
- Sport: Biathlon

Karl-Heinz Wolf (born 4 July 1951) is a German biathlete. He competed in the 20 km individual event at the 1976 Winter Olympics.
