= Hans Lindberg (ice hockey) =

Swedish former ice hockey player

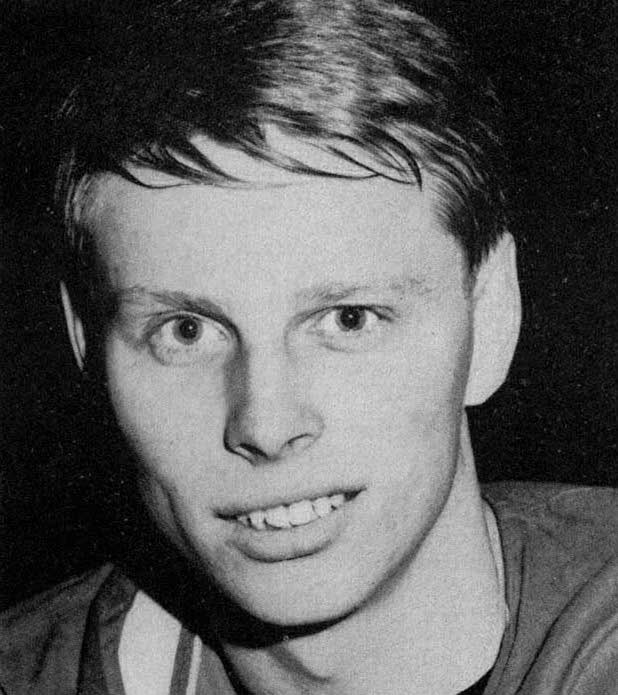
- Born: 16 January 1945 (age 81) Gävle, Sweden
- Height: 5 ft 11 in (180 cm)
- Weight: 163 lb (74 kg; 11 st 9 lb)
- Position: Winger
- Shot: Left
- Played for: Brynäs IF; AIK IF; IF Björklöven
- National team: Sweden
- Playing career: 1961–1975

Hans Lennart Brorsson Lindberg (born 16 January 1945) is a Swedish former professional ice hockey player and manager. He was nicknamed "Virus".

As a player, he played all six matches for the Sweden men's national ice hockey team at the 1972 Winter Olympics held in Japan. As a coach, he coached Team Sweden during the seasons of 1976–1977 and 1977–1978.
