= Václav Sršeň =

Czechoslovak footballer (1925–1996)

Personal information
- Date of birth: 7 June 1925
- Place of birth: Buštěhrad, Czechoslovakia
- Date of death: 30 November 1996 (aged 71)
- Position: Forward

Senior career*
Years	Team	Apps	(Gls)
1942–1947	SK Kladno		
1948–1949	ATK Prague		
1949	Sokol SONP Kladno		
1951	Svit Gottwaldov		
1952–1958	SONP/Baník Kladno		

International career
1948	Czechoslovakia	1	(0)
- * Club domestic league appearances and goals

Václav Sršeň (7 June 1925 – 30 November 1996) was a footballer. A forward, he played for Czechoslovakia, representing his country once in 1948. He made 217 appearances in the Czechoslovak First League, scoring 85 goals, between 1942 and 1958. Among other teams, he played for ATK Prague at club level.

Sršeň made his national team debut on 4 July 1948 in a match against Romania in Bucharest. He was the first player from ATK Prague to represent the national team.

== After football ==
Due to him speaking out against the Soviet occupation of Czechoslovakia, Sršeň lost his job and was unable to continue with football coaching. After 1989 he ran a Konditorei in Buštěhrad with his daughter, Olga, until his death following a short and severe illness in 1996.

== Bibliography ==
- Jeřábek, Luboš (2007). Český a československý fotbal – lexikon osobností a klubů (in Czech). Prague, Czech Republic: Grada Publishing. ISBN 978-80-247-1656-5.
- Pivoda, Aleš (2013). Legenda se vrátila. Praha: MAC. ISBN 978-80-86783-65-9.
