= Antonín Kříž (biathlete) =

Czech biathlete (1953–2025)

Personal information
- Nationality: Czech
- Born: 24 August 1953; Jilemnice, Czechoslovakia
- Died: 5 September 2025 (aged 72)

Sport
- Sport: Biathlon

Antonín Kříž (24 August 1953 – 5 September 2025) was a Czech biathlete. He competed in the 20 km individual event at the 1976 Winter Olympics.

Kříž died on 5 September 2025, at the age of 72.
