= Arnošt Hájek =

Czech biathlete (born 1941)

Personal information
- Nationality: Czech
- Born: 19 April 1941 (age 83); Přívlaky, Protectorate of Bohemia and Moravia

Sport
- Sport: Biathlon

Arnošt Hájek (born 19 April 1941) is a Czech biathlete. He competed in the 20 km individual event at the 1972 Winter Olympics.
