= Tommi Salmelainen =

Finnish ice hockey player

- Born: January 29, 1949 (age 77) Helsinki, FIN
- Height: 6 ft 1 in (185 cm)
- Weight: 191 lb (87 kg; 13 st 9 lb)
- Position: Forward
- Shot: Left
- Played for: SM-liiga; HIFK; Bundesliga; Star Bulls Rosenheim; CHL; Kansas City Blues
- NHL draft: 66th overall, 1969; St. Louis Blues
- Playing career: 1967–1981

Tommi Salmelainen (born January 29, 1949) is a [Finnish ice hockey left winger who played for HIFK. He was the first ever European drafted in the NHL entry draft in 1969 although he never did play in the National Hockey League. He was taken by the St. Louis Blues in the sixth round, 66th overall.

Tommi Salmelainen's sons Tony and Tobias were both professional ice hockey players.
