= Tobias Salmelainen =

Finnish ice hockey player

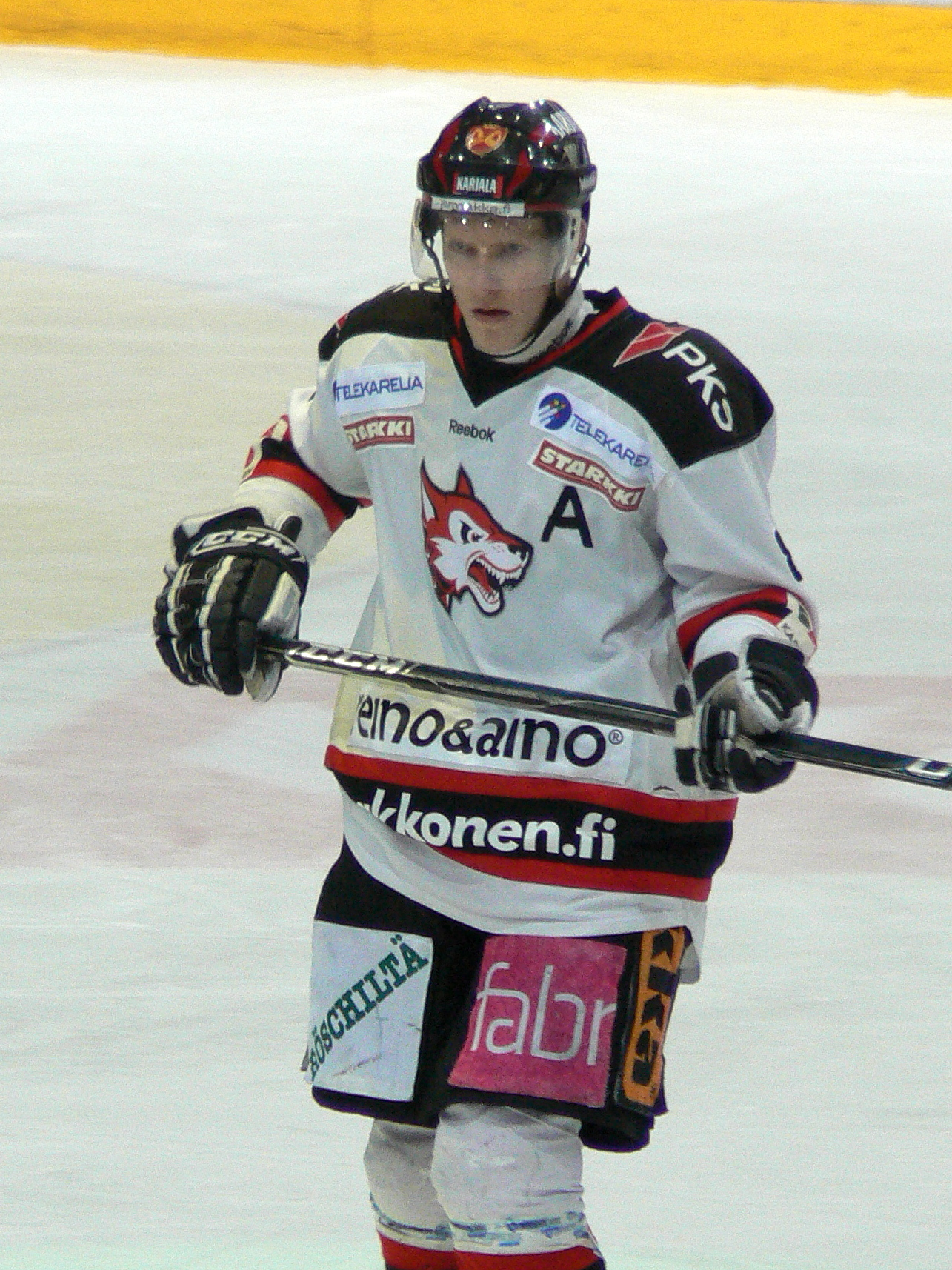
- Born: March 27, 1985 (age 39); Espoo, Finland
- Height: 5 ft 10 in (178 cm)
- Weight: 176 lb (80 kg; 12 st 8 lb)
- Position: Left wing
- Shot: Left
- Played for: Espoo Blues
- NHL draft: Undrafted
- Playing career: 2005–2013

Tobias Salmelainen (born March 27, 1985) is a Finnish former ice hockey player.

Salmelainen made his SM-liiga debut playing with HIFK during the 2005–06 SM-liiga season. His last season was with Espoo Blues during the 2012–13 SM-liiga season.
