= Bedřich Brunclík =

Czech ice hockey player

- Born: July 6, 1946 (age 78); Prague, Czechoslovakia
- Position: Forward
- Shot: Left
- Played for: HC Košice
- Playing career: 1965–1981

Bedřich Brunclík (born July 6, 1946) is a Czech former ice hockey player and coach.

Brunclík's first team was Slavia Prague (1956–65). He holds a HC Košice club record: after joining them initially as part of his national military service he played for the Slovak team for 16 seasons, scoring 237 in 583 games. He was also their head coach, and had additional appointments with teams in the Netherlands.
