= Karel Vohralík =

Czech ice hockey player (1945–1998)

Medal record

Representing Czechoslovakia

Men's Ice Hockey
Bronze medal – third place	1972 Sapporo	Team

Karel Vohralík (February 22, 1945 in Pardubice, Bohemia and Moravia – October 17, 1998 in Pardubice, Czech Republic) was an ice hockey player who played for the Czechoslovak national team. He won a bronze medal at the 1972 Winter Olympics.
