= Buštěhrad =

- Town
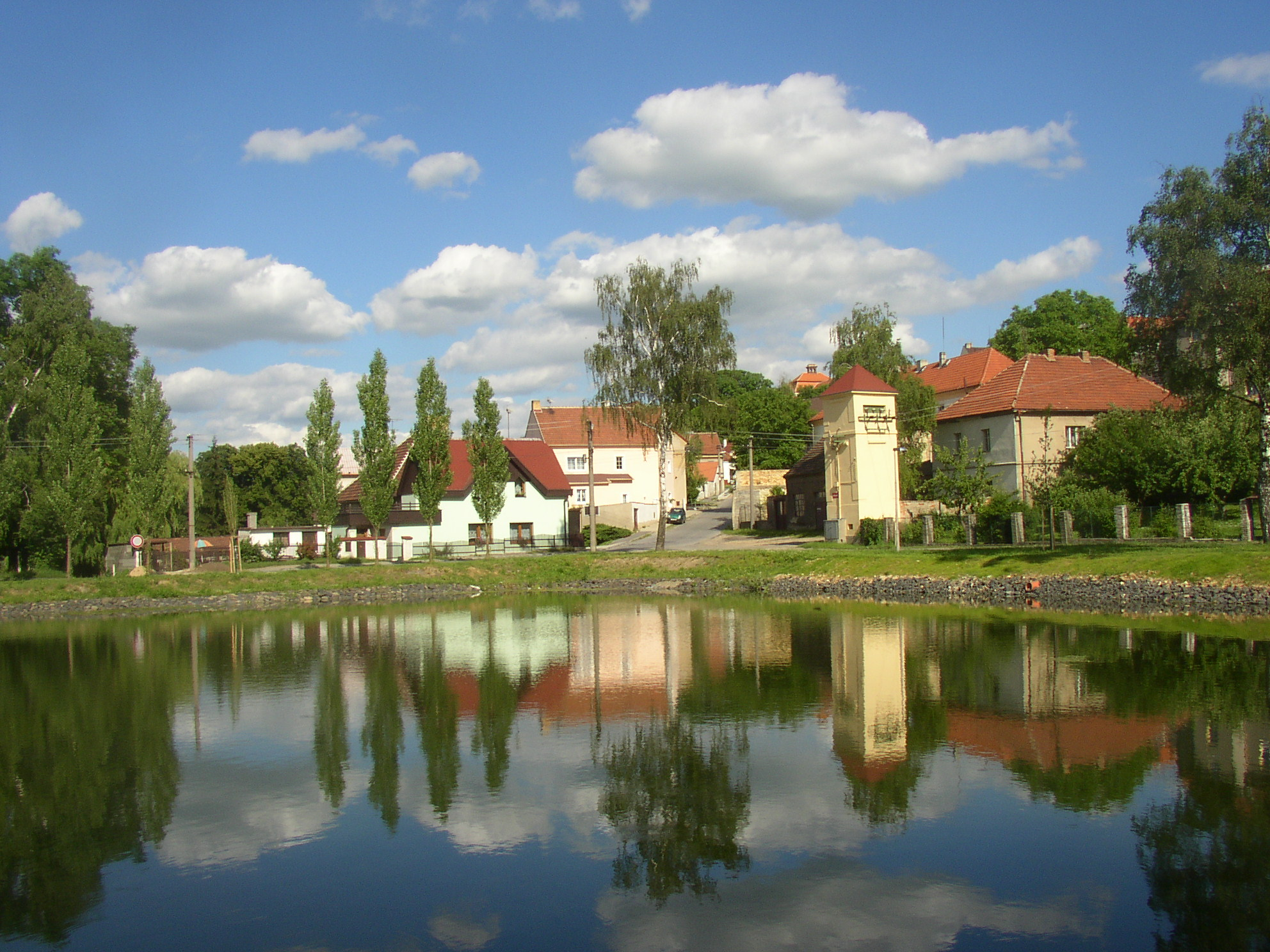
- Pond in the town centre

- Coat of arms

- Location in the Czech Republic
- Coordinates: 50°9′19″N 14°11′19″E
- Country: Czech Republic
- Region: Central Bohemian
- District: Kladno
- First mentioned: 1209

Government
  - Mayor: Daniela Javorčeková

Area
  - Total: 7.61 km^{2} (2.94 sq mi)
- Elevation: 322 m (1,056 ft)

Population (2026-01-01)
  - Total: 4,073
  - Density: 535/km^{2} (1,390/sq mi)
- Time zone: UTC+1 (CET)
  - Summer (DST): UTC+2 (CEST)
- Postal code: 273 43
- Website: www.mestobustehrad.cz

Buštěhrad (Czech pronunciation: [ˈbuʃcɛɦrat]) is a town in Kladno District in the Central Bohemian Region of the Czech Republic. It has about 4,000 inhabitants.

== Etymology ==
The settlement was originally named Buščeves, which was derived from Buškova ves (i.e. "Bušek's village"). After the village became a town, the name was changed to Buckow and the local castle was called Buštěhrad (meaning "Bušek's castle"). In the 19th century, the name of the castle was transferred to the town.

== Geography ==
Buštěhrad is located about 14 kilometres (9 mi) northwest of Prague. It lies in a flat agricultural landscape of the Prague Plateau. The stream Buštěhradský potok originates in the municipal territory, flows through the town, and supplies two small fishponds in the town centre.

== History ==
The first written mention of Buštěhrad is from 1209. In the 13th century, a fortress was built here, later rebuilt into a castle, which was one of the biggest in the kingdom in the 15th century. In 1497, Buštěhrad was promoted to a town by King Vladislaus II.

During the Thirty Years' War, the castle was destroyed. After the war, houses were built in the ruins, and it became a unique quarter, today called Starý Hrad ("Old Castle"). In the 19th century, the town developed thanks to coal mining and construction of the railway.

== Demographics ==
Historical population

Year	Pop.	±%
1869	3,055	—
1880	2,911	−4.7%
1890	3,222	+10.7%
1900	3,461	+7.4%
1910	3,981	+15.0%

Year	Pop.	±%
1921	3,334	−16.3%
1930	3,210	−3.7%
1950	2,897	−9.8%
1961	2,948	+1.8%
1970	2,714	−7.9%

Year	Pop.	±%
1980	2,676	−1.4%
1991	2,263	−15.4%
2001	2,273	+0.4%
2011	2,884	+26.9%
2021	3,859	+33.8%

Source: Censuses

== Transport ==
The D7 motorway from Prague to Chomutov leads along the eastern municipal border.

== Sights ==
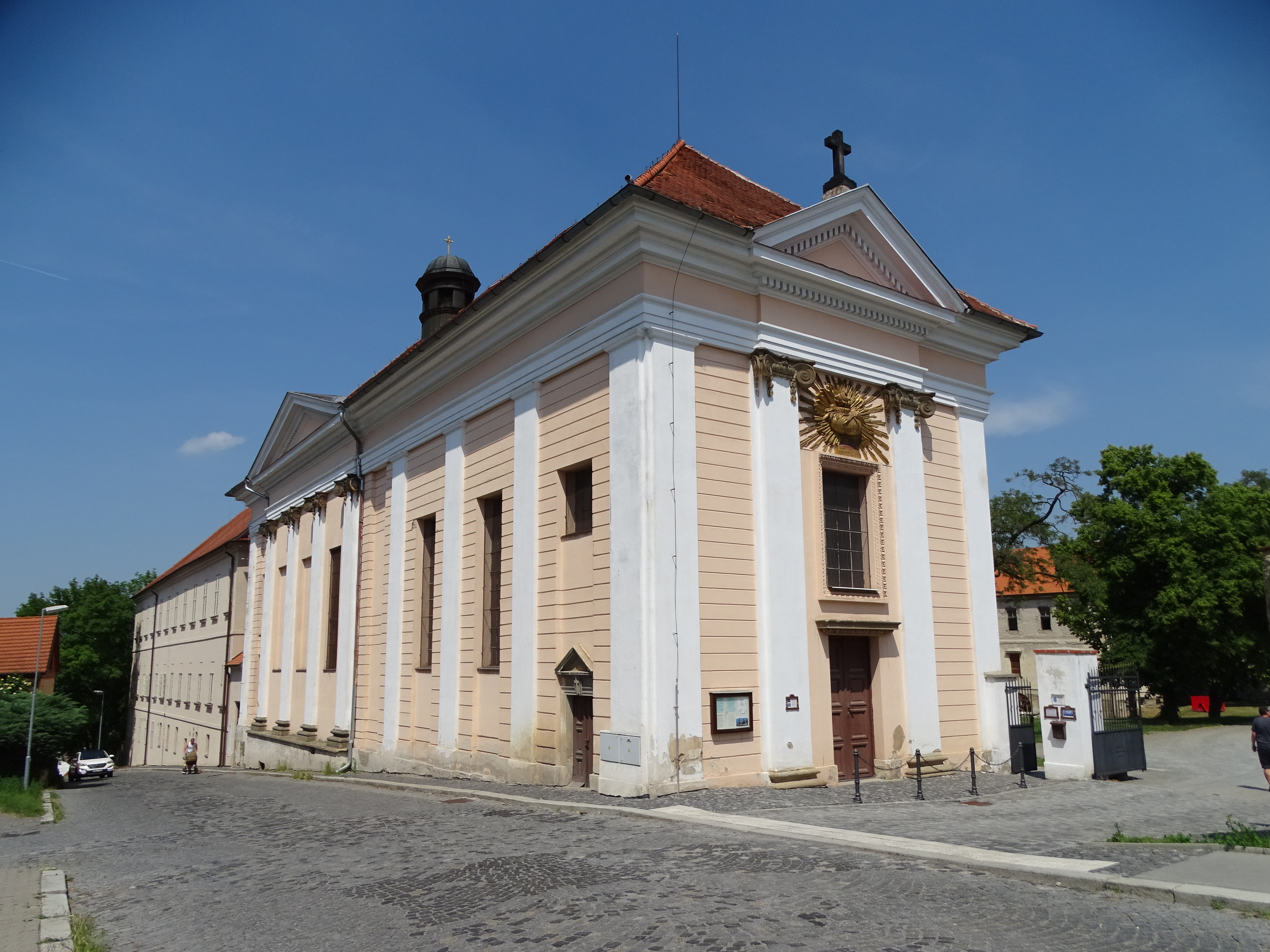
Church of the Exaltation of the Holy Cross

The most important monument is the Buštěhrad Castle. It was built in 1747–1753 by Kilian Ignaz Dientzenhofer and Anselmo Lurago. Neoclassical modifications were made in the 19th century. Today the castle is dilapidated. There is a castle park in front of the castle and a church next to the castle. The Church of the Exaltation of the Holy Cross was built in 1814–1816.

== Notable people ==
- Ota Pavel (1930–1973), writer and journalist; raised here
- Václav Sršeň (1925–1996), footballer
- Jiří Krampol (born 1938), actor
- Eduard Novák (1946–2010), ice hockey player

== Twin towns – sister cities ==
Buštěhrad is twinned with:

- Ledro, Italy
