= Richard Toomey =

American ice hockey player and coach

Biographical details
- Born: Newtonville, Massachusetts

Playing career
- 1967–1970: Boston University
- 1970–1971: US National Team
- 1970–1973: Bridgeport Home Oilers
- Position: Forward

Coaching career (HC unless noted)
- 1970–1972: Army (assistant)
- 1972–1974: Brown (assistant)
- 1974–1978: Brown

Head coaching record
- Overall: 73–44–2

Richard Toomey is an American former professional ice hockey player and coach who led Brown from 1974 to 1978.

Toomey played hockey at Newton High School and Boston University. He was BU's captain during the 1969-70 season. After graduating, he played senior ice hockey for the Bridgeport Home Oilers and played for the United States national team in the 1971 Ice Hockey World Championships.

Toomey began his coaching career as an assistant at the United States Military Academy. In 1972, he came to Brown as head coach of the freshman hockey team and assistant of the varsity team. On February 7, 1974, he was named interim varsity coach after J. Allan Soares was fired due to the on-ice "conduct of [his] players and the atmosphere surrounding the hockey program" following a game where Brown drew 11 penalties and injured three Harvard players. Brown eventually removed the interim tag and Toomey led the Bears to a 73–44–2 record, making him the school's winningest head coach at the time of his resignation in 1978.

== Career statistics ==
| | | | Regular season | | | | | Playoffs |
| Season | Team | League | GP | G | A | Pts | PIM | GP | G | A | Pts | PIM |
|---|---|---|---|---|---|---|---|---|---|---|---|---|
| 1967–68 | Boston University | ECAC Hockey | 31 | 19 | 20 | 39 | 6 | — | — | — | — | — |
| 1968–69 | Boston University | ECAC Hockey | 28 | 17 | 26 | 43 | 2 | — | — | — | — | — |
| 1969–70 | Boston University | ECAC Hockey | 27 | 15 | 18 | 33 | 2 | — | — | — | — | — |
| NCAA totals | | | 86 | 51 | 64 | 115 | 10 | — | — | — | — | — |

== Head coaching record ==
=== College ===
Record table
| Season | Team | Overall | Conference | Standing | Postseason |
|---|---|---|---|---|---|
Brown Bears (ECAC Hockey) (1974–1978)
| 1973–74 | Brown | 5-3-0 | 2-1-0 | 13th | |
| 1974–75 | Brown | 15-9-1 | 13-8-1 | 7th | ECAC Quarterfinals |
| 1975–76 | Brown | 23-7-0 | 18-5-0 | 3rd | NCAA consolation game (win) |
| 1976–77 | Brown | 16-11-0 | 12-9-0 | 7th | ECAC Quarterfinals |
| 1977–78 | Brown | 14-14-1 | 13-9-1 | 6th | ECAC third-place game (loss) |
| Brown: | | 73-44-2 | 58-32-2 | | |
| Total: | | 68-41-2 | | | |
National champion Postseason invitational champion Conference regular season champion Conference regular season and conference tournament champion Division regular season champion Division regular season and conference tournament champion Conference tournament champion
