= Miloslav Sochor =

Czech alpine skier (born 1952)

Personal information
- Nationality: Czech
- Born: 8 January 1952 (age 73); Pec pod Sněžkou, Czechoslovakia

Sport
- Sport: Alpine skiing

Miloslav Sochor (born 8 January 1952) is a Czech alpine skier. He competed in three events at the 1976 Winter Olympics.
