= Alois Kanamüller =

German biathlete

Personal information
- Nationality: German
- Born: 14 August 1952 (age 72); Freyung, West Germany

Sport
- Sport: Biathlon

Alois Kanamüller (born 14 August 1952) is a German biathlete. He competed at the 1976 Winter Olympics and the 1980 Winter Olympics.
