= Pavel Ploc (biathlete) =

Czech biathlete (1943–2024)

Personal information
- Nationality: Czech
- Born: 26 December 1943 Pardubice, Protectorate of Bohemia and Moravia
- Died: 3 February 2024 (aged 80)

Sport
- Sport: Biathlon

Pavel Ploc (26 December 1943 – 3 February 2024) was a Czech biathlete. He competed at the 1968 Winter Olympics and the 1972 Winter Olympics.

Ploc died on 3 February 2024, at the age of 80.
