= Ilpo Koskela =

Finnish ice hockey player

Ilpo Kaarlo Koskela (January 29, 1945 – August 9, 1997) was a Finnish professional ice hockey player who played in the SM-liiga. He was born in Janakkala, and played for Reipas Lahti, Jokerit, and Kiekkoreipas Lahti. He was inducted into the Finnish Hockey Hall of Fame in 1989. He also competed at the 1968 Winter Olympics and the 1972 Winter Olympics. He died in Sysmä, age 52.
