= Milena Chlumová =

Czech cross-country skier

Personal information
- Nationality: Czech
- Born: 1 June 1946 (age 79) Vrchlabí, Czechoslovakia

Sport
- Sport: Cross-country skiing

Milena Chlumová (born 1 June 1946) is a Czech former cross-country skier. She competed in two events at the 1972 Winter Olympics.

== Cross-country skiing results ==
=== Olympic Games ===
Year	Age	5 km	10 km	3 × 5 km relay
1972	25	27	26	—

=== World Championships ===
Year	Age	5 km	10 km	3 × 5 km relay
1970	23	—	—	5
