= Žilina (Kladno District) =

- Municipality
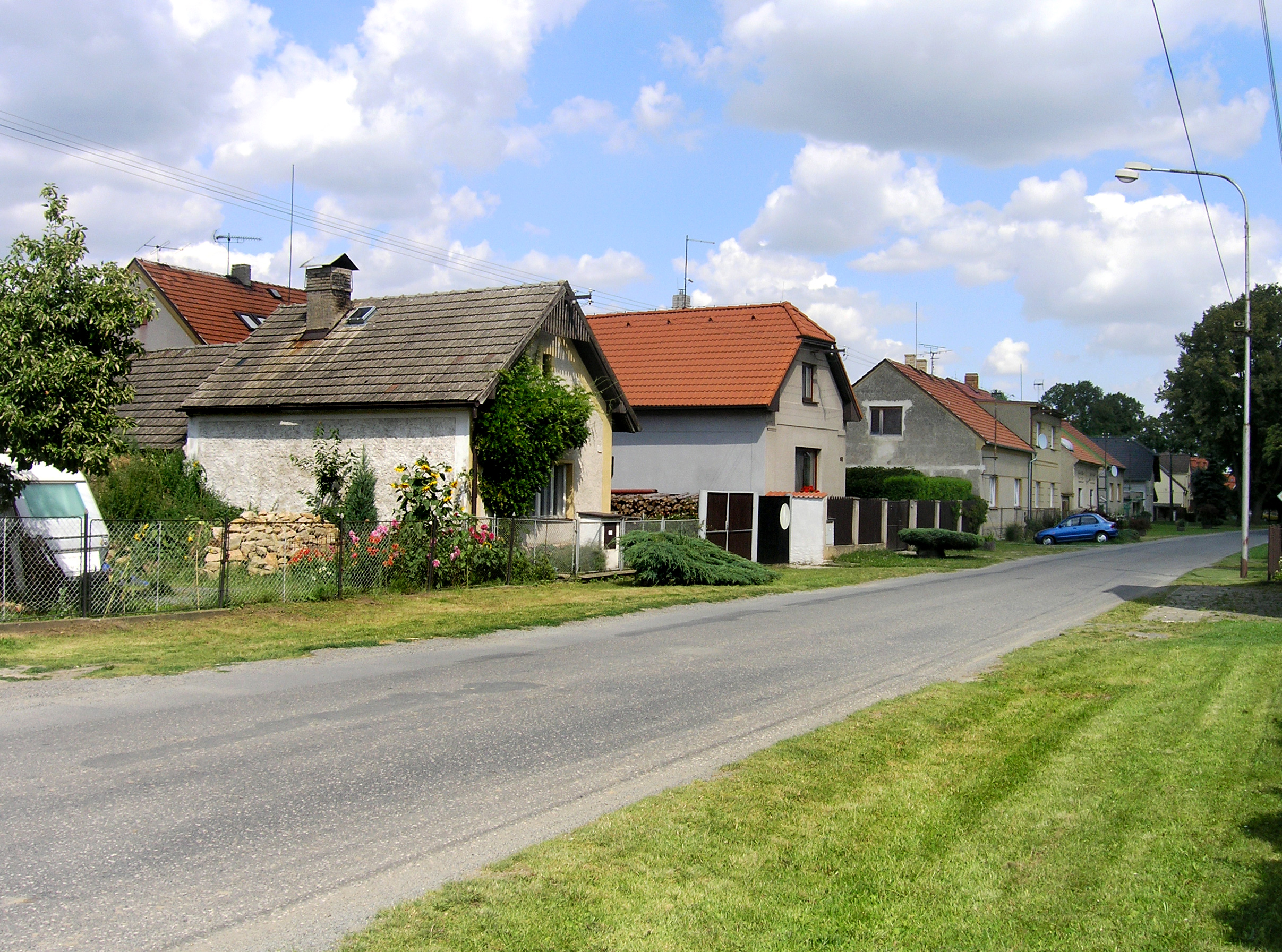
- Žilinská street

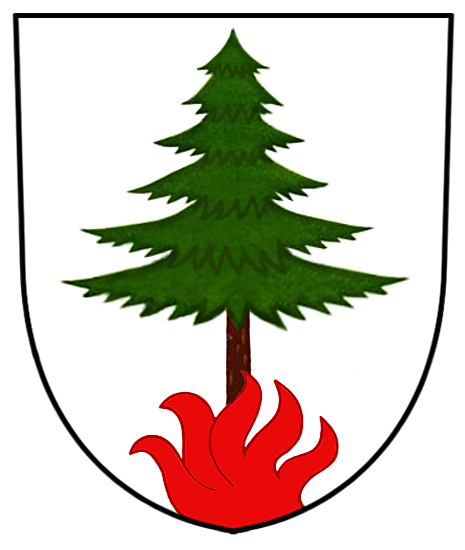
- Flag Coat of arms

- Location in the Czech Republic
- Coordinates: 50°6′0″N 14°0′21″E
- Country: Czech Republic
- Region: Central Bohemian
- District: Kladno
- First mentioned: 1352

Area
  - Total: 7.86 km^{2} (3.03 sq mi)
- Elevation: 394 m (1,293 ft)

Population (2026-01-01)
  - Total: 844
  - Density: 107/km^{2} (278/sq mi)
- Time zone: UTC+1 (CET)
  - Summer (DST): UTC+2 (CEST)
- Postal code: 273 01
- Website: www.zilina-obec.cz

Žilina is municipality and village in Kladno District in the Central Bohemian Region of the Czech Republic. It has about 800 inhabitants.

== Demographics ==
Historical population
Year	Pop.	±%
1869	556	—
1880	567	+2.0%
1890	632	+11.5%
1900	621	−1.7%
1910	700	+12.7%
1921	685	−2.1%
1930	714	+4.2%
1950	668	−6.4%
1961	689	+3.1%
1970	681	−1.2%
1980	705	+3.5%
1991	655	−7.1%
2001	699	+6.7%
2011	860	+23.0%
2021	798	−7.2%
Source: Censuses

== Notable people ==
- Josef Horešovský (1946–2025), ice hockey player
