= Milena Cillerová =

Czech cross-country skier

Personal information
- Nationality: Czech
- Born: 12 August 1945 (age 80) Jilemnice, Czechoslovakia

Sport
- Sport: Cross-country skiing

Milena Cillerová (born 12 August 1945) is a Czech former cross-country skier. She competed in three events at the 1972 Winter Olympics.

== Cross-country skiing results ==
=== Olympic Games ===
Year	Age	5 km	10 km	3 × 5 km relay
1972	26	22	30	6

=== World Championships ===
Year	Age	5 km	10 km	3 × 5 km relay
1970	24	—	—	5
