= Ondřej Malinský =

Czech ice hockey player

- Born: April 7, 1983 (age 42)
- Height: 6 ft 2 in (188 cm)
- Weight: 187 lb (85 kg; 13 st 5 lb)
- Position: Defence
- Shoots: Left
- Czech Extraliga team: HC Zlín
- Playing career: 2002–present

Ondřej Malinský (born April 7, 1983) is a Czech professional ice hockey defenceman. He played with HC Zlín in the Czech Extraliga during the 2010–11 Czech Extraliga season.

== Career statistics ==
			Regular season					Playoffs
Season	Team	League	GP	G	A	Pts	PIM	GP	G	A	Pts	PIM
1999–00	HC Sparta Praha U18	Czech U18	43	3	19	22	22	7	0	2	2	6
2000–01	HC Sparta Praha U20	Czech U20	38	1	2	3	14	2	0	0	0	0
2001–02	HC Sparta Praha U20	Czech U20	42	4	11	15	89	6	2	2	4	4
2002–03	HC Sparta Praha U20	Czech U20	52	5	17	22	79	2	0	0	0	0
2002–03	HC Sparta Praha	Czech	6	0	1	1	4	—	—	—	—	—
2003–04	HC Slovan Ústečtí Lvi U20	Czech U20	8	2	2	4	12	—	—	—	—	—
2003–04	HC Prostějov U20	Czech U20	6	3	1	4	14	3	1	1	2	2
2003–04	HC Slovan Ústečtí Lvi	Czech2	18	2	1	3	4	—	—	—	—	—
2003–04	HC Prostějov	Czech2	14	0	2	2	8	—	—	—	—	—
2004–05	HC Sparta Praha	Czech	1	0	0	0	0	—	—	—	—	—
2004–05	IHC Písek	Czech2	47	1	8	9	58	—	—	—	—	—
2005–06	HC Sparta Praha	Czech	16	0	0	0	14	—	—	—	—	—
2005–06	HC Havířov Panthers	Czech2	32	0	3	3	16	6	0	1	1	12
2006–07	KLH Chomutov	Czech2	44	2	8	10	57	13	0	1	1	14
2007–08	KLH Chomutov	Czech2	39	3	12	15	38	—	—	—	—	—
2007–08	HC Berounští Medvědi	Czech2	4	0	0	0	4	—	—	—	—	—
2008–09	HK SKP Poprad	Slovak	58	2	3	5	36	—	—	—	—	—
2009–10	KLH Chomutov	Czech2	44	2	6	8	32	—	—	—	—	—
2010–11	SK Horácká Slavia Třebíč	Czech2	37	6	7	13	28	4	0	0	0	4
2010–11	HC Zlín	Czech	—	—	—	—	—	2	0	0	0	0
2011–12	SK Kadaň	Czech2	52	1	12	13	89	—	—	—	—	—
2012–13	NED Hockey Nymburk	Czech3	35	3	19	22	32	5	1	0	1	4
2013–14	HC Poděbrady	Czech4	18	4	6	10	43	—	—	—	—	—
2014–15	HC Poděbrady	Czech4	—	—	—	—	—	—	—	—	—	—
Czech totals			23	0	1	1	18	2	0	0	0	0
Czech2 totals			331	17	59	76	334	23	0	2	2	20
