= Ján Michalko =

Slovak cross-country skier (1947–2024)

Personal information
- Nationality: Slovak
- Born: 18 November 1947 Východná, Czechoslovakia
- Died: 24 September 2024 (aged 76) Slovakia

Sport
- Sport: Cross-country skiing

Ján Michalko (18 November 1947 – 22 September 2024) was a Slovak cross-country skier. He competed for Czechoslovakia at the 1972 Winter Olympics and the 1976 Winter Olympics.

Michalko studied to be an electrotechnician at SOU elektrotechnické in Liptovský Hrádok. Michalko was the inaugural winner of Biela stopa SNP race in Kremnica in 1974, repeating the victory in 1977. In 1975/76 World Cup season, he won bronze with František Šimon and Milan Jarý in Davos 3 × 10 kilometers relay race. As an athlete of Červená hviezda Štrbské Pleso club, he was a member of Public Security from 1967 onwards. After retirement, he was the chief of police in Dolný Kubín. Between 1990 and 1992, he served as deputy Minister of Interior to Vladimír Mečiar, who recalled him failing to follow orders. On 1 September 1999, Ladislav Pittner promoted him into a rank of General.

Michalko died in Slovakia on 22 September 2024, at the age of 76.
