= Bernd Kuhn =

German ice hockey player

Personal information
- Nationality: German
- Born: 17 August 1944 (age 80); Füssen, Germany

Sport
- Sport: Ice hockey

Bernd Kuhn (born 17 August 1944) is a German former ice hockey player. He competed in the men's tournaments at the 1968 Winter Olympics and the 1972 Winter Olympics.
