= Josef Malínský =

Czech biathlete (born 1953)

Personal information
- Nationality: Czech
- Born: 20 July 1953 (age 71); Horní Branná, Czechoslovakia

Sport
- Sport: Biathlon

Josef Malínský (born 20 July 1953) is a Czech biathlete. He competed in the 20 km individual event at the 1976 Winter Olympics.
