= Stanislav Henych =

Medal record

World Championships

Men's cross-country skiing
Silver medal – second place	1974 Falun	50 km

Stanislav Henych (born 19 February 1949 in Jilemnice) is a Czech former cross-country skier who competed for Czechoslovakia during the 1970s. He won a silver medal in the 50 km at the 1974 FIS Nordic World Ski Championships in Falun. His best olympic placing was 8th in the 4×10 km event at the 1972 Winter Olympics in Sapporo.
