= Richard Farda =

Czech ice hockey player

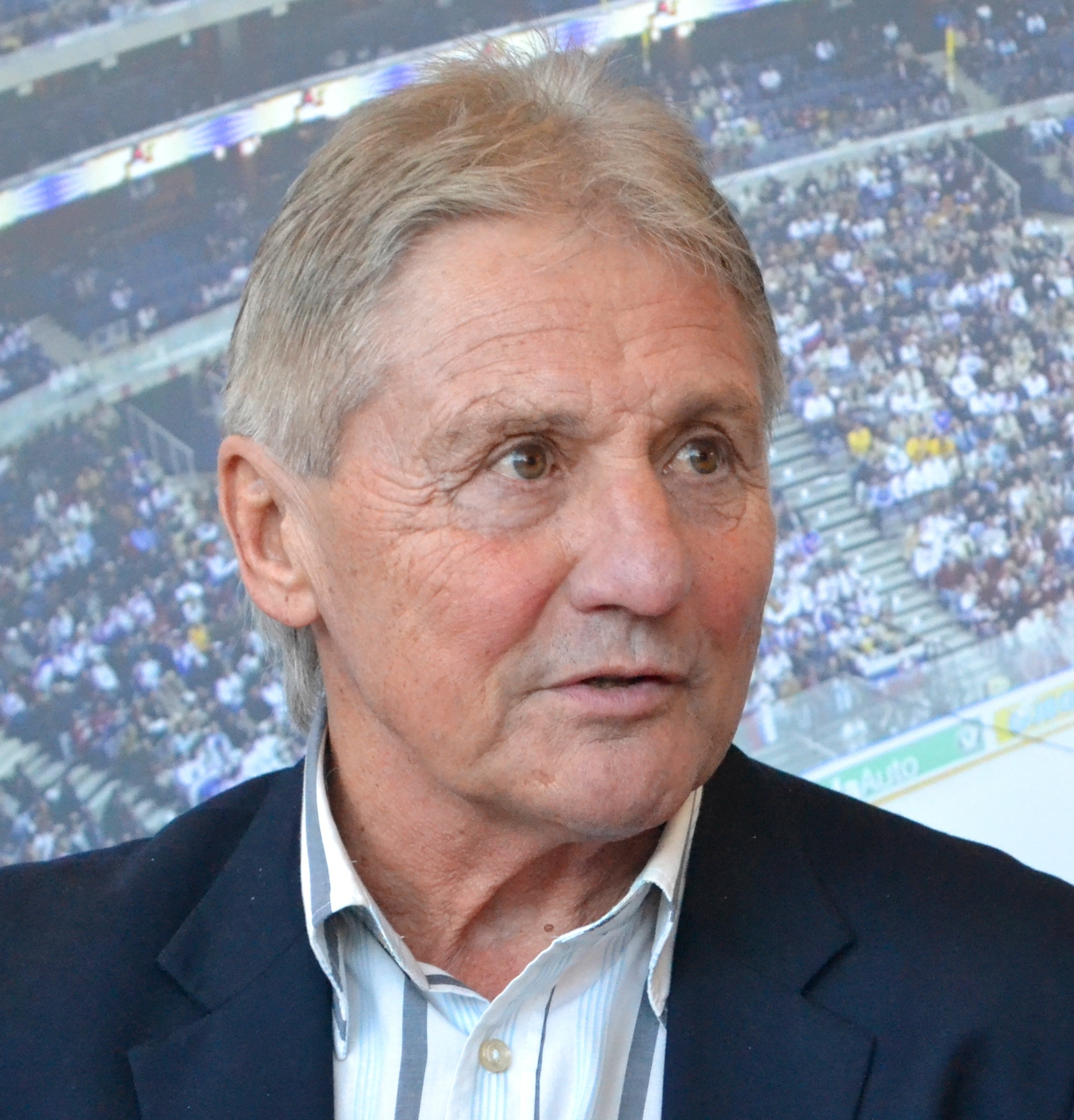
- Born: November 8, 1945 (age 80) Brno, Czechoslovakia
- Height: 5 ft 9 in (175 cm)
- Weight: 165 lb (75 kg; 11 st 11 lb)
- Position: Centre
- Shot: Left
- Played for: Toronto Toros; Birmingham Bulls
- National team: Czechoslovakia
- Playing career: 1962–1982

Olympic medal record

Representing Czechoslovakia

Men's Ice hockey
Bronze medal – third place	1972 Sapporo	Ice hockey

Richard Farda (born November 8, 1945, in Brno, Czechoslovakia) is a retired professional ice hockey player who played in the Czechoslovak Extraliga and World Hockey Association. He played for HC Brno, Toronto Toros, and Birmingham Bulls. He won a bronze medal at the 1972 Winter Olympics.

== Career statistics ==
=== Regular season and playoffs ===
			Regular season					Playoffs
Season	Team	League	GP	G	A	Pts	PIM	GP	G	A	Pts	PIM
1974-75	Toronto Toros	WHA	66	6	25	31	2	1	0	0	0	0
1975-76	Toronto Toros	WHA	63	19	35	54	8	—	—	—	—	—
1976-77	Birmingham Bulls	WHA	48	9	26	35	2	—	—	—	—	—
WHA totals			177	34	86	120	12	1	0	0	0	0
