= Josef Horešovský =

Czech ice hockey player and coach (1946–2025)

Personal information
- Born: 18 July 1946 Žilina, Czechoslovakia
- Died: 15 December 2025 (aged 79) Czech Republic

Sport
- Sport: Ice hockey
- Position: Defenceman
- Team: HC Dukla Jihlava; HC Sparta Praha
Medal record
Representing Czechoslovakia
Men's Ice hockey
Silver medal – second place	1968 Grenoble	Ice hockey
Bronze medal – third place	1972 Sapporo	Ice hockey

Josef Horešovský (18 July 1946 – 15 December 2025) was a Czech professional ice hockey player and coach, who played in the Czechoslovak Extraliga. He played for HC Dukla Jihlava and HC Sparta Praha. Horešovský won a silver medal at the 1968 Winter Olympics and a bronze medal at the 1972 Winter Olympics.

Horešovský died on 15 December 2025, at the age of 79.
