= Rudolf Tajcnár =

Slovak ice hockey player

- Born: April 17, 1948 Bratislava, Czechoslovakia
- Died: August 2, 2005 (aged 57) Bratislava, Slovakia
- Height: 5 ft 10 in (178 cm)
- Weight: 178 lb (81 kg; 12 st 10 lb)
- Position: Defence
- Shot: Left
- Played for: CZK Extraliga; HC Slovan Bratislava; WHA; Edmonton Oilers; SUI Nat B HC Ambrì-Piotta
- National team: Czechoslovakia
- Playing career: 1970–1986

Olympic medal record

Representing Czechoslovakia

Men's Ice Hockey
Bronze medal – third place	1972 Sapporo	Team

Rudolf "Rudy" Tajcnár (April 17, 1948 – August 2, 2005) was a Slovak ice hockey player who played for the Czechoslovak national team. He won a bronze medal at the 1972 Winter Olympics.

Tajcnár played two games in the World Hockey Association with the Edmonton Oilers during the 1978–79 season.

== Career statistics ==
=== Regular season and playoffs ===
			Regular season					Playoffs
Season	Team	League	GP	G	A	Pts	PIM	GP	G	A	Pts	PIM
1968–69	Czech National Team	Intl	Statistics Unavailable
1977–78	Maine Mariners	AHL	63	7	32	39	83	12	3	3	6	24
1978–79	Spokane Flyers	PHL	24	6	24	30	17	—	—	—	—	—
1978–79	Edmonton Oilers	WHA	2	0	0	0	0	—	—	—	—	—
WHA totals			2	0	0	0	0	–	–	–	–	–
