= Vladimír Bednář =

Czech ice hockey player

Personal information
- Nationality: Czech
- Born: 1 October 1948 (age 77) Beroun, Czechoslovakia

Sport
- Sport: Ice hockey

Vladimír Bednář (born 1 October 1948) is a Czech ice hockey player. He competed in the men's tournament at the 1972 Winter Olympics.
