= Milan Jarý =

Czech cross-country skier

Personal information
- Nationality: Czech
- Born: 30 April 1952 (age 72); Rokytnice nad Jizerou, Czechoslovakia

Sport
- Sport: Cross-country skiing

Milan Jarý (born 30 April 1952) is a Czech former cross-country skier. He competed in the men's 15 kilometre event at the 1976 Winter Olympics.
