= Jiří Kochta =

Czech ice hockey coach and player (1946–2025)

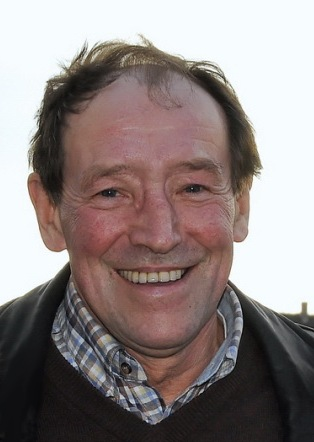
- Kochta in 2008
- Born: 11 October 1946 Prague, Czechoslovakia
- Died: 3 April 2025 (aged 78) Czech Republic
- Height: 6 ft 0 in (183 cm)
- Weight: 183 lb (83 kg; 13 st 1 lb)
- Position: Forward
- National team: Czechoslovakia
- Playing career: 1965–1986
Medal record
Representing Czechoslovakia
Men's Ice hockey
Silver medal – second place	1968 Grenoble	Ice hockey
Bronze medal – third place	1972 Sapporo	Ice hockey

Jiří Kochta (11 October 1946 – 3 April 2025) was a Czech professional ice hockey player who played in the Czechoslovak Extraliga. He played for HC Jihlava and HC Sparta Praha. He won a silver medal at the 1968 Winter Olympics and a bronze medal at the 1972 Winter Olympics.

Kochta died on 3 April 2025, at the age of 78.
