= Eduard Novák =

Czechoslovak ice hockey player

- Born: 27 November 1946 Buštěhrad, Czechoslovakia
- Died: 20 September 2010 (aged 63) Kladno, Czech Republic
- Height: 5 ft 11 in (180 cm)
- Weight: 190 lb (86 kg; 13 st 8 lb)
- Position: Right wing
- Shot: Left
- Played for: HC Kosice; HC Kladno; HC Zlin; Klagenfurter AC
- National team: Czech Republic
- NHL draft: Undrafted
- Playing career: 1965–1983
Medal record
Men's ice hockey
Representing Czechoslovakia
Olympic Games
Silver medal – second place	1976 Innsbruck	Team
Bronze medal – third place	1972 Sapporo	Team

Eduard Novák (27 November 1946 – 20 October 2010) was a Czechoslovak ice hockey player, a bronze medalist from the 1972 Winter Olympics, and a silver medalist from the 1976 Winter Olympics. He was born in Buštěhrad, Czechoslovakia.
