= Jiří Holík =

Czech ice hockey player and coach (born 1944)

- Born: 9 July 1944 (age 82) Německý Brod, Bohemia and Moravia
- Height: 5 ft 10 in (178 cm)
- Weight: 191 lb (87 kg; 13 st 9 lb)
- Position: Left wing
- Shot: Left
- Played for: HC Dukla Jihlava
- National team: Czechoslovakia
- Playing career: 1963–1981; 1984–1985
Medal record
Men's ice hockey
Representing Czechoslovakia
Olympic Games
Silver medal – second place	1968 Grenoble	Team
Silver medal – second place	1976 Innsbruck	Team
Bronze medal – third place	1964 Innsbruck	Team
Bronze medal – third place	1972 Sapporo	Team

Jiří Holík (born 9 July 1944) is a Czech former professional ice hockey player and coach. Holík played for Dukla Jihlava in the Czechoslovak Extraliga and was a member of the Czechoslovakia men's national ice hockey team. Holík was a member of the Czechoslovak 1976 Canada Cup team. He was also a member of the country's medal winning teams at the 1964, 1968, 1972, and 1976 Winter Olympics. He was inducted into the IIHF Hall of Fame in 1999.

== Playing career ==
Holík joined the local Jiskra Havlíčkův Brod club in 1952. Holík played various levels with the club, finishing with the Czechoslovak Second Division team in 1963. In 1963, Holík moved up to the HC Dukla Jihlava team of the Czechoslovak Elite League. He would be a member of Dukla Jihlava for the next fifteen seasons. His best goal-scoring season was 1968–69, when he scored 28 goals in the season. In 1969–70, Holík had his best point total of 40 points, on 23 goals and 17 assists. Holík joined Rosenheim in Germany in 1978, playing two seasons before moving to Stadlau Wien in Vienna, Austria for 1980–81. Holík retired from playing after that season, but returned to active play for one more season with Wiener EV in the Austrian Second Division in 1984–85.

Starting in 1964, Holík played internationally for the Czechoslovak national men's team. Holík played in a total of four Olympics and twelve World Championships for Czechoslovakia. He also played in the 1976 Canada Cup for Czechoslovakia. He was inducted into the IIHF Hall of Fame in 1999.

== Personal life ==
Holík's brother Jaroslav was also a hockey player.
