= Ladislav Žižka =

Czech biathlete (born 1945)

Personal information
- Nationality: Czech
- Born: 8 March 1945 (age 80); Dvůr Králové nad Labem, Protectorate of Bohemia and Moravia

Sport
- Sport: Biathlon

Ladislav Žižka (born 8 March 1945) is a Czech biathlete. He competed at the 1968 Winter Olympics, the 1972 Winter Olympics and the 1976 Winter Olympics.
