= Jaroslav Holík =

Czech ice hockey player (1942–2015)

- Born: 3 August 1942 Německý Brod, Bohemia and Moravia
- Died: 17 April 2015 (aged 72)
- Height: 6 ft 0 in (183 cm)
- Weight: 183 lb (83 kg; 13 st 1 lb)
- Position: Centre
- Shot: Left
- Played for: Dukla Jihlava
- National team: Czechoslovakia
- Playing career: 1956–1979
Medal record
Men's ice hockey
Olympic Games
Bronze medal – third place	1972 Sapporo	Team
World Championships
Gold medal – first place	1972 Prague	Ice hockey
Silver medal – second place	1965 Tampere	Ice hockey
Silver medal – second place	1966 Ljubljana	Ice hockey
Bronze medal – third place	1969 Stockholm	Ice hockey
Bronze medal – third place	1970 Stockholm	Ice hockey
Bronze medal – third place	1973 Moscow	Ice hockey

Jaroslav Holík (Czech pronunciation: [ˈjaroslav ˈɦoliːk]; 3 August 1942 – 17 April 2015) was a Czech professional ice hockey coach and former player.

== Career ==
Holík played in the Czechoslovak Extraliga for Dukla Jihlava. He won a bronze medal at the 1972 Winter Olympics in Sapporo. He was also successful at the Ice Hockey World Championships, winning gold at the 1972 World Ice Hockey Championships in Prague, silver at the 1965 World Ice Hockey Championships in Tampere and 1966 World Ice Hockey Championships in Ljubljana, and bronze at the 1969 World Ice Hockey Championships, 1970 World Ice Hockey Championships, both in Stockholm, and 1973 World Ice Hockey Championships in Moscow.

After his playing career, Holík worked as a coach. In 2000, he led the Czech under-20 national team to the victory at the 2000 World Junior Ice Hockey Championships in Sweden.

== Personal life ==
Holík's son is NHL player Bobby Holík, and Czechoslovak player Jiří Holík is his brother. Holík's grandson, David Musil, was drafted by the Edmonton Oilers. Jaroslav Holík died on 17 April 2015.
