= Ice hockey at the 1972 Winter Olympics =

Tournament details
- Host country: Japan
- Dates: 3–13 February 1972
- Teams: 11

Final positions
- Champions: Soviet Union (4th title)
- Runners-up: United States
- Third place: Czechoslovakia
- Fourth place: Sweden

Tournament statistics
- Games played: 30
- Goals scored: 235 (7.83 per game)
- Scoring leader: (Soviet Union) Valeri Kharlamov (16 points)

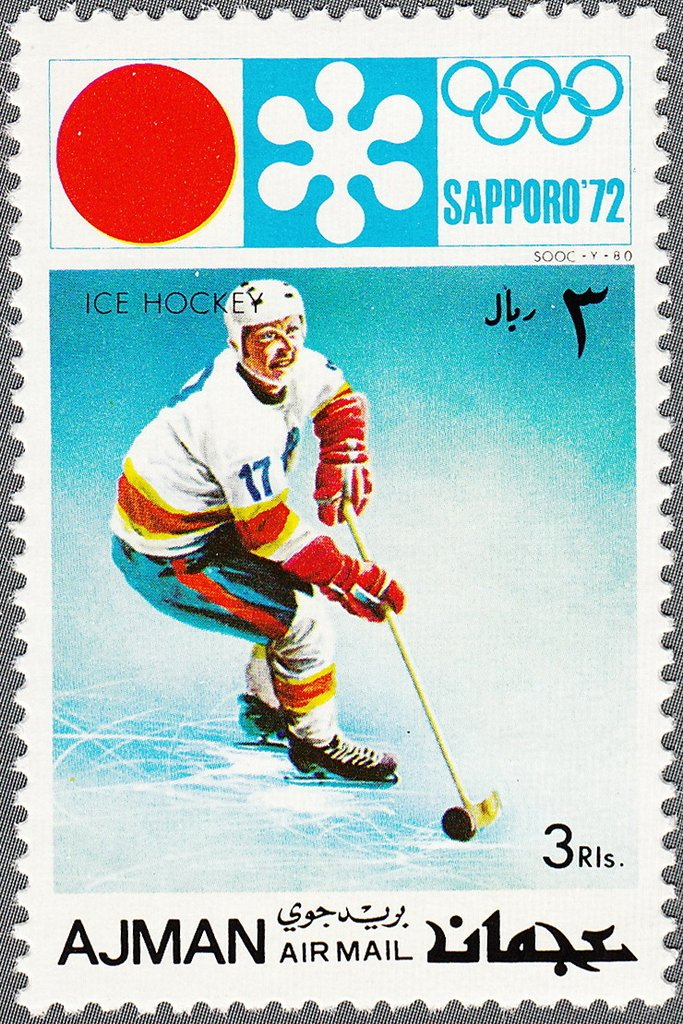
A postage stamp for the 1972 Winter Olympics

The men's ice hockey tournament at the 1972 Winter Olympics in Sapporo, Japan, was the 12th Olympic Championship. Games were held at the Makomanai Ice Arena and at the Tsukisamu Indoor Skating Rink. The Soviet Union won its fourth gold medal. The United States won the silver, while Czechoslovakia won the bronze. Canada did not send a team to the event for the first time since ice hockey was introduced to the Olympics in 1920, instead competing with and defeating the Soviets in a competition later that year known as the Summit Series. Canada would not send a men's hockey team to the 1976 Olympics either, but would compete in 1980.

== Teams ==
=== Team Canada ===
For the first time since ice hockey was introduced at the Olympic Games in 1920, Canada did not send a team to the 1972 Olympics after Canadian Minister of Health and Welfare John Munro announced the withdrawal of the team from all international competitions in response to the International Ice Hockey Federation opposition to allowing professional players at international competitions. Canadian officials were frustrated that their best players, competing in the National Hockey League, were prevented from playing while Soviet players, who were "employees" of the industrial or military organizations that fielded "amateur" teams, were allowed to compete. At that point, the Canadian men's ice hockey team was the most successful team in the world, having won six of the eleven tournaments previously contested, with medals in ten of the eleven tournaments (and a controversial post-tournament rule change denying them a perfect eleven medals). Canada would not compete internationally in hockey until 1977, when the IIHF adopted eligibility rules that allowed for professional players to compete. Instead of competing internationally at the Olympics, Canadian officials helped organize a series of games against the Soviet Union in 1972 known as the Summit Series.

=== Team USA ===
While the 1980 team had the celebrated "Miracle on Ice" and the 1960 US team had the "Forgotten Miracle", the 1972 team could be called the "completely overlooked miracle." The U.S. team was expected to finish 5th behind the Soviet Union, Czechoslovakia, Sweden, and Finland. The Soviet and Czech teams were especially powerful as there was no distinction between amateurs and pros in communist countries; these teams were made up of seasoned professionals and were ranked 1 & 2 in the world. Valeri Kharlamov of the Soviet Union was considered one of the world's best players and experts agree he would have been a star in the NHL. The same can be said for Soviet goaltender Vladislav Tretiak. In fact, this was basically the same Soviet Team that played a Canadian team composed of NHL All Stars in the 1972 Summit Series that Canada narrowly won, 4–3–1.

After qualifying for Group A by beating Switzerland 5–3, the U.S. lost as expected to Sweden, 5–1. Then they pulled off the upset of the tournament when they beat Czechoslovakia, 5–1. This surprising result was nearly as astonishing as the wins over the Soviets in 1960 and 1980. After losing as expected to the Soviet Union, the young Americans upset Finland. In the final games of the competition, the U.S. beat Poland while Finland beat Sweden and the Soviets beat the Czechs (in the game that decided the gold medal); those results boosted the U.S. from 4th to 2nd for an unexpected silver medal.

== Medalists ==
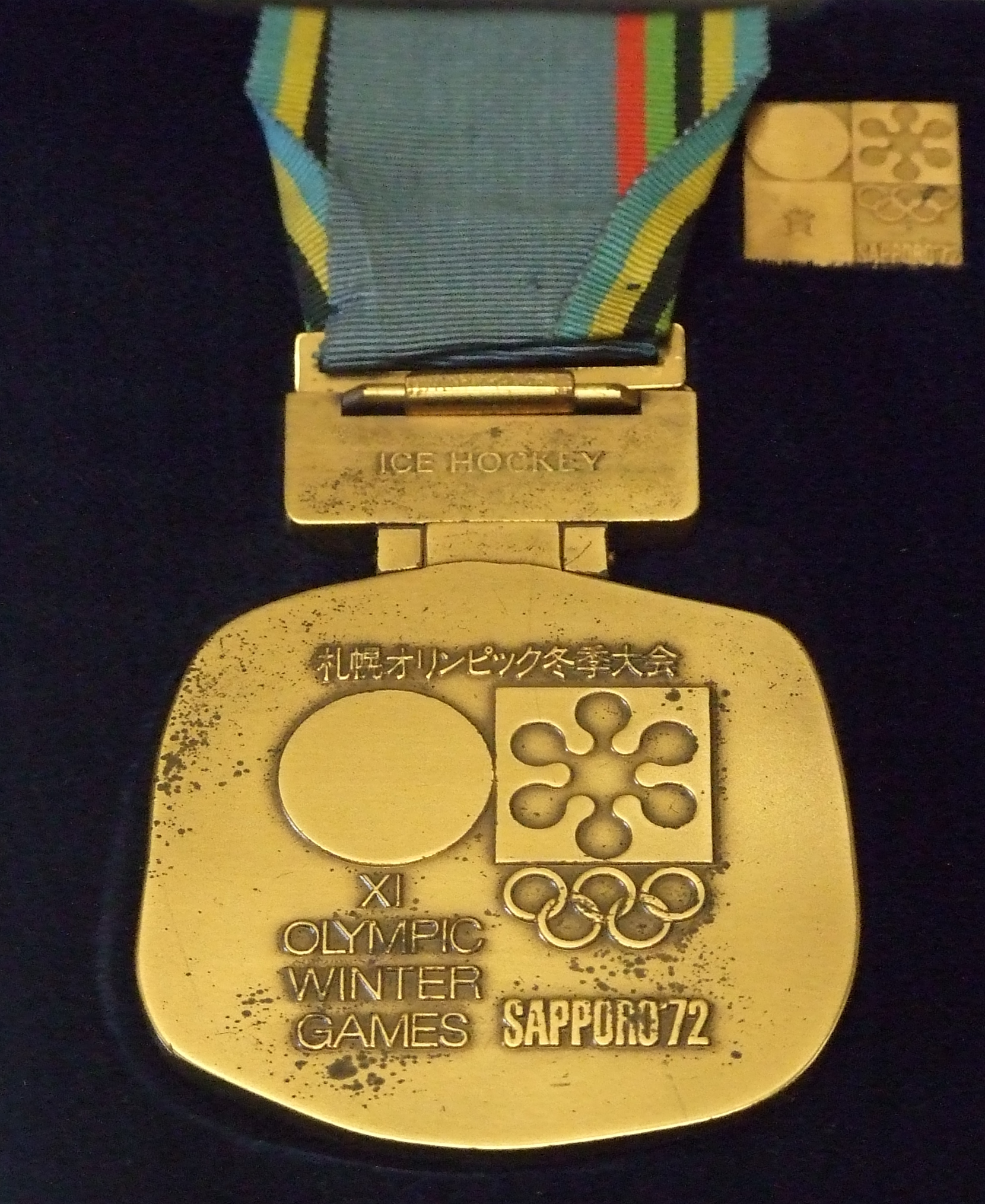
1972 Olympic gold medal

| Gold | Silver | Bronze |
|---|---|---|
| Soviet Union Vladislav Tretiak; Alexander Pashkov; Vitaly Davydov; Viktor Kuskin; Alexander Ragulin; Gennadiy Tsygankov; Vladimir Lutchenko; Valeri Vasiliev; Igor Romishevsky; Yevgeni Mishakov; Alexander Maltsev; Alexander Yakushev; Vladimir Vikulov; Anatoly Firsov; Valeri Kharlamov; Yury Blinov; Boris Mikhailov; Vladimir Petrov; Vladimir Shadrin; Yevgeni Zimin | United States Mike Curran; Pete Sears; Wally Olds; Tom Mellor; Frank Sanders; Jim McElmury; Charles Brown; Dick McGlynn; Ronald Naslund; Robbie Ftorek; Stu Irving; Kevin Ahearn; Henry Boucha; Craig Sarner; Timothy Sheehy; Keith Christiansen; Mark Howe; Tim Regan; Bruce McIntosh | Czechoslovakia Vladimír Dzurilla; Jiří Holeček; Vladimír Bednář; Rudolf Tajcnár; Oldřich Machač; František Pospíšil; Josef Horešovský; Karel Vohralík; Václav Nedomanský; Jiří Holík; Jaroslav Holík; Jiří Kochta; Eduard Novák; Richard Farda; Josef Černý; Vladimír Martinec; Ivan Hlinka; Bohuslav Šťastný |

== First round ==
Fourteen nations qualified, but East Germany, Romania and France all chose not to travel for primarily financial reasons. The remaining eleven nations were seeded according to their placement in the 1971 World Championships with first place (USSR) and the five winners to play in Group A to for 1st–6th places. The five losers played in Group B for 7th–11th places. 1971 ranking appears in parentheses.

- 3 February
  - Japan (12th) 2–8 Czechoslovakia (2nd)
  - Sweden (3rd) 8–1 Yugoslavia (11th)
- 4 February
  - USA (6th) 5–3 Switzerland (7th)
  - Poland (8th) 4–0 West Germany (5th)
  - Finland (4th) 13–1 Norway (10th)

== Final round ==
First place team wins gold, second silver and third bronze.

| Pos | Team | Pld | W | L | D | GF | GA | GD | Pts |
|---|---|---|---|---|---|---|---|---|---|
| 1 | Soviet Union | 5 | 4 | 0 | 1 | 33 | 13 | +20 | 9 |
| 2 | United States | 5 | 3 | 2 | 0 | 18 | 15 | +3 | 6 |
| 3 | Czechoslovakia | 5 | 3 | 2 | 0 | 26 | 13 | +13 | 6 |
| 4 | Sweden | 5 | 2 | 2 | 1 | 17 | 13 | +4 | 5 |
| 5 | Finland | 5 | 2 | 3 | 0 | 14 | 24 | −10 | 4 |
| 6 | Poland | 5 | 0 | 5 | 0 | 9 | 39 | −30 | 0 |

Source: HockeyCanada.ca
- 5 February
  - Sweden 5–1 USA
  - Czechoslovakia 14–1 Poland
  - USSR 9–3 Finland
- 7 February
  - USSR 3–3 Sweden
  - USA 5–1 Czechoslovakia
  - Finland 5–1 Poland
- 8 February
  - Czechoslovakia 7–1 Finland
- 9 February
  - Sweden 5–3 Poland
  - USSR 7–2 USA
- 10 February
  - USSR 9–3 Poland
  - Czechoslovakia 2–1 Sweden
  - USA 4–1 Finland
- 12 February
  - USA 6–1 Poland
- 13 February
  - Finland 4–3 Sweden
  - USSR 5–2 Czechoslovakia

== Consolation Round ==
Teams, which lost their games in the qualification round, played in this group.

| Pos | Team | Pld | W | L | D | GF | GA | GD | Pts |
|---|---|---|---|---|---|---|---|---|---|
| 7 | West Germany | 4 | 3 | 1 | 0 | 22 | 10 | +12 | 6 |
| 8 | Norway | 4 | 3 | 1 | 0 | 16 | 14 | +2 | 6 |
| 9 | Japan | 4 | 2 | 1 | 1 | 17 | 16 | +1 | 5 |
| 10 | Switzerland | 4 | 0 | 2 | 2 | 9 | 16 | −7 | 2 |
| 11 | Yugoslavia | 4 | 0 | 3 | 1 | 9 | 17 | −8 | 1 |

Source: HockeyCanada.ca
- 6 February
  - Norway 5–2 Yugoslavia
  - West Germany 5–0 Switzerland
- 7 February
  - Japan 3–3 Switzerland
  - West Germany 6–2 Yugoslavia
- 9 February
  - Japan 3–2 Yugoslavia
  - West Germany 5–1 Norway
- 10 February
  - Japan 4–5 Norway
  - Switzerland 3–3 Yugoslavia
- 12 February
  - Japan 7–6 West Germany
  - Norway 5–3 Switzerland

== Statistics ==
=== Average age ===
Gold medalists Team USSR was the oldest team in the tournament, averaging 26 years and 4 months. Team USA was the youngest team in the tournament, averaging 23 years and 3 months. Tournament average was 25 years and 3 months.

=== Leading scorers ===
| Player | GP | G | A | Pts |
|---|---|---|---|---|
| (Soviet Union) Valeri Kharlamov | 5 | 9 | 7 | 16 |
| (Czechoslovakia) Václav Nedomanský | 6 | 8 | 3 | 11 |
| (United States) Craig Sarner | 6 | 4 | 6 | 10 |
| (United States) Kevin Ahearn | 6 | 6 | 3 | 9 |
| (Soviet Union) Vladimir Vikulov | 5 | 5 | 3 | 8 |
| (Soviet Union) Aleksandr Maltsev | 5 | 4 | 3 | 7 |
| (Czechoslovakia) Jiří Kochta | 6 | 4 | 3 | 7 |
| (Soviet Union) Anatoli Firsov | 5 | 2 | 5 | 7 |
| (Soviet Union) Yuri Blinov | 5 | 3 | 3 | 6 |
| (Czechoslovakia) Richard Farda | 6 | 1 | 5 | 6 |

== Final ranking ==
1. Soviet Union
2. United States
3. Czechoslovakia
4. Sweden
5. Finland
6. Poland
7. West Germany
8. Norway
9. Japan
10. Switzerland
11. Yugoslavia
