= West Germany at the 1976 Winter Olympics =

- Flag of Germany
- IOC code: FRG (GER used at these Games)
- NOC: National Olympic Committee for Germany

in Innsbruck
- Competitors: 71 (56 men, 15 women) in 10 sports
- Flag bearer: Wolfgang Zimmerer (bobsleigh)
- Medals Ranked 5th: Gold 2 Silver 5 Bronze 3 Total 10

Winter Olympics appearances (overview)
- 1968; 1972; 1976; 1980; 1984; 1988

Other related appearances
- Germany (1928–1936, 1952, 1992–); United Team of Germany (1956–1964)

West Germany (Federal Republic of Germany) competed at the 1976 Winter Olympics in Innsbruck, Austria.

== Medalists ==
Medal	Name	Sport	Event
Gold	Rosi Mittermaier	Alpine skiing	Women's downhill
Gold	Rosi Mittermaier	Alpine skiing	Women's slalom
Silver	Rosi Mittermaier	Alpine skiing	Women's giant slalom
Silver	Wolfgang Zimmerer; Manfred Schumann	Bobsleigh	Two-man
Silver	Josef Fendt	Luge	Men's individual
Silver	Hans Brandner; Balthasar Schwarm	Luge	Men's doubles
Silver	Urban Hettich	Nordic combined	Men's individual
Bronze	Wolfgang Zimmerer; Peter Utzschneider; Bodo Bittner; Manfred Schumann	Bobsleigh	Four-man
Bronze	West Germany men's national ice hockey team: Erich Weißhaupt; Anton Kehle; Rudolf Thanner; Josef Volk; Udo Kiessling; Stefan Metz; Klaus Auhuber; Ignaz Berndaner; Rainer Phillip; Lorenz Funk; Wolfgang Boos; Ernst Köpf; Ferenc Vozar; Walter Koberle; Erich Kühnhackl; Alois Schloder; Martin Hinterstocker; Franz Reindl	Ice hockey	Men's competition
Bronze	Elisabeth Demleitner	Luge	Women's individual

== Alpine skiing ==
Men

Athlete	Event	Race 1		Race 2		Total	
Athlete	Event	Time	Rank	Time	Rank	Time	Rank
Wolfgang Junginger	Downhill					1:50.48	29
Michael Veith	Downhill					1:49.02	22
Sepp Ferstl	Downhill					1:48.41	17
Peter Fischer	Downhill					1:48.18	15
Christian Neureuther	Giant Slalom	1:52.29	37	1:51.73	29	3:44.02	30
Sepp Ferstl	Giant Slalom	1:49.98	30	1:51.54	28	3:41.52	28
Wolfgang Junginger	Giant Slalom	1:49.79	29	1:46.23	14	3:36.02	19
Albert Burger	Giant Slalom	1:47.32	12	1:45.36	11	3:32.68	10
Sepp Ferstl	Slalom	1:06.32	29	1:08.02	20	2:14.34	20
Albert Burger	Slalom	1:03.38	17	1:06.93	16	2:10.31	15
Christian Neureuther	Slalom	1:01.70	8	1:04.86	5	2:06.56	5
Wolfgang Junginger	Slalom	1:00.95	3	1:06.13	11	2:07.08	6

Women

Athlete	Event	Race 1		Race 2		Total	
Athlete	Event	Time	Rank	Time	Rank	Time	Rank
Maria Epple	Downhill					1:51.41	23
Evi Mittermaier	Downhill					1:49.23	13
Irene Epple	Downhill					1:48.91	10
Rosi Mittermaier	Downhill					1:46.16	1st place, gold medalist(s)
Maria Epple	Giant Slalom					1:33.02	24
Irene Epple	Giant Slalom					1:31.46	15
Evi Mittermaier	Giant Slalom					1:30.64	8
Rosi Mittermaier	Giant Slalom					1:29.25	2nd place, silver medalist(s)
Monika Berwein	Slalom	49.17	14	DNF	–	DNF	–
Christa Zechmeister	Slalom	48.20	8	45.52	6	1:33.72	7
Rosi Mittermaier	Slalom	46.77	2	43.77	1	1:30.54	1st place, gold medalist(s)
Pamela Behr	Slalom	46.88	1	45.63	7	1:32.31	5

== Biathlon ==
Men

Event	Athlete	Time	Penalties	Adjusted time ^{1}	Rank
20 km	Alois Kanamüller	1'17:25.26	8	1'25:25.26	34
20 km	Josef Niedermeier	1'18:33.63	5	1'23:33.63	26
20 km	Heinrich Mehringer	1'16:49.15	2	1'18:49.15	11

^{1}One minute added per close miss (a hit in the outer ring), two minutes added per complete miss.

Men's 4 x 7.5 km relay

Athletes	Race		
Athletes	Misses ^{2}	Time	Rank
Heinrich Mehringer; Gerd Winkler; Josef Keck; Claus Gehrke	4	2'04:11.86	4

^{2}A penalty loop of 200 metres had to be skied per missed target.

== Bobsleigh ==
Sled	Athletes	Event	Run 1		Run 2		Run 3		Run 4		Total	
Sled	Athletes	Event	Time	Rank	Time	Rank	Time	Rank	Time	Rank	Time	Rank
FRG-1	Wolfgang Zimmerer; Manfred Schumann	Two-man	56.09	2	56.31	3	56.26	2	56.33	2	3:44.99	2nd place, silver medalist(s)
FRG-2	Georg Heibl; Fritz Ohlwärter	Two-man	56.36	4	56.43	4	56.59	5	56.75	6	3:46.13	5

Sled	Athletes	Event	Run 1		Run 2		Run 3		Run 4		Total	
Sled	Athletes	Event	Time	Rank	Time	Rank	Time	Rank	Time	Rank	Time	Rank
FRG-1	Wolfgang Zimmerer; Peter Utzschneider; Bodo Bittner; Manfred Schumann	Four-man	54.82	3	54.87	3	55.53	3	56.15	3	3:41.37	3rd place, bronze medalist(s)
FRG-2	Georg Heibl; Hans Morant; Siegfried Radandt; Fritz Ohlwärter	Four-man	54.92	4	54.98	4	55.70	5	56.87	8	3:42.47	5

== Cross-country skiing ==
Men

Event	Athlete	Race	
Event	Athlete	Time	Rank
15 km	Hans Speicher	48:28.90	45
15 km	Franz Betz	47:39.15	38
15 km	Georg Kandlinger	47:20.13	31
15 km	Georg Zipfel	45:38.10	7
30 km	Walter Demel	1'37:44.17	40
30 km	Hans Speicher	1'36:52.45	36
30 km	Franz Betz	1'34:55.54	18
30 km	Georg Zipfel	1'34:04.71	14
50 km	Georg Kandlinger	DNF	–
50 km	Franz Betz	DNF	–
50 km	Walter Demel	2'46:55.95	25
50 km	Georg Zipfel	2'46:20.30	23

Men's 4 × 10 km relay

Athletes	Race	
Athletes	Time	Rank
Franz Betz; Georg Kandlinger; Walter Demel; Georg Zipfel	2'12:38.96	9

Women

Event	Athlete	Race	
Event	Athlete	Time	Rank
5 km	Iris Schulze	18:04.81	33
5 km	Michaela Endler	17:08.68	21
10 km	Iris Schulze	33:43.82	31
10 km	Michaela Endler	32:55.62	25

== Figure skating ==
Women

Athlete	CF	SP	FS	Points	Places	Rank
Dagmar Lurz	7	10	11	178.04	92	10
Isabel De Navarre	1	11	12	182.42	59	5

Pairs

Athletes	SP	FS	Points	Places	Rank
Corinna Halke; Eberhard Rausch	8	8	127.37	72	8

== Ice hockey ==
=== First round ===
Winners (in bold) entered the Medal Round. Other teams played a consolation round for 7th-12th places.

Team 1	Score	Team 2
**West Germany**	5–1	Switzerland

=== Medal round ===
Rank		Pld	W	L	T	GF	GA	Pts
1	Soviet Union	5	5	0	0	40	11	10
2	Czechoslovakia	5	3	2	0	17	10	6
3	West Germany (bronze)	5	2	3	0	21	24	4
4	Finland	5	2	3	0	19	18	4
5	United States	5	2	3	0	15	21	4
6	Poland	5	1	4	0	9	37	2

- West Germany 7-4 Poland
- Finland 5-3 West Germany
- USSR 7-3 West Germany
- Czechoslovakia 7-4 West Germany
- West Germany 4-1 USA

=== Leading scorers ===
Rk		GP	G	A	Pts
2nd	Erich Kuhnhackl	5	5	5	10
6th	Ernst Kopf	5	3	5	8
10th	Lorenz Funk	5	2	5	7

- **Team roster**

- Erich Weißhaupt
- Anton Kehle
- Rudolf Thanner
- Josef Volk
- Udo Kiessling
- Stefan Metz
- Klaus Auhuber
- Ignaz Berndaner
- Rainer Phillip
- Lorenz Funk
- Wolfgang Boos
- Ernst Köpf, Sr.
- Ferenc Vozar
- Walter Koberle
- Erich Kühnhackl
- Alois Schloder
- Martin Hinterstocker
- Franz Reindl

- Head coach: Xaver Unsinn

== Luge ==
Men

Athlete	Run 1		Run 2		Run 3		Run 4		Total	
Athlete	Time	Rank	Time	Rank	Time	Rank	Time	Rank	Time	Rank
Stefan Hölzlwimmer	52.766	4	n/a	?	n/a	?	n/a	?	DNF	–
Anton Winkler	52.755	3	52.194	5	52.219	7	52.352	6	3:29.520	6
Josef Fendt	52.694	2	51.933	1	51.749	3	51.820	2	3:28.196	2nd place, silver medalist(s)

(Men's) Doubles

Athletes	Run 1		Run 2		Total	
Athletes	Time	Rank	Time	Rank	Time	Rank
Hans Brandner; Balthasar Schwarm	42.792	2	43.097	4	1:25.889	2nd place, silver medalist(s)
Stefan Hölzlwimmer; Rudi Größwang	43.205	5	43.033	3	1:26.238	4

Women

Athlete	Run 1		Run 2		Run 3		Run 4		Total	
Athlete	Time	Rank	Time	Rank	Time	Rank	Time	Rank	Time	Rank
Elisabeth Demleitner	43.138	7	42.535	1	42.388	2	42.995	7	2:51.056	3rd place, bronze medalist(s)
Monika Scheftschik	42.863	2	42.732	4	42.981	9	42.964	5	2:51.540	7

== Nordic combined ==
Events:

- normal hill ski jumping (Three jumps, best two counted and shown here.)
- 15 km cross-country skiing

Athlete	Event	Ski Jumping				Cross-country			Total	
Athlete	Event	Distance 1	Distance 2	Points	Rank	Time	Points	Rank	Points	Rank
Günther Abel	Individual	74.0	74.0	196.8	14	50:29.77	197.77	14	394.57	14
Urban Hettich	Individual	74.5	75.0	198.9	11	48:01.55	220.00	1	418.90	2nd place, silver medalist(s)

== Ski jumping ==
Athlete	Event	Jump 1		Jump 2		Total	
Athlete	Event	Distance	Points	Distance	Points	Points	Rank
Sepp Schwinghammer	Normal hill	75.5	106.1	76.5	109.2	215.3	23
Alfred Grosche	Normal hill	80.0	115.3	80.5	116.6	231.9	10
Alfred Grosche	Large hill	89.5	100.3	84.5	92.8	193.1	16

== Speed skating ==
Men

Event	Athlete	Race	
Event	Athlete	Time	Rank
500 m	Horst Freese	DNF	–
1000 m	Horst Freese	1:21.48	9
1500 m	Herbert Schwarz	2:03.76	12
5000 m	Herbert Schwarz	7:52.26	15

Women

Event	Athlete	Race	
Event	Athlete	Time	Rank
500 m	Monika Gawenus-Holzner-Pflug	44.36	12
1000 m	Monika Gawenus-Holzner-Pflug	1:29.54	5
