= List of Olympic men's ice hockey players for West Germany =

The list of Olympic men's ice hockey players for West Germany consisted of 68 skaters and 10 goaltenders. Men's ice hockey tournaments have been staged at the Olympic Games since 1920 (it was introduced at the 1920 Summer Olympics, and was permanently added to the Winter Olympic Games in 1924). West Germany participated in six tournaments, the first in 1968 and the last in 1988. Before 1968 and after 1988 West Germany had participated as part of a unified German team. West Germany's best finish was third overall, winning a bronze medal at the 1976 Winter Olympics, while their lowest finish was tenth place in 1980.

Erich Kühnhackl has scored the most goals, with 16, assists, 16, and has the most points, 32. Udo Kiessling has competed in the most Olympics, appearing in four tournaments with West Germany (and one with Germany), and has played the most games of any skater, with 25.

Four players, Dieter Hegen, Udo Kiessling, Erich Kühnhackl, and Alois Schloder have been inducted into the International Ice Hockey Federation Hall of Fame, though all have been inducted under Germany.

== Key ==
General terms
Term	Definition
GP	Games played
IIHFHOF	International Ice Hockey Federation Hall of Fame
Olympics	Number of Olympic Games tournaments
Ref(s)	Reference(s)

Goaltender statistical abbreviations
Abbreviation	Definition
W	Wins
L	Losses
T	Ties
Min	Minutes played
SO	Shutouts
GA	Goals against
GAA	Goals against average

Skater statistical abbreviations
Abbreviation	Definition
G	Goals
A	Assists
P	Points
PIM	Penalty minutes

== Goaltenders ==
Goaltenders
Player	Olympics	Tournament(s)	GP	W	L	T	Min	SO	GA	GAA	Notes	Ref(s)
Helmut de Raaf	1	1988	–	–	–	–	–	–	–	–	1992, 1994	
Bernhard Englbrecht	2	1980, 1984	–	–	–	–	–	–	–	–		
Karl Friesen	2	1984, 1988	–	–	–	–	–	–	–	–	1992	
Anton Kehle	2	1972, 1976	–	–	–	–	–	–	–	–	Bronze (1976)	
Günther Knauss	1	1968	–	–	–	–	–	–	–	–		
Rainer Makatsch	1	1972	–	–	–	–	–	–	–	–		
Josef Schlickenrieder	1	1988	–	–	–	–	–	–	–	–		
Josef Schramm	1	1968	–	–	–	–	–	–	–	–		
Sigmund Suttner	1	1980	–	–	–	–	–	–	–	–		
Erich Weishaupt	1	1976	–	–	–	–	–	–	–	–	Bronze (1976)	

== Skaters ==
Skaters
Player	Olympics	Tournament(s)	GP	G	A	P	PIM	Notes	Ref(s)
Manfred Ahne	1	1984	6	0	0	0	0		
Heiko Antons	1	1972	1	0	0	0	0		
Klaus Auhuber	2	1976, 1980	11	1	1	2	25	Bronze (1976)	
Heinz Bader	1	1968	7	0	1	1	4		
Reinhold Bauer	1	1972	3	0	0	2	0		
Ignaz Berndaner	2	1976, 1984	12	3	2	5	0	Bronze (1976)	
Michael Betz	1	1984	6	1	0	1	2		
Wolfgang Boos	1	1976	6	1	0	1	0	Bronze (1976)	
Christian Brittig	1	1988	8	1	0	1	0		
Peter Draisaitl	1	1988	8	0	1	1	4	1992, 1998	
Uli Egen	1	1980	5	2	2	4	6		
Karl-Heinz Egger	1	1972	5	1	0	1	4		
Johann Eimansberger	1	1972	5	2	1	3	4		
Ron Fischer	1	1988	8	1	1	2	6	1992	
Georg Franz	1	1988	8	2	2	4	8	1994	
Lorenz Funk	3	1968, 1972, 1976	18	9	6	15	6	Bronze (1976)	
Manfred Gmeiner	1	1968	7	0	0	0	2		
Gustav Hanig	1	1968	7	2	1	3	0		
Dieter Hegen	2	1984, 1988	14	9	3	12	6	1992, 1994, 1998	
Uli Hiemer	1	1984	6	2	0	2	4	1992, 1994	
Hermann Hinterstocker	1	1980	5	0	1	1	0		
Martin Hinterstocker	2	1976, 1980	11	5	6	11	9	Bronze (1976)	
Anton Hofherr	1	1972	4	2	3	5	10		
Ernst Höfner	2	1980, 1984	11	4	3	7	6		
Georg Holzmann	1	1988	8	1	2	3	6	1992	
Udo Kiessling	4	1976, 1980, 1984, 1988	25	5	9	14	38	Bronze (1976) 1992	
Georg Kink	1	1972	4	0	1	1	6		
Walter Köberle	1	1976	6	1	0	1	10	Bronze (1976)	
Ernst Köpf	2	1968, 1976	14	9	7	16	2	Bronze (1976) 1964	
Harold Kreis	2	1984, 1988	14	1	3	4	2		
Horst-Peter Kretschmer	2	1980, 1988	13	3	2	5	26		
Harald Krüll	1	1980	5	0	3	3	0		
Marcus Kuhl	2	1980, 1984	11	3	4	7	4		
Bernd Kuhn	2	1968, 1972	12	1	1	2	8		
Erich Kühnhackl	3	1972, 1976, 1984	17	16	16	32	22	Bronze (1976)	
Paul Langner	1	1972	4	0	1	1	2		
Peter Lax	1	1968	8	3	1	4	8		
Dieter Medicus	1	1988	8	0	0	0	0		
Horst Meindl	1	1968	8	0	4	4	2		
Holger Meitinger	1	1980	5	0	2	2	20		
Stefan Metz	1	1976	6	0	0	0	0	Bronze (1976)	
Werner Modes	1	1972	5	1	0	1	0		
Andreas Niederberger	2	1984, 1988	14	0	2	2	8	1992, 1994	
Peter Obresa	1	1988	8	2	1	3	4		
Rainer Philipp	3	1972, 1976, 1980	15	2	8	10	6	Bronze (1976)	
Sepp Reif	1	1968	7	1	0	1	6	1960, 1964	
Joachim Reil	3	1980, 1984, 1988	19	1	1	2	6		
Franz Reindl	3	1976, 1980, 1984	16	2	5	7	4	Bronze (1976)	
Roy Roedger	2	1984, 1988	14	4	3	7	18		
Hans Rothkirch	1	1972	5	2	0	2	4		
Peter Scharf	2	1980, 1984	11	0	4	4	10		
Johannes Schichtl	1	1968	7	0	0	0	16		
Peter Schiller	1	1988	8	2	1	3	6		
Alois Schloder	3	1968, 1972, 1976	17	6	3	9	20	Bronze (1976)	
Otto Schneitberger	2	1968, 1972	11	0	1	1	12	1960, 1964	
Manfred Schuster	1	1988	8	0	0	0	12		
Helmut Steiger	2	1984, 1988	14	5	9	14	14		
Rudolf Thanner	3	1968, 1972, 1976	17	6	2	8	10	Bronze (1976)	
Bernd Truntschka	1	1988	8	0	1	1	2	1992, 1994	
Gerd Truntschka	3	1980, 1984, 1988	19	9	15	24	29	1992	
Vladimír Vacátko	1	1980	4	4	1	5	4		
Josef Völk	3	1968, 1972, 1976	17	3	0	3	8	Bronze (1976)	
Ferenc Vozar	1	1976	6	0	0	0	2	Bronze (1976)	
Leonhard Waitl	1	1968	7	1	1	2	10	1960, 1964	
Heinz Weisenbach	1	1968	8	1	0	1	4		
Martin Wild	2	1972, 1980	7	0	2	2	0		
Manfred Wolf	2	1984, 1988	14	3	1	4	0		
Hans Zach	1	1980	5	1	1	2	2		
