= List of 1976 Winter Olympics medal winners =

== Alpine skiing ==
=== Men's events ===
| Event | Gold | Silver | Bronze |
|---|---|---|---|
| Downhill | Franz Klammer; Austria | Bernhard Russi; Switzerland | Herbert Plank; Italy |
| Giant slalom | Heini Hemmi; Switzerland | Ernst Good; Switzerland | Ingemar Stenmark; Sweden |
| Slalom | Piero Gros; Italy | Gustav Thöni; Italy | Willi Frommelt; Liechtenstein |

=== Women's events ===
| Event | Gold | Silver | Bronze |
|---|---|---|---|
| Downhill | Rosi Mittermaier; West Germany | Brigitte Totschnig; Austria | Cindy Nelson; United States |
| Giant slalom | Kathy Kreiner; Canada | Rosi Mittermaier; West Germany | Danièle Debernard; France |
| Slalom | Rosi Mittermaier; West Germany | Claudia Giordani; Italy | Hanni Wenzel; Liechtenstein |

== Biathlon ==
| Event | Gold | Silver | Bronze |
|---|---|---|---|
| Men's Individual | Nikolay Kruglov; Soviet Union | Heikki Ikola; Finland | Aleksandr Elizarov; Soviet Union |
| Men's Relay | Soviet Union; Aleksandr Elizarov; Ivan Biakov; Nikolay Kruglov; Aleksandr Tikhonov | Finland; Henrik Flöjt; Esko Saira; Juhani Suutarinen; Heikki Ikola | East Germany; Karl-Heinz Menz; Frank Ullrich; Manfred Beer; Manfred Geyer |

== Bobsleigh ==
| Event | Gold | Silver | Bronze |
|---|---|---|---|
| Two-man | East Germany (GDR-2); Meinhard Nehmer; Bernhard Germeshausen | West Germany (FRG-1); Wolfgang Zimmerer; Manfred Schumann | Switzerland (SUI-1); Erich Schärer; Sepp Benz |
| Four-man | East Germany (GDR-1); Meinhard Nehmer; Jochen Babock; Bernhard Germeshausen; Bernhard Lehmann | Switzerland (SUI-2); Erich Schärer; Ueli Bächli; Ruedi Marti; Sepp Benz | West Germany (FRG-1); Wolfgang Zimmerer; Peter Utzschneider; Bodo Bittner; Manfred Schumann |

== Cross-country skiing ==
=== Men's events ===
| Event | Gold | Silver | Bronze |
|---|---|---|---|
| 15 km | Nikolay Bazhukov; Soviet Union | Yevgeny Belyayev; Soviet Union | Arto Koivisto; Finland |
| 30 km | Sergey Savelyev; Soviet Union | Bill Koch; United States | Ivan Garanin; Soviet Union |
| 50 km | Ivar Formo; Norway | Gert-Dietmar Klause; East Germany | Benny Södergren; Sweden |
| 4×10 km | Finland; Matti Pitkänen; Juha Mieto; Pertti Teurajärvi; Arto Koivisto | Norway; Pål Tyldum; Einar Sagstuen; Ivar Formo; Odd Martinsen | Soviet Union; Yevgeny Belyayev; Nikolay Bazhukov; Sergey Savelyev; Ivan Garanin |

=== Women's events ===
| Event | Gold | Silver | Bronze |
|---|---|---|---|
| 5 km | Helena Takalo; Finland | Raisa Smetanina; Soviet Union | Nina Baldycheva; Soviet Union |
| 10 km | Raisa Smetanina; Soviet Union | Helena Takalo; Finland | Galina Kulakova; Soviet Union |
| 4×5 km | Soviet Union; Nina Baldycheva; Zinaida Amosova; Raisa Smetanina; Galina Kulakova | Finland; Liisa Suikhonen; Marjatta Kajosmaa; Hilkka Riihivuori; Helena Takalo | East Germany; Monika Debertshäuser; Sigrun Krause; Barbara Petzold; Veronika Hesse |

== Figure skating ==
| Event | Gold | Silver | Bronze |
|---|---|---|---|
| Men's singles | John Curry; Great Britain | Vladimir Kovalev; Soviet Union | Toller Cranston; Canada |
| Ladies' singles | Dorothy Hamill; United States | Dianne de Leeuw; Netherlands | Christine Errath; East Germany |
| Pairs | Soviet Union; Irina Rodnina; Alexander Zaitsev | East Germany; Romy Kermer; Rolf Österreich | East Germany; Manuela Groß; Uwe Kagelmann |
| Ice dancing | Soviet Union; Liudmila Pakhomova; Alexander Gorshkov | Soviet Union; Irina Moiseeva; Andrei Minenkov | United States; Colleen O'Connor; Jim Millns |

== Ice hockey ==
| Event | Gold | Silver | Bronze |
|---|---|---|---|
| Men's team | Soviet Union; Vladislav Tretiak; Aleksandr Sidelnikov; Aleksandr Gusev; Vladimir Lutchenko; Sergei Babinov; Yury Lyapkin; Gennadiy Tsygankov; Sergey Kapustin; Aleksandr Maltsev; Boris Aleksandrov; Boris Mikhailov; Alexander Yakushev; Vladimir Petrov; Valeri Kharlamov; Vladimir Shadrin; Valeri Vasiliev; Viktor Shalimov; Viktor Zhluktov | Czechoslovakia; Jiří Holík; Oldřich Machač; František Pospíšil; Jiří Holeček; Bohuslav Šťastný; Ivan Hlinka; Vladimír Martinec; Eduard Novák; Josef Augusta; Jiří Bubla; Milan Chalupa; Jiří Crha; Miroslav Dvořák; Bohuslav Ebermann; Milan Kajkl; Jiří Novák; Milan Nový; Jaroslav Pouzar | West Germany; Lorenz Funk; Ernst Köpf, Sr. Alois Schloder; Rudolf Thanner; Josef Völk; Anton Kehle; Erich Kühnhackl; Rainer Philipp; Klaus Auhuber; Ignaz Berndaner; Wolfgang Boos; Martin Hinterstocker; Udo Kiessling; Walter Köberle; Stefan Metz; Franz Reindl; Ferenc Vozar; Erich Weishaupt |

== Luge ==
| Event | Gold | Silver | Bronze |
|---|---|---|---|
| Men's singles | Dettlef Günther; East Germany | Josef Fendt; West Germany | Hans Rinn; East Germany |
| Women's singles | Margit Schumann; East Germany | Ute Rührold; East Germany | Elisabeth Demleitner; West Germany |
| Doubles | East Germany; Hans Rinn; Norbert Hahn | West Germany; Hans Brandner; Balthasar Schwarm | Austria; Rudolf Schmid; Franz Schachner |

== Nordic combined ==
| Event | Gold | Silver | Bronze |
|---|---|---|---|
| Individual | Ulrich Wehling; East Germany | Urban Hettich; West Germany | Konrad Winkler; East Germany |

== Ski jumping ==
| Event | Gold | Silver | Bronze |
|---|---|---|---|
| Normal hill individual | Hans-Georg Aschenbach; East Germany | Jochen Danneberg; East Germany | Karl Schnabl; Austria |
| Large hill individual | Karl Schnabl; Austria | Toni Innauer; Austria | Henry Glaß; East Germany |

== Speed skating ==
=== Men's events ===
| Event | Gold | Silver | Bronze |
|---|---|---|---|
| 500 metres | Yevgeny Kulikov; Soviet Union | Valery Muratov; Soviet Union | Dan Immerfall; United States |
| 1000 metres | Peter Mueller; United States | Jørn Didriksen; Norway | Valery Muratov; Soviet Union |
| 1500 metres | Jan Egil Storholt; Norway | Yury Kondakov; Soviet Union | Hans van Helden; Netherlands |
| 5000 metres | Sten Stensen; Norway | Piet Kleine; Netherlands | Hans van Helden; Netherlands |
| 10,000 metres | Piet Kleine; Netherlands | Sten Stensen; Norway | Hans van Helden; Netherlands |

=== Women's events ===
| Event | Gold | Silver | Bronze |
|---|---|---|---|
| 500 metres | Sheila Young; United States | Cathy Priestner; Canada | Tatyana Averina; Soviet Union |
| 1000 metres | Tatyana Averina; Soviet Union | Leah Poulos; United States | Sheila Young; United States |
| 1500 metres | Galina Stepanskaya; Soviet Union | Sheila Young; United States | Tatyana Averina; Soviet Union |
| 3000 metres | Tatyana Averina; Soviet Union | Andrea Mitscherlich; East Germany | Lisbeth Korsmo; Norway |

== See also ==
- 1976 Winter Olympics medal table
