= 1984 Canada Cup rosters =

Below are the ice hockey national team rosters of the 1984 Canada Cup.

== Canada ==
Head coach: Glen Sather

Assistant coaches: John Muckler, Ted Green, Tom Watt

No.	Pos.	Name	Height	Weight	Birthdate	1984-85 Team
31	G	Grant Fuhr	5 ft 11 in (180 cm)	183 lb (83 kg)	September 28, 1962 (aged 21)	(Canada) Edmonton Oilers
30	G	Réjean Lemelin	5 ft 11 in (180 cm)	170 lb (77 kg)	November 19, 1954 (aged 29)	(Canada) Calgary Flames
1	G	Pete Peeters	6 ft 1 in (185 cm)	194 lb (88 kg)	August 7, 1957 (aged 27)	(United States) Boston Bruins
7	D	Ray Bourque	5 ft 11 in (180 cm)	216 lb (98 kg)	December 28, 1960 (aged 23)	(United States) Boston Bruins
77	D	Paul Coffey	6 ft 0 in (183 cm)	201 lb (91 kg)	June 1, 1961 (aged 23)	(Canada) Edmonton Oilers
21	D	Randy Gregg	6 ft 0 in (183 cm)	209 lb (95 kg)	February 19, 1956 (aged 28)	(Canada) Edmonton Oilers
2	D	Charlie Huddy	6 ft 0 in (183 cm)	209 lb (95 kg)	June 2, 1959 (aged 25)	(Canada) Edmonton Oilers
4	D	Kevin Lowe	6 ft 2 in (188 cm)	201 lb (91 kg)	April 15, 1959 (aged 25)	(Canada) Edmonton Oilers
19	D	Larry Robinson (C)	6 ft 4 in (193 cm)	220 lb (100 kg)	June 2, 1951 (aged 33)	(Canada) Montreal Canadiens
24	D	Doug Wilson	6 ft 1 in (185 cm)	190 lb (86 kg)	July 5, 1957 (aged 27)	(United States) Chicago Black Hawks
9	F	Glenn Anderson	6 ft 1 in (185 cm)	190 lb (86 kg)	October 2, 1960 (aged 23)	(Canada) Edmonton Oilers
23	F	Brian Bellows	5 ft 11 in (180 cm)	209 lb (95 kg)	September 1, 1964 (aged 20)	(United States) Minnesota North Stars
22	F	Mike Bossy	6 ft 0 in (183 cm)	185 lb (84 kg)	January 22, 1957 (aged 27)	(United States) New York Islanders
14	F	Bob Bourne	6 ft 3 in (191 cm)	201 lb (91 kg)	June 21, 1954 (aged 30)	(United States) New York Islanders
17	F	Mike Gartner	6 ft 1 in (185 cm)	190 lb (86 kg)	October 29, 1959 (aged 24)	(United States) Washington Capitals
15	F	Michel Goulet	6 ft 1 in (185 cm)	185 lb (84 kg)	April 21, 1960 (aged 24)	(Canada) Quebec Nordiques
99	F	Wayne Gretzky (C)	6 ft 0 in (183 cm)	185 lb (84 kg)	January 26, 1961 (aged 23)	(Canada) Edmonton Oilers
11	F	Mark Messier (A)	6 ft 1 in (185 cm)	205 lb (93 kg)	January 18, 1961 (aged 23)	(Canada) Edmonton Oilers
16	F	Rick Middleton	5 ft 11 in (180 cm)	170 lb (77 kg)	December 4, 1953 (aged 30)	(United States) Boston Bruins
26	F	Peter Šťastný	6 ft 1 in (185 cm)	201 lb (91 kg)	September 18, 1956 (aged 28)	(Canada) Quebec Nordiques
10	F	Brent Sutter	6 ft 0 in (183 cm)	187 lb (85 kg)	June 10, 1962 (aged 22)	(United States) New York Islanders
27	F	John Tonelli	6 ft 1 in (185 cm)	201 lb (91 kg)	March 23, 1957 (aged 27)	(United States) New York Islanders
8	F	Steve Yzerman	5 ft 11 in (180 cm)	185 lb (84 kg)	May 9, 1965 (aged 19)	(United States) Detroit Red Wings

== Czechoslovakia ==
Head coach: Luděk Bukač

No.	Pos.	Name	Height	Weight	Birthdate	1984-85 Team
2	G	Dominik Hašek	6 ft 0 in (183 cm)	165 lb (75 kg)	January 29, 1965 (aged 19)	(Czechoslovakia) TJ Pardubice
25	G	Jaromír Šindel	6 ft 1 in (185 cm)	190 lb (86 kg)	November 30, 1959 (aged 24)	(Czechoslovakia) ASD Dukla Jihlava
9	D	Jaroslav Benák	6 ft 0 in (183 cm)	187 lb (85 kg)	April 3, 1962 (aged 22)	(Czechoslovakia) ASD Dukla Jihlava
4	D	Miloslav Hořava	5 ft 11 in (180 cm)	192 lb (87 kg)	August 14, 1961 (aged 23)	(Czechoslovakia) ASD Dukla Jihlava
8	D	Arnold Kadlec	6 ft 2 in (188 cm)	212 lb (96 kg)	January 8, 1959 (aged 25)	(Czechoslovakia) TJ Litvínov
6	D	Franktišek Musil	6 ft 3 in (191 cm)	214 lb (97 kg)	December 17, 1964 (aged 19)	(Czechoslovakia) ASD Dukla Jihlava
15	D	Antonín Stavjaňa	6 ft 0 in (183 cm)	198 lb (90 kg)	February 10, 1963 (aged 21)	(Czechoslovakia) TJ Gottwaldov
7	D	Eduard Uvira	6 ft 0 in (183 cm)	209 lb (95 kg)	June 12, 1961 (aged 23)	(Czechoslovakia) TJ Litvínov
19	F	Vladimír Caldr (C)	-	-	November 26, 1958 (aged 25)	(Czechoslovakia) TJ Motor Česke Budějovice
14	F	Jiři Dudáček	5 ft 9 in (175 cm)	170 lb (77 kg)	April 4, 1962 (aged 22)	(Czechoslovakia) ASD Dukla Jihlava
24	F	Jiří Hrdina	6 ft 0 in (183 cm)	194 lb (88 kg)	January 5, 1958 (aged 26)	(Czechoslovakia) TJ Sparta Praha
23	F	Vladimír Kameš	5 ft 11 in (180 cm)	187 lb (85 kg)	September 28, 1964 (aged 19)	(Czechoslovakia) ASD Dukla Jihlava
12	F	Petr Klíma	6 ft 0 in (183 cm)	190 lb (86 kg)	December 23, 1964 (aged 19)	(Czechoslovakia) ASD Dukla Jihlava
26	F	Jaroslav Korbela	6 ft 2 in (188 cm)	203 lb (92 kg)	May 25, 1957 (aged 27)	(Czechoslovakia) TJ Motor Česke Budějovice
20	F	Jiří Lála	5 ft 10 in (178 cm)	181 lb (82 kg)	August 21, 1959 (aged 25)	(Czechoslovakia) TJ Motor Česke Budějovice
11	F	Igor Liba	6 ft 0 in (183 cm)	198 lb (90 kg)	November 4, 1960 (aged 23)	(Czechoslovakia) HC Košice
29	F	Vincent Lukáč	5 ft 9 in (175 cm)	170 lb (77 kg)	February 14, 1954 (aged 30)	(Czechoslovakia) HC Košice
21	F	Dušan Pašek	6 ft 1 in (185 cm)	201 lb (91 kg)	July 9, 1960 (aged 24)	(Czechoslovakia) HC Slovan Bratislava
17	F	Vladimír Růžička	6 ft 3 in (191 cm)	216 lb (98 kg)	June 6, 1963 (aged 21)	(Czechoslovakia) ASD Dukla Jihlava
22	F	Ladislav Svozil	-	-	May 8, 1958 (aged 26)	(Czechoslovakia) TJ Vitkovice

== Sweden ==
Head coach: Leif Boork

Assistant coach: Curt Larsson, Curt Lindström

No.	Pos.	Name	Height	Weight	Birthdate	1984-85 Team
25	G	Peter Lindmark	5 ft 11 in (180 cm)	179 lb (81 kg)	November 8, 1956 (aged 27)	(Sweden) Färjestad BK
1	G	Rolf Ridderwall	5 ft 11 in (180 cm)	172 lb (78 kg)	November 20, 1958 (aged 25)	(Sweden) Djurgårdens IF
30	G	Göte Wälitalo	6 ft 0 in (183 cm)	176 lb (80 kg)	July 18, 1956 (aged 28)	(Sweden) IF Björklöven
19	D	Peter Andersson	6 ft 0 in (183 cm)	181 lb (82 kg)	March 2, 1962 (aged 22)	(United States) Washington Capitals
3	D	Anders Eldebrink	6 ft 0 in (183 cm)	190 lb (86 kg)	December 11, 1960 (aged 23)	(Sweden) Södertälje SK
7	D	Bo Ericson	5 ft 10 in (178 cm)	179 lb (81 kg)	January 23, 1958 (aged 26)	(Sweden) Södertälje SK
27	D	Thomas Eriksson	6 ft 2 in (188 cm)	196 lb (89 kg)	October 16, 1959 (aged 24)	(United States) Philadelphia Flyers
4	D	Jan Lindholm	5 ft 10 in (178 cm)	181 lb (82 kg)	April 16, 1955 (aged 29)	(Sweden) IF Björklöven
2	D	Mats Thelin	5 ft 11 in (180 cm)	187 lb (85 kg)	March 30, 1961 (aged 23)	(United States) Boston Bruins
5	D	Michael Thelvén	6 ft 0 in (183 cm)	179 lb (81 kg)	January 7, 1961 (aged 23)	(Sweden) Djurgårdens IF
10	D	Thomas Åhlén	6 ft 0 in (183 cm)	196 lb (89 kg)	March 8, 1959 (aged 25)	(Sweden) Skellefteå AIK
29	F	Jan Claesson	6 ft 2 in (188 cm)	198 lb (90 kg)	January 8, 1958 (aged 26)	(Sweden) Djurgårdens IF
24	F	Pelle Eklund	5 ft 10 in (178 cm)	185 lb (84 kg)	March 22, 1963 (aged 21)	(Sweden) AIK
23	F	Thomas Gradin (C)	5 ft 11 in (180 cm)	174 lb (79 kg)	February 18, 1956 (aged 28)	(Canada) Vancouver Canucks
16	F	Bengt-Åke Gustafsson	6 ft 0 in (183 cm)	198 lb (90 kg)	March 23, 1958 (aged 26)	(United States) Washington Capitals
22	F	Anders Håkansson	6 ft 2 in (188 cm)	192 lb (87 kg)	April 20, 1956 (aged 28)	(United States) Los Angeles Kings
12	F	Håkan Loob	5 ft 9 in (175 cm)	176 lb (80 kg)	July 3, 1960 (aged 24)	(Canada) Calgary Flames
13	F	Kent Nilsson	6 ft 0 in (183 cm)	187 lb (85 kg)	August 31, 1956 (aged 28)	(Canada) Calgary Flames
26	F	Mats Näslund	5 ft 7 in (170 cm)	161 lb (73 kg)	October 31, 1959 (aged 24)	(Canada) Montreal Canadiens
28	F	Tomas Sandström	6 ft 2 in (188 cm)	209 lb (95 kg)	September 4, 1964 (aged 20)	(United States) New York Rangers
21	F	Thomas Steen	5 ft 10 in (178 cm)	170 lb (77 kg)	June 8, 1960 (aged 24)	(Canada) Winnipeg Jets
17	F	Patrik Sundström	6 ft 0 in (183 cm)	205 lb (93 kg)	December 14, 1961 (aged 22)	(Canada) Vancouver Canucks
18	F	Peter Sundström	6 ft 0 in (183 cm)	181 lb (82 kg)	December 14, 1961 (aged 22)	(United States) New York Rangers

== United States ==
Head coach: Bob Johnson

No.	Pos.	Name	Height	Weight	Birthdate	1984-85 Team
33	G	Tom Barasso	6 ft 3 in (191 cm)	209 lb (95 kg)	March 31, 1965 (aged 19)	(United States) Buffalo Sabres
1	G	Chico Resch	5 ft 9 in (175 cm)	165 lb (75 kg)	July 10, 1948 (aged 36)	(United States) New Jersey Devils
21	D	Chris Chelios	6 ft 0 in (183 cm)	192 lb (87 kg)	January 25, 1962 (aged 22)	(Canada) Montreal Canadiens
2	D	Mark Fusco	5 ft 9 in (175 cm)	176 lb (80 kg)	March 12, 1961 (aged 23)	(United States) Hartford Whalers
22	D	Tom Hirsch	6 ft 4 in (193 cm)	209 lb (95 kg)	January 27, 1963 (aged 21)	(United States) Springfield Indians (Note: Played 15 games with the Minnesota North Stars, Springfield's NHL affiliate)
4	D	Phil Housley	5 ft 10 in (178 cm)	179 lb (81 kg)	March 9, 1964 (aged 20)	(United States) Buffalo Sabres
5	D	Rod Langway (C)	6 ft 3 in (191 cm)	218 lb (99 kg)	May 3, 1957 (aged 27)	(United States) Washington Capitals
3	D	Mike Ramsey	6 ft 3 in (191 cm)	212 lb (96 kg)	December 3, 1960 (aged 23)	(United States) Buffalo Sabres
10	D	Gordie Roberts	6 ft 0 in (183 cm)	194 lb (88 kg)	October 2, 1957 (aged 26)	(United States) Minnesota North Stars
13	F	Bob Brooke	5 ft 11 in (180 cm)	194 lb (88 kg)	December 18, 1960 (aged 23)	(United States) New York Rangers
23	F	Aaron Broten	5 ft 10 in (178 cm)	174 lb (79 kg)	November 14, 1960 (aged 23)	(United States) New Jersey Devils
8	F	Neal Broten	5 ft 9 in (175 cm)	170 lb (77 kg)	November 29, 1959 (aged 24)	(United States) Minnesota North Stars
9	F	Bobby Carpenter	6 ft 0 in (183 cm)	201 lb (91 kg)	July 13, 1963 (aged 21)	(United States) Washington Capitals
27	F	Dave Christian	5 ft 11 in (180 cm)	176 lb (80 kg)	May 12, 1959 (aged 25)	(United States) Washington Capitals
24	F	Bryan Erickson	5 ft 9 in (175 cm)	174 lb (79 kg)	March 7, 1960 (aged 24)	(United States) Binghamton Whalers (Note: Played 57 games with the Washington Capitals, Binghamton's NHL affiliate)
25	F	David Jensen	6 ft 1 in (185 cm)	194 lb (88 kg)	August 19, 1965 (aged 19)	(United States) Hartford Whalers (Note: Played 40 games with the Binghamton Whalers, Hartford's NHL affiliate)
12	F	Mark Johnson	5 ft 9 in (175 cm)	161 lb (73 kg)	September 22, 1957 (aged 26)	(United States) Hartford Whalers (Note: Began season with Hartford before being traded to the St. Louis Blues)
98	F	Brian Lawton	6 ft 0 in (183 cm)	181 lb (82 kg)	June 29, 1965 (aged 19)	(United States) Minnesota North Stars (Note: Played 42 games with the Springfield Indians, Minnesota's AHL affiliate)
20	F	Brian Mullen	5 ft 10 in (178 cm)	181 lb (82 kg)	March 16, 1962 (aged 22)	(Canada) Winnipeg Jets
15	F	Joe Mullen	5 ft 10 in (178 cm)	183 lb (83 kg)	February 26, 1957 (aged 27)	(United States) St. Louis Blues
11	F	Eddie Olczyk	6 ft 1 in (185 cm)	201 lb (91 kg)	August 16, 1966 (aged 18)	(United States) Chicago Black Hawks
19	F	Bryan Trottier	5 ft 11 in (180 cm)	194 lb (88 kg)	June 17, 1956 (aged 28)	(United States) New York Islanders

== USSR ==
Head coach: Viktor Tikhonov

Assistant coach: Vladimir Yurzinov

No.	Pos.	Name	Height	Weight	Birthdate	Team
1	G	Vladimir Myshkin	5 ft 11 in (180 cm)	154 lb (70 kg)	June 19, 1955 (aged 29)	(Soviet Union) Dynamo Moskva
22	G	Alexander Tyznykh	6 ft 0 in (183 cm)	176 lb (80 kg)	May 26, 1958 (aged 26)	(Soviet Union) CSKA Moskva
14	D	Zinetula Bilyaletdinov	5 ft 11 in (180 cm)	190 lb (86 kg)	March 13, 1955 (aged 29)	(Soviet Union) Dynamo Moskva
18	D	Irek Gimayev	5 ft 10 in (178 cm)	194 lb (88 kg)	September 2, 1957 (aged 27)	(Soviet Union) CSKA Moskva
8	D	Alexei Gusarov	6 ft 1 in (185 cm)	198 lb (90 kg)	July 8, 1964 (aged 20)	(Soviet Union) CSKA Moskva
7	D	Alexei Kasatonov	6 ft 1 in (185 cm)	196 lb (89 kg)	October 14, 1959 (aged 24)	(Soviet Union) CSKA Moskva
5	D	Vasili Pervukhin	5 ft 11 in (180 cm)	203 lb (92 kg)	January 1, 1956 (aged 28)	(Soviet Union) Dynamo Moskva
12	D	Sergei Starikov	5 ft 10 in (178 cm)	225 lb (102 kg)	December 4, 1958 (aged 25)	(Soviet Union) CSKA Moskva
4	D	Igor Stelnov	6 ft 0 in (183 cm)	209 lb (95 kg)	February 12, 1963 (aged 21)	(Soviet Union) CSKA Moskva
3	D	Vladimir Zubkov	6 ft 2 in (188 cm)	198 lb (90 kg)	January 14, 1958 (aged 26)	(Soviet Union) CSKA Moskva
31	F	Vladimir Kovin	6 ft 0 in (183 cm)	198 lb (90 kg)	June 20, 1954 (aged 30)	(Soviet Union) Torpedo Gorky
29	F	Alexander Kozhevnikov	6 ft 3 in (191 cm)	194 lb (88 kg)	September 21, 1958 (aged 25)	(Soviet Union) Spartak Moskva
9	F	Vladimir Krutov	5 ft 9 in (175 cm)	194 lb (88 kg)	June 1, 1960 (aged 24)	(Soviet Union) CSKA Moskva
11	F	Igor Larionov	5 ft 9 in (175 cm)	172 lb (78 kg)	December 3, 1960 (aged 23)	(Soviet Union) CSKA Moskva
24	F	Sergei Makarov	5 ft 11 in (180 cm)	183 lb (83 kg)	June 19, 1958 (aged 26)	(Soviet Union) CSKA Moskva
30	F	Anatoli Semyonov	6 ft 2 in (188 cm)	190 lb (86 kg)	March 5, 1962 (aged 22)	(Soviet Union) Dynamo Moskva
21	F	Sergei Shepelev	5 ft 10 in (178 cm)	176 lb (80 kg)	October 13, 1955 (aged 28)	(Soviet Union) Spartak Moskva
26	F	Alexander Skvortsov	5 ft 7 in (170 cm)	190 lb (86 kg)	August 28, 1954 (aged 30)	(Soviet Union) Torpedo Gorky
16	F	Sergei Svetlov	6 ft 2 in (188 cm)	194 lb (88 kg)	January 17, 1961 (aged 23)	(Soviet Union) Dynamo Moskva
19	F	Mikhail Varnakov	5 ft 9 in (175 cm)	165 lb (75 kg)	June 25, 1957 (aged 27)	(Soviet Union) Torpedo Gorky
28	F	Mikhail Vasilyev	6 ft 0 in (183 cm)	185 lb (84 kg)	June 8, 1962 (aged 22)	(Soviet Union) CSKA Moskva
25	F	Sergei Yashin	5 ft 11 in (180 cm)	205 lb (93 kg)	March 6, 1962 (aged 22)	(Soviet Union) Dynamo Moskva

== West Germany ==
Head coach: Xaver Unsinn

No.	Pos.	Name	Height	Weight	Birthdate	Team
29	G	Bernhard Englbrecht	5 ft 8 in (173 cm)	163 lb (74 kg)	February 16, 1958 (aged 26)	(Germany) EV Landshut
27	G	Karl Friesen	6 ft 0 in (183 cm)	165 lb (75 kg)	June 30, 1958 (aged 26)	(Germany) Sportbund DJK Rosenheim
19	D	Ignaz Berndaner (C)	5 ft 9 in (175 cm)	174 lb (79 kg)	July 4, 1954 (aged 30)	(Germany) SC Riessersee
5	D	Rainer Blum	6 ft 2 in (188 cm)	203 lb (92 kg)	January 18, 1960 (aged 24)	(Germany) Sportbund DJK Rosenheim
25	D	Uli Hiemer	6 ft 1 in (185 cm)	190 lb (86 kg)	September 21, 1962 (aged 21)	(United States) New Jersey Devils
4	D	Udo Kießling	5 ft 11 in (180 cm)	185 lb (84 kg)	May 21, 1955 (aged 29)	(Germany) Kölner EC
18	D	Dieter Medicus	6 ft 4 in (193 cm)	212 lb (96 kg)	April 7, 1957 (aged 27)	(Germany) ESV Kaufbeuren
3	D	Andreas Niederberger	5 ft 10 in (178 cm)	181 lb (82 kg)	April 20, 1963 (aged 21)	(Germany) Mannheimer ERC
6	D	Joachim Reil	5 ft 10 in (178 cm)	183 lb (83 kg)	May 17, 1955 (aged 29)	(Germany) ECD Iserlohn
8	D	Peter Scharf	5 ft 9 in (175 cm)	183 lb (83 kg)	July 15, 1953 (aged 31)	(Germany) Sportbund DJK Rosenheim
28	F	Michael Betz	6 ft 0 in (183 cm)	176 lb (80 kg)	February 19, 1962 (aged 22)	(Germany) Sportbund DJK Rosenheim
23	F	Dieter Hegen	6 ft 0 in (183 cm)	198 lb (90 kg)	April 29, 1962 (aged 22)	(Germany) ESV Kaufbeuren
9	F	Ernst Höfner	5 ft 10 in (178 cm)	172 lb (78 kg)	September 21, 1957 (aged 26)	(Germany) Sportbund DJK Rosenheim
15	F	Marcus Kuhl	5 ft 10 in (178 cm)	176 lb (80 kg)	March 15, 1956 (aged 28)	(Germany) Kölner EC
16	F	Holger Meitinger	5 ft 11 in (180 cm)	170 lb (77 kg)	March 28, 1957 (aged 27)	(Germany) Kölner EC
12	F	Peter Obresa	5 ft 9 in (175 cm)	165 lb (75 kg)	August 6, 1960 (aged 24)	(Germany) Mannheimer ERC
10	F	Franz Reindl	5 ft 11 in (180 cm)	174 lb (79 kg)	November 24, 1954 (aged 29)	(Germany) Sportbund DJK Rosenheim
22	F	Roy Roedger	6 ft 4 in (193 cm)	203 lb (92 kg)	October 11, 1958 (aged 25)	(Germany) Mannheimer ERC
7	F	Peter Schiller	5 ft 10 in (178 cm)	172 lb (78 kg)	June 25, 1957 (aged 27)	(Germany) Kölner EC
24	F	Helmut Steiger	5 ft 10 in (178 cm)	176 lb (80 kg)	January 5, 1959 (aged 25)	(Germany) EV Landshut
17	F	Gerd Truntschka	5 ft 9 in (175 cm)	165 lb (75 kg)	September 10, 1958 (aged 26)	(Germany) Kölner EC
11	F	Manfred Wolf	6 ft 0 in (183 cm)	187 lb (85 kg)	March 26, 1957 (aged 27)	(Germany) Mannheimer ERC
