= Nordic combined at the 1976 Winter Olympics =

Nordic combined at the XII Olympic Winter Games
- Venue: Seefeld in Tirol
- Dates: 8–9 February 1976
- Competitors: 34 from 14 nations
- Winning Score: 423.390

Medalists
1st place, gold medalist(s)		Ulrich Wehling	East Germany
2nd place, silver medalist(s)		Urban Hettich	West Germany
3rd place, bronze medalist(s)		Konrad Winkler	East Germany

Nordic combined at the 1976 Winter Olympics, consisted of one event, held from 8 February to 9 February at Seefeld.

== Medal summary ==
=== Medal table ===
Rank	Nation	Gold	Silver	Bronze	Total
1	East Germany	1	0	1	2
2	West Germany	0	1	0	1
Totals (2 entries)		1	1	1	3

Germany won all three medals, with the East Germans topping the table with two and West Germany winning the third.

=== Events ===
Event	Gold		Silver		Bronze	
Individual	Ulrich Wehling; East Germany	423.39	Urban Hettich; West Germany	418.90	Konrad Winkler; East Germany	417.47

== Individual ==
Athletes did three normal hill ski jumps, with the lowest score dropped. They then raced a 15 kilometre cross-country course, with the time converted to points. The athlete with the highest combined points score was awarded the gold medal.

Rank	Name	Country	Ski Jumping					Cross-country			Total
Rank	Name	Country	Jump 1	Jump 2	Jump 3	Total	Rank	Time	Points	Rank	Total
1st place, gold medalist(s)	Ulrich Wehling	East Germany	~~112.0~~	112.5	113.0	225.5	1	50:28.9	197.89	13	423.39
2nd place, silver medalist(s)	Urban Hettich	West Germany	~~97.1~~	98.7	100.2	198.9	11	48:01.5	220.00	1	418.90
3rd place, bronze medalist(s)	Konrad Winkler	East Germany	107.0	~~105.9~~	106.9	213.9	4	49:51.1	203.57	7	417.47
4	Rauno Miettinen	Finland	109.3	110.6	~~101.4~~	219.9	2	51:12.2	191.40	19	411.30
5	Claus Tuchscherer	East Germany	~~103.2~~	109.1	109.6	218.7	3	51:16.1	190.81	20	409.51
6	Nikolay Nogovitsyn	Soviet Union	99.5	~~95.2~~	96.6	196.1	16	49:06.0	210.34	3	406.44
7	Valery Kopayev	Soviet Union	102.2	~~94.4~~	100.7	202.9	9	49:53.3	203.24	8	406.14
8	Tom Sandberg	Norway	96.3	~~94.7~~	99.4	195.7	17	49:09.3	209.83	4	405.53
9	Pål Schjetne	Norway	~~97.2~~	102.1	102.3	204.4	7	50:27.0	198.19	12	402.59
10	Erkki Kilpinen	Finland	~~70.5~~	100.9	102.2	203.1	8	50:20.5	199.16	11	402.26
11	Jukka Kuvaja	Finland	98.9	~~87.8~~	98.4	197.3	13	50:03.3	201.74	9	399.04
12	Josef Pospíšil	Czechoslovakia	95.0	~~94.7~~	102.9	197.9	12	50:14.7	200.03	10	397.93
13	Günter Deckert	East Germany	~~74.0~~	95.1	99.1	194.2	18	49:51.0	203.58	6	397.78
14	Günther Abel	West Germany	101.2	~~91.7~~	95.6	196.8	14	50:29.8	197.77	14	394.57
15	František Zeman	Czechoslovakia	~~89.2~~	94.7	95.2	189.9	21	51:00.2	193.21	16	383.11
16	Stefan Hula	Poland	~~98.7~~	101.0	104.9	205.9	6	52:48.4	176.98	26	382.88
17	Jim Galanes	United States	~~88.6~~	90.6	93.5	184.1	25	50:34.7	197.03	15	381.13
18	Jan Legierski	Poland	88.9	86.8	~~85.8~~	175.7	28	49:39.0	205.38	5	381.08
19	Karl Lustenberger	Switzerland	101.8	100.7	~~98.4~~	202.5	10	52:57.5	175.60	27	378.10
20	Marek Pach	Poland	94.7	~~93.2~~	96.6	191.3	19	52:05.0	183.49	22	374.79
21	Yuji Katsuro	Japan	~~91.6~~	104.5	105.3	209.8	5	54:15.7	163.87	29	373.67
22	Stein Erik Gullikstad	Norway	79.5	~~72.5~~	82.6	162.1	31	49:04.1	210.62	2	372.72
23	Aleksey Baranov	Soviet Union	93.7	92.0	~~88.1~~	185.7	23	51:58.4	184.47	21	370.17
24	Jorma Etelälahti	Finland	92.7	~~74.3~~	92.4	185.1	24	52:05.8	183.36	23	368.46
25	Jacques Gaillard	France	~~89.1~~	91.1	89.9	181.0	27	52:08.9	182.90	24	363.90
26	Fritz Koch	Austria	~~93.2~~	95.2	93.9	189.1	22	53:04.7	174.52	28	363.62
27	Arne Bystøl	Norway	~~80.1~~	81.9	84.6	166.5	30	51:02.8	192.81	17	359.31
28	Mike Devecka	United States	77.0	~~69.6~~	74.6	151.6	32	51:06.4	192.28	18	343.88
29	Walter Malmquist	United States	~~80.1~~	90.0	91.3	181.3	26	54:40.4	160.17	30	341.47
30	Michio Kubota	Japan	~~93.7~~	98.4	97.9	196.3	15	56:39.4	142.32	32	338.62
31	Francesco Giacomelli	Italy	~~89.1~~	94.2	96.1	190.3	20	56:08.8	146.92	31	337.22
32	Modesto De Silvestro	Italy	71.1	68.7	~~26.2~~	139.8	33	52:27.6	180.09	25	319.89
33	Kurt Sjolund	Canada	66.1	~~27.7~~	57.9	124.0	34	58:13.4	128.22	33	252.22
-	Stanisław Kawulok	Poland	83.7	~~81.5~~	89.1	172.8	29	DNF	DNF	-	-

== Participating National Olympic Committees ==
Fourteen nations participated in the Nordic combined at the Innsbruck Games.

- Austria (1)
- Canada (1)
- Finland (4)
- France (1)
- West Germany (2)
- East Germany (4)
- Italy (2)
- Japan (2)
- Norway (4)
- Poland (4)
- Switzerland (1)
- Czechoslovakia (2)
- Soviet Union (3)
- United States (3)
