= Aleksei Baranov =

Aleksei Baranov may refer to:

- Aleksey Baranov (skier) (born 1954), Soviet Olympic skier
- Aleksei Baranov (footballer) (born 1980), Russian footballer
