= Sjölund =

Sjölund is a Swedish surname. It is a contraction of sjö (lake) and lund (grove or copse). Notable people with the surname include:

- Anne-Li Sjölund (born 1966) a Swedish politician
- Annica Sjölund (born 1985), a Finnish footballer
- Daniel Sjölund (born 1983), a Finnish footballer
- Kurt Sjolund (born 1955), a Canadian skier
