= Kehle =

Kehle may refer to:

== People ==
- Anton Kehle (1947–1997), German ice hockey player

== Places ==
- Kehle Glacier, Antarctica
