= Manfred Schuster =

German ice hockey player

Personal information
- Nationality: German
- Born: 14 February 1958 (age 67); Kaufbeuren, West Germany

Sport
- Sport: Ice hockey

Manfred Schuster (born 14 February 1958) is a German ice hockey player. He competed in the men's tournament at the 1988 Winter Olympics.
