= František Zeman =

Czech Nordic combined skier

Personal information
- Nationality: Czech
- Born: 10 October 1950 (age 74); Vysoké nad Jizerou, Czechoslovakia

Sport
- Sport: Nordic combined

František Zeman (born 10 October 1950) is a Czech former skier. He competed in the Nordic combined event at the 1976 Winter Olympics.
