= Modesto De Silvestro =

Italian Nordic combined skier

Personal information
- Nationality: Italian
- Born: 21 June 1950 (age 74)

Sport
- Sport: Nordic combined

Modesto De Silvestro (born 21 June 1950) is an Italian skier. He competed in the Nordic combined event at the 1976 Winter Olympics.
