= Maria Crescentia Höss =

Religious sister and saint (1682–1744)

Saint Maria Crescentia TOR
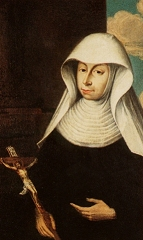

Virgin
- Born: 20 October 1682; Kaufbeuren, Bavaria
- Died: 5 April 1744; Kaufbeuren
- Venerated in: Roman Catholic Church
- Beatified: 1900 by Pope Leo XIII
- Canonized: 25 November 2001 by John Paul II
- Major shrine: Crescentiakloster, Kaufbeuren, Germany
- Feast: 5 or 6 April

Maria Crescentia Höss (Höß), TOR (1682–1744) was a religious sister of the Third Order Regular of St. Francis. In 1900, she was beatified by Pope Leo XIII, and she was canonized in 2001 by Pope John Paul II.

== Early life ==
Anna Höss was born on 20 October 1682 in Kaufbeuren, in Bavaria, Germany, to Matthias Höss and his wife, Lucia Hoermann, as the sixth of their eight children. Only three of the children survived into adulthood.

Anna became a weaver, but her greatest ambition was to enter the local convent of the Tertiary Franciscans in Kaufbeuren, which occupied the old Meierhof of the town, in whose chapel she often prayed. As a poor weaver, however, her father did not have enough money to pay the customary dowry expected of a candidate, so she was not admitted.

== Monasteries of the Third Order Regular ==
Unlike monasteries of the nuns of the Franciscan Second Order, known as the Poor Clares, the sisters of the Third Order were completely local, living under the authority of the local bishop. The history of the Third Order of St. Francis had a range of organizational models, in that many communities of religious sisters did not embrace the enclosure, but considered active works of charity, tending to the poor and sick, as part of their Franciscan charism. Monasteries like that of Kaufbeuren were established to pursue the purely contemplative life, usually in an urban setting.

The Order of Friars Minor, however, refused to accept spiritual supervision or responsibility for those monasteries which did not accept the strictest form of enclosure, such as the Poor Clares had. Thus the monastic communities of the Third Order like that of Kaufbeuren, who did not have the same connection with the public as did the active Sisters, were usually entirely dependent on the local clergy for spiritual direction and on local patrons for their survival. They were often marked by their precarious financial situations.

== Life in the monastery ==
In 1703 the Mayor of Kaufbeuren, a Protestant, performed a major service to the monastery by purchasing a tavern adjacent to it which was often the source of disturbance to the quiet of the cloister, and donating the building to the sisters. He refused compensation but asked simply that, in return, Anna be accepted as a candidate. As a result of this intervention, the mother superior (German: Oberin) of the monastery felt obligated to receive her, and Anna was admitted in June of that year. The superior, however, resented this and referred to Anna as a "parasite", since she was felt not to be contributing to the community. Nevertheless, Anna received the religious habit and took the name Maria Crescentia.

The sisters were not kind to her at first, due to the manner of her admission. Once clothed as a member of the Order, Crescentia was subjected to a prolonged persecution by the unfriendly superior and some of the older sisters. They treated her as a servant, giving her the most menial tasks to perform. Although Crescentia was at first given a cell of her own, it was later taken from her and given to a new novice who had brought with her the customary dowry. Thereafter she had to beg the other sisters for a corner of their cells in which she might sleep. When she was finally given a place of her own again, it was a dark and damp cubbyhole. Nevertheless, Crescentia was allowed to profess vows and become a full member of the monastic community. She was assigned to serve in the kitchen and did the weaving for the monastery.

Eventually, in 1707, a new superior was elected who was more sympathetic to Crescentia, and she was entrusted first with the important office of portress, and in 1717 she was appointed mistress of novices. At this stage of her monastic life, Crescentia was a prolific letter writer, who left many letters to people in various social positions, in which she gave them advice and comfort in their worries.

Though by then she had begun to suffer from poor health, even paralysis, in 1741 she was elected as the monastery's mother superior, serving in that office until her death on 5 April, Easter Sunday, 1744.

During her short tenure in this position of leadership of the community, Mother Crescentia led a renewal of their way of life. She counseled unlimited trust in Divine Providence, readiness to serve in community life, a love of silence, devotion to the Crucified Jesus, to the Blessed Sacrament and to the Blessed Mother. She encouraged the sisters to turn to the Gospels to develop their inner spiritual life, and was noted for the selectivity of her choices regarding candidates to the community. She justified this by saying: "God wants the monastery rich in virtue, not in temporal goods".

== Veneration ==
The process of her canonization was begun in 1775. The secularization of monasteries which occurred in the Revolutionary upheavals of the late 18th century and the anti-Catholic policies of the German government during the Kulturkampf of the 19th century prevented the monastic community from proceeding with the process.

Finally, in 1900, Mother Crescentia was beatified by Pope Leo XIII. She was canonized on 25 November 2001 by Pope John Paul II, along with three others. Her monastery was then renamed St. Crescentia Monastery (German: Crescentiakloster) in her honor.

== See also ==
- Third Order of St. Francis
