= Pål Schjetne =

Norwegian Nordic combined skier

Personal information
- Nationality: Norwegian
- Born: 6 June 1953 Trondheim
- Died: 11 July 2008 (aged 55)

Sport
- Sport: Nordic combined skiing

Pål Schjetne (6 June 1953 – 11 July 2008) was a Norwegian Nordic combined skier.

He was born in Trondheim. Growing up in the neighborhood Nidarvoll, he represented the club Nidelv IL. After marrying in 1973, he moved to Gjøvik and represented the club Redalen IL.

He finished ninth at the 1976 Winter Olympics in Innsbruck. He was Norwegian champion in 1974.

After retiring he worked for Madshus and Sport1, among others. He died in July 2008.
