= Josef Pospíšil =

Czech Nordic combined skier

Personal information
- Nationality: Czech
- Born: 19 April 1953 (age 72); Nové Město na Moravě, Czechoslovakia

Sport
- Sport: Nordic combined

Josef Pospíšil (born 19 April 1953) is a Czech former skier. He competed in the Nordic combined event at the 1976 Winter Olympics.
