= Pavol Svitana =

Slovak ice hockey player

Personal information
- Nationality: Slovak
- Born: 2 September 1948 (age 77) Matejovce, Czechoslovakia

Pavol Svitana (born 2 September 1948) is a Slovak ice hockey player. He was named to the Czechoslovak national team for the men's tournament at the 1976 Winter Olympics, but he did not play.
