= Georg Zipfel =

German skier (born 1953)

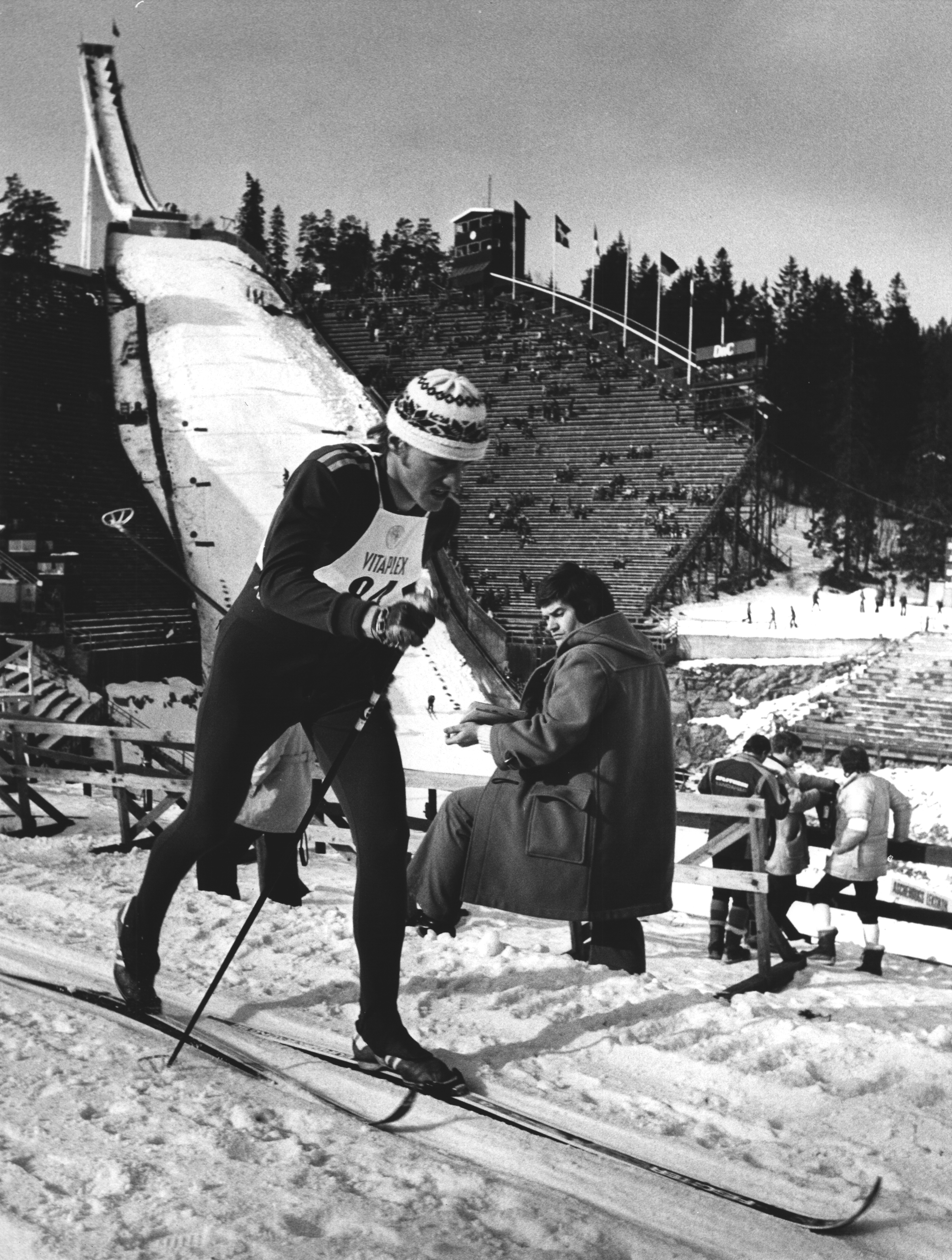
- Georg Zipfel in March, 1976

Personal information
- Nationality: German
- Born: 13 May 1953 (age 71); Freiburg im Breisgau, West Germany

Sport
- Sport: Cross-country skiing
- Club: SV Kirchzarten

Georg Zipfel (born 13 May 1953) is a German cross-country skier. He competed in the men's 15 kilometre event at the 1976 Winter Olympics.
