= Aleksey Baranov (skier) =

Soviet Nordic combined skier

Personal information
- Nationality: Soviet
- Born: 26 May 1954 (age 70)

Sport
- Sport: Nordic combined

Aleksey Baranov (born 26 May 1954) is a Soviet skier. He competed in the Nordic combined event at the 1976 Winter Olympics.
