= Milan Kajkl =

Czech ice hockey player

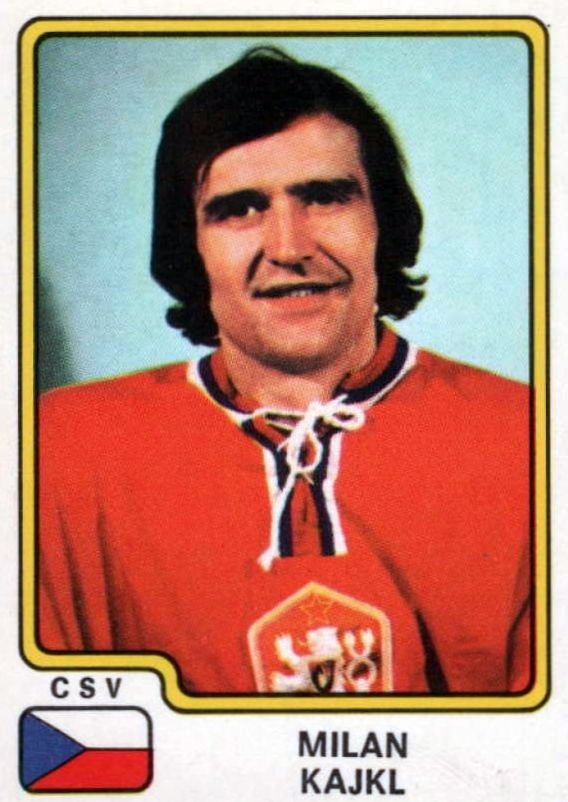
- Born: 14 May 1950 Plzeň, Czechoslovakia
- Died: 18 January 2014 (aged 63) Plzeň, Czech Republic
- Height: 6 ft 0 in (183 cm)
- Weight: 194 lb (88 kg; 13 st 12 lb)
- Position: Defence
- Played for: Klagenfurter AC (Austria); HC Plzen (CSSR); HC Dukla Jihlava (CSSR)
- National team: Czechoslovakia
- Playing career: 1969–1983
Medal record
Men's ice hockey
Representing Czechoslovakia
Olympic Games
Silver medal – second place	1976 Innsbruck	Team

Milan Kajkl (14 May 1950 – 18 January 2014) was a Czechoslovak Olympic ice hockey player.

== Early life ==
Kajkl was born in Plzeň, Czechoslovakia. He participated at the 1976 Winter Olympics in Innsbruck, where his team won a Silver medal.

== Death ==
Kajkl died in Plzeň on 18 January 2014 at the age of 63.
