= Horst Freese =

German speed skater

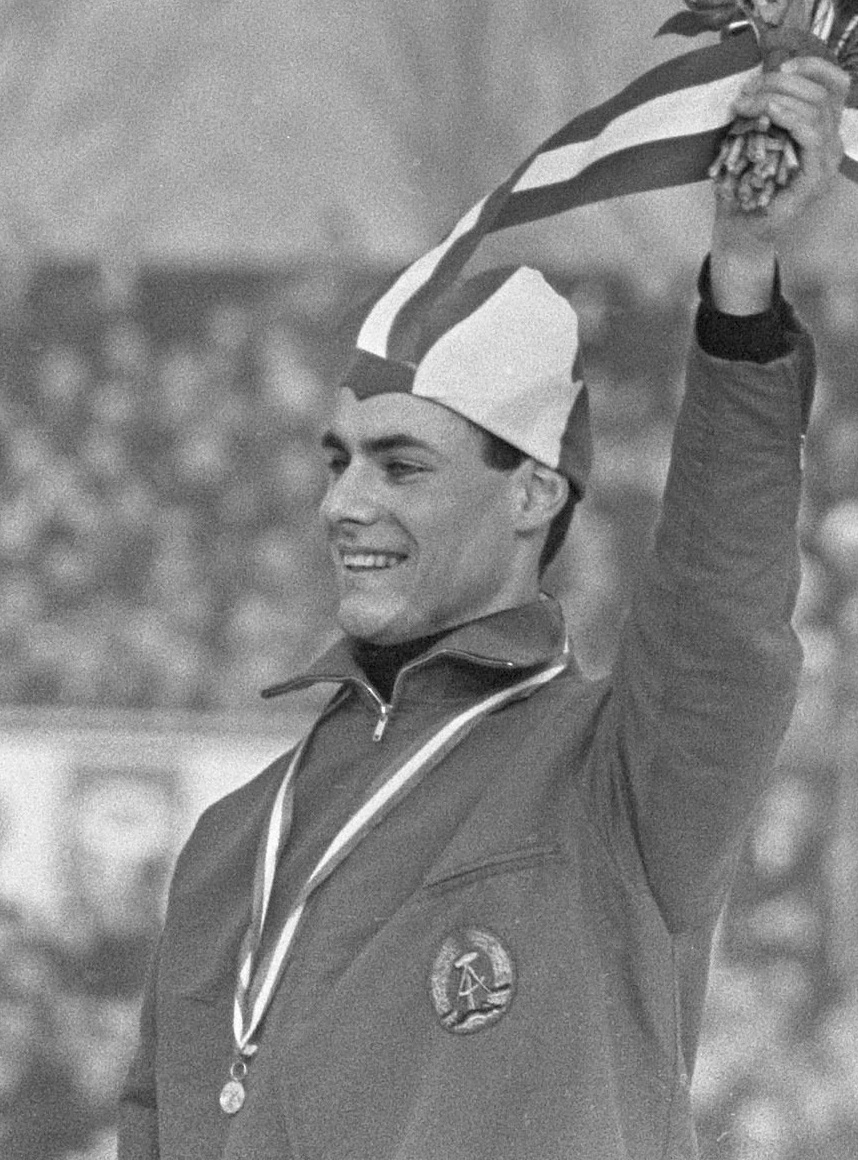
- Horst Freese in 1966

Personal information
- Born: 30 January 1944 (age 82) Rostock, Germany
- Height: 1.78 m (5 ft 10 in)
- Weight: 77 kg (170 lb)

Sport
- Sport: Speed skating
- Club: Altonaer SV, Hamburg

Horst Freese (born 30 January 1944) is a retired German speed skater. He finished in ninth place in the 1000 m at the 1976 Winter Olympics and fell on 500 m.

He was born and raised in East Germany, but in 1969 fled to West Germany.

Personal bests:

- 500 m – 38.7 (1972)
- 1000 m – 1:19.80 (1976)
- 1500 m – 2:07.78 (1974)
- 5000 m – 8:12.4 (1967)
- 10000 – 17:28.5 (1966)
