= Georg Kandlinger =

German cross-country skier (1949–2020)

Personal information
- Nationality: German
- Born: 20 March 1949; Rottach-Egern, Germany
- Died: 16 November 2020 (aged 71)

Sport
- Sport: Cross-country skiing

Georg Kandlinger (20 March 1949 – 16 November 2020) was a German cross-country skier. He competed in the men's 15 kilometre event at the 1976 Winter Olympics.
