= Sergei Babinov =

Russian ice hockey player (born 1955)

- Born: July 11, 1955 (age 71) Chelyabinsk, Russian SFSR, Soviet Union
- Height: 5 ft 11 in (180 cm)
- Weight: 183 lb (83 kg; 13 st 1 lb)
- Position: Defence
- Shot: Left
- Played for: Traktor Chelyabinsk; Krylya Sovetov Moscow; HC CSKA Moscow; Brest Albatros Hockey
- National team: Soviet Union
- Playing career: 1972–1995
Medal record
Men's ice hockey
Representing Soviet Union
Olympic Games
Gold medal – first place	1976 Innsbruck	Team
World Championships
Silver medal – second place	1976 Poland
Bronze medal – third place	1977 Austria
Gold medal – first place	1979 Soviet Union
Gold medal – first place	1981 Sweden
Gold medal – first place	1982 Finland
Gold medal – first place	1983 West Germany
Canada Cup
Gold medal – first place	1981 Canada
World Junior Championships
Gold medal – first place	1974 Leningrad	Ice hockey
Gold medal – first place	1975 Canada/USA	Ice hockey

Sergei Pantilimonovich Babinov (Russian: Сергей Пантилимонович Бабинов; born 11 July 1955 in Chelyabinsk, Soviet Union) is a retired ice hockey player who played in the Soviet Hockey League.

Babinov played for Traktor Chelyabinsk, Krylya Sovetov Moscow and HC CSKA Moscow. He competed at the 1976 Winter Olympics as well as at the Canada Cups both in 1976 and 1981. He was inducted into the Russian and Soviet Hockey Hall of Fame in 1979.
