= Wolfgang Junginger =

German alpine skier (1951–1982)

Wolfgang Junginger (27 October 1951 – 17 February 1982) was a German alpine skier who competed in the 1976 Winter Olympics. There he finished on 6th place in Special Slalom and on 4th place in Alpine Combined. Two years before, in World Championships at St. Moritz (Switzerland), he won the bronze medal in Alpine Combined. Mr. Junginger died in an airplane crash when he piloted a small airplane from Munich to Hannover in Germany. Including the pilot himself there were four persons in the plane and one of them was Mr. Uli Hoeneß, well known manager of Bayern Munich. Mr. Hoeness was the only one who had survived the accident.
