= Dieter Medicus (ice hockey) =

German ice hockey player

Personal information
- Nationality: German
- Born: 7 April 1957 (age 69) Kaufbeuren, Germany

Sport
- Sport: Ice hockey

Dieter Medicus (born 7 April 1957) is a German ice hockey player. He competed in the men's tournament at the 1988 Winter Olympics.
