= Kurt Sjolund =

Canadian Nordic combined skier

Personal information
- Born: 7 January 1955 (age 70); Ottawa, Ontario, Canada

Sport
- Sport: Nordic combined

Kurt Sjolund (born 7 January 1955) is a Canadian skier. He competed in the Nordic combined event at the 1976 Winter Olympics.
