= Vladimír Kameš =

Czech ice hockey player

- Born: December 10, 1983 (age 41); Kladno, Czechoslovakia
- Height: 6 ft 1 in (185 cm)
- Weight: 181 lb (82 kg; 12 st 13 lb)
- Position: Defence
- Shoots: Right
- Czech Extraliga team: HC Kladno
- Playing career: 2003–present

Vladimír Kameš (born December 10, 1983) is a Czech professional ice hockey defenceman. He played with HC Kladno in the Czech Extraliga during the 2010–11 Czech Extraliga season.
