= Arne Bystøl =

Norwegian Nordic combined skier

Personal information
- Born: 6 May 1951 (age 75) Vossestrand Municipality, Norway

Sport
- Sport: Nordic combined skiing

Arne Bystøl (born 6 May 1951) is a Norwegian Nordic combined skier. He was born in Vossestrand Municipality and represented the club IL Eldar. He competed at the 1976 Winter Olympics in Innsbruck, where he was placed 27th. He is the uncle of Lars Bystøl.
