= Hans Speicher =

German cross-country skier (born 1952)

Personal information
- Nationality: German
- Born: 22 April 1952 (age 72); Reit im Winkl, West Germany

Sport
- Sport: Cross-country skiing

Hans Speicher (born 22 April 1952) is a German cross-country skier. He competed in the men's 15 kilometre event at the 1976 Winter Olympics.
