= Franz Betz (cross-country skier) =

German cross-country skier (born 1952)

Personal information
- Nationality: German
- Born: 18 January 1952 (age 73); Nesselwang, West Germany

Sport
- Sport: Cross-country skiing

Franz Betz (born 18 January 1952) is a German former cross-country skier. He competed at the 1972 Winter Olympics and the 1976 Winter Olympics.
