= Bodo Bittner =

West German bobsledder

Olympic medal record

Men's bobsleigh

Representing West Germany
Bronze medal – third place	1976 Innsbruck	Four-man

Bodo Bittner (2 February 1940 – 23 September 2012) was a West German bobsledder who competed in the late 1970s. He was born in Berlin. He won the bronze medal in the four-man event at the 1976 Winter Olympics in Innsbruck.
