= Helmut Steiger =

German ice hockey player

Personal information
- Nationality: German
- Born: 5 January 1959 (age 66); Landshut, West Germany

Sport
- Sport: Ice hockey

Helmut Steiger (born 5 January 1959) is a German ice hockey player. He competed in the men's tournaments at the 1984 Winter Olympics and the 1988 Winter Olympics.
