= Ice hockey at the 1976 Winter Olympics =

Tournament details
- Host country: Austria
- Dates: 2–14 February 1976
- Teams: 12

Final positions
- Champions: Soviet Union (5th title)
- Runners-up: Czechoslovakia
- Third place: West Germany
- Fourth place: Finland

Tournament statistics
- Games played: 36
- Goals scored: 323 (8.97 per game)
- Scoring leader: (Soviet Union) Vladimir Shadrin (14 points)

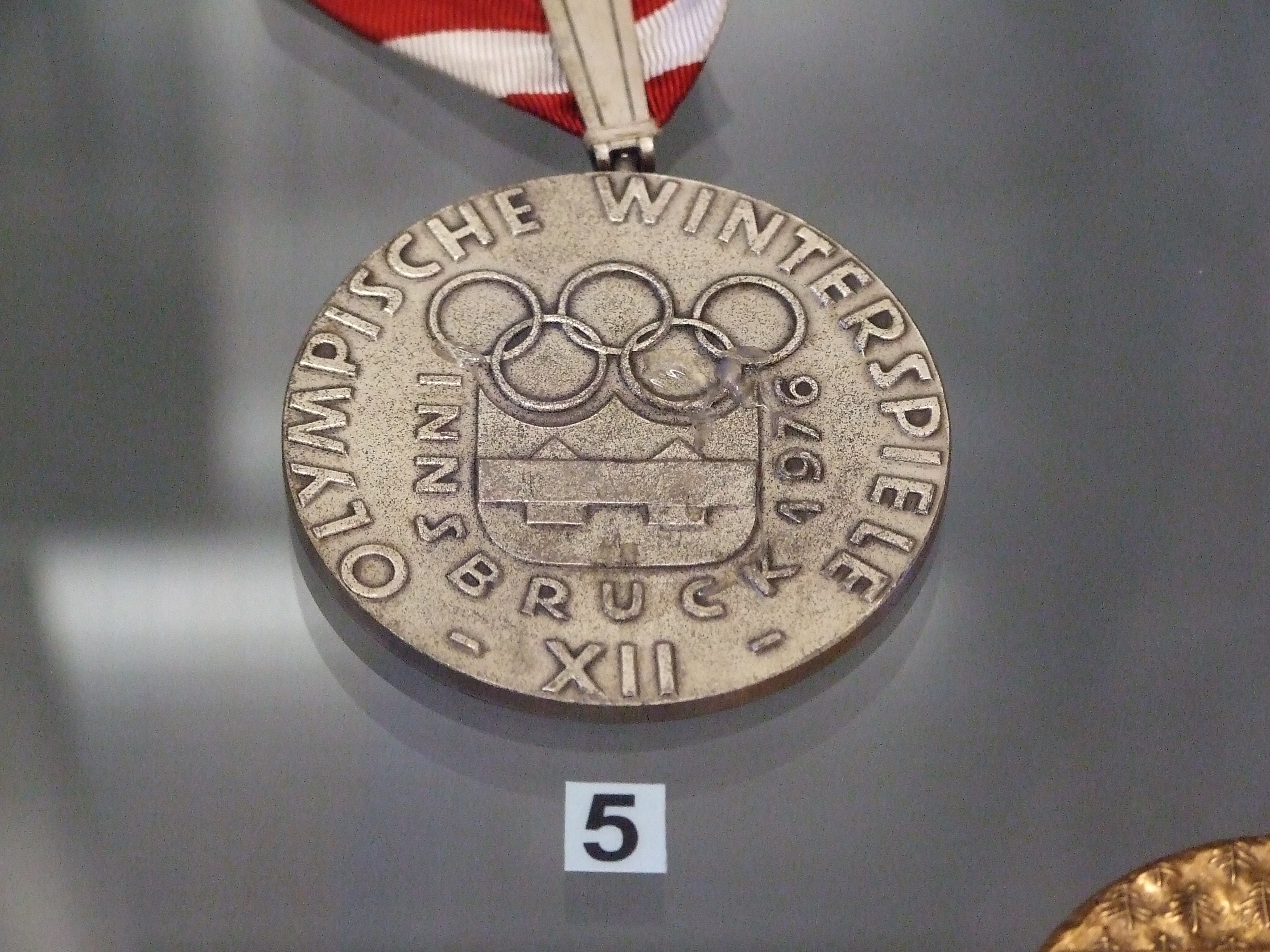
An ice hockey medal of the 1976 Winter Olympics

The men's ice hockey tournament at the 1976 Winter Olympics in Innsbruck, Austria, was the 13th Olympic Championship. The Soviet Union won its fifth gold medal. Games were held at the Olympiahalle Innsbruck.

== Highlights ==
The main rivalry in the tournament was between the USSR and Czechoslovak national teams. The Czechoslovak team suffered from influenza throughout the tournament, and they finished the game against Poland with only twelve players on the bench. A doping test of one of the players was positive and a loss was recorded for the Czechoslovak team, although Poland did not receive points.

In the deciding game, Czechoslovakia was up 2–0 after the first period. In the second, the score was tied by Vladimir Shadrin and Vladimir Petrov. Eight minutes before the end of the game Eduard Novák scored the third goal for the Czechoslovak team. But subsequent goals by Aleksandr Yakushev and one minute later by Valeri Kharlamov led to the victory of the USSR, 4–3. The Soviet team won their fourth consecutive gold medal and fifth title overall.

Heralded as one of the great moments in German ice hockey, the West German team won a surprising bronze. After beating the Americans on the final day the German team celebrated what they believed to be a fourth place finish. While in the locker room they were informed that they had actually come third. The three-way tie was broken by first comparing the teams' head-to-head goal differential, then the remaining tied teams' goal ratio.

Sweden, having several of their top players now playing in the NHL and WHA, chose to join Canada in protesting the amateur rules and boycotted the games. They were also dissatisfied with the fact that the Soviet and Czechoslovak state-funded players who were de facto professionals were allowed to participate, meaning that Eastern Bloc countries did have an ability to send their best players, but the Western nations did not.

== Medalists ==
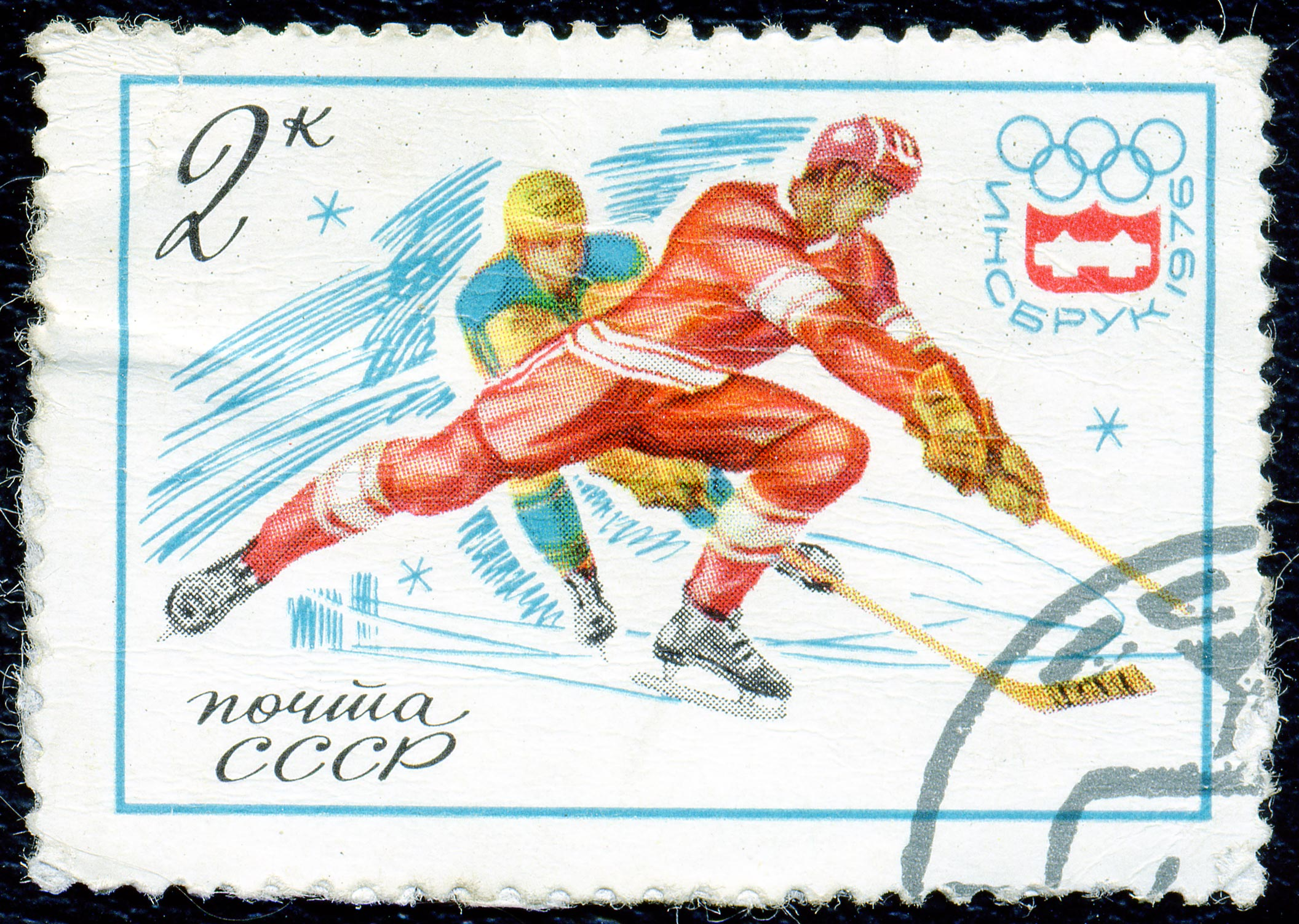
A Soviet postage stamp for the 1976 Winter Olympics

Gold	Silver	Bronze
Soviet Union Vladislav Tretiak; Aleksandr Sidelnikov; Aleksandr Gusev; Vladimir Lutchenko; Sergei Babinov; Yury Lyapkin; Gennadiy Tsygankov; Sergey Kapustin; Aleksandr Maltsev; Boris Aleksandrov; Boris Mikhailov; Alexander Yakushev; Vladimir Petrov; Valeri Kharlamov; Vladimir Shadrin; Valeri Vasiliev; Viktor Shalimov; Viktor Zhluktov	Czechoslovakia Jiří Holík; Oldřich Machač; František Pospíšil; Jiří Holeček; Bohuslav Šťastný; Ivan Hlinka; Vladimír Martinec; Eduard Novák; Josef Augusta; Jiří Bubla; Milan Chalupa; Jiří Crha; Miroslav Dvořák; Bohuslav Ebermann; Milan Kajkl; Jiří Novák; Milan Nový; Jaroslav Pouzar; Pavol Svitana	West Germany Lorenz Funk; Ernst Köpf; Alois Schloder; Rudolf Thanner; Josef Völk; Anton Kehle; Erich Kühnhackl; Rainer Philipp; Klaus Auhuber; Ignaz Berndaner; Wolfgang Boos; Martin Hinterstocker; Udo Kiessling; Walter Köberle; Stefan Metz; Franz Reindl; Ferenc Vozar; Erich Weishaupt

== First round ==
In the first round teams were seeded according to their placement in the 1975 World Championships. Winners of this round qualified for Group A to play for 1st–6th places, while the losers competed in Group B for 7th–12th places. Qualifiers from East Germany and Sweden chose not to play. 1975 ranking appears in parentheses.

- February 2
  - Poland (5th) 7–4 Romania (11th)
  - Czechoslovakia (2nd) 14–1 Bulgaria (16th)
  - West Germany (8th) 5–1 Switzerland (9th)
- February 3
  - USSR (1st) 16–3 Austria (17th)
  - Finland (4th) 11–2 Japan (12th)
  - USA (6th) 8–4 Yugoslavia (10th)

== Final round ==
First place team wins gold, second silver and third bronze.

Pos	Team	Pld	W	L	D	GF	GA	GD	Pts
1	Soviet Union	5	5	0	0	40	11	+29	10
2	Czechoslovakia	5	3	2	0	17	10	+7	6
3	West Germany	5	2	3	0	21	24	−3	4
4	Finland	5	2	3	0	19	18	+1	4
5	United States	5	2	3	0	15	21	−6	4
6	Poland (Note: The score after the Czechoslovakia vs Poland match was 7–1, but due to the positive doping test of one of the Czechoslovak players, the team was recorded a 0–1 loss. Poland didn't receive any points.)	5	1	4	0	9	37	−28	0

Source: HockeyCanada.ca
- February 6
  - Czechoslovakia 2–1 Finland
  - West Germany 7–4 Poland
  - USSR 6–2 USA
- February 8
  - Finland 5–3 West Germany
  - USSR 16–1 Poland
  - Czechoslovakia 5–0 USA
- February 10
  - USSR 7–3 West Germany
  - Poland 1–0 Czechoslovakia
  - USA 5–4 Finland
- February 12
  - Czechoslovakia 7–4 West Germany
  - USA 7–2 Poland
  - USSR 7–2 Finland
- February 14
  - USSR 4–3 Czechoslovakia
  - Finland 7–1 Poland
  - West Germany 4–1 USA

== Consolation round ==
Teams that lost their games in the qualification round played in this group.

Pos	Team	Pld	W	L	D	GF	GA	GD	Pts
7	Romania	5	4	1	0	23	15	+8	8
8	Austria	5	3	2	0	18	14	+4	6
9	Japan	5	3	2	0	20	18	+2	6
10	Yugoslavia	5	3	2	0	22	19	+3	6
11	Switzerland	5	2	3	0	24	22	+2	4
12	Bulgaria	5	0	5	0	19	38	−19	0

Source: HockeyCanada.ca
- February 5
  - Yugoslavia 6–4 Switzerland
  - Romania 3–1 Japan
  - Austria 6–2 Bulgaria
- February 7
  - Yugoslavia 4–3 Romania
  - Switzerland 8–3 Bulgaria
  - Austria 3–2 Japan
- February 9
  - Yugoslavia 8–5 Bulgaria
  - Austria 3–4 Romania
  - Japan 6–4 Switzerland
- February 11
  - Romania 9–4 Bulgaria
  - Austria 3–5 Switzerland
  - Japan 4–3 Yugoslavia
- February 13
  - Romania 4–3 Switzerland
  - Japan 7–5 Bulgaria
  - Austria 3–1 Yugoslavia

== Statistics ==
=== Average age ===
Team Bulgaria was the oldest team in the tournament, averaging 27 years and 9 months. Team USA was the youngest team in the tournament, averaging 22 years and 4 months. Gold medalists Team USSR averaged 26 years and 4 months. Tournament average was 25 years and 7 months.

=== Leading scorers ===
Rk	Player	GP	G	A	Pts
1	(Soviet Union) Vladimir Shadrin	6	10	4	14
T2	(Soviet Union) Alexander Maltsev	6	7	7	14
T2	(Soviet Union) Viktor Shalimov	6	7	7	14
4	(Soviet Union) Alexander Yakushev	6	4	9	13
5	(Germany) Erich Kühnhackl	6	6	5	11
6	(Soviet Union) Vladimir Petrov	6	6	3	9
T7	(Germany) Lorenz Funk	6	4	5	9
T7	(Germany) Ernst Köpf	6	4	5	9
9	(Soviet Union) Valeri Kharlamov	5	3	6	9
10	(United States) Bob Dobek	6	3	5	8

== Final ranking ==
1. Soviet Union
2. Czechoslovakia
3. West Germany
4. Finland
5. United States
6. Poland
7. Romania
8. Austria
9. Japan
10. Yugoslavia
11. Switzerland
12. Bulgaria
