= Andreas Niederberger =

German ice hockey player

Personal information
- Nationality: German
- Born: 20 April 1963 (age 61); Munich, West Germany

Sport
- Sport: Ice hockey

Andreas Niederberger (born 20 April 1963) is a German ice hockey player. He competed in the men's tournaments at the 1984, 1988, 1992 and the 1994 Winter Olympics.
