= Walter Köberle =

German ice hockey player

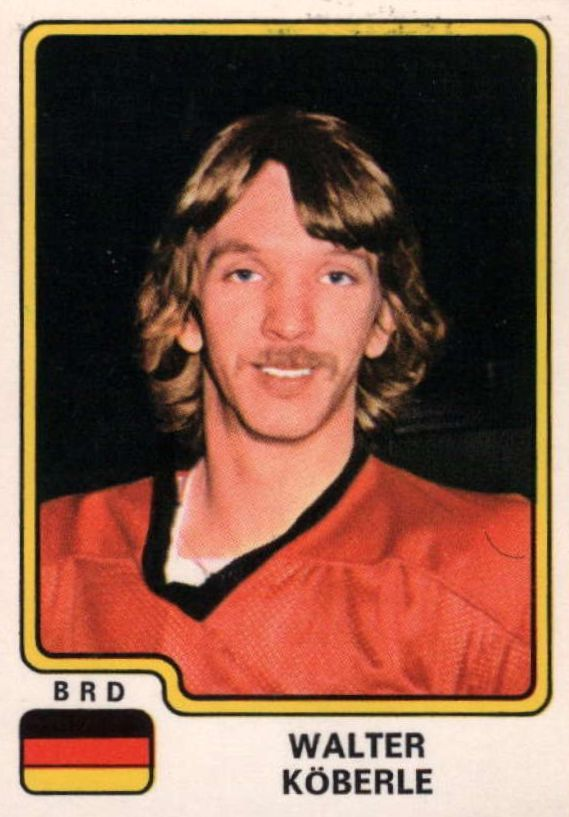

Personal information
- Born: 13 January 1949 (age 77) Kaufbeuren, Germany
Medal record
Men's ice hockey
Representing West Germany
Olympic Games
Bronze medal – third place	1976 Innsbruck	Team

Walter Köberle (born 13 January 1949 in Kaufbeuren) is an ice hockey player who played for the West German national team. He won a bronze medal at the 1976 Winter Olympics.
