= Urban Hettich =

German Nordic combined skier

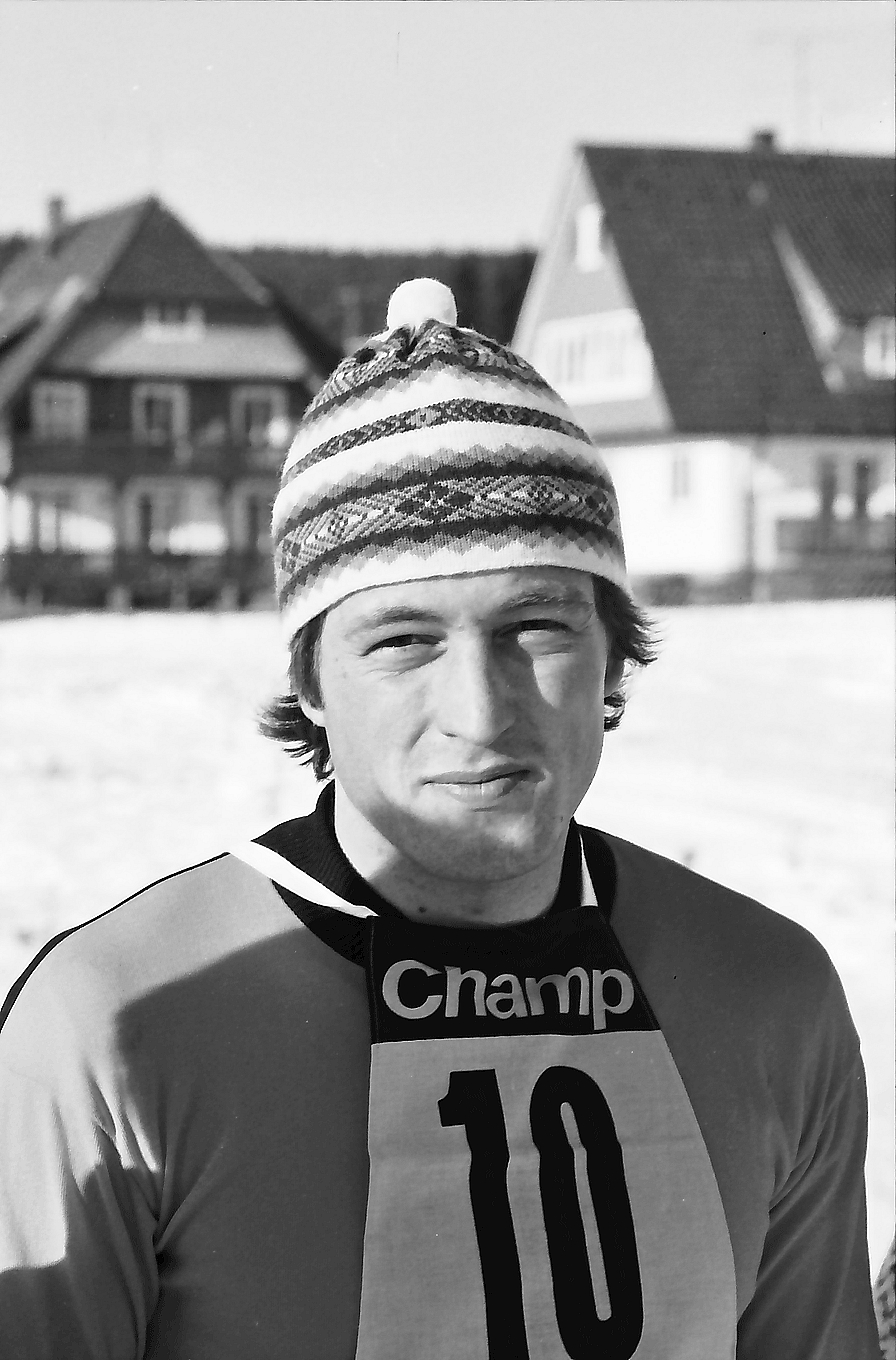

Medal record

Men's Nordic combined

Representing West Germany

Olympic Games
Silver medal – second place	1976 Innsbruck	Individual

Urban Hettich (born 2 March 1953 in Schonach im Schwarzwald) is a West German Nordic combined competitor and cross-country skier who was active during the 1970s. His best-known finish was a silver at the 1976 Winter Olympics in Innsbruck in the Individual event.

Hettich also finished seventh in the men's 4 x 10 km relay at the 1972 Winter Olympics in Sapporo.
