= Rainer Philipp =

German ice hockey player

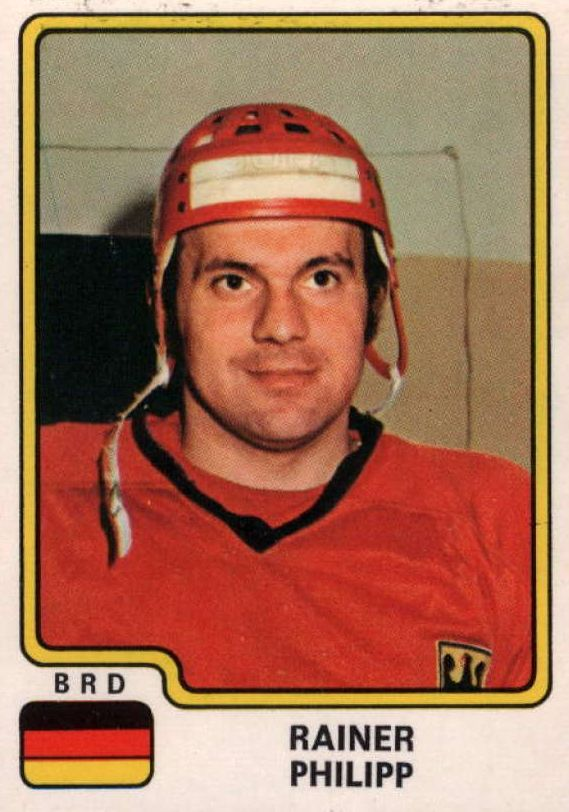

Personal information
- Born: 8 March 1950 (age 76) Bad Nauheim, West Germany
Medal record
Men's ice hockey
Representing West Germany
Olympic Games
Bronze medal – third place	1976 Innsbruck	Team

Rainer Philipp (born 8 March 1950 in Bad Nauheim) is an ice hockey player who played for the West German national team. He won a bronze medal at the 1976 Winter Olympics.
