= Martin Hinterstocker (ice hockey, born 1954) =

German ice hockey player

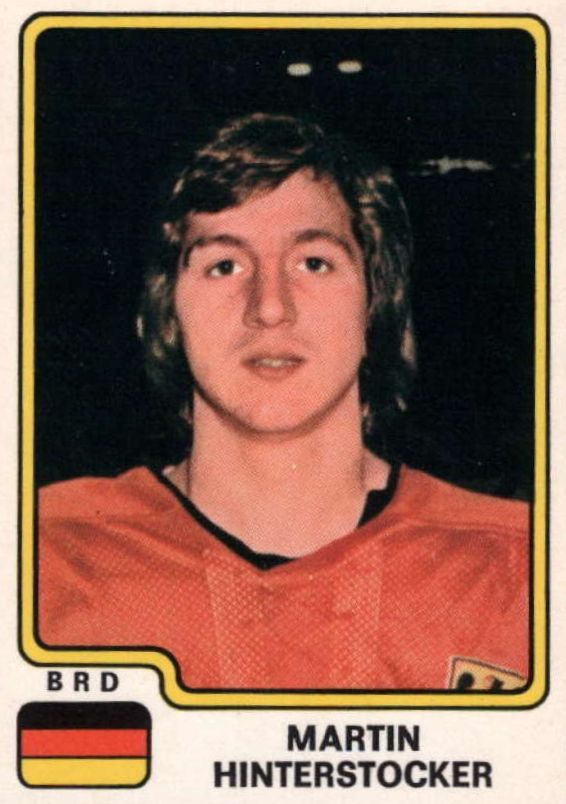
- Born: 28 July 1954 (age 72) Holzkirchen
- Height: 5 ft 7 in (170 cm)
- Weight: 165 lb (75 kg; 11 st 11 lb)
- Position: Forward
- Played for: Düsseldorfer EG; ECD Iserlohn; SC Riessersee; ESV Kaufbeuren
- National team: West Germany
- Playing career: 1971–1990
Medal record
Men's ice hockey
Representing West Germany
Olympic Games
Bronze medal – third place	1976 Innsbruck	Team

Martin Hinterstocker Sr. (born 28 July 1954 in Holzkirchen) is an ice hockey player who played for the West German national team. He won a bronze medal at the 1976 Winter Olympics.
