= Erich Weishaupt =

German ice hockey player

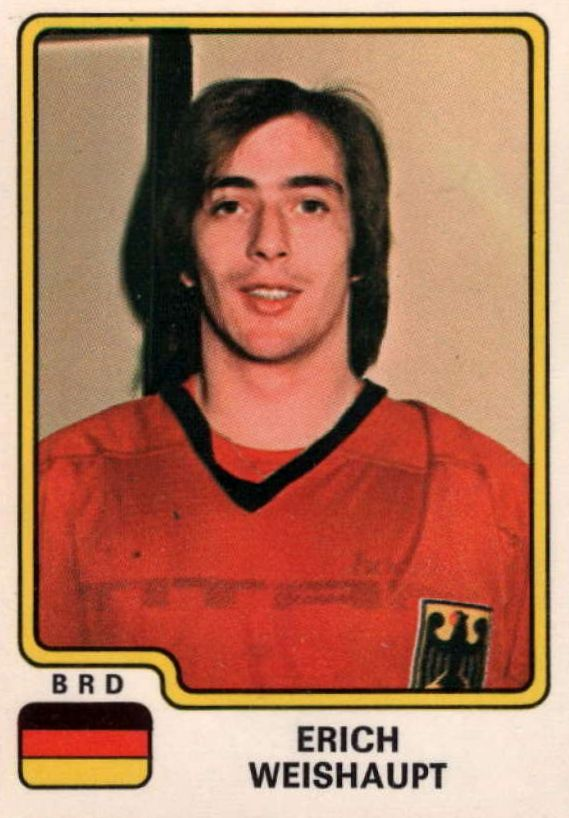

Personal information
- Born: 16 May 1952 (age 74) Kaufbeuren, West Germany
Medal record
Men's ice hockey
Representing West Germany
Olympic Games
Bronze medal – third place	1976 Innsbruck	Team

Erich Weishaupt (born 16 May 1952 in Kaufbeuren) is a retired ice hockey player who played for the West German national team and won a bronze medal at the 1976 Winter Olympics.
