= Günther Abel =

German Nordic combined skier (born 1956)

Personal information
- Nationality: German
- Born: 22 November 1956 (age 69) Winterberg, West Germany
- Height: 1.83 m (6 ft 0 in)
- Weight: 80 kg (180 lb)

Sport
- Sport: Nordic combined
- Club: SK Winterberg

Günther Abel (born 22 November 1956) is a German Nordic combined skier. He competed in the 1976 and 1980 Winter Olympics.
