= Peter Obresa =

German ice hockey player

Personal information
- Nationality: German
- Born: 6 August 1960 (age 64); Mannheim, West Germany

Sport
- Sport: Ice hockey

Peter Obresa (born 6 August 1960) is a German ice hockey player. He competed in the men's tournament at the 1988 Winter Olympics.
