= Stefan Metz =

German ice hockey player

Personal information
- Born: 15 October 1951 (age 74) Kaufbeuren, West Germany
Medal record
Men's ice hockey
Representing West Germany
Olympic Games
Bronze medal – third place	1976 Innsbruck	Team

Stefan Metz (born 15 October 1951 in Kaufbeuren) is an ice hockey player who played for the West German national team. He won a bronze medal at the 1976 Winter Olympics.
