= Wolfgang Boos =

German ice hockey player (born 1946)

Personal information
- Born: 13 January 1946 (age 80) Füssen, Germany
Medal record
Men's ice hockey
Representing West Germany
Olympic Games
Bronze medal – third place	1976 Innsbruck	Team

Wolfgang Boos (born 13 January 1946 in Füssen) is an ice hockey player who played for the West German national team. He won a bronze medal at the 1976 Winter Olympics. He is the father of Tino Boos.
