= Josef Völk =

German ice hockey player

Personal information
- Born: December 3, 1948 (age 77) Emmenhausen, Lower Saxony, Germany
Medal record
Men's ice hockey
Representing West Germany
Olympic Games
Bronze medal – third place	1976 Innsbruck	Team

Josef Völk (born 3 December 1948 in Emmenhausen, Lower Saxony, Germany) is an ice hockey player who played for the West German national team. He won a bronze medal at the 1976 Winter Olympics.
