= Rudolf Thanner =

German ice hockey player

Personal information
- Born: August 20, 1944 Füssen, Nazi Germany
- Died: August 9, 2007 (aged 62) Füssen, Germany
Medal record
Men's ice hockey
Representing West Germany
Olympic Games
Bronze medal – third place	1976 Innsbruck	Team

Rudolf "Rudi" Thanner (20 August 1944 – 9 August 2007) was an ice hockey player who played for the West German national team. He won a bronze medal at the 1976 Winter Olympics.

Thanner served on the municipal council of Füssen from 1984 to 1990 and from 1996 to 2002.
