= Ferenc Vozar =

German ice hockey player

Personal information
- Born: 19 April 1945 Budapest, Hungary
- Died: 15 February 1999 (aged 53) Denzlingen
Medal record
Men's ice hockey
Representing West Germany
Olympic Games
Bronze medal – third place	1976 Innsbruck	Team

Ferenc Vozar (19 April 1945 in Budapest - 15 February 1999 in Denzlingen) was a Hungarian-born ice hockey player who played for the West German national team. He won a bronze medal at the 1976 Winter Olympics.
