= Klaus Auhuber =

German ice hockey player

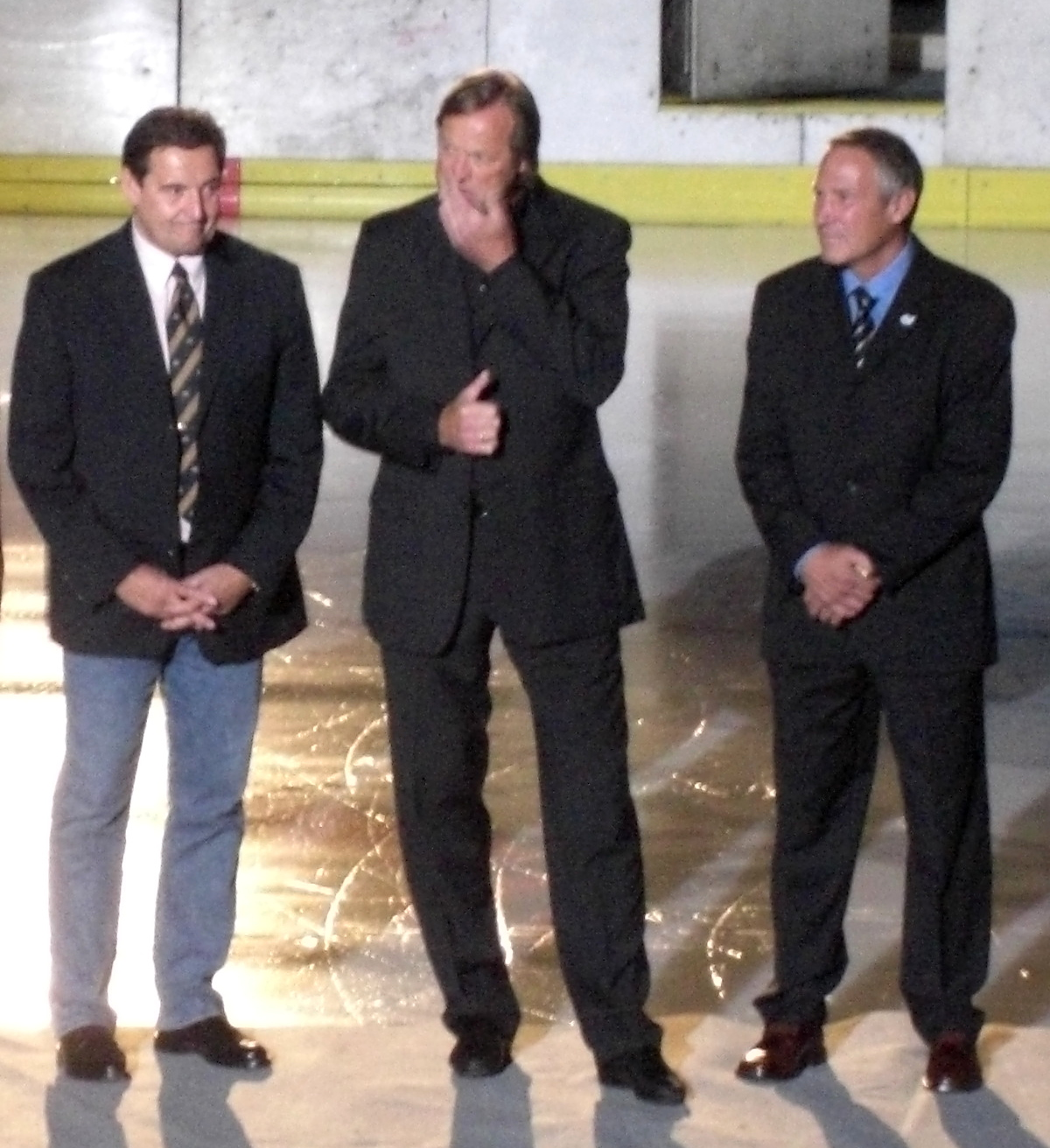
- Klaus Auhuber (left) with Erich Kühnhackl (middle) and Alois Schloder (right) in 2010

Personal information
- Born: 18 October 1951 (age 74) Landshut, West Germany
Medal record
Men's ice hockey
Representing West Germany
Olympic Games
Bronze medal – third place	1976 Innsbruck	Team

Klaus Auhuber (born 18 October 1951 in Landshut) is an ice hockey player who played for the West German national team. He won a bronze medal at the 1976 Winter Olympics.
