= Lorenz Funk =

German ice hockey player (1947–2017)

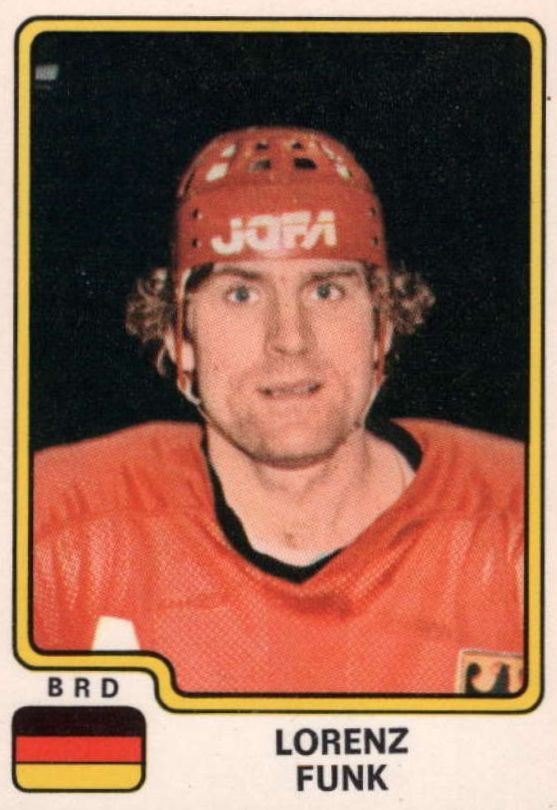

Personal information
- Born: 17 March 1947 Bad Tölz, Germany
- Died: 29 September 2017 (aged 70) Greiling, Germany
Medal record
Men's ice hockey
Representing West Germany
Olympic Games
Bronze medal – third place	1976 Innsbruck	Team

Lorenz Funk Sr. (17 March 1947 in Bad Tölz – 29 September 2017 in Greiling) was an ice hockey player who played for the West German national team. He won a bronze medal at the 1976 Winter Olympics.

He came back from retirement to play with his sons Florian and Lorenz Jr.

== Career ==
As a player Funk played with two teams in both Oberliga and Berlin-Liga leagues:

- EC Bad Tölz 1965–1972, 1989–1990
- BSC Preussen 1972–1981, 1983–1986, 1988, 2003
- Riessersee SC 1982–1983

As head coach he coached both his old teams and two other German professional teams:

- BSC Preussen 1983–1984, 1986–1987
- EC Bad Tölz 1988–1990
- SV Bayreuth 1900–1991 (Eishockey-Bundesliga league)
- Eisbären Berlin 1991–2000

He was manager, director and eventually president of the Berlin Capitals.

== Awards ==
- 1990 Bundesverdienstkreuz (Federal Cross of Merit).
