= Alois Schloder =

German ice hockey player

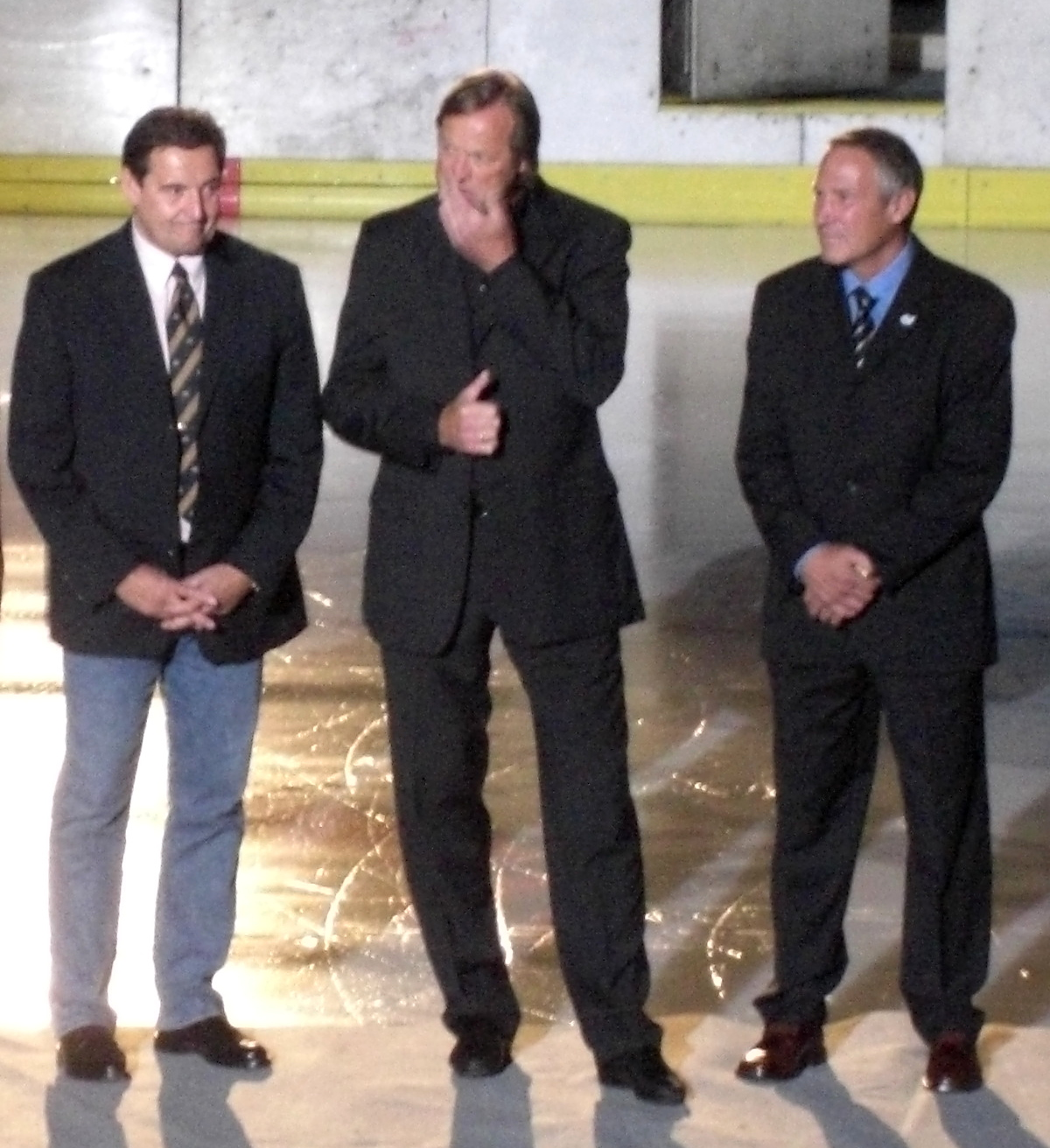
- Alois Schloder (right) with Klaus Auhuber (left) and Erich Kühnhackl (middle) in 2010

Personal information
- Born: August 11, 1947 (age 78) Landshut, Germany
Medal record
Men's ice hockey
Representing West Germany
Olympic Games
| Bronze medal – third place | 1976 Innsbruck | Team |

Alois Schloder (born 11 August 1947 in Landshut, Germany) is a retired ice hockey player. He participated at the 1976 Winter Olympics and won a bronze medal. He was disqualified from the 1972 Winter Olympics after failing a doping test. After his innocence was proven a few weeks later, he was allowed to take part in the 1972 Ice Hockey World Championships.

He was inducted into the International Ice Hockey Federation Hall of Fame in 2005.
