= Ernst Köpf =

German ice hockey player

- Born: February 10, 1940 (age 86) Füssen, Nazi Germany
- National team: West Germany
Medal record
Men's ice hockey
Representing West Germany
Olympic Games
Bronze medal – third place	1976 Innsbruck	Team

Ernst Köpf Sr. (born 10 February 1940 in Füssen, Nazi Germany) is an ice hockey player who played for the West German national team. He won a bronze medal at the 1976 Winter Olympics.

His son Ernst Köpf Jr. competed in ice hockey at the 1992 Winter Olympics.
