= Ignaz Berndaner =

German ice hockey player (born 1954)

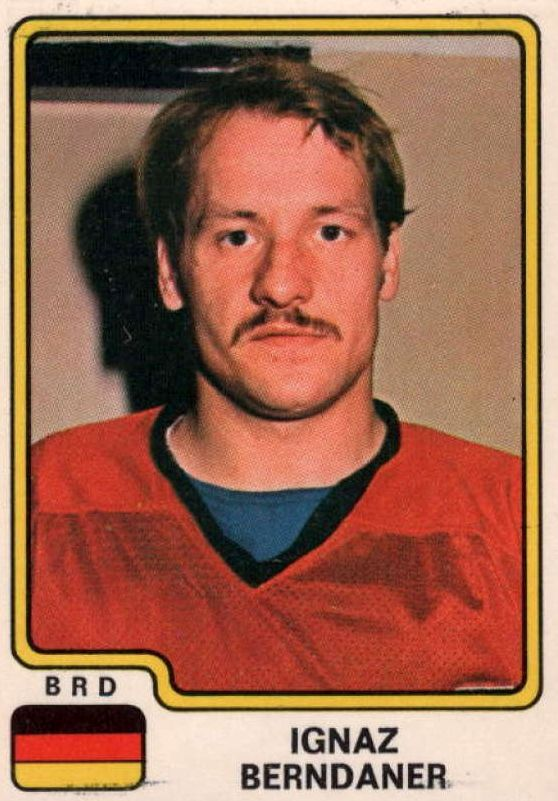

Personal information
- Born: 4 July 1954 (age 71) Garmisch-Partenkirchen, West Germany
Medal record
Men's ice hockey
Representing West Germany
Olympic Games
Bronze medal – third place	1976 Innsbruck	Team

Ignaz Berndaner (born 4 July 1954, in Garmisch-Partenkirchen) is an ice hockey player who played for the West German national team. He won a bronze medal at the 1976 Winter Olympics. He also represented West Germany at the 1984 Canada Cup.
