= Anton Kehle =

German ice hockey player

Personal information
- Born: 8 November 1947 Füssen, Germany
- Died: 24 September 1997 (aged 49) Füssen, Germany
Medal record
Men's ice hockey
Representing West Germany
Olympic Games
Bronze medal – third place	1976 Innsbruck	Team

Anton "Toni" Kehle (8 November 1947 in Füssen – 24 September 1997) was a German ice hockey goaltender who played for the West German national team. He won a bronze medal at the 1976 Winter Olympics.
