= Franz Reindl =

German ice hockey player (born 1954)

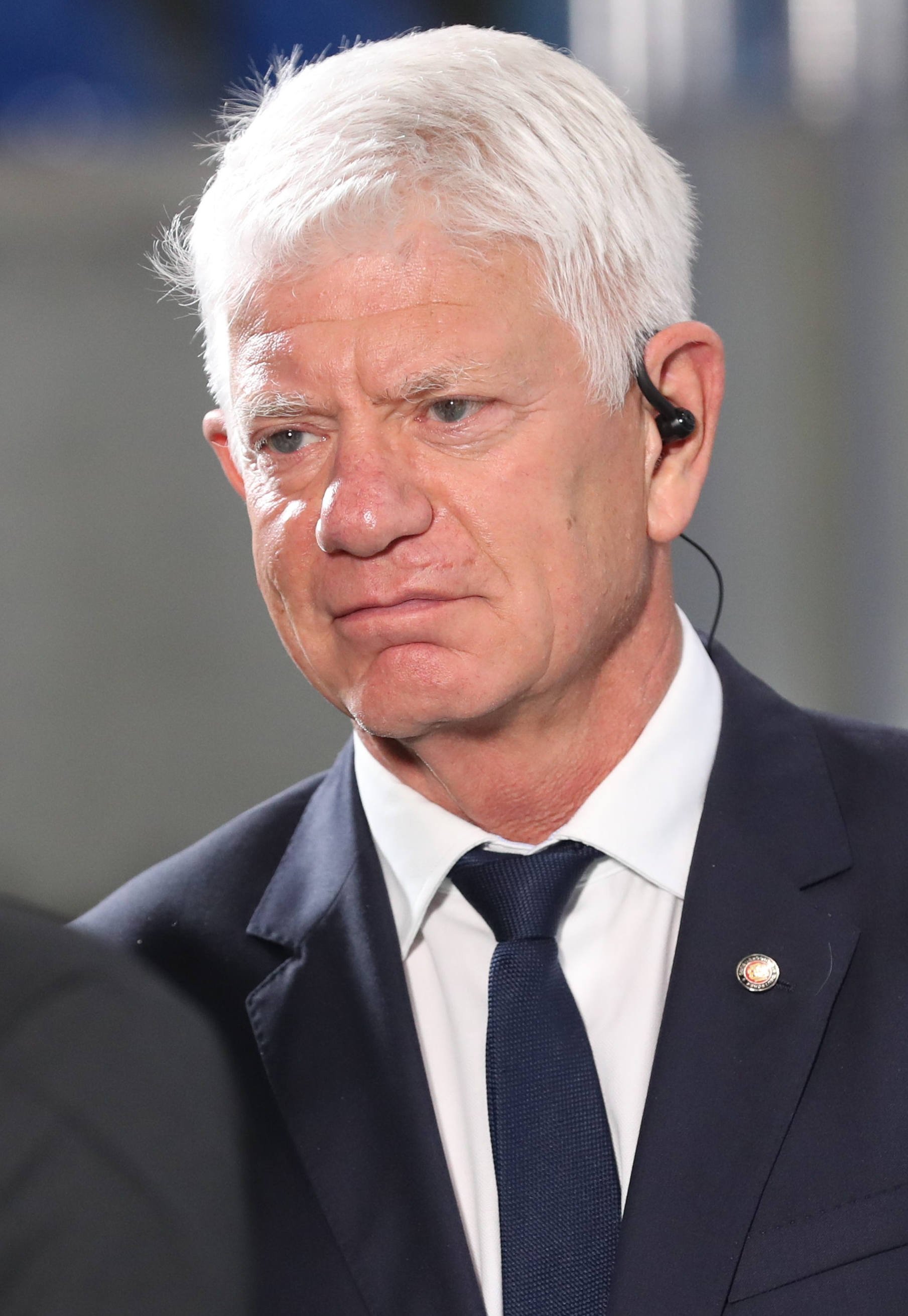
- Born: 24 November 1954 (age 71) Garmisch-Partenkirchen, West Germany
- Height: 5 ft 10 in (178 cm)
- Weight: 172 lb (78 kg; 12 st 4 lb)
- Position: Left wing
- Played for: SC Riessersee; Star Bulls Rosenheim
- National team: West Germany
- Playing career: 1972–1988
Medal record
Men's ice hockey
Representing West Germany
Olympic Games
| Bronze medal – third place | 1976 Innsbruck | Team |

Franz Reindl (born 24 November 1954) is a German former professional ice hockey player and current executive, who served as the president of the German Ice Hockey Federation from 2014 to 2022. He was born in Garmisch-Partenkirchen, West Germany. Since 2 October 2026, he has been the president of the International Ice Hockey Federation (IIHF), elected for a term lasting until 2030. He succeeded Luc Tardif in leading the IIHF.

Reindl played 12 seasons for SC Riessersee. His best offensive season was 1981-82 when he scored 102 points in 43 games. He finished his career playing four seasons with Star Bulls Rosenheim.

Reindl won a bronze medal at the 1976 Winter Olympics playing for West Germany. He also played at the 1984 Canada Cup.

He was head coach of Germany at the 2004 World Cup of Hockey.

| Preceded by Luc Tardif | President of the IIHF; 2026–present | Incumbent |
