= Kaufbeuren =

- Town
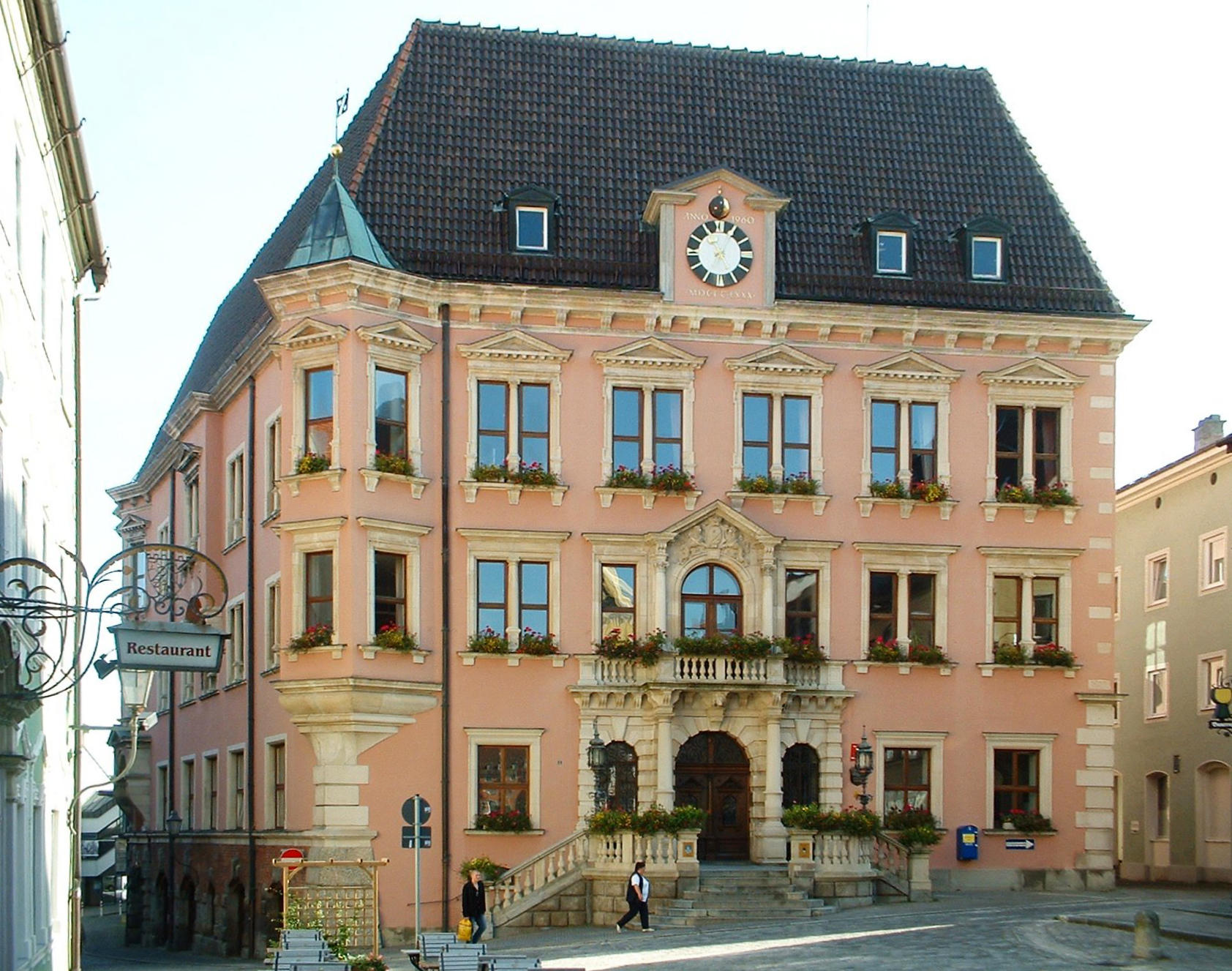
- Town hall

- Flag Coat of arms
- Interactive map of Kaufbeuren
- Location within Germany Location within Bavaria
- Coordinates: 47°52′48″N 10°37′21″E
- Country: Germany
- State: Bavaria
- Admin. region: Swabia
- District: Urban district
- Subdivisions: 5 districts

Government
  - Mayor (2020–26): Stefan Bosse (CSU)

Area
  - Total: 40.02 km^{2} (15.45 sq mi)
- Elevation: 681–860 m (2,234–2,822 ft)

Population (2025-12-31)
  - Total: 46,282
  - Density: 1,156/km^{2} (2,995/sq mi)
- Time zone: UTC+01:00 (CET)
  - Summer (DST): UTC+02:00 (CEST)
- Postal codes: 87571–87600
- Dialling codes: 08341
- Vehicle registration: KF
- Website: www.kaufbeuren.de

Kaufbeuren (German pronunciation: [kaʊfˈbɔʏʁən]; Bavarian: Kaufbeiren) is an independent town in the Regierungsbezirk of Swabia, Bavaria. The town is an enclave within the district of Ostallgäu.

== Districts ==
Kaufbeuren consists of nine districts:

- Kaufbeuren (town core incl. historical town)
- Kaufbeuren-Neugablonz (built for displaced Germans after WWII)
- Oberbeuren
- Hirschzell
- Kleinkemnat
- Großkemnat
- Märzisried
- Ölmühlhang
- Sankt Cosmas

== Mayors ==
Stefan Bosse (CSU) is the Lord Mayor of Kaufbeuren since November 2004. He was reelected in March 2014 with 57.48% of the votes and again in March 2020 with 54.5% of the votes.

== Landmarks ==
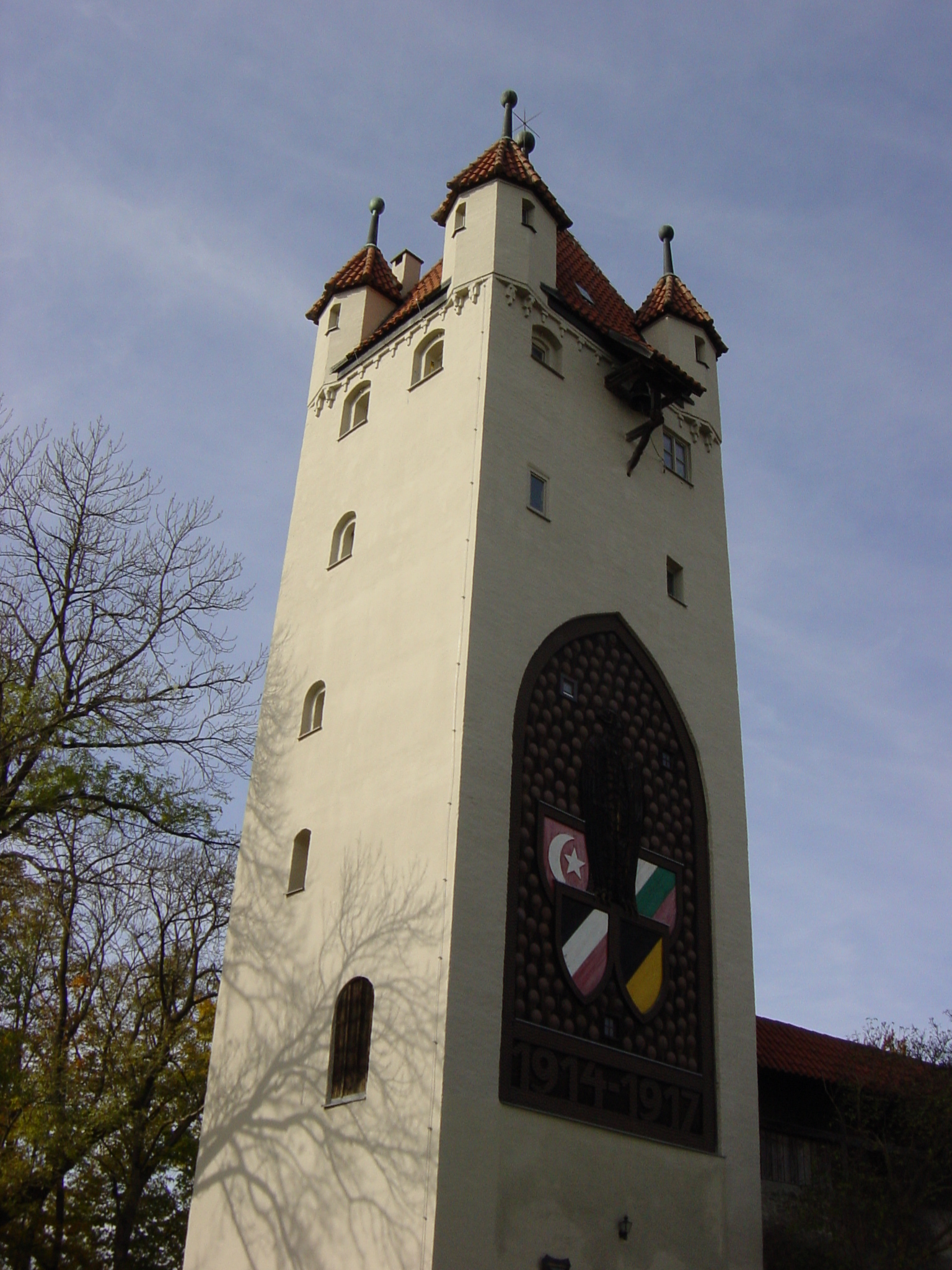
Fünfknopfturm

- Town hall (built 1879–1881)
- Crescentiakloster (founded 1150)
- Historical town with partially conserved historical town wall
- St.-Martins-Kirche
- Fünfknopfturm (Five-Button-Tower)
- St.-Blasius-Kirche
- Hexenturm
- Gerberturm
- Pulverturm
- Münzturm
- Sywollenturm
- Zollhäuschen
- Stadttheater Kaufbeuren
- Kunsthaus Kaufbeuren

=== Museums ===
- Stadtmuseum
- Feuerwehrmuseum
- Puppentheater-Museum
- Isergebirgs-Museum (Neugablonz)

== Notable people ==
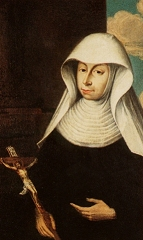
Maria Crescentia Höss

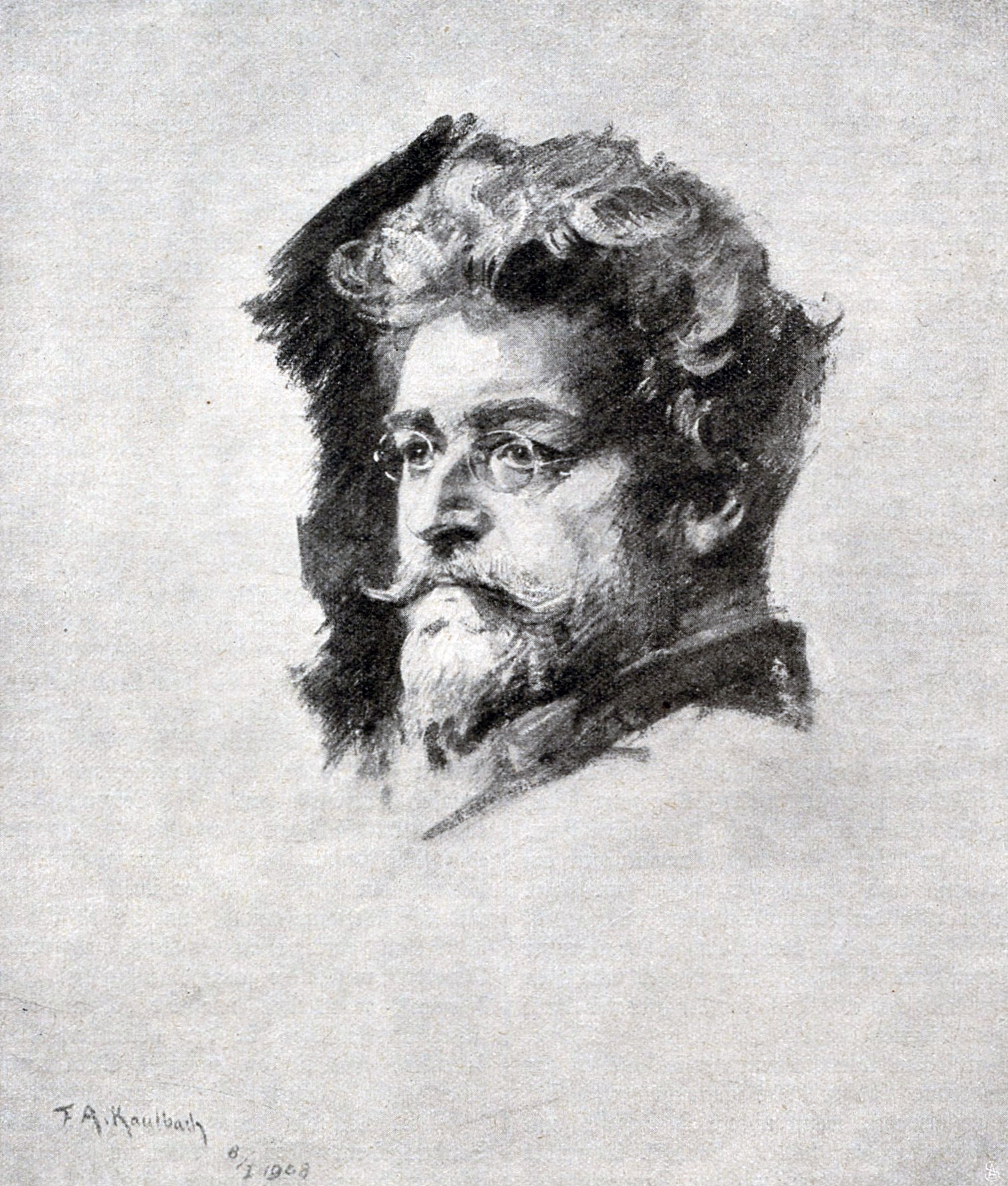
Ludwig Ganghofer 1908 painted by Friedrich August von Kaulbach

- Maria Crescentia Höss (1682–1744), nun, beatified 1900, canonised 2001
- Sophie von La Roche (1730–1807), writer
- Ludwig Ganghofer (1855–1920), writer
- Rudolf Roessler (1897–1958), publisher and spy
- Wilhelm Walcher (1910–2005), physicist
- Hans Liebherr (1915–1993), master mason, inventor of the mobile tower crane and founder of the Liebherr
- Hans Magnus Enzensberger (1929-2022), poet, writer and publisher
- Walter Riester (born 1943), politician (SPD), Secretary of State for Employment 1998–2002
- Erich Weishaupt (born 1952), ice hockey player
- Dieter Hegen (born 1962), ice hockey player
- Alexander Sulzer (born 1984), ice hockey player

== Kaufbeuren Air Base ==
The Kaufbeuren Air Base was established as a Luftwaffe station in 1935. When seized by the United States Army in May 1945 at the end of World War II, it was discovered to be the final location of Nazi Party's top secret FA signals intelligence and cryptanalytic agency. After serving as a U.S. airbase during the post-war period, the field was ultimately returned to the town on 16 December 1957, and today serves as a German Air Force training field.

== Culture ==
The Tänzelfest is a festival, which takes place usually at the end of June. Children reenact the history of the town in traditional costume.

== Sports ==
The town is known for their ice hockey team ESV Kaufbeuren. They currently play in DEL2, the second level of ice hockey in Germany. Kaufbeuren is also known for its soccer team which plays in the Bezirksliga South.

== Twin towns – sister cities ==
Kaufbeuren is twinned with:

- Ferrara, Italy (1991)
- Szombathely, Hungary (1992)
- Jablonec nad Nisou, Czech Republic (2009)
