= Krutov =

Krutov (Russian: Крутов) is a Russian male surname, its feminine counterpart is Krutova. Notable people with the surname include:

- Alexander Krutov (born 1947), Russian journalist and politician
- Alexei Krutov (born 1984), Russian ice hockey winger
- Igor Krutov (born 1995), Russian football midfielder
- Sergei Krutov (born 1969), Russian football player
- Vladimir Krutov (1960–2012), nicknamed "The Tank", Russian ice hockey player
- Ninel Krutova (born 1926), Russian diver
