= Igor Larionov =

Russian ice hockey player (born 1960)

- Hockey Hall of Fame, 2008
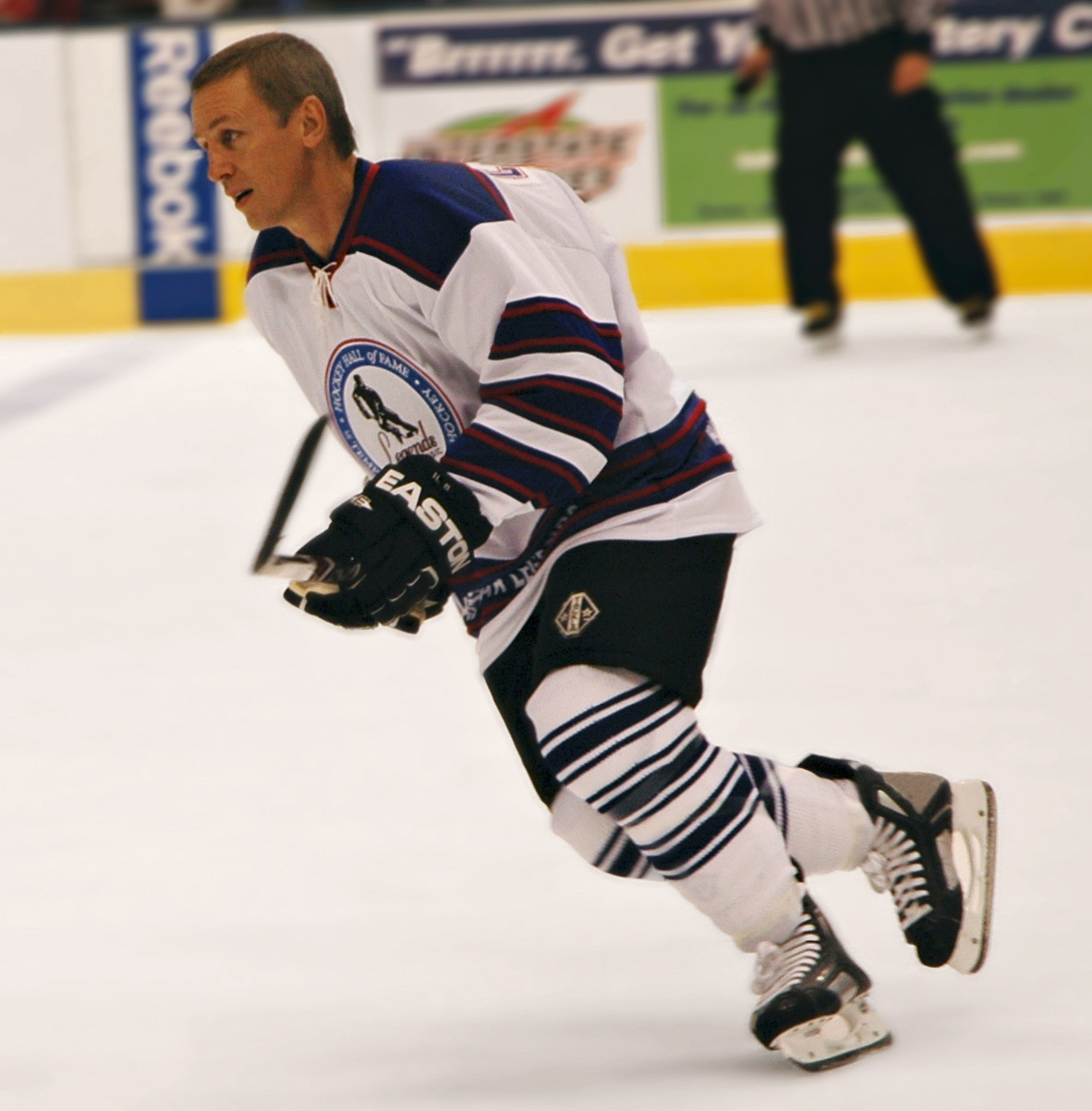
- Larionov in 2008
- Born: 3 December 1960 (age 65) Voskresensk, Russian SFSR, Soviet Union
- Height: 5 ft 9 in (175 cm)
- Weight: 170 lb (77 kg; 12 st 2 lb)
- Position: Center
- Shot: Left
- Played for: Khimik Voskresensk; CSKA Moscow; Vancouver Canucks; Lugano; San Jose Sharks; Detroit Red Wings; Florida Panthers; New Jersey Devils
- Current KHL coach: SKA Saint Petersburg
- National team: Soviet Union and Russia
- NHL draft: 214th overall, 1985; Vancouver Canucks
- Playing career: 1977–2006

Igor Nikolayevich Larionov (Russian: Игорь Николаевич Ларионов; born 3 December 1960) is a Russian ice hockey coach, sports agent and former professional ice hockey player, known as "the Professor". Considered one of the best hockey players of all time, he, along with Viacheslav Fetisov, were instrumental in forcing the Soviet government to let Soviet players compete in the National Hockey League (NHL). During his career, which lasted from 1977 to 2006, he primarily played the centre position.

Larionov won the Stanley Cup three times with the Detroit Red Wings (1997, 1998, 2002) and was inducted as a member of the Hockey Hall of Fame on 10 November 2008. He was also a member of Detroit's famed Russian Five line. His international career was recognized with induction into the IIHF Hall of Fame in 2008.

== Playing career ==
=== Soviet League (1977–1989) ===
Larionov began his career in the Soviet League with Khimik Voskresensk in 1977–78, appearing in six games. Joining the club full-time the following season, he recorded seven points in 32 games as a rookie. He improved to 45 points in 43 games in 1980–81, garnering the attention of CSKA Moscow and Soviet national team coach Viktor Tikhonov. Tikhonov approached him before a game between CSKA and Khimik early in the 1980–81 season, inviting Larionov to play for him. He notched five assists that game against Tikhonov's team and the following season, joined CSKA Moscow as the top-line centre between Vladimir Krutov and Sergei Makarov. The trio became known as the "KLM Line" and dominated both the Soviet League and international competition. They were joined by defensive pairing Viacheslav Fetisov and Alexei Kasatonov to form the five-man lineup known as the "Green Unit", so called for the green uniforms they wore during practice.

Larionov put up 53 points in his first season with CSKA, including a Soviet career-high 31 goals. He was named the Soviet MVP in 1988 following a personal best 32 assists and 57 points. Despite the success, Larionov resisted Tikhonov's draconian coaching style and the Soviet system that had a tight grip on the players' personal lives. He objected that Tikhonov kept his players confined to barracks (in CSKA's Archangel training facility) for as much as 11 months a year, even when they were married (CSKA was a functioning division of the Soviet Army). He told a Russian magazine that with the players being away from home for so long, "it is a wonder our wives manage to give birth." Larionov also recounted suspicious injections that national team players would receive annually leading up to the World Championships. According to Larionov, he refused an injection prior to the 1982 World Championships and was not asked again.

Larionov led the revolt with Fetisov against Soviet authorities that prevented Soviet players from defecting to the NHL. He had been drafted by the Vancouver Canucks in 1985 and openly expressed a desire to move to North America. After talking to reporters about one day playing in the NHL, Tikhonov told Larionov that there was a mix-up with his passport and that he could not join the team for their six-city tour of the NHL in December 1985. He was to be kept off the national squad as well until the lobbying of Fetisov and other players returned Larionov to the team.

=== National Hockey League (1989–2004) ===
After eight years of voicing his discontent, Larionov was allowed to join the Canucks in 1989–90. He left the Soviet Union around the same time as several other Soviet players, including all four of his "Green Unit" teammates. They were sold in order to infuse the cash-strapped Sovintersport (the governing body for sports in the former Soviet Union), which would draw a portion of the players' salaries. Larionov was joined in Vancouver by Krutov, and both struggled initially. While Krutov lasted only one year in the NHL, Larionov played three years for the Canucks and got progressively better as he adapted to the North American game. In the 1991–92 season, he centered the Canucks' top line, which included Greg Adams and rookie Pavel Bure. Larionov took the young Russian star under his wing that season.

After his three-year contract with the Canucks had expired, Larionov chose to play a year in Switzerland so that Sovintersport would not continue to draw a portion of his salary. Subsequently, the Canucks left him unprotected in the 1992 NHL Waiver Draft and he was claimed by the San Jose Sharks on 4 October 1992. He went to the San Jose Sharks in 1993–94, where he was re-united with Sergei Makarov and helped the Sharks to a record 59-point improvement over the previous season. The Sharks then upset the heavily favoured Detroit Red Wings in the opening round of the playoffs and extended the Toronto Maple Leafs to seven games in the Conference Semi-Finals before falling. During the 1994–95 season, Larionov served as an alternate captain for the Sharks.

During the 1995–96 season, the re-building Sharks traded Larionov along with a conditional draft pick to the Detroit Red Wings for forward sniper Ray Sheppard. Red Wings coach and general manager Scotty Bowman had specifically targeted Larionov for his all-around game, noting his ability to play both the power play and penalty kill with equal success. Larionov was one of the Red Wings' "Russian Five" in the mid-1990s. He and Fetisov were looked on as father figures by the team's other Russian players, which included Sergei Fedorov, Vyacheslav Kozlov and Vladimir Konstantinov.

Larionov was an integral part of the Red Wings' back to back Stanley Cup Championships in 1997 and 1998. That summer, Larionov and his Russian teammates made history by bringing the famed Cup home to Russia for the first time ever.

In 2000, Larionov signed with the Florida Panthers, where he was re-united with Pavel Bure. It was a disaster, though, and Larionov was traded back to Detroit before the end of the season. He helped the Red Wings to the 2002 Stanley Cup championship, and made his mark on the 2002 Stanley Cup Final by scoring the winning goal in triple overtime of game three against the Carolina Hurricanes. Detroit would win the series in five games.

He played his final NHL season for the New Jersey Devils in 2003–04, where Viacheslav Fetisov was an assistant coach. He finished his career by playing two games for the Swedish team Brunflo IK in 2005–06, producing one goal and three assists. Brunflo is the same team that his former linemate in CSKA Moscow and the Soviet Union, Vladimir Krutov, ended his career with ten years earlier.

== International play ==
Olympic medal record

Men's ice hockey

Representing Soviet Union

Olympic Games
Gold medal – first place	1984 Sarajevo	
Gold medal – first place	1988 Calgary	

World Championships
Gold medal – first place	1982 Finland	
Gold medal – first place	1983 West Germany	
Gold medal – first place	1986 Soviet Union	
Gold medal – first place	1989 Sweden	
Silver medal – second place	1987 Austria	
Bronze medal – third place	1985 Czechoslovakia	

World Junior Championships
Gold medal – first place	1979 Sweden	
Gold medal – first place	1980 Finland	

Canada Cup
Gold medal – first place	1981 Canada	

Representing Russia

Olympic Games
Bronze medal – third place	2002 Salt Lake City	

On the international stage, playing for the Soviet Union, Larionov centered Vladimir Krutov and Sergei Makarov on the famed "KLM Line". Along with defensemen Viacheslav Fetisov and Alexei Kasatonov, they formed the "Green Unit", so named because they wore green jerseys in practice. All five players also played for CSKA Moscow.

Larionov won two gold medals (1984, 1988) for the Soviet Union and one bronze medal for Russia (2002) at the Olympics. At the World Championships, Larionov won four golds (1982, 1983, 1986, 1989), one silver (1987), and one bronze (1985). He was an instrumental member of the Soviet squad that won the 1981 Canada Cup (this tournament was the coming out of the KLM Line) and played in the 1984 and 1987 events as well. He then played for Russia in the 1996 World Cup of Hockey.

Larionov, Viacheslav Fetisov, Joe Sakic, Sidney Crosby, Scott Niedermayer and Corey Perry are the only six players in the world who have won Olympics Gold, World Championship Gold, a Stanley Cup (IIHF Triple Gold Club), Canada/World Cup, and World Junior Championship Gold.

Larianov's international career was recognized with induction into the IIHF Hall of Fame in 2008.

== Post-retirement ==
In 2008, Larionov was inducted into the Hockey Hall of Fame. He was the sixth Russian-born inductee, and the fifth-ever player.

In July 2008, Larionov was named director of hockey operations for Russian powerhouse hockey club SKA Saint Petersburg. He also works as a player agent in Bloomfield Hills, Michigan.

In 2011, he was appointed to a three-year term on the Hall Of Fame's selection committee.

In 2020, Larionov was announced the head coach of the Russian junior team. He made his debut as head coach at the 2021 World Junior Ice Hockey Championships.

In 2022, Larionov was named head coach of Torpedo Nizhny Novgorod of the KHL.

In 2025, Larionov was named head coach of SKA Saint Petersburg of the KHL.

== Personal life ==
Larionov is married to former figure skater Elena Batanova and has three children. Currently, he is a professional wine merchant making wines under the labels "Hattrick" and "Triple Overtime" with wines from Australia and California. Other wine labels include "Slapshot" and "IL Triple Overtime." The name Triple Overtime Wine Company roots from Larionov's winning goal in the third overtime period of game three in the 2002 Stanley Cup Final.

== Career statistics ==
=== Regular season and playoffs ===
			Regular season					Playoffs
Season	Team	League	GP	G	A	Pts	PIM	GP	G	A	Pts	PIM
1977–78	Khimik Voskresensk	USSR	6	3	0	3	4	—	—	—	—	—
1978–79	Khimik Voskresensk	USSR	32	3	4	7	12	—	—	—	—	—
1979–80	Khimik Voskresensk	USSR	42	11	7	18	24	—	—	—	—	—
1980–81	Khimik Voskresensk	USSR	43	22	23	45	36	—	—	—	—	—
1981–82	CSKA Moscow	USSR	46	31	22	53	6	—	—	—	—	—
1982–83	CSKA Moscow	USSR	44	20	19	39	20	—	—	—	—	—
1983–84	CSKA Moscow	USSR	43	15	26	41	30	—	—	—	—	—
1984–85	CSKA Moscow	USSR	40	18	28	46	20	—	—	—	—	—
1985–86	CSKA Moscow	USSR	40	21	31	52	33	—	—	—	—	—
1986–87	CSKA Moscow	USSR	39	20	26	46	34	—	—	—	—	—
1987–88	CSKA Moscow	USSR	51	25	32	57	54	—	—	—	—	—
1988–89	CSKA Moscow	USSR	31	15	12	27	22	—	—	—	—	—
1989–90	Vancouver Canucks	NHL	74	17	27	44	20	—	—	—	—	—
1990–91	Vancouver Canucks	NHL	64	13	21	34	14	6	1	0	1	6
1991–92	Vancouver Canucks	NHL	72	21	44	65	54	13	3	7	10	4
1992–93	HC Lugano	NDA	24	10	19	29	44	8	3	15	18	0
1993–94	San Jose Sharks	NHL	60	18	38	56	40	14	5	13	18	10
1994–95	San Jose Sharks	NHL	33	4	20	24	14	11	1	8	9	2
1995–96	San Jose Sharks	NHL	4	1	1	2	0	—	—	—	—	—
1995–96	Detroit Red Wings	NHL	69	21	50	71	34	19	6	7	13	6
1996–97	Detroit Red Wings	NHL	64	12	42	54	26	20	4	8	12	8
1997–98	Detroit Red Wings	NHL	69	8	39	47	40	22	3	10	13	12
1998–99	Detroit Red Wings	NHL	75	14	49	63	48	7	0	2	2	0
1999–00	Detroit Red Wings	NHL	79	9	38	47	28	9	1	2	3	6
2000–01	Florida Panthers	NHL	26	5	6	11	10	—	—	—	—	—
2000–01	Detroit Red Wings	NHL	39	4	25	29	28	6	1	3	4	2
2001–02	Detroit Red Wings	NHL	70	11	32	43	50	18	5	6	11	4
2002–03	Detroit Red Wings	NHL	74	10	33	43	48	4	0	1	1	0
2003–04	New Jersey Devils	NHL	49	1	10	11	20	1	0	0	0	0
2005–06	Brunflo IK	SWE-3	2	1	3	4	2	—	—	—	—	—
USSR totals			457	204	230	434	295	—	—	—	—	—
NHL totals			921	169	475	644	474	150	30	67	97	60

=== International ===
Year	Team	Event	GP	G	A	Pts	PIM
1979	Soviet Union	WJC	5	2	4	6	8
1980	Soviet Union	WJC	5	3	3	6	4
1981	Soviet Union	CC	7	4	1	5	8
1982	Soviet Union	WC	10	4	6	10	2
1983	Soviet Union	WC	9	5	7	12	4
1984	Soviet Union	OLY	6	1	4	5	6
1984	Soviet Union	CC	5	1	2	3	6
1985	Soviet Union	WC	10	2	4	6	8
1986	Soviet Union	WC	10	7	1	8	4
1987	Soviet Union	WC	10	4	8	12	2
1987	Soviet Union	CC	9	1	2	3	6
1988	Soviet Union	OLY	8	4	9	13	4
1989	Soviet Union	WC	8	3	0	3	11
1996	Russia	WCH	5	0	4	4	2
2002	Russia	OLY	6	0	3	3	4
Junior totals			10	5	7	12	12
Senior totals			103	36	51	87	67

== Awards ==
- Soviet League champion – 1982, 1983, 1984, 1985, 1986, 1987, 1988, 1989
- Stanley Cup champion – 1997, 1998, 2002

Preceded by Vladimir Krutov	Soviet MVP; 1988	Succeeded by Sergei Makarov
