= Sergei Makarov (ice hockey) =

Russian ice hockey player (born 1958)

- Hockey Hall of Fame, 2016
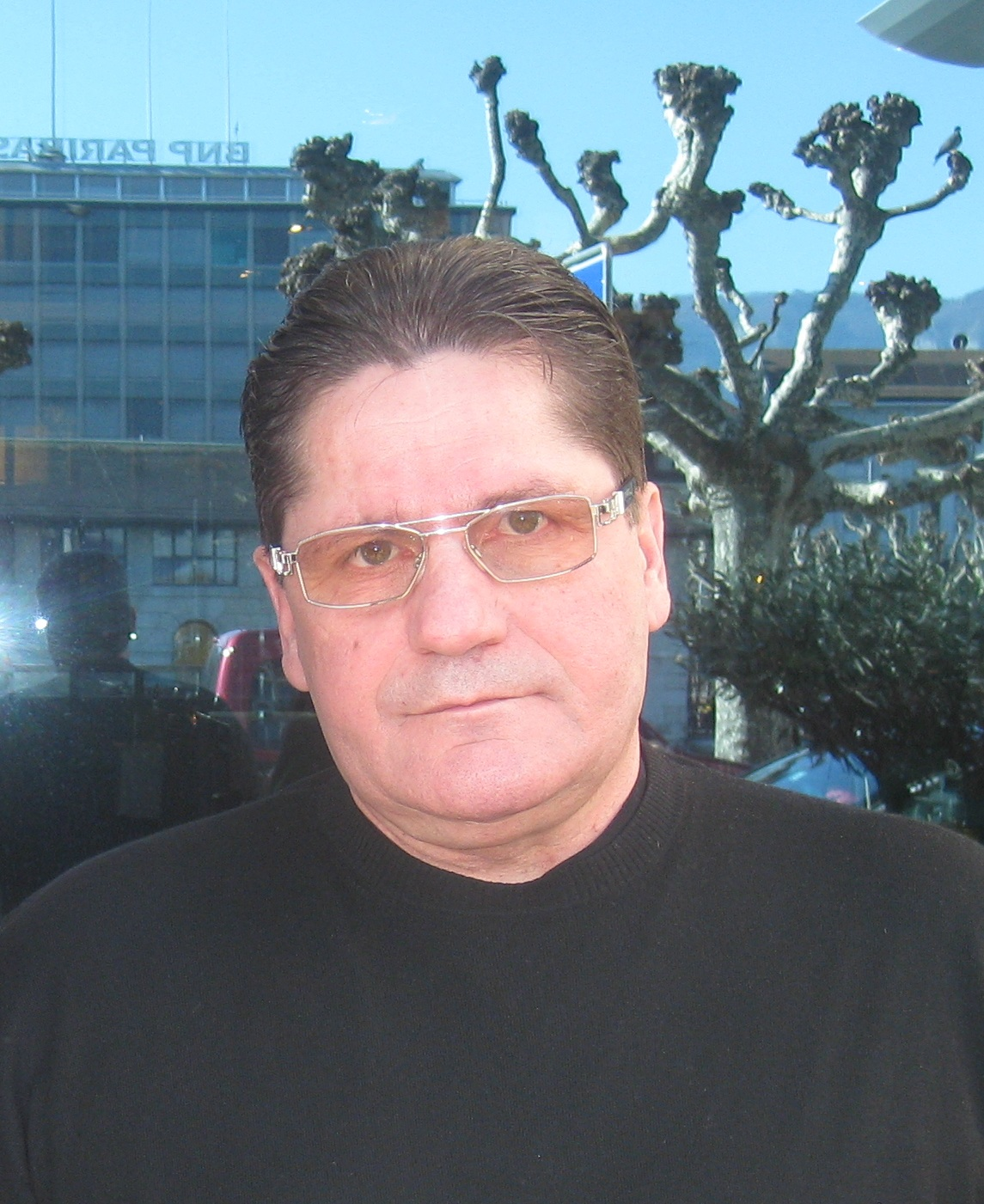
- Makarov in 2011
- Born: 19 June 1958 (age 68) Chelyabinsk, Russian SFSR, Soviet Union
- Height: 5 ft 8 in (173 cm)
- Weight: 185 lb (84 kg; 13 st 3 lb)
- Position: Right wing
- Shot: Left
- Played for: Traktor Chelyabinsk; CSKA Moscow; Calgary Flames; San Jose Sharks; Dallas Stars; HC Fribourg-Gottéron
- National team: Soviet Union
- NHL draft: 231st overall, 1983; Calgary Flames
- Playing career: 1976–1997
Medal record
Representing Soviet Union
Men's ice hockey
Olympic Games
Gold medal – first place	1984 Sarajevo	Ice hockey
Gold medal – first place	1988 Calgary	Ice hockey
Silver medal – second place	1980 Lake Placid	Ice hockey
World Championships
Gold medal – first place	1978 Czechoslovakia	Ice hockey
Gold medal – first place	1979 Soviet Union	Ice hockey
Gold medal – first place	1981 Sweden	Ice hockey
Gold medal – first place	1982 Finland	Ice hockey
Gold medal – first place	1983 West Germany	Ice hockey
Gold medal – first place	1986 Soviet Union	Ice hockey
Gold medal – first place	1989 Sweden	Ice hockey
Gold medal – first place	1990 Switzerland	Ice hockey
Silver medal – second place	1987 Austria	Ice hockey
Bronze medal – third place	1985 Czechoslovakia	Ice hockey
Bronze medal – third place	1991 Finland	Ice hockey
Challenge Cup
Gold medal – first place	1979 New York	Ice Hockey
World Junior Championships
Gold medal – first place	1977 Czechoslovakia	Ice hockey
Gold medal – first place	1978 Canada	Ice hockey

Sergei Mikhailovich Makarov (Russian: Серге́й Миха́йлович Мака́ров; born 19 June 1958) is a Russian former professional ice hockey right wing. In the Soviet Union, Makarov played 11 championship seasons with CSKA Moscow, winning the Soviet Player of the Year award (also known as Soviet MVP) three times. Together with Igor Larionov and Vladimir Krutov, they formed the KLM Line, one of the most talented and feared lines ever to play hockey. He later played in the National Hockey League (NHL) with the Calgary Flames, and won the Calder Memorial Trophy as rookie of the year at the age of 31.

Internationally, Makarov played on the gold medal-winning Soviet national team at eight World Championships, and in the 1981 Canada Cup. At the Winter Olympics, he won the gold medal in 1984 and 1988, and a silver in 1980. He was awarded Order of the Red Banner of Labour (1984).

In 2001, Makarov was inducted into the IIHF Hall of Fame. In 2016, he was inducted into the Hockey Hall of Fame. He was voted one of six players to the International Ice Hockey Federation's (IIHF) Centennial All-Star Team in a poll conducted by a group of 56 experts from 16 countries.

== Career ==
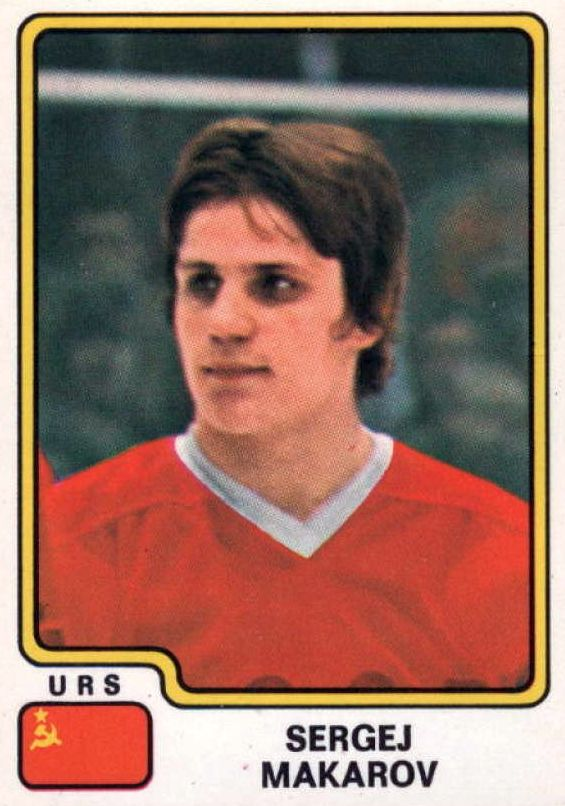
Makarov in 1979

Makarov was trained in the Russian SFSR. He won two World Junior Championships, and was named the best player during his second victory in 1978. Makarov was also on the gold medal-winning Soviet national ice hockey team in the World Championships in 1978, 1979, 1981, 1982, 1983, 1986, 1989 and 1990, and in the Canada Cup in 1981. At the Winter Olympics, he won the gold medal in 1984 and 1988, and a silver in 1980. In the Soviet Union, Makarov played 11 championship seasons with CSKA Moscow, winning the Soviet Player of the Year award (also known as Soviet MVP) three times, getting named to the Soviet League All-Star Team ten times, and leading the league in points nine times and goals three times. Together with Igor Larionov and Vladimir Krutov, they formed the KLM Line, one of the most talented and feared lines ever to play hockey. He was awarded Order of the Red Banner of Labour (1984).

In 1989, Makarov was allowed by the Soviet Union to join the National Hockey League and the Calgary Flames. He won the Calder Memorial Trophy as rookie of the year at the age of 31, doing so with 37 first-place votes over Mike Modano, Jeremy Roenick, and Rod Brind’Amour. Grumbling over whether the Russian leagues counted as amateur or professional led to the league subsequently instituting a rule that became informally known as "The Makarov Rule", where Calder eligibility was cut off to players that were 26 years old as of September 15 of their rookie season. At 25.9%, his shooting percentage was the highest of all NHL players.

After four seasons in Calgary, Makarov was traded on June 20, 1993 to the Hartford Whalers in exchange for future considerations (which became a fourth-round pick in the 1993 NHL Draft, used to select Jason Smith). Six days later on draft day, he was included in a notable trade which saw the Whalers trade the sixth-overall (Viktor Kozlov), 45th-overall (Vlastimil Kroupa), and 58th-overall (Ville Peltonen) picks and Makarov to the San Jose Sharks in exchange for the second-overall pick, which Hartford used to select Chris Pronger. Makarov would play for the Sharks from 1993 to 1995, helping them to their first two playoff appearances as a franchise. Following a dip in production during his second season with the Sharks, the team waived Makarov ahead of the 1995–96 season, which Makarov subsequently sat out. During which, he served as an assistant coach for the Russian national team during the 1996 World Cup.

In the 1996–97 season, Makarov made two comeback attempts, first with the Dallas Stars who were desperate to insert some offensive into their lineup despite winning 7 of their first 8 games to start the season, for whom he played four games between 15–29 November, followed by playing for HC Fribourg-Gottéron in Switzerland's Nationalliga A with former teammates Vyacheslav Bykov and Andrei Khomutov.

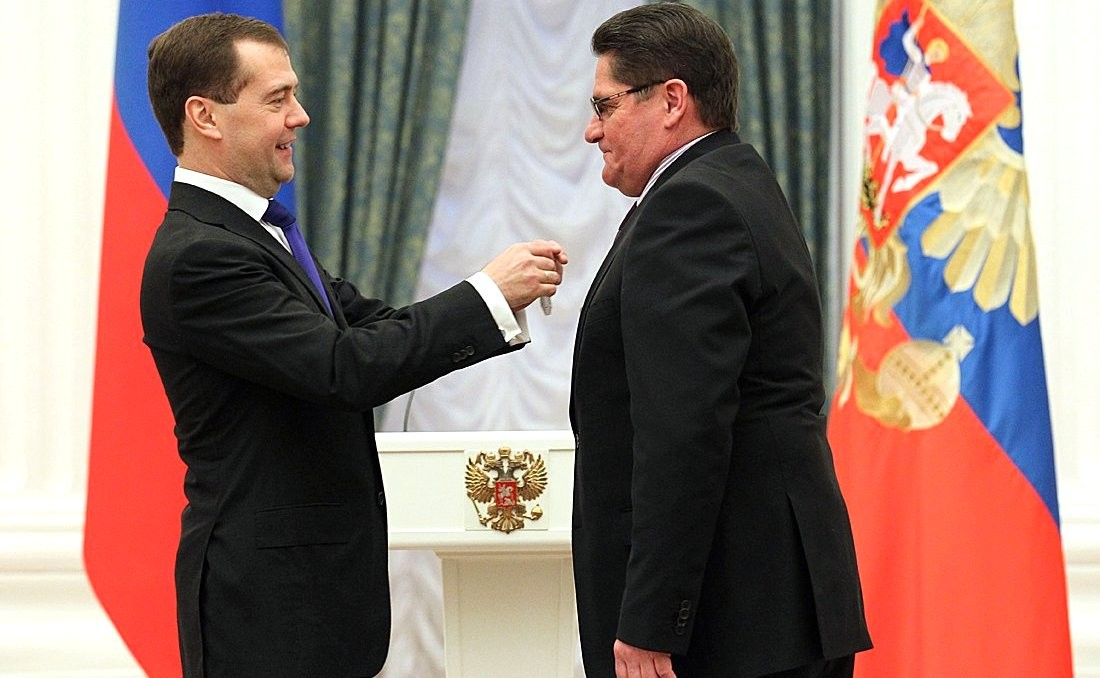
With Dmitry Medvedev on presentation of the Order of Honour, 29 December 2011

In 2001, Makarov was inducted into the IIHF Hall of Fame during the Ice Hockey World Championship in Germany. On 27 June 2016, it was announced that he would be inducted into the Hockey Hall of Fame on 14 November 2016 along with Eric Lindros, Rogie Vachon and Pat Quinn (posthumously).

== Career statistics ==
=== Regular season and playoffs ===
			Regular season					Playoffs
Season	Team	League	GP	G	A	Pts	PIM	GP	G	A	Pts	PIM
1976–77	Traktor Chelyabinsk	USSR	11	1	0	1	4	—	—	—	—	—
1977–78	Traktor Chelyabinsk	USSR	36	18	13	31	10	—	—	—	—	—
1978–79	CSKA Moscow	USSR	44	18	21	39	12	—	—	—	—	—
1979–80	CSKA Moscow	USSR	44	29	39	68	16	—	—	—	—	—
1980–81	CSKA Moscow	USSR	49	42	37	79	22	—	—	—	—	—
1981–82	CSKA Moscow	USSR	46	32	43	75	18	—	—	—	—	—
1982–83	CSKA Moscow	USSR	30	25	17	42	6	—	—	—	—	—
1983–84	CSKA Moscow	USSR	44	36	37	73	28	—	—	—	—	—
1984–85	CSKA Moscow	USSR	40	26	39	65	28	—	—	—	—	—
1985–86	CSKA Moscow	USSR	40	30	32	62	28	—	—	—	—	—
1986–87	CSKA Moscow	USSR	40	21	32	53	26	—	—	—	—	—
1987–88	CSKA Moscow	USSR	51	23	45	68	50	—	—	—	—	—
1988–89	CSKA Moscow	USSR	44	21	33	54	42	—	—	—	—	—
1989–90	Calgary Flames	NHL	80	24	62	86	55	6	0	6	6	0
1990–91	Calgary Flames	NHL	78	30	49	79	44	3	1	0	1	0
1991–92	Calgary Flames	NHL	68	22	48	70	60	—	—	—	—	—
1992–93	Calgary Flames	NHL	71	18	39	57	40	—	—	—	—	—
1993–94	San Jose Sharks	NHL	80	30	38	68	78	14	8	2	10	4
1994–95	San Jose Sharks	NHL	43	10	14	24	40	11	3	3	6	4
1996–97	Dallas Stars	NHL	4	0	0	0	0	—	—	—	—	—
1996–97	HC Fribourg–Gottéron	NDA	6	3	2	5	2	1	0	0	0	0
USSR totals			519	322	388	710	290	—	—	—	—	—
NHL totals			424	134	250	384	317	34	12	11	23	8

=== International ===
Year	Team	Event	Result	GP	G	A	Pts	PIM
1977	Soviet Union	WJC	1st place, gold medalist(s)	7	4	4	8	4
1978	Soviet Union	WJC	1st place, gold medalist(s)	7	8	7	15	4
1978	Soviet Union	WC	1st place, gold medalist(s)	10	3	2	5	5
1979	Soviet Union	WC	1st place, gold medalist(s)	8	8	4	12	6
1980	Soviet Union	OG	2nd place, silver medalist(s)	7	5	6	11	2
1981	Soviet Union	WC	1st place, gold medalist(s)	7	3	6	9	0
1981	Soviet Union	CC	1st place, gold medalist(s)	7	3	6	9	0
1982	Soviet Union	WC	1st place, gold medalist(s)	10	6	7	13	8
1983	Soviet Union	WC	1st place, gold medalist(s)	10	9	9	18	18
1984	Soviet Union	OG	1st place, gold medalist(s)	7	3	3	6	6
1984	Soviet Union	CC	3rd place, bronze medalist(s)	6	6	1	7	4
1985	Soviet Union	WC	3rd place, bronze medalist(s)	10	9	5	14	8
1986	Soviet Union	WC	1st place, gold medalist(s)	10	4	14	18	12
1987	Soviet Union	WC	2nd place, silver medalist(s)	10	4	10	14	8
1987	Soviet Union	CC	2nd place, silver medalist(s)	9	7	8	15	8
1988	Soviet Union	OG	1st place, gold medalist(s)	8	3	8	11	10
1989	Soviet Union	WC	1st place, gold medalist(s)	10	5	3	8	8
1990	Soviet Union	WC	1st place, gold medalist(s)	7	2	1	3	8
1991	Soviet Union	WC	3rd place, bronze medalist(s)	8	3	7	10	6
Junior totals				14	12	11	23	8
Senior totals				145	83	89	172	129

Awards
Preceded by Boris Mikhailov	Soviet MVP; 1980	Succeeded by Vladislav Tretiak
Preceded by Nikolai Drozdetsky	Soviet MVP; 1985	Succeeded by Viacheslav Fetisov
Preceded by Igor Larionov	Soviet MVP; 1989	Succeeded by Andrei Khomutov
Preceded by Vladimir Petrov	Soviet Scoring Champion; 1980, 1981, 1982	Succeeded by Helmuts Balderis
Preceded by Helmuts Balderis	Soviet Scoring Champion; 1984, 1985, 1986, 1987, 1988, 1989	Succeeded by Dmitri Kvartalnov
Preceded by Brian Leetch	Winner of the Calder Memorial Trophy; 1990	Succeeded by Ed Belfour
