= KLM Line =

Group of Soviet ice hockey players

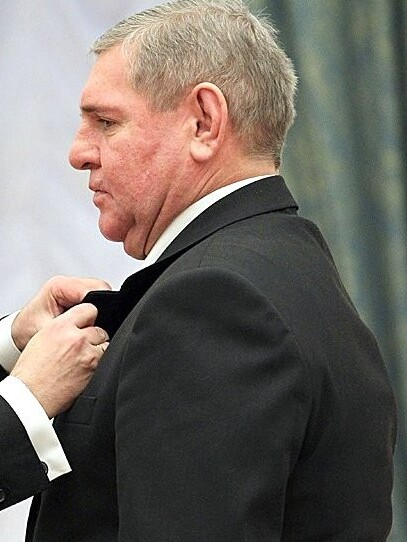
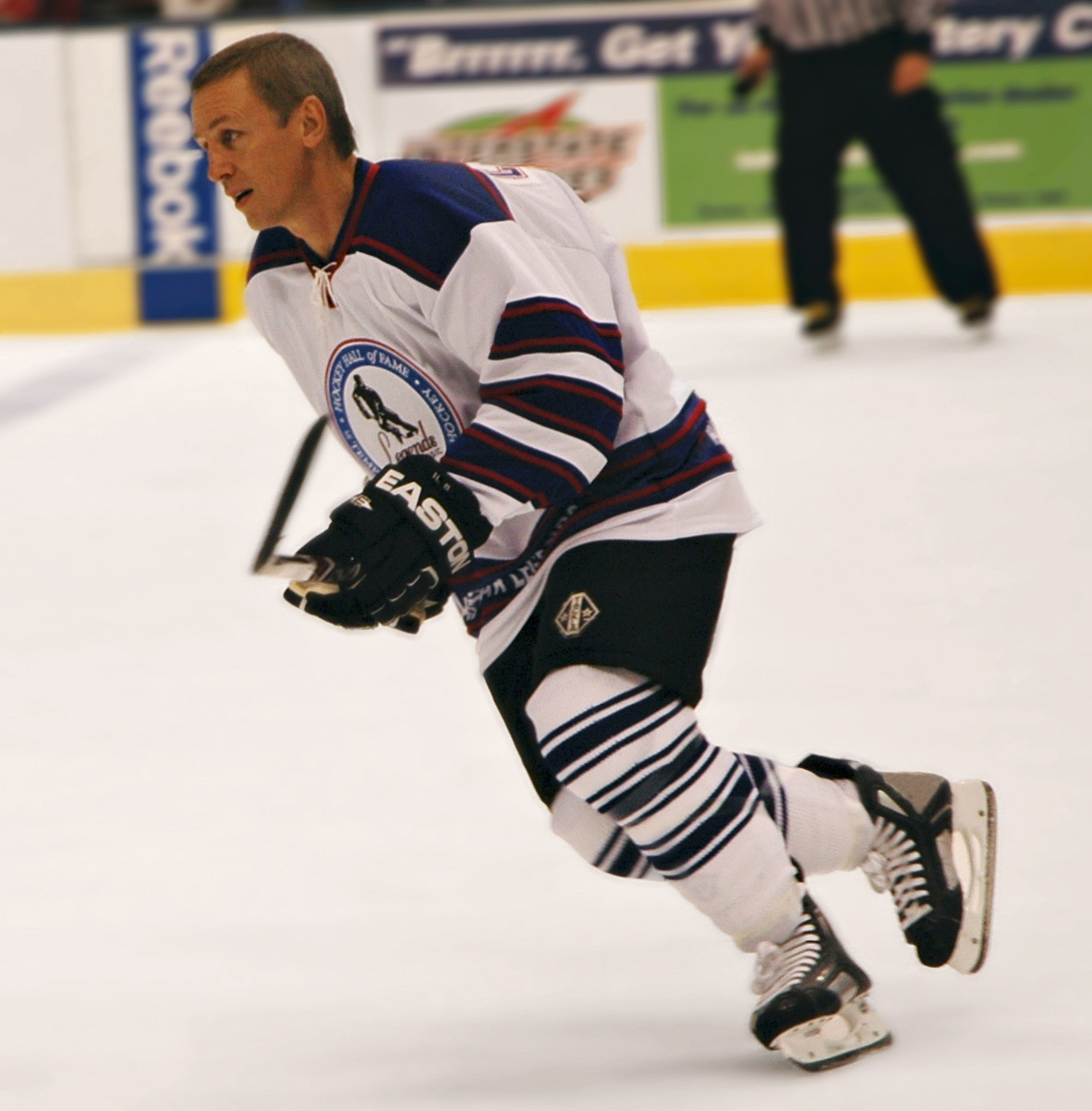
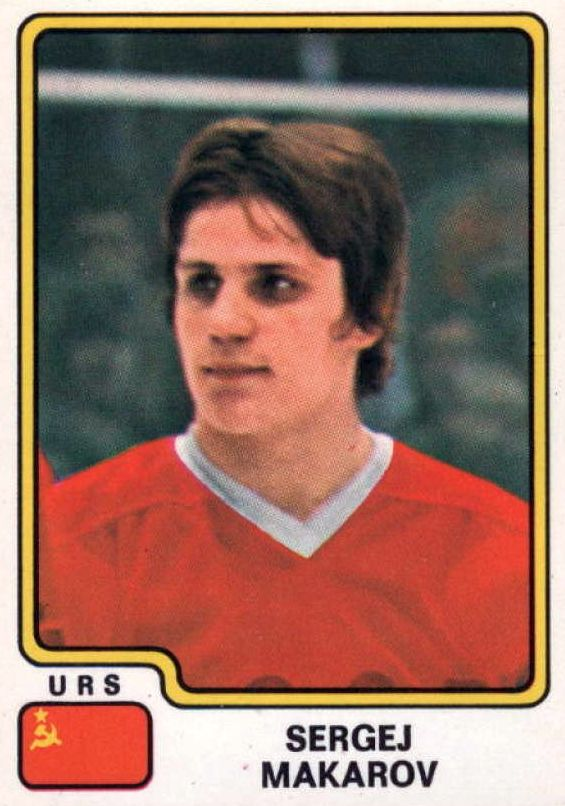
From left: Krutov in 2011, Larionov in 2008, Makarov in 1979

KLM Line is the name given to a group of forwards of the USSR national ice hockey team and the Russian club CSKA in the 1980s. The line was composed of left wing Vladimir Krutov (1960–2012), centre Igor Larionov (born 1960), and right wing Sergei Makarov (born 1958). "KLM" comes from the first letters of the players' last names. (Note: Another group sometimes known by the same acronym is a lineup combination of the Dallas Stars, which particularly stood out in the 2003–04 season, composed of Niko Kapanen, Jere Lehtinen and Brenden Morrow.)

In Russia, the KLM Line is widely considered to be the best offensive lineup ever. In the 1990s, Larionov became part of another notable ice hockey unit, the Russian Five of the Detroit Red Wings.

== Origin ==
It was a long tradition in the Soviet Union to discover and promote such ranks over the years. In the 1940s and 1950s, there were Yevgeni Babich, Vsevolod Bobrov and Viktor Shuvalov. In the 1960s, there were Konstantin Loktev, Alexander Almetov and Veniamin Alexandrov; Boris Mayorov, Vyacheslav Starshinov and Yevgeni Mayorov; Vladimir Vikulov, Viktor Polupanov and Anatoli Firsov. In the 1970s, there were Boris Mikhailov, Valeri Kharlamov and Vladimir Petrov, who were then included in the KLM series 'that dominated the Soviet and international scene during the 1980s'.

The Russian national coach Viktor Tikhonov first discovered the talented skater and left-handed shooter Sergei Makarov. Tikhonov then brought him to HC CSKA Moscow.

Vladimir Krutov, a left wing, was discovered by Valeri Kharlamov. Krutov had been educated and trained at CSKA and supported the army club at the time.

Voskresensk-born Igor Larionov, the later center of the series was discovered by Nikolay Epshtein while playing for Khimik Voskresensk.

== Soviet national team ==
Each of them won numerous prizes and championships, but they were particularly strong as a team: together with the defenders Viacheslav Fetisov and Alexei Kasatonov they formed the first block for years of the Soviet national team and were instrumental in their victories at that time.

When these three players entered the ice hockey scene during the 1981 Canada Cup, they were 21 (Krutov and Larionov) and 23 (Makarov) years old, but they were already stars. They scored 22 points (11 + 11) in seven games during the tournament and were the unit of measurement within the Soviet group. So they also won the final against Canada with 8–1. They also beat the best of the NHL in the 1979 Challenge Cup by winning the final, decisive game 6–0.

In the 1984 Canada Cup, the KLM series collected another 18 points (10 + 8) in six games. However, they lost the semifinals to Canada 2–3 in overtime.

In 1987, played the KLM series again at the Canada Cup and fought a duel with the storm series for Goulet - Gretzky - Lemieux from the Canadian national team. The KLM series scored 32 points (15 + 17) in reaching nine games.

In the late 1980s, Tikhonov began preparing to replace the KLM series with a new trio: Mogilny - Fedorov - Bure, which, however, did not last long due to the departure of all three hockey players in the NHL.
