= 1983 Ice Hockey World Championships =

1983 edition of the IIHF World Championship

Tournament details
- Host country: West Germany
- Venues: 3 (in 3 host cities)
- Dates: 16 April – 2 May
- Teams: 8

Final positions
- Champions: Soviet Union (19th title)
- Runners-up: Czechoslovakia
- Third place: Canada
- Fourth place: Sweden

Tournament statistics
- Games played: 40
- Goals scored: 263 (6.58 per game)
- Attendance: 189,555 (4,739 per game)
- Scoring leader: (Soviet Union) Sergei Makarov 18 points

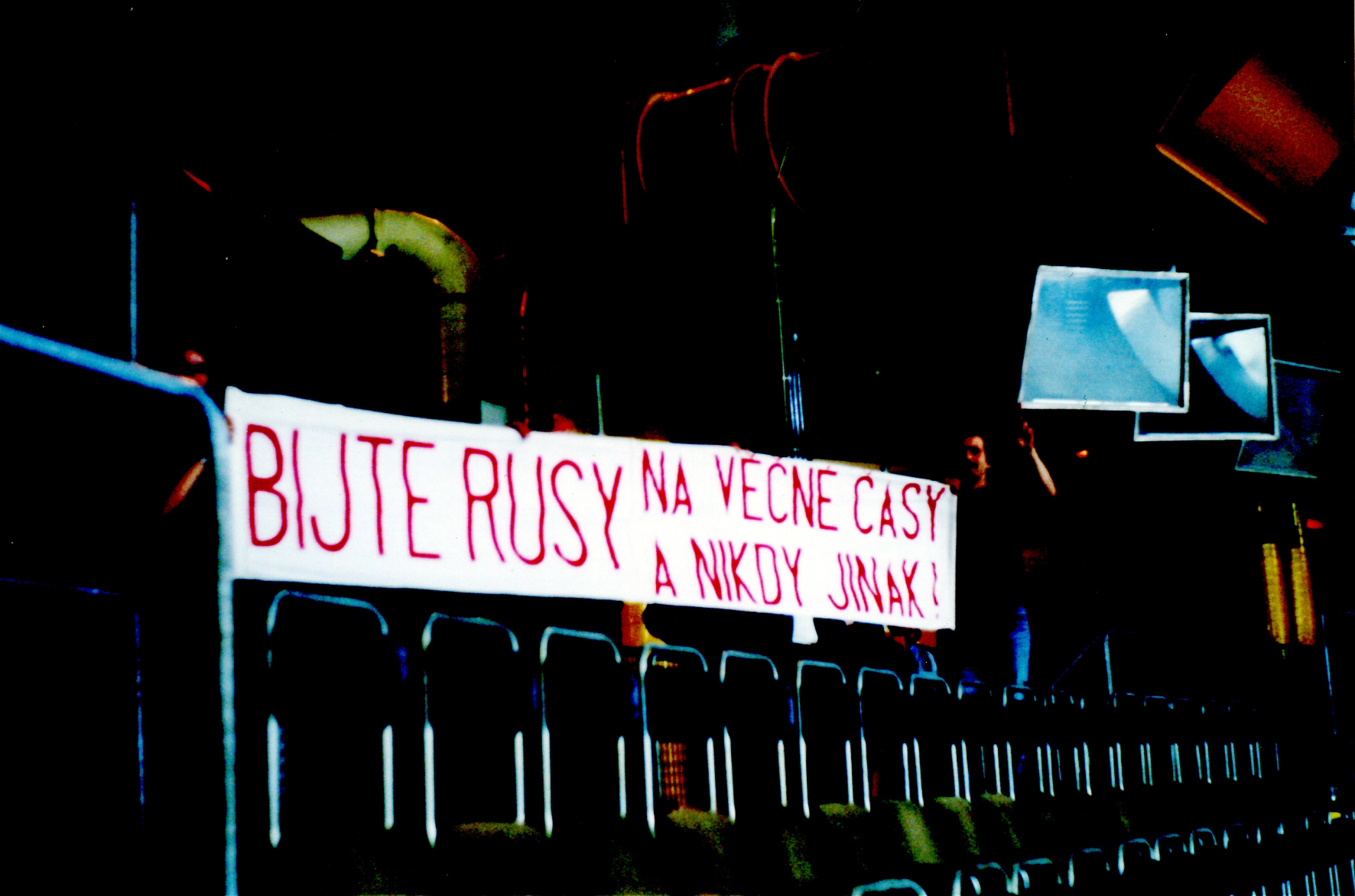
During the 1983 hockey world championships in Munich (Germany) Czech emigrants are showing a banner protesting against the Soviet occupation of their country since the suppression of the Prague Spring.

The 1983 Ice Hockey World Championships took place in West Germany from 16 April to 2 May. The games were played in Munich, Dortmund and Düsseldorf. Eight teams took part, with each playing each other once. The four best teams then play each other once more with no results carrying over this time, and the other four teams played each other again to determine ranking and relegation. This was the 49th World Championships, and also the 60th European Championships. The Soviet Union became world champions for the 19th time, tying Canada, and won their 22nd European title.

Promotion and relegation was effective for 1985 as the IIHF did not run a championship in Olympic years at this time. Nations that did not participate in the Sarajevo Olympics were invited to compete in the Thayer Tutt Trophy.

== World Championship Group A (West Germany) ==
=== First round ===
Pos	Team	Pld	W	D	L	GF	GA	GD	Pts
1	Soviet Union	7	7	0	0	41	7	+34	14
2	Canada	7	5	0	2	26	16	+10	10
3	Czechoslovakia	7	4	1	2	30	15	+15	9
4	Sweden	7	4	1	2	26	21	+5	9
5	West Germany	7	3	1	3	17	23	−6	7
6	East Germany	7	2	0	5	19	28	−9	4
7	Finland	7	1	1	5	20	28	−8	3
8	Italy	7	0	0	7	5	46	−41	0

16 April	Canada	6–0	Italy

16 April	Soviet Union	3–0	East Germany

16 April	Czechoslovakia	4–2	Finland

16 April	Sweden	5–1	West Germany

17 April	Sweden	3–2	Canada

17 April	West Germany	4–0	Italy

17 April	Czechoslovakia	6–1	East Germany

17 April	Soviet Union	3–0	Finland

19 April	Soviet Union	8–2	Canada

19 April	Czechoslovakia	4–1	Sweden

19 April	West Germany	4–3	Finland

19 April	East Germany	3–1	Italy

20 April	Sweden	5–4	East Germany

20 April	Soviet Union	6–0	West Germany

21 April	Canada	3–1	Czechoslovakia

21 April	Finland	6–2	Italy

22 April	Canada	5–1	Finland

22 April	West Germany	4–3	East Germany

23 April	Soviet Union	5–1	Czechoslovakia

23 April	Sweden	5–1	Italy

24 April	Canada	5–2	East Germany

24 April	Finland	4–4	Sweden

24 April	Soviet Union	11–1	Italy

24 April	West Germany	3–3	Czechoslovakia

25 April	Canada	3–1	West Germany

25 April	East Germany	6–4	Finland

26 April	Czechoslovakia	11–0	Italy

26 April	Soviet Union	5–3	Sweden

=== Final Round ===
Pos	Team	Pld	W	D	L	GF	GA	GD	Pts
1	Soviet Union	3	2	1	0	13	3	+10	5
2	Czechoslovakia	3	2	1	0	10	6	+4	5
3	Canada	3	1	0	2	9	14	−5	2
4	Sweden	3	0	0	3	2	11	−9	0

28 April	Czechoslovakia	5–4	Canada

28 April	Soviet Union	4–0	Sweden

30 April	Canada	3–1	Sweden

30 April	Soviet Union	1–1	Czechoslovakia

2 May	Soviet Union	8–2	Canada

2 May	Czechoslovakia	4–1	Sweden

=== Consolation Round ===
Pos	Team	Pld	W	D	L	GF	GA	GD	Pts
5	West Germany	10	5	1	4	31	34	−3	11
6	East Germany	10	3	0	7	29	40	−11	6
7	Finland	10	2	2	6	30	40	−10	6
8	Italy	10	1	1	8	16	56	−40	3

Italy was relegated to Group B.

27 April	West Germany	5–4	Italy

27 April	East Germany	6–2	Finland

29 April	Finland	4–2	West Germany

29 April	Italy	3–1	East Germany

1 May	West Germany	7–3	East Germany

1 May	Italy	4–4	Finland

== World Championship Group B (Japan) ==
Played in Tokyo 21–31 March.

Pos	Team	Pld	W	D	L	GF	GA	GD	Pts
9	United States	7	6	1	0	53	14	+39	13
10	Poland	7	5	1	1	43	19	+24	11
11	Austria	7	3	4	0	41	27	+14	10
12	Norway	7	4	0	3	29	28	+1	8
13	Japan	7	2	2	3	23	31	−8	6
14	Switzerland	7	1	2	4	25	35	−10	4
15	Romania	7	1	1	5	20	48	−28	3
16	Yugoslavia	7	0	1	6	18	50	−32	1

The United States was promoted to Group A, and both Romania and Yugoslavia were relegated to Group C. Additionally, the USA, Poland and Austria earned berths in the Olympics. Fourth place Norway had to play off against the Group C winner (the Netherlands) to fill the final Olympic spot.

21 March	Japan	3–2	Yugoslavia

21 March	Norway	5–3	Romania

22 March	Poland	7–1	Norway

22 March	Austria	8–8	Switzerland

22 March	United States	13–2	Yugoslavia

23 March	United States	6–2	Romania

23 March	Japan	3–3	Switzerland

24 March	Poland	12–2	Yugoslavia

24 March	Austria	3–2	Norway

24 March	Japan	6–2	Romania

25 March	Austria	5–5	Poland

25 March	United States	5–2	Switzerland

26 March	Romania	7–7	Yugoslavia

26 March	Japan	4–5	Norway

27 March	Poland	6–4	Switzerland

27 March	United States	3–3	Austria

28 March	Norway	6–2	Yugoslavia

28 March	Romania	4–3	Switzerland

28 March	United States	6–2	Poland

28 March	Japan	5–5	Austria

30 March	Austria	12–2	Romania

30 March	Switzerland	4–1	Yugoslavia

30 March	United States	8–2	Norway

30 March	Japan	1–2	Poland

31 March	Norway	8–1	Switzerland

31 March	Austria	5–2	Yugoslavia

31 March	Poland	9–0	Romania

31 March	Japan	1–12	United States

== World Championship Group C (Hungary) ==
Played in Budapest 11–20 March. The champion earned the right to playoff against Group B fourth place for a berth in the Olympics.

Pos	Team	Pld	W	D	L	GF	GA	GD	Pts
17	Netherlands	7	7	0	0	78	11	+67	14
18	Hungary	7	5	0	2	50	25	+25	10
19	China	7	4	1	2	28	23	+5	9
20	Denmark	7	4	0	3	24	26	−2	8
21	France	7	3	1	3	41	25	+16	7
22	Bulgaria	7	1	1	5	20	36	−16	3
23	Spain	7	1	1	5	17	55	−38	3
24	North Korea	7	1	0	6	15	72	−57	2

The Netherlands and Hungary were both promoted to Group B,

11 March	France	2–5	Denmark

11 March	Netherlands	7–2	Bulgaria

11 March	China	5–2	North Korea

11 March	Hungary	17–2	Spain

12 March	Hungary	3–1	France

12 March	North Korea	1–11	Netherlands

13 March	Spain	0–4	Denmark

13 March	Bulgaria	1–5	China

14 March	Hungary	14–1	North Korea

14 March	France	0–10	Netherlands

14 March	Denmark	4–5	Bulgaria

14 March	Spain	0–5	China

15 March	North Korea	1–24	France

15 March	Hungary	5–12	Netherlands

16 March	Denmark	1–6	China

16 March	Bulgaria	4–4	Spain

17 March	Netherlands	12–1	China

17 March	France	7–1	Spain

17 March	Bulgaria	4–5	North Korea

17 March	Hungary	0–4	Denmark

19 March	Hungary	7–2	Bulgaria

19 March	Netherlands	16–2	Spain

19 March	Denmark	6–3	North Korea

19 March	China	3–3	France

20 March	Spain	8–2	North Korea

20 March	Netherlands	10–0	Denmark

20 March	France	4–2	Bulgaria

20 March	Hungary	4–3	China

== Ranking and statistics ==
1983 IIHF World Championship winners

Soviet Union
19th title

=== Tournament Awards ===
- Best players selected by the directorate:
  - Best Goaltender: (Soviet Union) Vladislav Tretiak
  - Best Defenceman: (Soviet Union) Alexei Kasatonov
  - Best Forward: (Czechoslovakia) Jiří Lála
- Media All-Star Team:
  - Goaltender: (Soviet Union) Vladislav Tretiak
  - Defence: (Soviet Union) Viacheslav Fetisov, (Soviet Union) Alexei Kasatonov
  - Forwards: (Soviet Union) Vladimir Krutov, (Soviet Union) Igor Larionov, (Soviet Union) Sergei Makarov

=== Final standings ===
The final standings of the tournament according to IIHF:

1st place, gold medalist(s)	Soviet Union
2nd place, silver medalist(s)	Czechoslovakia
3rd place, bronze medalist(s)	Canada
4	Sweden
5	West Germany
6	East Germany
7	Finland
8	Italy

=== European championships final standings ===
The final standings of the European championships according to IIHF:

Gold medal	Soviet Union
Silver medal	Czechoslovakia
Bronze medal	Sweden
4	West Germany
5	East Germany
6	Finland
7	Italy

=== Scoring leaders ===
List shows the top skaters sorted by points, then goals.

Player	GP	G	A	Pts	PIM	POS
(Soviet Union) Sergei Makarov	10	9	9	18	18	F
(Soviet Union) Vladimir Krutov	10	8	7	15	12	F
(Czechoslovakia) Jiří Lála	10	9	5	14	4	F
(Soviet Union) Igor Larionov	9	5	7	12	4	F
(West Germany) Erich Kühnhackl	10	5	7	12	28	F
(Soviet Union) Alexei Kasatonov	10	1	10	11	14	D
(Soviet Union) Vyacheslav Fetisov	10	3	7	10	8	D
(Czechoslovakia) Igor Liba	10	2	8	10	0	F
(Canada) Marcel Dionne	10	6	3	9	2	F
(Finland) Anssi Melametsä	10	6	3	9	20	F
