= Vladimir Krutov =

Russian ice hockey player (1960–2012)

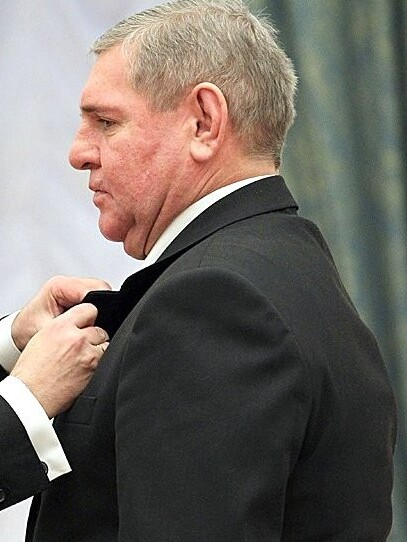
- Krutov in 2011
- Born: 1 June 1960 Moscow, Russian SFSR, Soviet Union
- Died: 6 June 2012 (aged 52) Moscow, Russia
- Height: 176 cm (5 ft 9 in)
- Weight: 194 lb (88 kg; 13 st 12 lb)
- Position: Left wing
- Shot: Left
- Played for: HC CSKA Moscow; Vancouver Canucks; Zürcher SC; Östersunds IK; Brunflo IK
- National team: Soviet Union
- NHL draft: 238th overall, 1986; Vancouver Canucks
- Playing career: 1977–1996

Vladimir Yevgenyevich Krutov (Russian: Владимир Евгеньевич Крутов; 1 June 1960 – 6 June 2012), nicknamed "the Tank", was a Russian professional ice hockey forward. Together with Igor Larionov and Sergei Makarov, he was part of the famed "KLM Line". He is considered one of the best ice hockey wingers of the 1980s.

An instrumental part of the Soviet Union national team in the 1980s, Krutov won the 1981 Canada Cup, two gold medals (1984, 1988) and one silver (1980) at the Olympics, and five golds (1981, 1982, 1983, 1986, 1989), one silver (1987) and one bronze (1985) in the World Championships. He was the scoring leader at the 1987 World Championships.

On the club level, Krutov played for CSKA Moscow from 1978 to 1989. He was one of the first Soviet players to make the jump to the National Hockey League (NHL), doing so with the Vancouver Canucks in 1989. However, Krutov did not have a successful season, battling homesickness and weight problems, which provoked the derisive nickname of "Vlad the Inhaler".

Krutov left the NHL after his lone season in North America and played for several clubs in the Swiss and Swedish leagues before retiring to move into coaching. In 2010, Krutov was inducted into the IIHF Hall of Fame. Alexei Krutov, one of his two sons, also played ice hockey professionally.

Krutov died of internal bleeding and liver failure in a hospital in Moscow on 6 June 2012, five days after his 52nd birthday.

== Career statistics ==
=== Regular season and playoffs ===
| | | | Regular season | | | | | Playoffs |
| Season | Team | League | GP | G | A | Pts | PIM | GP | G | A | Pts | PIM |
|---|---|---|---|---|---|---|---|---|---|---|---|---|
| 1977–78 | CSKA Moscow | USSR | 1 | 0 | 0 | 0 | 0 | — | — | — | — | — |
| 1978–79 | CSKA Moscow | USSR | 24 | 8 | 3 | 11 | 6 | — | — | — | — | — |
| 1979–80 | CSKA Moscow | USSR | 40 | 30 | 12 | 42 | 16 | — | — | — | — | — |
| 1980–81 | CSKA Moscow | USSR | 47 | 25 | 15 | 40 | 20 | — | — | — | — | — |
| 1981–82 | CSKA Moscow | USSR | 46 | 37 | 29 | 66 | 30 | — | — | — | — | — |
| 1982–83 | CSKA Moscow | USSR | 44 | 32 | 21 | 53 | 34 | — | — | — | — | — |
| 1983–84 | CSKA Moscow | USSR | 44 | 37 | 20 | 57 | 20 | — | — | — | — | — |
| 1984–85 | CSKA Moscow | USSR | 40 | 23 | 30 | 53 | 26 | — | — | — | — | — |
| 1985–86 | CSKA Moscow | USSR | 40 | 31 | 17 | 48 | 10 | — | — | — | — | — |
| 1986–87 | CSKA Moscow | USSR | 39 | 26 | 24 | 50 | 16 | — | — | — | — | — |
| 1987–88 | CSKA Moscow | USSR | 38 | 19 | 23 | 42 | 20 | — | — | — | — | — |
| 1988–89 | CSKA Moscow | USSR | 35 | 20 | 21 | 41 | 12 | — | — | — | — | — |
| 1989–90 | Vancouver Canucks | NHL | 61 | 11 | 23 | 34 | 20 | — | — | — | — | — |
| 1990–91 | Zürcher SC | NDA | 1 | 0 | 1 | 1 | 0 | 3 | 3 | 6 | 9 | 0 |
| 1991–92 | Zürcher SC | NDA | 28 | 13 | 19 | 32 | 4 | 6 | 4 | 3 | 7 | 4 |
| 1992–93 | Östersunds IK | SWE III | 19 | 25 | 24 | 49 | 12 | — | — | — | — | — |
| 1993–94 | Östersunds IK | SWE II | 28 | 18 | 22 | 40 | 14 | — | — | — | — | — |
| 1994–95 | Östersunds IK | SWE II | 27 | 9 | 9 | 18 | 31 | — | — | — | — | — |
| 1995–96 | Brunflo IK | SWE III | 18 | 7 | 9 | 16 | 6 | — | — | — | — | — |
| USSR totals | | | 438 | 288 | 215 | 503 | 210 | — | — | — | — | — |

=== International ===
| Year | Team | Event | Place | GP | G | A | Pts | PIM |
|---|---|---|---|---|---|---|---|---|
| 1979 | Soviet Union | WJC | 1st place, gold medalist(s) | 6 | 8 | 6 | 14 | 2 |
| 1980 | Soviet Union | WJC | 1st place, gold medalist(s) | 5 | 7 | 4 | 11 | 5 |
| 1980 | Soviet Union | OG | 2nd place, silver medalist(s) | 7 | 6 | 5 | 11 | 4 |
| 1981 | Soviet Union | WC | 1st place, gold medalist(s) | 8 | 6 | 3 | 9 | 8 |
| 1981 | Soviet Union | CC | 1st place, gold medalist(s) | 7 | 4 | 4 | 8 | 10 |
| 1982 | Soviet Union | WC | 1st place, gold medalist(s) | 10 | 4 | 3 | 7 | 6 |
| 1983 | Soviet Union | WC | 1st place, gold medalist(s) | 10 | 8 | 7 | 15 | 12 |
| 1984 | Soviet Union | OG | 1st place, gold medalist(s) | 7 | 4 | 1 | 5 | 2 |
| 1984 | Soviet Union | CC | 3rd place, bronze medalist(s) | 6 | 3 | 5 | 8 | 4 |
| 1985 | Soviet Union | WC | 3rd place, bronze medalist(s) | 10 | 3 | 5 | 8 | 8 |
| 1986 | Soviet Union | WC | 1st place, gold medalist(s) | 10 | 7 | 10 | 17 | 14 |
| 1987 | Soviet Union | WC | 2nd place, silver medalist(s) | 10 | 11 | 4 | 15 | 8 |
| 1987 | Soviet Union | CC | 2nd place, silver medalist(s) | 9 | 7 | 7 | 14 | 4 |
| 1988 | Soviet Union | OG | 1st place, gold medalist(s) | 8 | 6 | 9 | 15 | 0 |
| 1989 | Soviet Union | WC | 1st place, gold medalist(s) | 10 | 4 | 2 | 6 | 12 |
| Junior totals | | | | 11 | 15 | 10 | 25 | 7 |
| Senior totals | | | | 112 | 73 | 64 | 137 | 92 |

| Preceded by Viacheslav Fetisov | Soviet MVP; 1987 | Succeeded by Igor Larionov |
