= 1986 Ice Hockey World Championships =

1986 edition of the World Ice Hockey Championships

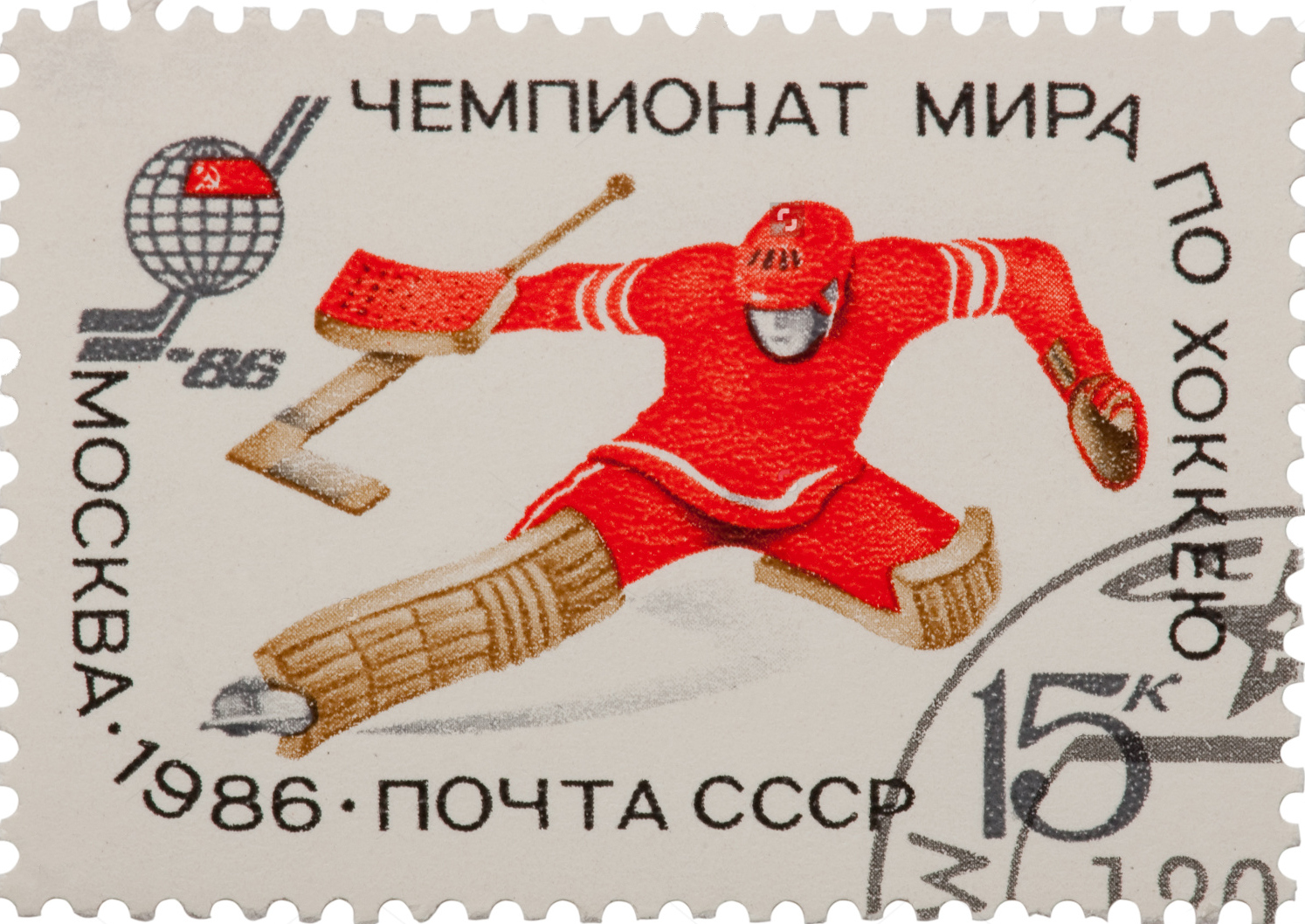
- A Soviet stamp dedicated to the 1986 World Ice Hockey Championships

Tournament details
- Host country: Soviet Union
- Venues: 2 (in 1 host city)
- Dates: 12–28 April
- Teams: 8

Final positions
- Champions: Soviet Union (20th title)
- Runners-up: Sweden
- Third place: Canada
- Fourth place: Finland

Tournament statistics
- Games played: 40
- Goals scored: 296 (7.4 per game)
- Attendance: 375,820 (9,396 per game)
- Scoring leader: (Soviet Union) Sergei Makarov 18 points

The 1986 Ice Hockey World Championships took place in the Soviet Union from 12 to 28 April. The games were played at the Luzhniki Palace of Sports and the CSKA Ice Palace in Moscow, and eight teams took part. Each team played each other once, and then The four best teams then played each other once more with no results carrying over, and the other four teams played each other again to determine ranking and relegation. This was the 51st World Championships, and also the 62nd ice hockey European Championships. The reigning world champions from Czechoslovakia finished fifth, and the Soviet Union became World Champions for the 20th time, and also won their 24th European Championship. In the European Championship, only mutual games between European teams in the first round were counted. For the disappointing Czechoslovaks, this was the first time since 1967 that they had finished out of the medals, and their worst result outside the Olympics since 1937.

Attracting little notice at the time, Brett Hull made his debut in international hockey for the United States. It would appear that if Canadian coach Dave King had invited him to play in Moscow, the college student with dual citizenship, would have happily chosen a different path. Instead he chose to accept coach Dave Peterson's offer to compete for the Americans.

== World Championship Group A (Soviet Union) ==
=== First round ===
Pos	Team	Pld	W	D	L	GF	GA	GD	Pts
1	Soviet Union	7	7	0	0	32	9	+23	14
2	Sweden	7	5	1	1	34	18	+16	11
3	Finland	7	4	2	1	28	18	+10	10
4	Canada	7	3	0	4	24	22	+2	6
5	Czechoslovakia	7	2	1	4	17	17	0	5
6	United States	7	2	0	5	27	28	−1	4
7	West Germany	7	2	0	5	17	39	−22	4
8	Poland	7	1	0	6	15	43	−28	2

12 April	Canada	8–3	West Germany

12 April	Finland	5–4	United States

12 April	Poland	2–1	Czechoslovakia

12 April	Soviet Union	4–2	Sweden

13 April	Sweden	4–1	Canada

13 April	United States	7–2	Poland

13 April	Soviet Union	4–1	Finland

13 April	West Germany	4–3	Czechoslovakia

15 April	Sweden	3–2	Czechoslovakia

15 April	Soviet Union	7–2	Poland

15 April	United States	9–2	West Germany

15 April	Finland	3–2	Canada

16 April	Canada	8–3	Poland

16 April	Finland	1–1	Czechoslovakia

16 April	Soviet Union	4–1	West Germany

16 April	Sweden	5–2	United States

17 April	Soviet Union	4–0	Canada

17 April	Czechoslovakia	5–2	United States

17 April	Finland	4–2	Poland

17 April	Sweden	4–2	West Germany

18 April	Sweden	12–3	Poland

18 April	Finland	10–1	West Germany

19 April	Canada	4–2	United States

19 April	Soviet Union	4–2	Czechoslovakia

20 April	West Germany	4–1	Poland

20 April	Sweden	4–4	Finland

22 April	Czechoslovakia	3–1	Canada

22 April	Soviet Union	5–1	United States

=== Final Round ===
Pos	Team	Pld	W	D	L	GF	GA	GD	Pts
1	Soviet Union	3	3	0	0	18	6	+12	6
2	Sweden	3	1	1	1	12	12	0	3
3	Canada	3	1	0	2	13	16	−3	2
4	Finland	3	0	1	2	7	16	−9	1

24 April	Soviet Union	7–4	Canada

24 April	Sweden	4–4	Finland

26 April	Sweden	6–5	Canada

26 April	Soviet Union	8–0	Finland

28 April	Canada	4–3	Finland

28 April	Soviet Union	3–2	Sweden

=== Consolation round ===
Pos	Team	Pld	W	D	L	GF	GA	GD	Pts
5	Czechoslovakia	10	5	1	4	38	21	+17	11
6	United States	10	4	0	6	41	43	−2	8
7	West Germany	10	2	1	7	23	52	−29	5
8	Poland	10	1	1	8	26	63	−37	3

Poland, needing a win of four goals or more on the final day, tied, and were relegated

23 April	Czechoslovakia	8–1	Poland

23 April	United States	5–0	West Germany

25 April	United States	7–5	Poland

25 April	Czechoslovakia	3–1	West Germany

27 April	Czechoslovakia	10–2	United States

27 April	West Germany	5–5	Poland

== World Championship Group B (Netherlands) ==
Played in Eindhoven 20–29 March. The Swiss, narrowly failing to gain promotion in last year's tournament, made no mistake this year, losing only in a final meaningless game against East Germany. On the last day of competition, four different nations were in danger of relegation, with a myriad of tie breaking scenarios.

Depending on the results of the final day, two of Austria, Japan, the Netherlands, and Yugoslavia would be relegated. In the first game Yugoslavia played Japan with the loser being relegated. A five to zero score relegated Japan. In the next game, Italy beat France, assuring the Austrians of safety from relegation. The Dutch had their fate in their own hands in the last game, a win and they would remain, a loss and they would be relegated. The unfortunate Yugoslavian team had to watch all day and hope, a hope dashed by a Dutch three to two win over Austria.

Pos	Team	Pld	W	D	L	GF	GA	GD	Pts
9	Switzerland	7	6	0	1	38	20	+18	12
10	Italy	7	4	0	3	21	18	+3	8
11	East Germany	7	4	0	3	25	21	+4	8
12	France	7	3	0	4	22	25	−3	6 (Note: France and the Netherlands had 4 four-way head-to-head points each, but France was ahead of the Netherlands 2:0 in two-way head-to-head points.)
13	Netherlands	7	3	0	4	25	32	−7	6
14	Austria	7	3	0	4	24	27	−3	6 (Note: Austria and Yugoslavia had 2 four-way head-to-head points each, but Austria was ahead of Yugoslavia 2:0 in two-way head-to-head points.)
15	Yugoslavia	7	3	0	4	24	25	−1	6
16	Japan	7	2	0	5	15	26	−11	4

Notes:

Switzerland was promoted to Group A. Yugoslavia and Japan were relegated to Group C.

20 March	Netherlands	6–3	Yugoslavia

20 March	East Germany	4–6	Austria

20 March	Switzerland	4–1	Italy

20 March	France	1–2	Japan

21 March	Austria	1–6	Italy

21 March	Japan	4–6	Switzerland

22 March	Netherlands	3–4	France

22 March	East Germany	4–2	Yugoslavia

23 March	Switzerland	8–2	France

23 March	Yugoslavia	2–5	Austria

23 March	Netherlands	3–4	Japan

23 March	East Germany	3–4	Italy

24 March	Japan	0–1	Italy

24 March	Austria	3–4	Switzerland

25 March	France	5–6	Yugoslavia

25 March	Netherlands	2–5	East Germany

26 March	Italy	1–4	Yugoslavia

26 March	Japan	3–4	East Germany

26 March	France	6–1	Austria

26 March	Netherlands	3–11	Switzerland

28 March	East Germany	0–3	France

28 March	Yugoslavia	2–4	Switzerland

28 March	Japan	2–6	Austria

28 March	Netherlands	5–3	Italy

29 March	Yugoslavia	5–0	Japan

29 March	Italy	5–1	France

29 March	Switzerland	1–5	East Germany

29 March	Netherlands	3–2	Austria

== World Championship Group C (Spain) ==
Played in Puigcerda 23 March to 1 April.

=== First round ===
Group C was expanded this year, ten teams were divided into two groups of five. The top two from each group played off for first, while third and fourth places played off for fifth through eighth. Mutual games from the first round were carried forward and counted in the second round. The two last place teams were relegated to the first Group D.

=== Group 1 ===
Pos	Team	Pld	W	D	L	GF	GA	GD	Pts
1	Norway	4	4	0	0	42	7	+35	8
2	Romania	4	3	0	1	26	9	+17	6
3	Denmark	4	2	0	2	18	13	+5	4
4	Spain	4	0	1	3	8	32	−24	1
5	South Korea	4	0	1	3	5	38	−33	1

South Korea was relegated to Group D.

23 March	Norway	10–2	Spain

23 March	Romania	13–0	South Korea

24 March	Norway	11–1	South Korea

24 March	Romania	5–1	Denmark

26 March	South Korea	1–11	Denmark

26 March	Romania	5–2	Spain

27 March	Norway	7–0	Denmark

27 March	Spain	3–3	South Korea

29 March	Denmark	6–0	Spain

29 March	Norway	6–3	Romania

=== Group 2 ===
Pos	Team	Pld	W	D	L	GF	GA	GD	Pts
1	China	4	3	1	0	35	4	+31	7
2	Bulgaria	4	3	0	1	13	16	−3	6
3	North Korea	4	1	1	2	8	15	−7	3
4	Hungary	4	1	1	2	17	14	+3	3
5	Australia	4	0	1	3	9	33	−24	1

Australia was relegated to Group D.

23 March	China	15–0	Australia

23 March	Hungary	2–4	North Korea

24 March	Australia	3–11	Hungary

24 March	China	9–1	Bulgaria

26 March	North Korea	1–9	China

26 March	Australia	4–5	Bulgaria

27 March	North Korea	2–2	Australia

27 March	Bulgaria	5–2	Hungary

29 March	Bulgaria	2–1	North Korea

29 March	Hungary	2–2	China

=== Final Round ===
Pos	Team	Pld	W	D	L	GF	GA	GD	Pts
17	Norway	3	2	1	0	19	7	+12	5
18	China	3	2	1	0	16	7	+9	5
19	Bulgaria	3	1	0	2	9	23	−14	2
20	Romania	3	0	0	3	10	17	−7	0

Norway and China were both promoted to Group B.

30 March	Norway	10–1	Bulgaria

30 March	China	4–3	Romania

1 April	Bulgaria	7–4	Romania

1 April	Norway	3–3	China

=== Consolation round ===
Pos	Team	Pld	W	D	L	GF	GA	GD	Pts
21	Denmark	3	3	0	0	20	5	+15	6
22	Hungary	3	1	0	2	16	17	−1	2
23	North Korea	3	1	0	2	10	14	−4	2
24	Spain	3	1	0	2	11	21	−10	2

30 March	Denmark	8–4	Hungary

30 March	Spain	6–5	North Korea

1 April	Spain	5–10	Hungary

1 April	Denmark	6–1	North Korea

Pos	Team	Pld	W	D	L	GF	GA	GD	Pts
25	South Korea	1	1	0	0	9	7	+2	2
26	Australia	1	0	0	1	7	9	−2	0

31 March	South Korea	9–7	Australia

== Ranking and statistics ==
1986 IIHF World Championship winners

Soviet Union
20th title

=== Tournament Awards ===
- Best players selected by the directorate:
  - Best Goaltender: (Sweden) Peter Lindmark
  - Best Defenceman: (Soviet Union) Viacheslav Fetisov
  - Best Forward: (Soviet Union) Vladimir Krutov
- Media All-Star Team:
  - Goaltender: (Sweden) Peter Lindmark
  - Defence: (Soviet Union) Viacheslav Fetisov, (Soviet Union) Alexei Kasatonov
  - Forwards: (Soviet Union) Vladimir Krutov, (Soviet Union) Igor Larionov, (Soviet Union) Sergei Makarov

=== Final standings ===
The final standings of the tournament according to IIHF:

1st place, gold medalist(s)	Soviet Union
2nd place, silver medalist(s)	Sweden
3rd place, bronze medalist(s)	Canada
4	Finland
5	Czechoslovakia
6	United States
7	West Germany
8	Poland

=== European championships final standings ===
The final standings of the European championships according to IIHF:

Gold medal	Soviet Union
Silver medal	Sweden
Bronze medal	Finland
4	West Germany
5	Poland
6	Czechoslovakia

=== Scoring leaders ===
List shows the top skaters sorted by points, then goals.

Player	GP	G	A	Pts	+/−	PIM	POS
(Soviet Union) Sergei Makarov	10	4	14	18	+21	12	F
(Soviet Union) Vladimir Krutov	10	7	10	17	+23	14	F
(Soviet Union) Viacheslav Fetisov	10	6	9	15	+20	10	D
(Czechoslovakia) Vladimír Růžička	10	4	11	15	+15	6	F
(Czechoslovakia) Jiří Hrdina	10	7	5	12	+14	12	F
(Soviet Union) Vyacheslav Bykov	10	6	6	12	+6	2	F
(Sweden) Anders Carlsson	10	6	6	12	+5	12	F
(Sweden) Thomas Steen	8	8	3	11	+13	16	F
(United States) Brett Hull	10	7	4	11	+1	16	F
(Canada) Brent Sutter	8	4	7	11	+2	8	F

=== Leading goaltenders ===
Only the top five goaltenders, based on save percentage, who have played 50% of their team's minutes are included in this list.

Player	MIP	GA	GAA	SVS%	SO
(Soviet Union) Yevgeni Belosheikin	420	11	1.57	.915	2
(Czechoslovakia) Dominik Hašek	538	19	2.12	.901	0
(United States) Chris Terreri	286	20	4.20	.895	1
(Canada) Jacques Cloutier	298	15	3.02	.893	0
(Finland) Hannu Kamppuri	299	16	3.21	.880	0
