= Viacheslav Fetisov =

Russian ice hockey player (born 1958)

- Hockey Hall of Fame, 2001
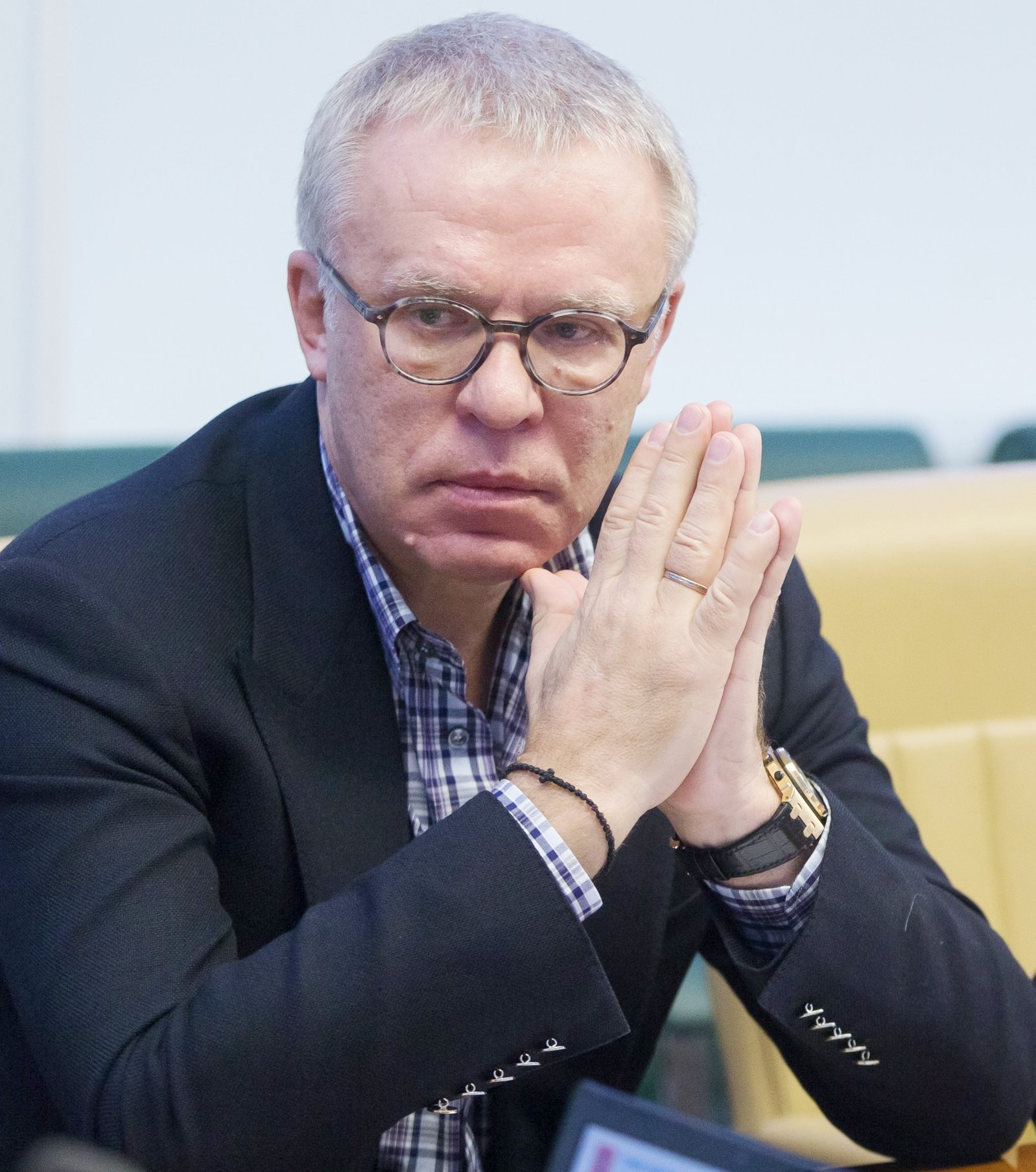
- Fetisov in February 2015
- Born: 20 April 1958 (age 68) Moscow, Russian SFSR, Soviet Union
- Height: 6 ft 1 in (185 cm)
- Weight: 216 lb (98 kg; 15 st 6 lb)
- Position: Defence
- Shot: Left
- Played for: CSKA Moscow; New Jersey Devils; Spartak Moscow; Detroit Red Wings
- National team: Soviet Union and Russia
- NHL draft: 201st overall, 1978; Montreal Canadiens; 145th overall, 1983; New Jersey Devils
- Playing career: 1974–1998, 2009
Medal record
Men's ice hockey
Representing Soviet Union
Olympic Games
Gold medal – first place	1984 Sarajevo
Gold medal – first place	1988 Calgary
Silver medal – second place	1980 Lake Placid
World Championships
Gold medal – first place	1978 Czechoslovakia
Gold medal – first place	1981 Sweden
Gold medal – first place	1982 Finland
Gold medal – first place	1983 West Germany
Gold medal – first place	1986 Soviet Union
Gold medal – first place	1989 Sweden
Gold medal – first place	1990 Switzerland
Silver medal – second place	1987 Austria
Bronze medal – third place	1977 Austria
Bronze medal – third place	1985 Czechoslovakia
Bronze medal – third place	1991 Finland
Canada Cup
Gold medal – first place	1981 Canada
World Junior Championships
Gold medal – first place	1976 Finland
Gold medal – first place	1977 Czechoslovakia
Gold medal – first place	1978 Canada

Member of the State Duma for Moscow Oblast
- Incumbent
- Assumed office 5 October 2016
- Preceded by: constituency re-established
- Constituency: Podolsk (No. 124)

Personal details
- Party: United Russia
- Education: VIFK (MIoPC)
- Viacheslav Fetisov's voice Recorded 19 April 2007

Viacheslav Alexandrovich "Slava" Fetisov MP (Russian: Вячеслав Александрович Фетисов; born 20 April 1958) is a Russian former professional ice hockey defenceman, coach, politician and sports official. He played for HC CSKA Moscow for 13 seasons before joining the National Hockey League (NHL), where he played with the New Jersey Devils and Detroit Red Wings. With the Wings, he won back-to-back Stanley Cups and was part of the team's Russian Five unit. After retiring from his playing career, he became the assistant coach for the New Jersey Devils. Having a very successful four years, he helped get the team to two Stanley Cup finals and one Stanley Cup victory. In addition to that, he won two Olympic gold medals and seven world championships. His Stanley Cup wins, Olympic gold medals, and World Championship wins make him a member of the sport's prestigious Triple Gold Club.

Fetisov was instrumental in breaking the barrier that had prevented Soviet players from leaving the Soviet Union to join the NHL. His actions not only resulted in a number of top Soviet players joining the NHL, but encouraged many of the best players from all over Europe to go to North America. Internationally, he was a long-time captain for the Soviet Union national team and is a two-time Olympic champion. In 2002, Fetisov led the Russian Ice Hockey Olympic team as GM and head coach, attaining a bronze medal. Considered one of the best defencemen of all time, he was voted as one of six players to the International Ice Hockey Federation's (IIHF) Centennial All-Star Team. He was inducted into the IIHF Hall of Fame in 2005.

After retiring as a coach, Fetisov embarked on a political and executive career. After the 2002 Olympic Games, Russian President Vladimir Putin offered him the position as Minister of Sport, a post he held until 2008. He has the federal state civilian service rank of 1st class Active State Councillor of the Russian Federation. He is a member of the upper house of the Federal Assembly of Russia, the Federation Council representing Primorsky Krai, the founder and chairman of the KHL's board of directors and chair of the World Anti-Doping Agency (WADA) Athletes Committee. Fetisov was president of Russian ice hockey club HC CSKA Moscow of the Kontinental Hockey League (KHL). He was also the key member of the bidding committee that presented the Sochi 2014 proposal to the IOC in Guatemala in 2007, when a city was being chosen to host the 2014 Winter Olympics.

Fetisov was Deputy of the State Duma of the Federal Assembly of the Russian Federation of the VII convocation, First Deputy Chairman of the State Duma Committee on Physical Culture, Sports, Tourism and Youth Affairs since 5 October 2016. Fetisov is a member of the Supreme Council of the United Russia party.

== Playing career ==
=== CSKA Moscow (1976–89) ===
Fetisov debuted for CSKA Moscow's junior team at sixteen years old. He joined the senior team in the Soviet Championship League in 1978–79 and recorded 29 points in 29 games as a rookie. In his fourth season, Fetisov reeled off 41 points in 46 games to be named the 1982 USSR Player of the Year. Four seasons later, he won his second Player of the Year recognition after a 34-point season in 1985–86.

=== NHL career (1989–98) ===
Fetisov soon expressed a desire to play in the NHL and submitted a request to Soviet officials. However, Soviet players defecting to North America was strictly discouraged at the time and his request was met with great resistance. Fetisov has recalled the Soviet Minister of Defence, Marshal Dmitry Yazov, giving him an ultimatum at the time to either apologize or be sent to Siberia. Nevertheless, at the age of 31, helped by the Soviets' newfound glasnost policy, Fetisov led a group of eight Soviet players, including Helmuts Balderis, Vladimir Krutov, Igor Larionov, Sergei Makarov, Sergei Mylnikov, Sergei Priakin and Sergei Starikov, into the NHL. Soviet hockey officials agreed to allow Soviet players to play in the NHL as long as they continued to compete internationally for the Soviet Union. Still, 99% of their NHL salaries would go to the Soviet government, something Fetisov later lambasted akin to using players as slaves for profit.

Fetisov had been drafted by the Montreal Canadiens in the 1978 NHL entry draft eleven years prior. However, unable to play in North America at the time, he was re-entered into the 1983 NHL entry draft, where he was selected by the New Jersey Devils. Fetisov debuted with the Devils in 1989–90 and recorded eight goals and 42 points, both NHL career-highs for Fetisov.

He played in New Jersey until 1994–95, when he was traded to the Detroit Red Wings in April 1995. Fetisov began producing immediately with the Red Wings, scoring 14 points in 14 games to finish the season after the trade. He helped the Red Wings to the 1995 Stanley Cup Final, where they were defeated by his former team, the Devils. The following season, Fetisov matched his career high in points with 42-points in 1995–96. He was named to his first NHL All-Star Game in 1997, then won back-to-back Stanley Cups with Detroit in 1997 and 1998, before announcing his retirement. He took the Stanley Cup to Moscow after the 1997 championship, where the trophy appeared for the first time in Russia.

=== One-game return (2009) ===
Nearly eleven years after his retirement, Fetisov came out of retirement at the age of 51 to play for CSKA Moscow in a one-game return on 11 December 2009. Head coach Sergei Nemchinov turned to Fetisov, president of the club, in need of a replacement for injured defenceman Denis Kulyash. CSKA Moscow lost the game 3–2 to SKA St. Petersburg.

== International play ==
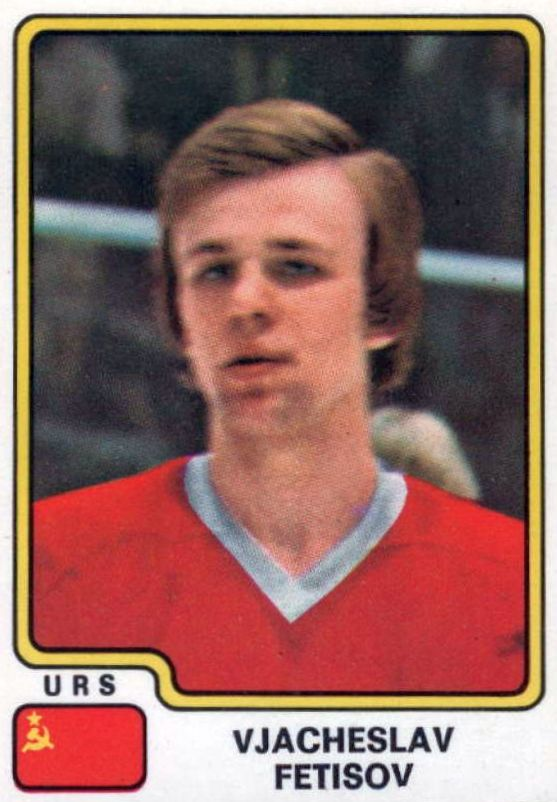
Fetisov on a 1979 card

On the international stage, Fetisov is one of the most decorated players ever. As a junior, Fetisov competed for the Soviet Union at the European Junior Championships, where he won Top Defenceman honors during the 1975–76 season, en route to two consecutive gold medals at the tournament. He then helped the Soviets to three consecutive gold medals at the World Junior Championships from 1976 to 1978, taking back-to-back Top Defenceman honors in 1977 and 1978.

With the Soviet national team, Fetisov won two gold medals (1984, 1988) and one silver medal (1980) at the Olympics. At the World Championships, Fetisov won seven golds (1978, 1981, 1982, 1983, 1986, 1989, 1990), one silver (1987), and three bronzes (1977, 1985, 1991). Fetisov also won one Canada Cup in 1981. At the 2002 Olympics, he was head coach of the Russian national team, winning the bronze. Fetisov and teammate Igor Larionov, along with Scott Niedermayer, Corey Perry, Joe Sakic, Patrice Bergeron, Sidney Crosby, and Jonathan Toews are the only players to win the "Grand Slam of Ice Hockey", winning the Stanley Cup, World Ice Hockey Championships, Ice Hockey Gold Medal at the Winter Olympics, World Ice Hockey Junior Championship, and Canada/World Cup Championship.

== Coaching career ==
Fetisov became an assistant coach with the New Jersey Devils following his playing career and won the Stanley Cup with the club in 2000 during his three-year tenure (1998–2001).

== Executive career ==
Following his tenure as assistant coach with the New Jersey Devils, Fetisov was named general manager of the Russian national team for the 2002 Winter Olympics in Salt Lake City, where Russia won bronze. He was succeeded as general manager by Pavel Bure for the 2006 Winter Olympics in Turin.

On 29 March 2005 Fetisov joined the World Anti-Doping Agency's Athlete Committee as its inaugural chairman.

In 2009, he became president of HC CSKA Moscow. Following the injuries of CSKA's several key defenders, Fetisov, aged 51 at the time, came out of retirement to play against SKA St Petersburg in a one-off return.

Fetisov attended the World Hockey Summit in 2010, and discussed wanting to improve KHL's relationship with the National Hockey League (NHL) with respect to transfer agreements and player contracts. The Russian league sought greater financial compensation when its players departed for the NHL, instead of negotiating a flat rate for an unlimited number of transfers.

== Honors ==
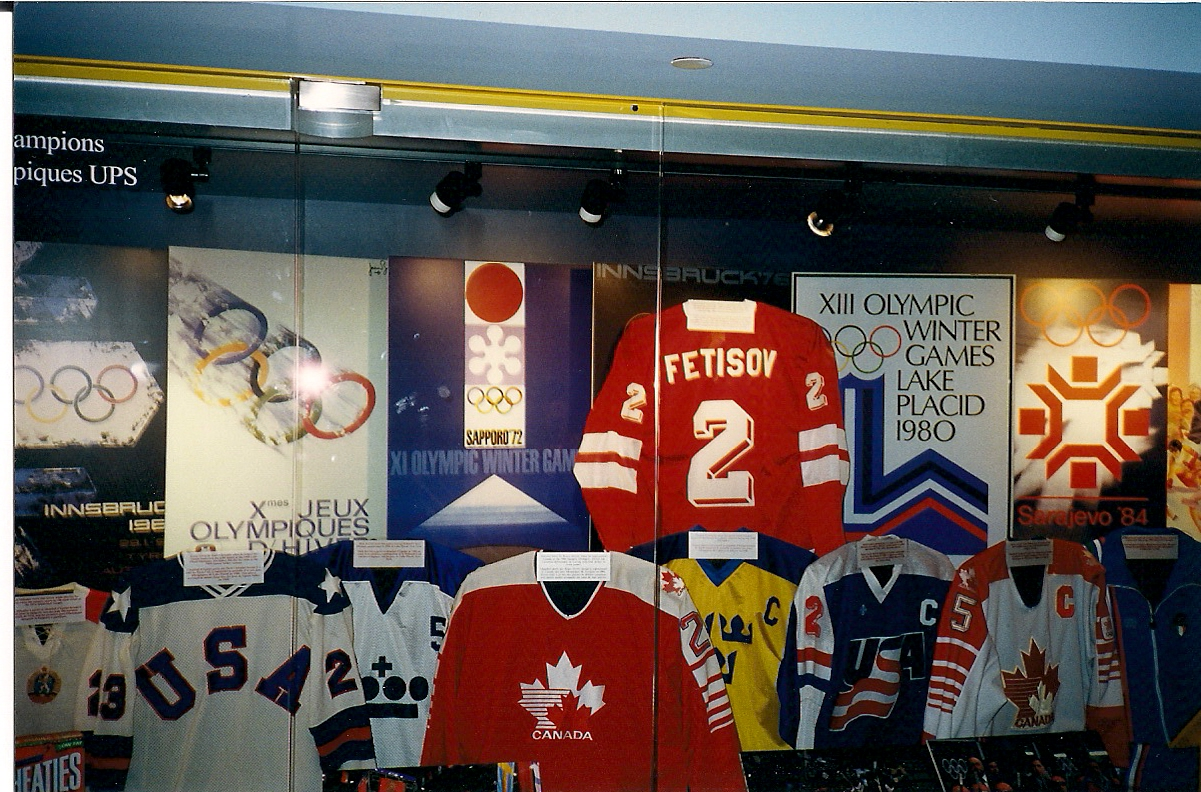
Fetisov's red uniform (#2) from the 1988 Winter Olympics in Calgary at the Hockey Hall of Fame in Toronto in 1999

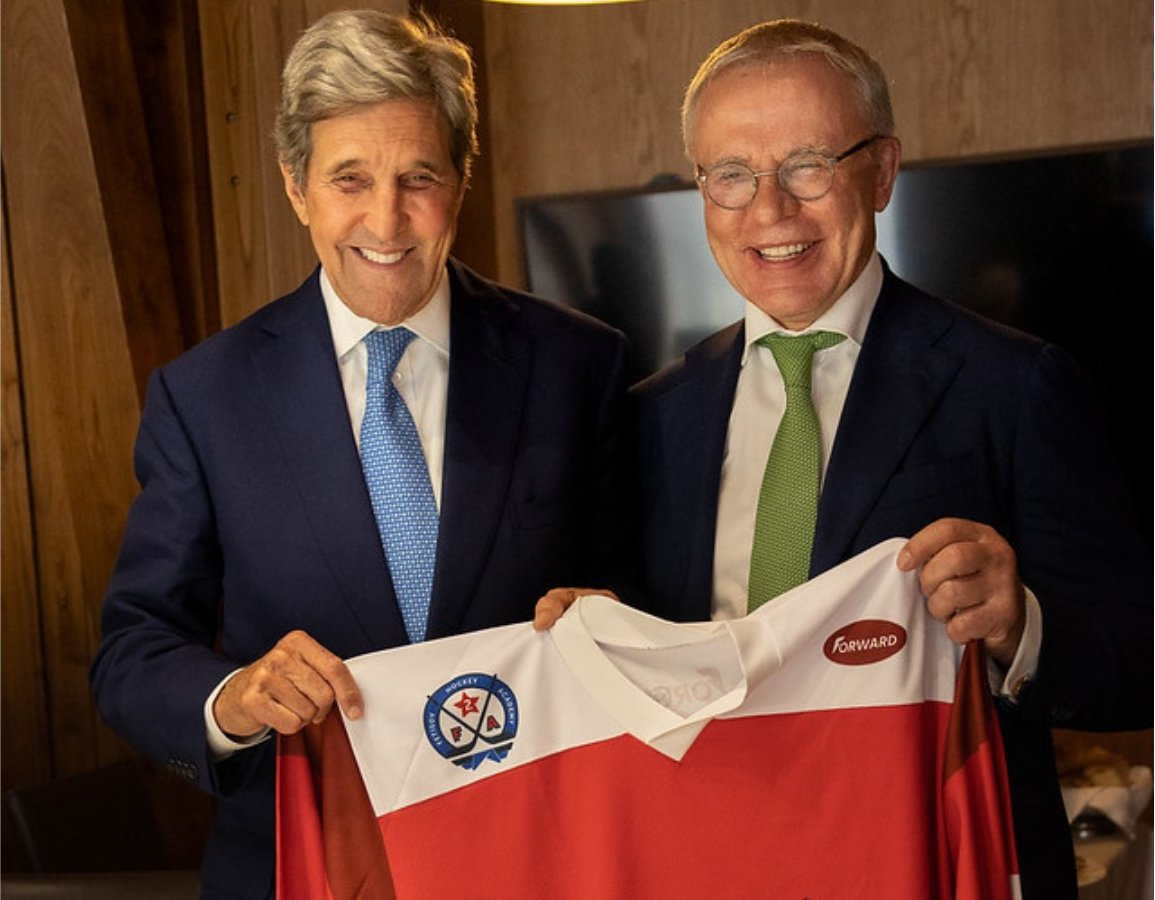
Fetisov and John Kerry on 14 July 2021

In his home country, Fetisov has been awarded the Order of the Red Banner of Labour in 1984, the Order of Lenin in 1988, the Order Of Service To The Fatherland 4th class in 2000 and 3rd class 2005, the Order Of Honour in 1998, the Order of Friendship in 2007, and two Orders of the Badge of Honor. On October 22, 1981, Russian astronomer Nikolai Chernykh discovered a main-belt asteroid from the Crimean Astrophysical Observatory. The asteroid was named the 8806 Fetisov after Fetisov.

In North America, Fetisov was elected to the Hockey Hall of Fame on 12 November 2001 along with Mike Gartner, Dale Hawerchuk and Jari Kurri. Internationally, he has been recognized by the IIHF in the International Centennial All-Star Team. He received the most votes out of all players in a poll conducted by a group of 56 experts from 16 countries (54 of which voted for Fetisov) to assemble the historic squad.

== Personal life ==
He has a daughter, Anastasia, who appeared with him in the 30 for 30 film "Of Miracles and Men."

In June 1985, Fetisov was involved in a car accident that killed his younger brother Anatoly, who was 18 years old at the time and a prospect within the HC CSKA Moscow system.

Twelve years later, following a private party on 13 June 1997, Fetisov, along with teammate Vladimir Konstantinov and team masseur Sergei Mnatsakanov, hired a limousine to drive them home after celebrating the Detroit Red Wings' Stanley Cup triumph. The driver, Richard Gnida, whose license was suspended at the time for drunk driving, lost control of the limousine and hit a tree on the median of Woodward Avenue, in Birmingham, Michigan, a suburb north of Detroit. Konstantinov spent several weeks in a coma before finally pulling through. He also suffered from serious head injuries and paralysis, while Fetisov escaped with relatively minor injuries and was able to play the following season. Mnatsakanov sustained heavy head injuries and also spent some time in a coma. The driver was charged and convicted.

In 2023, he expressed outrage at continued suspension of Russian athletes due to the 2022 Russian invasion of Ukraine:

"I'm terribly sorry for our athletes, because although I myself participated in competitions against the background of the Cold War, this did not prevent me from taking part in the Olympics, playing in the NHL.

Our athletes are now trapped in a situation where a few weeks before the selection for the Olympics, they still cannot understand whether they will be allowed to qualify or not.

It seems to me that we are not very persistent in our position. It was necessary to sit all day in Lausanne, where all decisions are made [IOC headquarters], and ask the same question every day: "Friends, show us why we were suspended." All the excuses that "we care about the safety of athletes" are about nothing. It's disgusting to hear.

The qualifying competitions will begin in March. And if we don't get a decision on the admission of our athletes to the Olympics now, there may be a situation that our athletes may be completely disoriented and not prepared for the selection. And then we just won't get to the Olympics on a sporting basis.

And we are still hesitating, we are not defending our position as decisively as we could. Now is exactly the time when we need to step up, otherwise our athletes will actually lose a normal chance to compete at the Olympics."

=== Sanctions ===
Fetisov was sanctioned by the UK government in 2022 amidst the Russian invasion of Ukraine.

== Political career ==
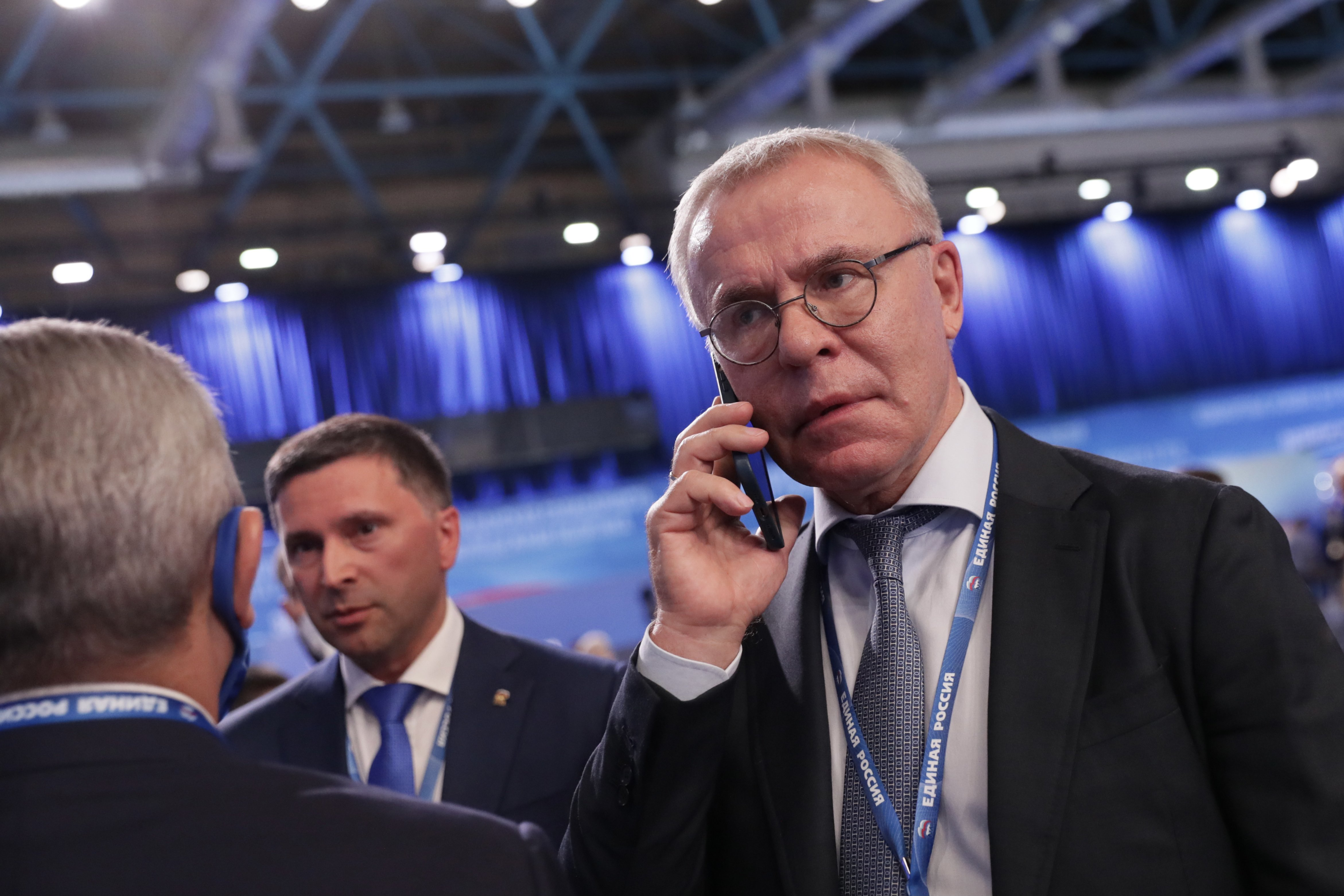
Fetisov during the second stage of the congress of the United Russia party, 2021

From April 2002 to March 2004, Fetisov was Chairman of the State Committee of the Russian Federation for Physical Culture and Sports (Goskomsport).

In September 2003, Fetisov became a member of the Supreme Council of the United Russia party. Since 2003, Fetisov has also actively worked and acted as a member of the Supreme Council of United Russia. Since 2003, he is Acting State Councilor of the Russian Federation, 1st class.

From March to November 2004, Fetisov was Head of the Federal Agency for Physical Culture, Sports and Tourism. From November 2004 to October 2008, he was Head of the Federal Agency for Physical Culture and Sports (Rossport). In November 2007, Fetisov was officially awarded the party card of United Russia.

In September 2008, Vedomosti reported that the Presidium of the General Council of United Russia recommended Fetisov's candidacy for election as a representative of the legislative assembly of Primorsky Krai in the Federation Council (this seat became vacant after Igor Pushkaryov, who represented the regional legislature, was elected mayor of Vladivostok in May of the same year). On the same day, Fetisov consented to become a seaside senator. On 17 October 2008, he was elected a member of the Federation Council from Primorsky Krai. Since 27 October 2008, he has been Chairman of the Federation Council Commission on Physical Culture, Sports, and the Development of the Olympic Movement. Fetisov is a member of the Federation Council Committee on Local Self-Government and the Federation Council Commission on Youth Affairs and Tourism.

On 4 December 2011, he was elected to the Legislative Assembly of Primorsky Krai; however, being again elected as a representative of the regional parliament in the Federation Council, he refused the deputy mandate. Since 16 December 2011, he has been the First Deputy Chairman of the Federation Council Committee on Social Policy.

Since 5 October 2016, Fetisov has been Deputy of the State Duma of the Federal Assembly of the Russian Federation of the VII convocation and the First Deputy Chairman of the State Duma Committee on Physical Culture, Sports, Tourism, and Youth Affairs. Since 16 December 2017, deputy chairman of the board of trustees of the All-Russian Society for the Conservation of Nature. On 12 February 2021, by unanimous decision of all participants of the XVIII Congress of the VOOP, Fetisov was elected Chairman of the Central Council of the All-Russian Society for the Conservation of Nature.

== Career statistics ==
=== Regular season and playoffs ===
			Regular season					Playoffs
Season	Team	League	GP	G	A	Pts	PIM	GP	G	A	Pts	PIM
1974–75	CSKA Moscow	Soviet	1	0	0	0	0	—	—	—	—	—
1975–76	CSKA Moscow	Soviet Jr	—	—	—	—	—	—	—	—	—	—
1976–77	CSKA Moscow	Soviet	28	3	4	7	14	—	—	—	—	—
1977–78	CSKA Moscow	Soviet	35	9	18	27	46	—	—	—	—	—
1978–79	CSKA Moscow	Soviet	29	10	19	29	40	—	—	—	—	—
1979–80	CSKA Moscow	Soviet	37	10	14	24	46	—	—	—	—	—
1980–81	CSKA Moscow	Soviet	47	13	16	29	44	—	—	—	—	—
1981–82	CSKA Moscow	Soviet	46	15	26	41	20	—	—	—	—	—
1982–83	CSKA Moscow	Soviet	43	6	17	23	46	—	—	—	—	—
1983–84	CSKA Moscow	Soviet	44	19	30	49	38	—	—	—	—	—
1984–85	CSKA Moscow	Soviet	20	13	12	25	6	—	—	—	—	—
1985–86	CSKA Moscow	Soviet	40	15	19	34	12	—	—	—	—	—
1986–87	CSKA Moscow	Soviet	39	13	20	33	18	—	—	—	—	—
1987–88	CSKA Moscow	Soviet	46	18	17	35	26	—	—	—	—	—
1988–89	CSKA Moscow	Soviet	23	9	8	17	18	—	—	—	—	—
1989–90	New Jersey Devils	NHL	72	8	34	42	52	6	0	2	2	10
1990–91	New Jersey Devils	NHL	67	3	16	19	62	7	0	0	0	15
1990–91	Utica Devils	AHL	1	1	1	2	0	—	—	—	—	—
1991–92	New Jersey Devils	NHL	70	3	23	26	108	6	0	3	3	8
1992–93	New Jersey Devils	NHL	76	4	23	27	158	5	0	2	2	4
1993–94	New Jersey Devils	NHL	52	1	14	15	30	14	1	0	1	8
1994–95	CSKA Moscow	IHL	1	0	1	1	4	—	—	—	—	—
1994–95	Spartak Moscow	IHL	1	0	1	1	4	—	—	—	—	—
1994–95	New Jersey Devils	NHL	4	0	1	1	0	—	—	—	—	—
1994–95	Detroit Red Wings	NHL	14	3	11	14	2	18	0	8	8	14
1995–96	Detroit Red Wings	NHL	69	7	35	42	96	19	1	4	5	34
1996–97	Detroit Red Wings	NHL	64	5	23	28	76	20	0	4	4	42
1997–98	Detroit Red Wings	NHL	58	2	12	14	72	21	0	3	3	10
2009–10	CSKA Moscow	KHL	1	0	0	0	0	—	—	—	—	—
Soviet totals			478	153	221	374	374	—	—	—	—	—
NHL totals			546	36	192	228	656	116	2	26	28	145

=== International ===
Year	Team	Event	GP	G	A	Pts	PIM
1975	Soviet Union	EJC	5	1	0	1	0
1976	Soviet Union	EJC	4	2	0	2	0
1976	Soviet Union	WJC	4	0	0	0	0
1977	Soviet Union	WJC	7	3	2	5	4
1977	Soviet Union	WC	5	3	3	6	2
1978	Soviet Union	WJC	7	3	5	8	6
1978	Soviet Union	WC	10	4	6	10	11
1980	Soviet Union	OLY	7	5	4	9	10
1981	Soviet Union	WC	8	1	4	5	6
1981	Soviet Union	CC	7	1	7	8	10
1982	Soviet Union	WC	10	4	3	7	6
1983	Soviet Union	WC	10	3	7	10	8
1984	Soviet Union	OLY	7	3	8	11	8
1985	Soviet Union	WC	10	6	7	13	15
1986	Soviet Union	WC	10	6	9	15	10
1987	Soviet Union	WC	10	2	8	10	2
1987	Soviet Union	CC	9	2	5	7	9
1988	Soviet Union	OLY	8	4	9	13	6
1989	Soviet Union	WC	10	2	4	6	17
1990	Soviet Union	WC	8	2	8	10	8
1991	Soviet Union	WC	10	3	1	4	4
1996	Russia	WCH	4	0	2	2	12
Junior totals			27	9	7	16	21
Senior totals			143	51	95	146	144

== Honours and awards ==
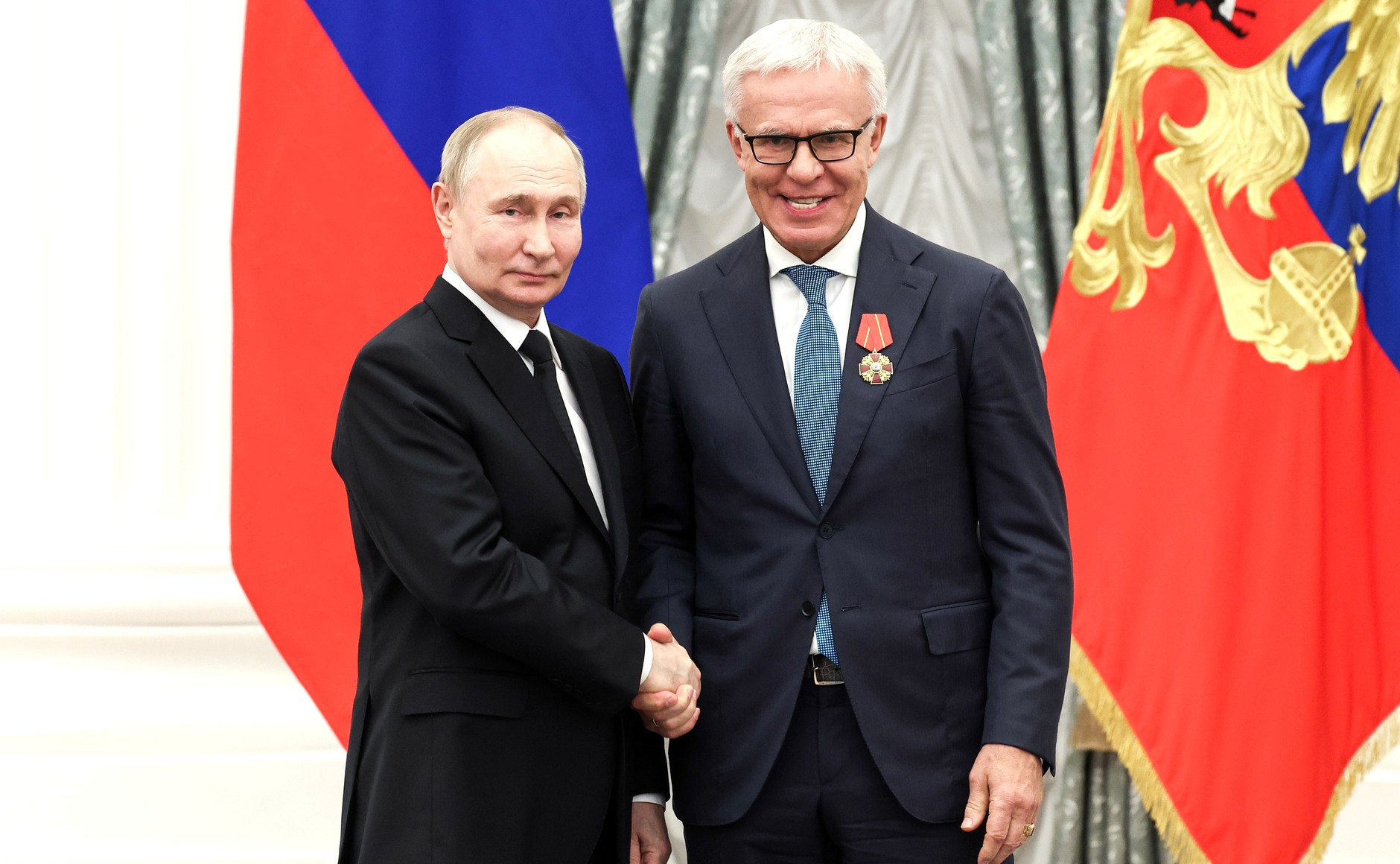
Presentation of the Order of Alexander Nevsky on 30 May 2024

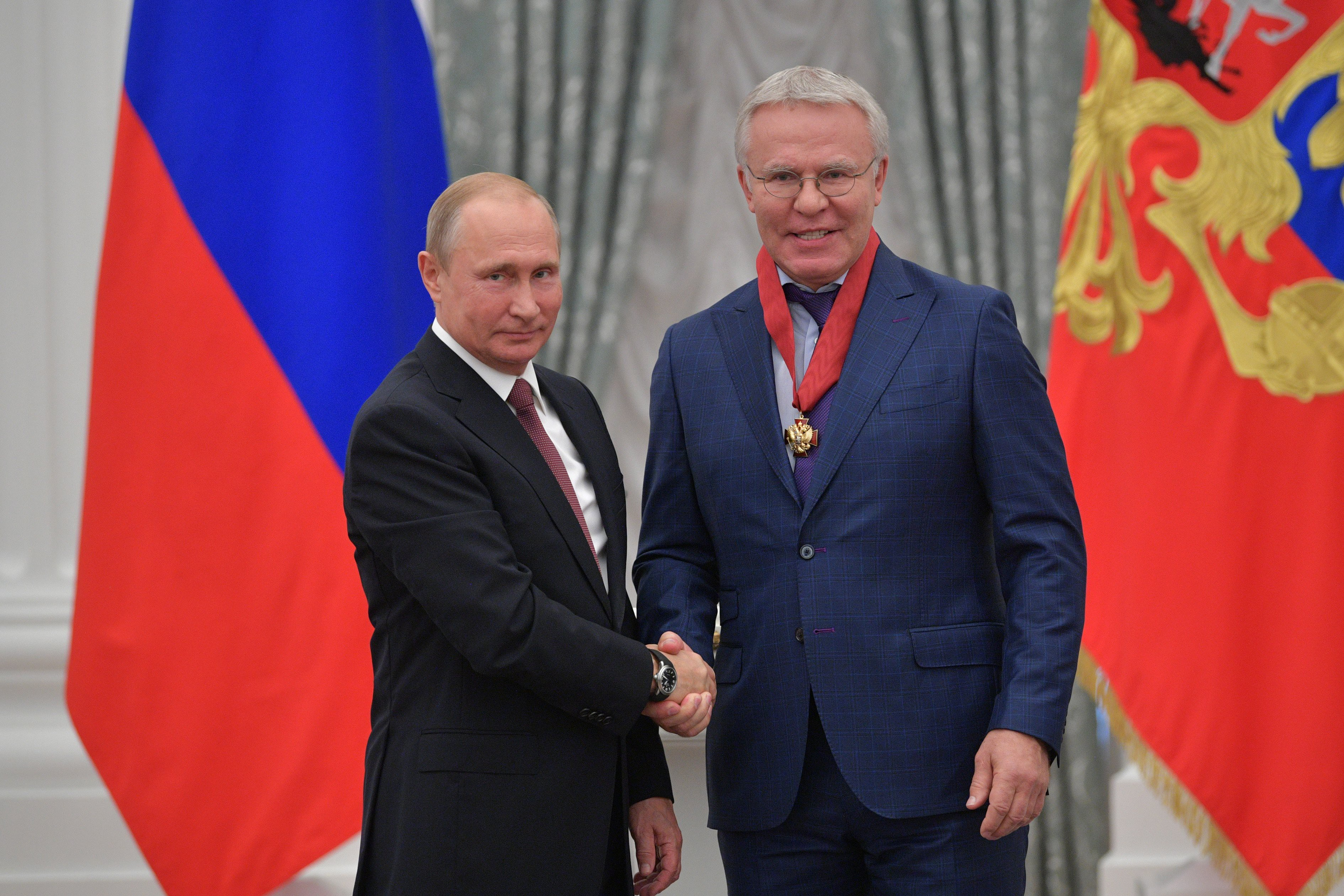
Fetisov with Vladimir Putin in 2018

- Order of Merit for the Fatherland;
  - 2nd class (2018)
  - 3rd class (4 November 2005) – for outstanding contribution to the development of physical culture and sport, the successful performance of the Russian national team at the XXVIII Olympiad in Athens in 2004
  - 4th class (25 August 2000) – for his great personal contribution to the development of Russian hockey
- Order of Alexander Nevsky
- Order of Honour (23 August 1998) – for outstanding contribution to the development of national sport
- Order of Friendship (6 August 2007) – for active participation in efforts to ensure the victory of the application of Sochi to host the XXII Winter Olympics and XI Paralympics in 2014
- Order of Lenin (1988) – for high athletic achievement at the XV Winter Olympic Games in Calgary in 1988
- Order of the Red Banner of Labour (1984) – for high athletic achievement at the XIV Winter Olympic Games in Sarajevo in 1984
- Order of the Badge of Honour, twice (1978, 1981)
- Honoured Worker of Physical Culture, Russia (16 April 2008) – for services in the development of physical culture and sports
- Honored Master of Sports (1978)
- Badge "For Services to the Moscow region"
- Stanley Cup (1997, 1998)
- UNESCO Champion for Sport
- Inducted into the IIHF Hall of Fame in 2005
- "Russian Diamond" (2007) – for his services and achievements in sport

== Movies ==
Fetisov was the main focus of the 2014 documentary movie Red Army, among other influential Soviet players.

Awards
Preceded by Sergei Makarov	Soviet MVP; 1986	Succeeded by Vladimir Krutov
Preceded by Vladislav Tretiak	Soviet MVP; 1982	Succeeded by Vladislav Tretiak
