= IIHF Centennial All-Star Team =

Hockey team of international players

The IIHF Centennial All-Star Team is an all-star team of hockey players from international ice hockey tournaments. The team was chosen based on the players' "impact in international ice hockey over a period of at least a decade," with a requirement that they must have performed "at the highest possible level (Olympics, the IIHF World Championship or the Canada Cup/World Cup tournaments)."

The selection was organized by the International Ice Hockey Federation and named in 2008. The panel comprised 56 ice hockey experts from 16 countries representing a balance between North American and European countries, and included people who have worked in the game for an extended period and whose opinions are widely respected. One of the 56 votes represented the collective opinion of the staff of The Hockey News. No single voter's entire selection was the same as the final team.

All six players were already members of the IIHF Hall of Fame at the time of the All-Star team's creation, and all team members, including Sergei Makarov, are now enshrined in the Hockey Hall of Fame. All four Russians selected to the team played league hockey with CSKA Moscow, including three years (1978 to 1981) as teammates.

== Centennial All-Star Team ==
The players selected:

- Goaltender: Vladislav Tretiak (Soviet Union) – 30 votes
- First defenceman: Viacheslav Fetisov (Soviet Union) – 54 votes
- Second defenceman: Börje Salming (Sweden) – 17 votes
- First winger: Valeri Kharlamov (Soviet Union) – 21 votes
- Second winger: Sergei Makarov (Soviet Union) – 18 votes
- Centre: Wayne Gretzky (Canada) – 38 votes

== Response ==
The response to the selection was generally positive on both sides of the globe. The editors of The Hockey News, which participated in the selection, said they were aware that many Canadians might not like the fact that there is only one player from Canada on the list (Gretzky received 38 votes at centre which was 35 more than anyone else, while Mario Lemieux was 13 votes behind Makarov and Paul Coffey was 13 votes behind Salming), but they proclaimed the selection fair and said that much work had been done to make it objective. Canada's National Post completely supported the selection and even said: "With Wayne Gretzky, four Russians and a Swede on the Centennial All-Star Team, it's a great one". Gregory Sandstrom, a Canadian working at the Saint Petersburg State University, said in The St. Petersburg Times that the Soviet domination on the list was fair, and called on Canada to get revenge on Russia at the following Olympic Games—a goal the national team would accomplish with their gold medal victory in 2010.

At the same time, there were some to criticize the selection for choosing only six players.

== See also ==
- List of IIHF World Championship directorate award winners
- List of IIHF World Championship medalists
