= Soviet MVP (ice hockey) =

The following is a list of the Most Valuable Players in the Soviet ice hockey league, which existed from 1946 to 1991.

== Award winners ==
- 1967-68 Anatoli Firsov
- 1968-69 Anatoli Firsov
- 1969-70 Viktor Konovalenko
- 1970-71 Anatoli Firsov
- 1971-72 Valeri Kharlamov/Alexander Maltsev
- 1972-73 Valeri Kharlamov
- 1973-74 Vladislav Tretiak
- 1974-75 Vladislav Tretiak
- 1975-76 Vladislav Tretiak
- 1976-77 Helmut Balderis
- 1977-78 Boris Mikhailov
- 1978-79 Boris Mikhailov
- 1979-80 Sergei Makarov
- 1980-81 Vladislav Tretiak
- 1981-82 Viacheslav Fetisov
- 1982-83 Vladislav Tretiak
- 1983-84 Nikolai Drozdetsky
- 1984-85 Sergei Makarov
- 1985-86 Vyacheslav Fetisov
- 1986-87 Vladimir Krutov
- 1987-88 Igor Larionov
- 1988-89 Sergei Makarov
- 1989-90 Andrei Khomutov
- 1990-91 Valeri Kamensky

== Most awards ==
- Vladislav Tretiak - 5
- Anatoli Firsov - 3
- Sergei Makarov - 3

== See also ==
- Russian Elite Hockey Scoring Champion
- Russian Elite Hockey Goal Scoring Champion

== Sources ==
CCCP Hockey International
