= Alexei Krutov =

Russian ice hockey player

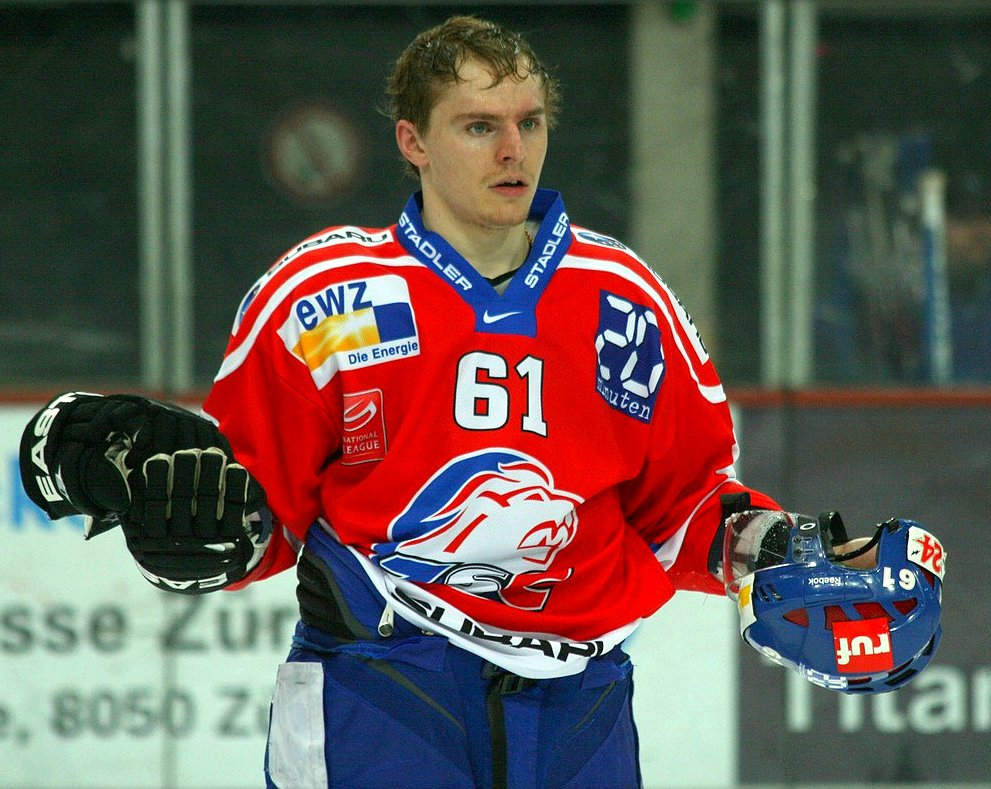
- Born: February 1, 1984 (age 42) Moscow, Soviet Union
- Height: 6 ft 0 in (183 cm)
- Weight: 198 lb (90 kg; 14 st 2 lb)
- Position: Left wing
- Shot: Left
- Played for: HC CSKA Moscow; Metallurg Novokuznetsk; Severstal Cherepovets; ZSC Lions; Avtomobilist Yekaterinburg; Neftekhimik Nizhnekamsk; Spartak Moscow; Genève-Servette HC; HC Red Ice; HC Sochi
- Playing career: 2002–2017

Alexei Vladimirovich Krutov (Russian: Алексей Владимирович Крутов; born February 1, 1984) is a Russian former professional ice hockey winger. He most recently played for HC Red Ice Martigny in the Swiss National League B (NLB) during the 2016–17 NLB season. He is the son of Vladimir Krutov (1960–2012), who represented the Soviet Union in the 1980s.

== Career ==
While playing for ZSC Lions, Krutov won the 2008–09 Champions Hockey League and the 2008 National League A. He later returned to Switzerland to join Genève-Servette HC to end the 2013–14 season.

On July 11, 2014, Krutov signalled his return to his native Russia in accepting a try-out with expansion club, HC Sochi. On August 28, 2014, he was successful in signing a one-year contract for Sochi's inaugural season in 2014–15.
