= 1985 Ice Hockey World Championships =

1985 edition of the IIHF World Ice Hockey Championship

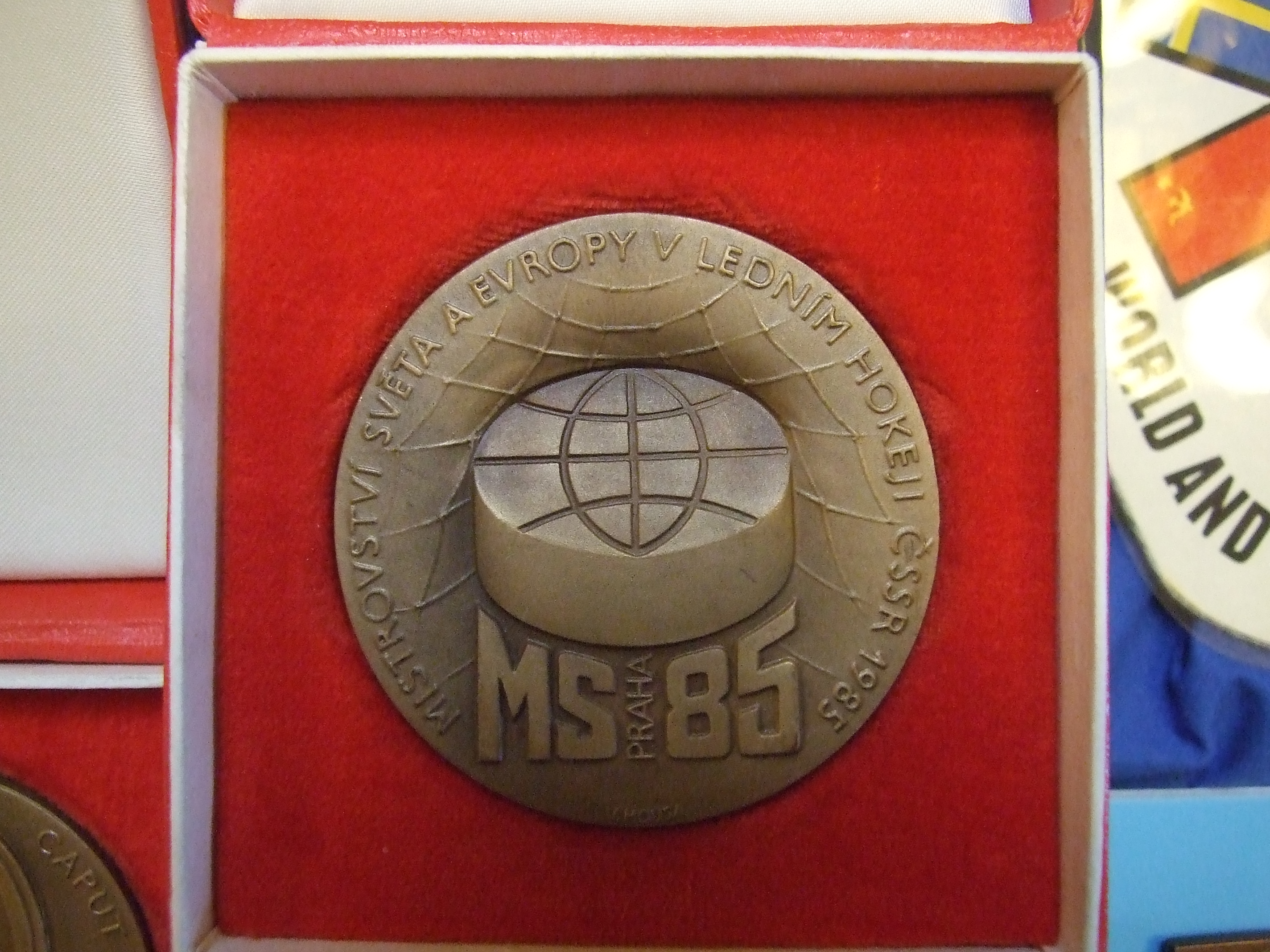

Tournament details
- Host country: Czechoslovakia
- Venues: 2 (in 1 host city)
- Dates: 17 April – 3 May
- Teams: 8

Final positions
- Champions: Czechoslovakia (6th title)
- Runners-up: Canada
- Third place: Soviet Union
- Fourth place: United States

Tournament statistics
- Games played: 40
- Goals scored: 305 (7.63 per game)
- Attendance: 411,659 (10,291 per game)
- Scoring leader: (Soviet Union) Sergei Makarov 14 points

The 1985 Ice Hockey World Championships took place in Prague, Czechoslovakia from 17 April to 3 May. Eight teams took part, with each team playing each other once. The four best teams then played each other once more with no results carrying over, and the other four teams played each other again to determine ranking and relegation. This was the 50th World Championships, and also the 61st European Championships of ice hockey. The home side, Czechoslovakia, became world champions for the 6th time, and the Soviet Union won their 23rd European title. For the European Championship, only games between European sides in the first round are included.

This was a historic tournament in a few respects. The Soviets were playing without goaltender Tretiak for the first time since 1969. This was Canada's best finish since returning to the Championships in 1977, and after defeating the Soviet Union for the first time in the World Championships since 1961, they played for gold on the last day. Despite Canada's silver medal, the first round saw a professionally stocked Canada lose to the Americans for the first time. Perhaps the most surprising aspect of the tournament was Sweden's poor play. After finishing second in the 1984 Canada Cup expectations were high, but they had their worst finish since 1937, playing in the relegation pool for the first time. It would also be East Germany's final appearance at the top level.

The tournament finished on a sour note when the US and Soviet Union faced off against each other for the bronze medal. Several fights broke out, resulting in suspensions of coaches Viktor Tikhonov and Dave Peterson, as well as players Irek Gimayev, Vyacheslav Fetisov and Tim Thomas. Additionally referee Kjell Lind was disciplined for failing to keep control of the game.

== World Championship Group A (Czechoslovakia) ==
=== Venues ===
Prague	Locations of the two venues in Prague.	Prague
Sportovní hala ČSTV; Capacity: 14,000	Locations of the two venues in Prague.	Zimní stadion Eden; Capacity: 5,100

=== First round ===
Pos	Team	Pld	W	D	L	GF	GA	GD	Pts
1	Soviet Union	7	7	0	0	52	8	+44	14
2	United States	7	4	1	2	24	34	−10	9
3	Canada	7	4	1	2	33	23	+10	9
4	Czechoslovakia	7	4	1	2	30	16	+14	9
5	Finland	7	2	2	3	23	25	−2	6
6	Sweden	7	2	0	5	24	30	−6	4
7	West Germany	7	1	1	5	17	31	−14	3
8	East Germany	7	0	2	5	11	47	−36	2

17 April	Canada	9–1	East Germany

17 April	Soviet Union	11–1	United States

17 April	Sweden	3–2	West Germany

17 April	Czechoslovakia	5–0	Finland

18 April	Canada	5–0	West Germany

18 April	Soviet Union	5–1	Finland

18 April	United States	4–3	Sweden

18 April	Czechoslovakia	6–1	East Germany

20 April	United States	4–3	Canada

20 April	Soviet Union	6–0	East Germany

20 April	Czechoslovakia	6–1	West Germany

20 April	Finland	5–0	Sweden

21 April	Canada	5–2	Finland

21 April	Sweden	11–0	East Germany

21 April	Soviet Union	10–2	West Germany

21 April	United States	3–1	Czechoslovakia

23 April	Canada	4–4	Czechoslovakia

23 April	Soviet Union	6–2	Sweden

23 April	United States	4–3	West Germany

23 April	Finland	4–4	East Germany

24 April	United States	5–5	East Germany

24 April	Finland	3–3	West Germany

25 April	Czechoslovakia	7–2	Sweden

25 April	Soviet Union	9–1	Canada

Game reference

26 April	Finland	8–3	United States

26 April	West Germany	6–0	East Germany

27 April	Canada	6–3	Sweden

27 April	Soviet Union	5–1	Czechoslovakia

=== Final Round ===
Pos	Team	Pld	W	D	L	GF	GA	GD	Pts
1	Czechoslovakia	3	3	0	0	18	6	+12	6
2	Canada	3	2	0	1	9	8	+1	4
3	Soviet Union	3	1	0	2	12	8	+4	2
4	United States	3	0	0	3	7	24	−17	0

29 April	Canada	3–2	United States	Sportovní hala ČSTV; Attendance: 13,000

29 April	Czechoslovakia	2–1	Soviet Union	Sportovní hala ČSTV; Attendance: 14,000

1 May	Canada	3–1	Soviet Union	Sportovní hala ČSTV; Attendance: 14,000

Game reference

1 May	Czechoslovakia	11–2	United States	Sportovní hala ČSTV; Attendance: 14,000

3 May	Czechoslovakia	5–3	Canada	Sportovní hala ČSTV; Attendance: 14,000

Game reference

3 May	Soviet Union	10–3	United States	Sportovní hala ČSTV; Attendance: 14,000

=== Consolation round ===
Pos	Team	Pld	W	D	L	GF	GA	GD	Pts
5	Finland	10	4	2	4	39	33	+6	10
6	Sweden	10	4	0	6	37	40	−3	8
7	West Germany	10	3	1	6	28	41	−13	7
8	East Germany	10	0	2	8	16	64	−48	2

East Germany were relegated to Group B.

28 April	Finland	6–2	East Germany

28 April	Sweden	5–2	West Germany

30 April	Sweden	7–2	East Germany

30 April	West Germany	5–4	Finland

2 May	Finland	6–1	Sweden	Attendance: 9,000

2 May	West Germany	4–1	East Germany	Attendance: 8,500

== World Championship Group B (Switzerland) ==
Played in Fribourg 21–31 March. In the final game, the Swiss had to win by more than four to win the tournament. While the margin was attainable, the unpredictable Dutch side shocked the home crowd beating them six to two.

Pos	Team	Pld	W	D	L	GF	GA	GD	Pts
9	Poland	7	6	1	0	37	13	+24	13
10	Switzerland	7	5	1	1	29	13	+16	11
11	Italy	7	5	0	2	29	22	+7	10
12	Austria	7	3	0	4	18	24	−6	6
13	Japan	7	3	0	4	31	36	−5	6
14	Netherlands	7	3	0	4	36	25	+11	6
15	Norway	7	2	0	5	28	38	−10	4
16	Hungary	7	0	0	7	17	54	−37	0

Poland was promoted to Group A, and both Norway and Hungary were relegated to Group C.

21 March	Poland	7–1	Italy

21 March	Switzerland	9–1	Hungary

22 March	Italy	5–2	Netherlands

22 March	Norway	5–8	Japan

22 March	Hungary	0–2	Austria

23 March	Netherlands	3–4	Poland

23 March	Norway	1–2	Switzerland

24 March	Hungary	3–5	Poland

24 March	Switzerland	4–1	Japan

24 March	Austria	1–4	Italy

25 March	Japan	4–3	Netherlands

25 March	Austria	2–5	Norway

26 March	Hungary	1–6	Italy

26 March	Poland	2–2	Switzerland

27 March	Austria	8–3	Japan

27 March	Netherlands	8–2	Norway

28 March	Italy	6–4	Japan

28 March	Netherlands	12–4	Hungary

28 March	Poland	6–4	Norway

28 March	Switzerland	5–1	Austria

30 March	Austria	4–2	Netherlands

30 March	Poland	8–0	Japan

30 March	Norway	9–6	Hungary

30 March	Switzerland	5–1	Italy

31 March	Hungary	2–11	Japan

31 March	Norway	2–6	Italy

31 March	Poland	5–0	Austria

31 March	Switzerland	2–6	Netherlands

== World Championship Group C (France) ==
Played in Megève, Chamonix and Saint-Gervais 14–23 March.

Pos	Team	Pld	W	D	L	GF	GA	GD	Pts
17	France	7	6	1	0	54	13	+41	13
18	Yugoslavia	7	6	0	1	36	13	+23	12
19	China	7	5	1	1	45	22	+23	11
20	Romania	7	4	0	3	51	29	+22	8
21	Denmark	7	3	0	4	16	23	−7	6
22	Bulgaria	7	2	0	5	27	45	−18	4
23	North Korea	7	1	0	6	18	56	−38	2
24	Spain	7	0	0	7	9	55	−46	0

France and Yugoslavia were both promoted to Group B. For France this was their first return to this level since they boycotted in protest in 1972.

14 March	France	12–1	Spain

14 March	Romania	11–3	Bulgaria

14 March	China	3–7	Yugoslavia

14 March	North Korea	1–3	Denmark

15 March	Denmark	1–0	Spain

15 March	France	4–4	China

15 March	Yugoslavia	5–2	Romania

15 March	Bulgaria	8–1	North Korea

17 March	France	12–0	North Korea

17 March	Yugoslavia	4–3	Denmark

17 March	Romania	8–2	Spain

17 March	China	10–4	Bulgaria

18 March	North Korea	5–18	Romania

18 March	France	2–1	Yugoslavia

18 March	Denmark	1–6	China

18 March	Bulgaria	9–3	Spain

20 March	Bulgaria	0–4	Yugoslavia

20 March	France	6–2	Denmark

20 March	North Korea	8–1	Spain

20 March	Romania	4–6	China

22 March	China	6–1	North Korea

22 March	France	10–2	Bulgaria

22 March	Romania	5–0	Denmark

22 March	Yugoslavia	7–1	Spain

23 March	France	8–3	Romania

23 March	China	10–1	Spain

23 March	Yugoslavia	8–2	North Korea

23 March	Denmark	6–1	Bulgaria

== Ranking and statistics ==
1985 IIHF World Championship winners

Czechoslovakia
6th title

=== Tournament Awards ===
- Best players selected by the directorate:
  - Best Goaltender: (Czechoslovakia) Jiří Králík
  - Best Defenceman: (Soviet Union) Viacheslav Fetisov
  - Best Forward: (Soviet Union) Sergei Makarov
- Media All-Star Team:
  - Goaltender: (Czechoslovakia) Jiří Králík
  - Defence: (Soviet Union) Viacheslav Fetisov, (Soviet Union) Alexei Kasatonov
  - Forwards: (Soviet Union) Vladimir Krutov, (Soviet Union) Sergei Makarov, (Czechoslovakia) Vladimír Růžička

=== Final standings ===
The final standings of the tournament according to IIHF:

1st place, gold medalist(s)	Czechoslovakia
2nd place, silver medalist(s)	Canada
3rd place, bronze medalist(s)	Soviet Union
4	United States
5	Finland
6	Sweden
7	West Germany
8	East Germany

=== European championships final standings ===
The final standings of the European championships according to IIHF:

Gold medal	Soviet Union
Silver medal	Czechoslovakia
Bronze medal	Finland
4	Sweden
5	West Germany
6	East Germany

=== Scoring leaders ===
List shows the top skaters sorted by points, then goals.

Player	GP	G	A	Pts	+/−	PIM	POS
(Soviet Union) Sergei Makarov	10	9	5	14	+2	8	F
(Czechoslovakia) Jiří Lála	10	8	5	13	+9	6	F
(Soviet Union) Viacheslav Fetisov	10	6	7	13	+19	15	D
(Soviet Union) Nikolai Drozdetsky	10	5	7	12	+17	4	F
(Finland) Hannu Järvenpää	10	9	2	11	+4	10	F
(Czechoslovakia) Vladimír Růžička	10	8	3	11	+5	0	F
(Sweden) Kent Nilsson	8	6	5	11	−1	6	F
(Soviet Union) Alexei Kasatonov	9	5	6	11	+13	14	D
(Soviet Union) Mikhail Varnakov	10	6	4	10	+17	0	F
(West Germany) Dieter Hegen	10	5	5	10	0	4	F

=== Leading goaltenders ===
Only the top five goaltenders, based on save percentage, who have played 50% of their team's minutes are included in this list.

Player	MIP	GA	GAA	SVS%	SO
(Soviet Union) Vladimir Myshkin	580	13	1.34	.936	1
(Czechoslovakia) Jiří Králík	540	17	1.89	.922	1
(Finland) Kari Takko	420	23	3.29	.891	1
(West Germany) Karl Friesen	520	34	3.92	.886	0
(United States) John Vanbiesbrouck	489	46	5.64	.866	0
