= 1984–85 Soviet League season =

Soviet ice hockey season

The 1984–85 Soviet Championship League season was the 39th season of the Soviet Championship League, the top level of ice hockey in the Soviet Union. 12 teams participated in the league, and CSKA Moscow won the championship.

== First round ==
	Club	GP	W	T	L	GF	GA	Pts
1.	Dynamo Moscow	22	19	1	2	107	46	39
2.	CSKA Moscow	22	16	3	3	115	54	35
3.	Sokol Kiev	22	12	2	8	78	63	26
4.	Khimik Voskresensk	22	11	4	7	74	66	26
5.	SKA Leningrad	22	9	3	10	58	75	21
6.	Torpedo Gorky	22	8	4	10	61	80	20
7.	Spartak Moscow	22	8	3	11	67	73	19
8.	Dinamo Riga	22	7	5	10	63	71	19
9.	Izhstal Izhevsk	22	9	1	12	68	88	19
10.	Traktor Chelyabinsk	22	4	8	10	47	62	16
11.	Krylya Sovetov Moscow	22	6	4	12	73	96	16
12.	Avtomobilist Sverdlovsk	22	2	4	16	72	109	8

== Second round ==
	Club	GP	W	T	L	GF	GA	Pts
1.	Dynamo Moscow	36	29	4	3	178	80	62
2.	CSKA Moscow	36	28	5	3	194	84	61
3.	Sokol Kiev	36	18	5	13	134	129	41
4.	Khimik Voskresensk	36	16	6	14	119	125	38
5.	Torpedo Gorky	36	15	7	14	119	123	37
6.	Spartak Moscow	36	12	6	18	111	126	30
7.	SKA Leningrad	36	10	4	22	93	145	24
8.	Dinamo Riga	36	9	6	21	108	149	24

== Final round ==
=== Championship round ===
	Club	GP	W	T	L	GF	GA	Pts
1.	CSKA Moscow	44	31	6	3	221	95	68
2.	Dynamo Moscow	44	31	5	4	189	96	67
3.	Sokol Kiev	44	18	5	17	144	151	41

=== 4th-8th place ===
	Club	GP	W	T	L	GF	GA	Pts
4.	Torpedo Gorky	52	23	7	22	166	179	53
5.	Spartak Moscow	52	20	9	23	176	180	49
6.	Khimik Voskresensk	52	20	8	24	169	183	48
7.	Dinamo Riga	52	18	9	25	170	196	45
8.	SKA Leningrad	52	17	4	31	148	208	38

== Relegation ==
	Club	GP	W	T	L	GF	GA	Pts
9.	Izhstal Izhevsk	50	28	2	20	215	187	58
10.	Krylya Sovetov Moscow	50	26	6	18	179	167	58
11.	Traktor Chelyabinsk	50	21	10	19	148	133	52
12.	Avtomobilist Sverdlovsk	50	18	6	26	190	206	42
