= List of 1984 Winter Olympics medal winners =

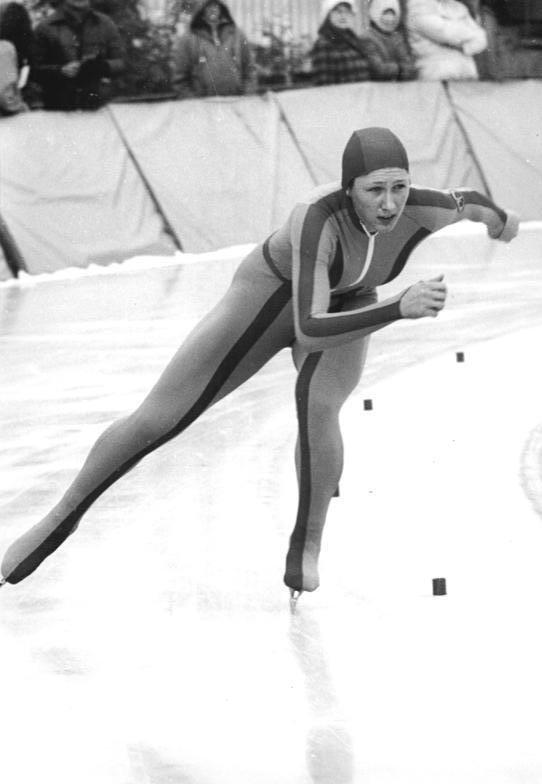
Karin Enke, an East German speed skater, was one of three athletes who won four medals at the 1984 Winter Olympics.

The 1984 Winter Olympics – officially known by the International Olympic Committee as the XIV Olympic Winter Games – were a winter multi-sport event held between 8 and 19 February 1984 in Sarajevo, Yugoslavia (currently Bosnia and Herzegovina). A total of 1,272 athletes, representing a record 49 National Olympic Committees (NOCs), competed in 39 events across 10 disciplines of 6 sports. The official program was the same as that of the 1980 Winter Olympics, with the addition of a 20-kilometer event in women's cross-country skiing. Disabled skiing was featured for the first time as an Olympic demonstration sport.

The 117 Olympic medals in dispute at these Games were awarded to athletes from 17 NOCs. The athletes from the Soviet Union collected 25 medals and secured their NOC a top spot in the overall medal count, ahead of East Germany (24 medals) and Finland (13 medals). East Germany, however, topped the gold medal count with nine medals, three more than those won by Soviet athletes. Finland, the United States and Sweden followed with four gold medals each. The host delegation won the nation's first medal at the Winter Olympics, through alpine skier Jure Franko's silver in the men's giant slalom event.

American skier Phil Mahre, runner-up in 1980, won the slalom event and saw his twin brother Steve secure the silver medal. In biathlon, Eirik Kvalfoss of Norway and Peter Angerer of West Germany won six medals between them, each securing a complete set. The Nordic countries displayed their strength in the cross-country skiing competition: from the 24 medals in dispute, 17 were won by athletes from Finland (8), Sweden (5), and Norway (4). Finnish skier Marja-Liisa Hämäläinen won four medals, including a gold medal sweep in the three individual cross-country distances, becoming the most successful athlete at these Games. In the men's section, Gunde Svan of Sweden also won four medals, though one less gold than Hämäläinen. Katarina Witt, a young figure skater from East Germany, narrowly defeated the reigning World champion, Rosalynn Sumners of the United States, to collect the first of two successive Olympic gold medals. The British ice dancing pair, Torvill and Dean, took the gold medal after giving performances that earned them not only the first-ever perfect scores (6.0) in Olympic ice dancing compulsories, but also a complete set of perfect artistic impression scores in the free program.

The Soviet Union dominated the ice hockey competition, winning every match to take their sixth Olympic gold in eight Winter Games. East German sledders fully demonstrated their prowess at the Trebević track. Wolfgang Hoppe and Dietmar Schauerhammer clinched gold in both bobsleigh events, while Bernhard Lehmann and Bogdan Musioł secured both silvers. Led by Steffi Martin, who won the first of her two back-to-back Olympic titles, East German lugers swept the women's singles medals. This show of strength was also observed in the women's speed skating, where East German athletes grabbed nine of the twelve medals in dispute. Four of these were won by Karin Enke (matching the total tallies of Hämäläinen and Svan), and three by Andrea Schöne – in direct competition with Enke. Speed skater Gaétan Boucher won three of Canada's four medals in Sarajevo, including two golds.

== Alpine skiing ==
| Event | Gold | Silver | Bronze |
|---|---|---|---|
| Men's downhill | Bill Johnson; United States | Peter Müller; Switzerland | Anton Steiner; Austria |
| Men's slalom | Phil Mahre; United States | Steve Mahre; United States | Didier Bouvet; France |
| Men's giant slalom | Max Julen; Switzerland | Jure Franko; Yugoslavia | Andreas Wenzel; Liechtenstein |
| Women's downhill | Michela Figini; Switzerland | Maria Walliser; Switzerland | Olga Charvátová; Czechoslovakia |
| Women's slalom | Paoletta Magoni; Italy | Perrine Pelen; France | Ursula Konzett; Liechtenstein |
| Women's giant slalom | Debbie Armstrong; United States | Christin Cooper; United States | Perrine Pelen; France |

== Biathlon ==
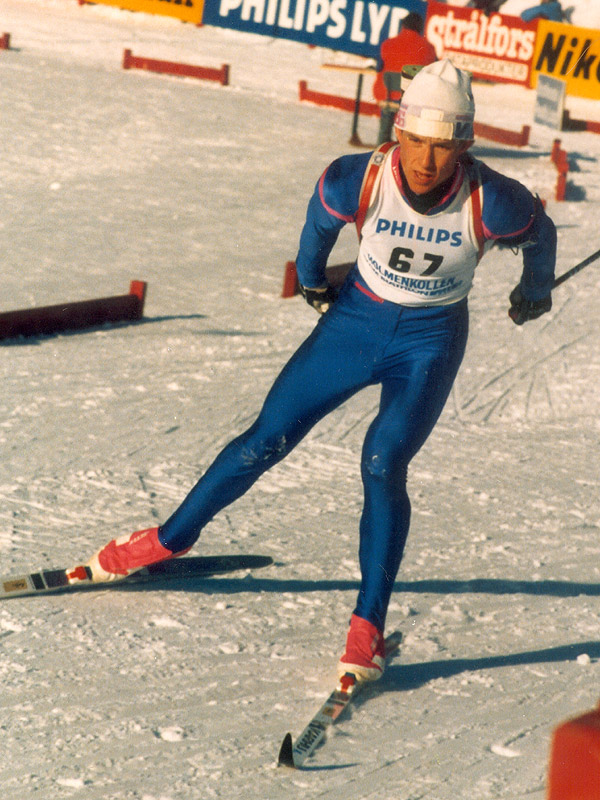
Eirik Kvalfoss of Norway won gold, silver and bronze in biathlon.

| Event | Gold | Silver | Bronze |
|---|---|---|---|
| Men's 10 km | Eirik Kvalfoss; Norway | Peter Angerer; West Germany | Matthias Jacob; East Germany |
| Men's 20 km | Peter Angerer; West Germany | Frank-Peter Roetsch; East Germany | Eirik Kvalfoss; Norway |
| Men's 4 × 7.5 km | Soviet Union; Dmitry Vasilyev; Juri Kashkarov; Algimantas Šalna; Sergei Bulygin | Norway; Odd Lirhus; Eirik Kvalfoss; Rolf Storsveen; Kjell Søbak | West Germany; Ernst Reiter; Walter Pichler; Peter Angerer; Fritz Fischer |

== Bobsleigh ==
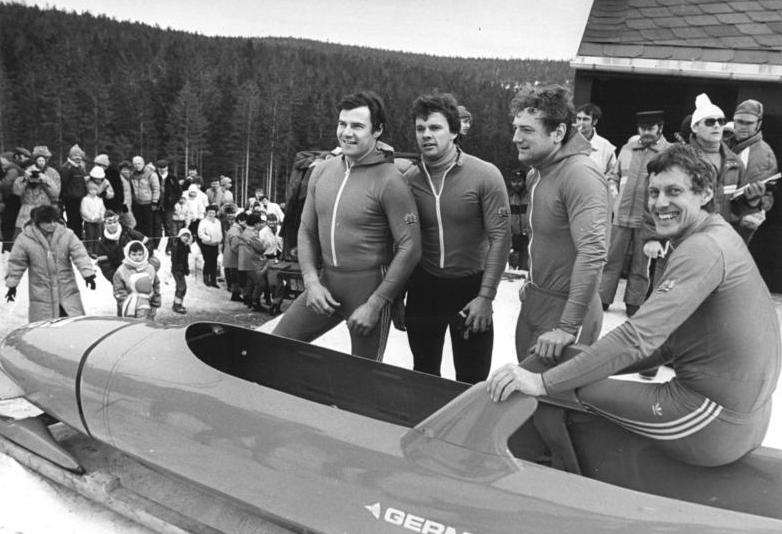
Hoppe, Musioł, Voge and Schauerhammer (left to right) contributed to East Germany's four medals in bobsleigh.

| Event | Gold | Silver | Bronze |
|---|---|---|---|
| Two-man | East Germany; Wolfgang Hoppe; Dietmar Schauerhammer | East Germany; Bernhard Lehmann; Bogdan Musioł | Soviet Union; Zintis Ekmanis; Vladimir Aleksandrov |
| Four-man | East Germany; Wolfgang Hoppe; Roland Wetzig; Dietmar Schauerhammer; Andreas Kirchner | East Germany; Bernhard Lehmann; Bogdan Musioł; Ingo Voge; Eberhard Weise | Switzerland; Silvio Giobellina; Heinz Stettler; Urs Salzmann; Rico Freiermuth |

== Cross-country skiing ==
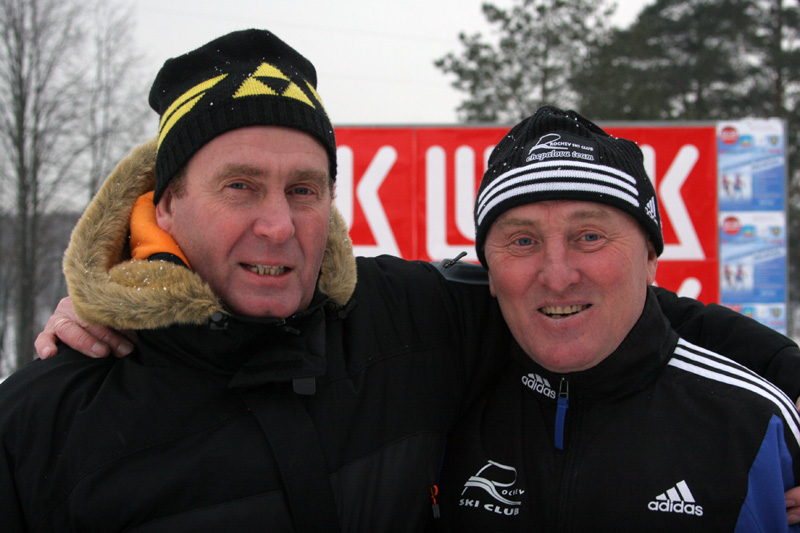
Cross-country skier Nikolay Zimyatov (left) gave the Soviet Union a gold medal in the 30 km and a silver medal in the team relay.

| Event | Gold | Silver | Bronze |
|---|---|---|---|
| Men's 15 km | Gunde Svan; Sweden | Aki Karvonen; Finland | Harri Kirvesniemi; Finland |
| Men's 30 km | Nikolay Zimyatov; Soviet Union | Alexander Zavyalov; Soviet Union | Gunde Svan; Sweden |
| Men's 50 km | Thomas Wassberg; Sweden | Gunde Svan; Sweden | Aki Karvonen; Finland |
| Men's 4 × 10 km | Sweden; Thomas Wassberg; Benny Kohlberg; Jan Ottosson; Gunde Svan | Soviet Union; Alexander Batyuk; Alexander Zavyalov; Vladimir Nikitin; Nikolay Zimyatov | Finland; Kari Ristanen; Juha Mieto; Harri Kirvesniemi; Aki Karvonen |
| Women's 5 km | Marja-Liisa Hämäläinen; Finland | Berit Aunli; Norway | Květa Jeriová; Czechoslovakia |
| Women's 10 km | Marja-Liisa Hämäläinen; Finland | Raisa Smetanina; Soviet Union | Britt Pettersen; Norway |
| Women's 20 km | Marja-Liisa Hämäläinen; Finland | Raisa Smetanina; Soviet Union | Anne Jahren; Norway |
| Women's 4 × 5 km | Norway; Inger Helene Nybråten; Anne Jahren; Britt Pettersen; Berit Aunli | Czechoslovakia; Dagmar Švubová; Blanka Paulů; Gabriela Svobodová; Květa Jeriová | Finland; Pirkko Määttä; Eija Hyytiäinen; Marjo Matikainen; Marja-Liisa Hämäläinen |

== Figure skating ==
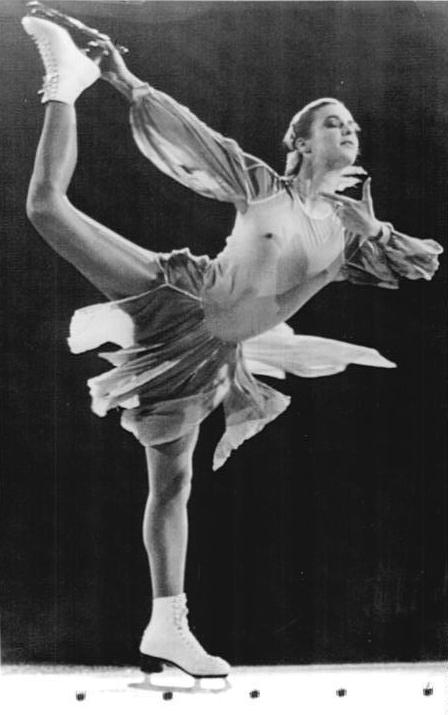
Katarina Witt won her first Olympic figure skating singles gold medal in Sarajevo.

| Event | Gold | Silver | Bronze |
|---|---|---|---|
| Men | Scott Hamilton; United States | Brian Orser; Canada | Jozef Sabovčík; Czechoslovakia |
| Ladies | Katarina Witt; East Germany | Rosalynn Sumners; United States | Kira Ivanova; Soviet Union |
| Pairs | Soviet Union; Elena Valova; Oleg Vasiliev | United States; Kitty Carruthers; Peter Carruthers | Soviet Union; Larisa Selezneva; Oleg Vitalyevich Makarov |
| Ice dancing | Great Britain; Jayne Torvill; Christopher Dean | Soviet Union; Natalia Bestemianova; Andrei Bukin | Soviet Union; Marina Klimova; Sergei Ponomarenko |

== Ice hockey ==
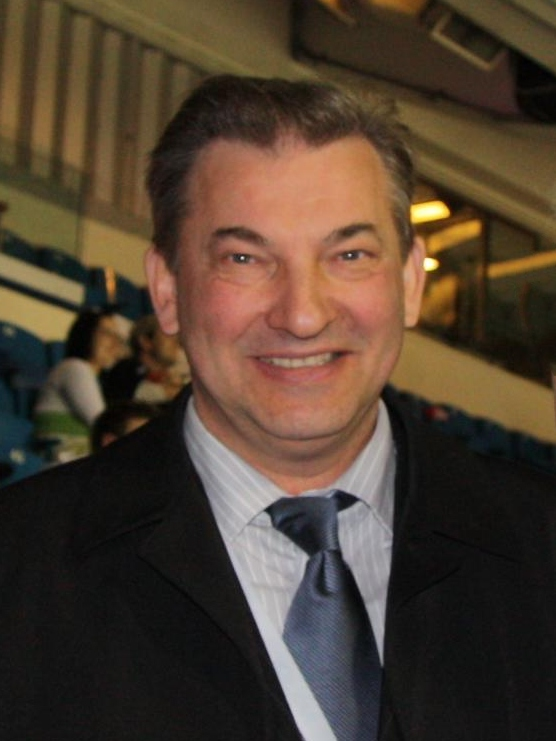
Vladislav Tretiak, the Soviet Union ice hockey goaltender, won his third Olympic gold and fourth and last Olympic medal in Sarajevo.

| Event | Gold | Silver | Bronze |
|---|---|---|---|
| Men's tournament | Soviet Union; Vladislav Tretiak; Zinetula Bilyaletdinov; Sergei Shepelev; Nikolai Drozdetsky; Viacheslav Fetisov; Aleksandr Geramisov; Alexei Kasatonov; Andrei Khomutov; Vladimir Kovin; Aleksandr Kozhevnikov; Vladimir Krutov; Igor Larionov; Sergei Makarov; Vladimir Myshkin; Vasili Pervukhin; Aleksandr Skvortsov; Sergei Starikov; Igor Stelnov; Viktor Tyumenev; Mikhail Vasiliev | Czechoslovakia; Milan Chalupa; Jaroslav Benák; Vladimír Caldr; František Černík; Miloslav Hořava; Jiří Hrdina; Arnold Kadlec; Jaroslav Korbela; Jiří Králík; Vladimír Kýhos; Jiří Lála; Igor Liba; Vincent Lukáč; Dušan Pašek; Pavel Richter; Dárius Rusnák; Vladimír Růžička; Jaromír Šindel; Radoslav Svoboda; Eduard Uvíra | Sweden; Thomas Åhlén; Per-Eric Eklund; Thom Eklund; Bo Ericsson; Håkan Eriksson; Peter Gradin; Mats Hessel; Michael Hjälm; Göran Lindblom; Tommy Mörth; Håkan Nordin; Rolf Ridderwall; Jens Öhling; Thomas Rundqvist; Tomas Sandström; Håkan Södergren; Mats Thelin; Michael Thelvén; Mats Waltin; Göte Wälitalo |

== Luge ==
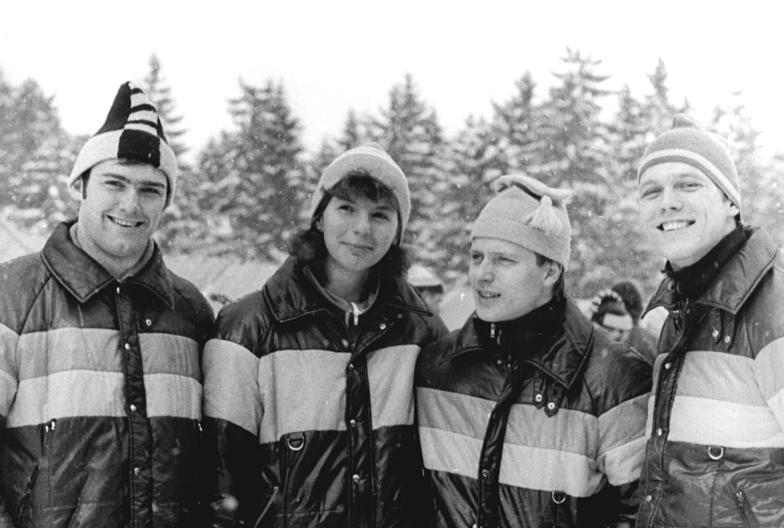
East Germany's Steffi Martin (second from left), Jörg Hoffmann (second from right) and Jochen Pietzsch (first from right) won the luge women's singles gold and doubles bronze medals, respectively.

| Event | Gold | Silver | Bronze |
|---|---|---|---|
| Men's singles | Paul Hildgartner; Italy | Sergey Danilin; Soviet Union | Valery Dudin; Soviet Union |
| Doubles | West Germany; Hans Stangassinger; Franz Wembacher | Soviet Union; Yevgeny Belousov; Aleksandr Belyakov | East Germany; Jörg Hoffmann; Jochen Pietzsch |
| Women's singles | Steffi Martin; East Germany | Bettina Schmidt; East Germany | Ute Weiss; East Germany |

== Nordic combined ==
| Event | Gold | Silver | Bronze |
|---|---|---|---|
| Men's individual | Tom Sandberg; Norway | Jouko Karjalainen; Finland | Jukka Ylipulli; Finland |

== Ski jumping ==
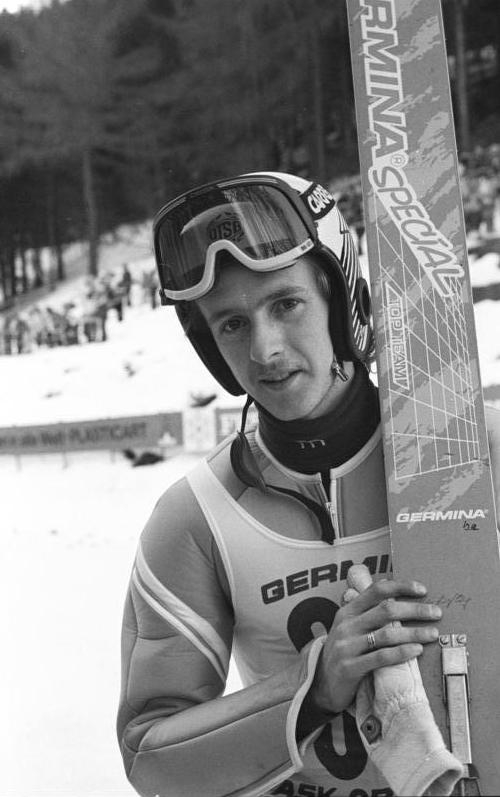
Ski jumper Jens Weißflog of East Germany won the normal hill event over Finland's Matti Nykänen, but could not outpass the Finnish in the large hill.

| Event | Gold | Silver | Bronze |
|---|---|---|---|
| Men's normal hill | Jens Weißflog; East Germany | Matti Nykänen; Finland | Jari Puikkonen; Finland |
| Men's large hill | Matti Nykänen; Finland | Jens Weißflog; East Germany | Pavel Ploc; Czechoslovakia |

== Speed skating ==
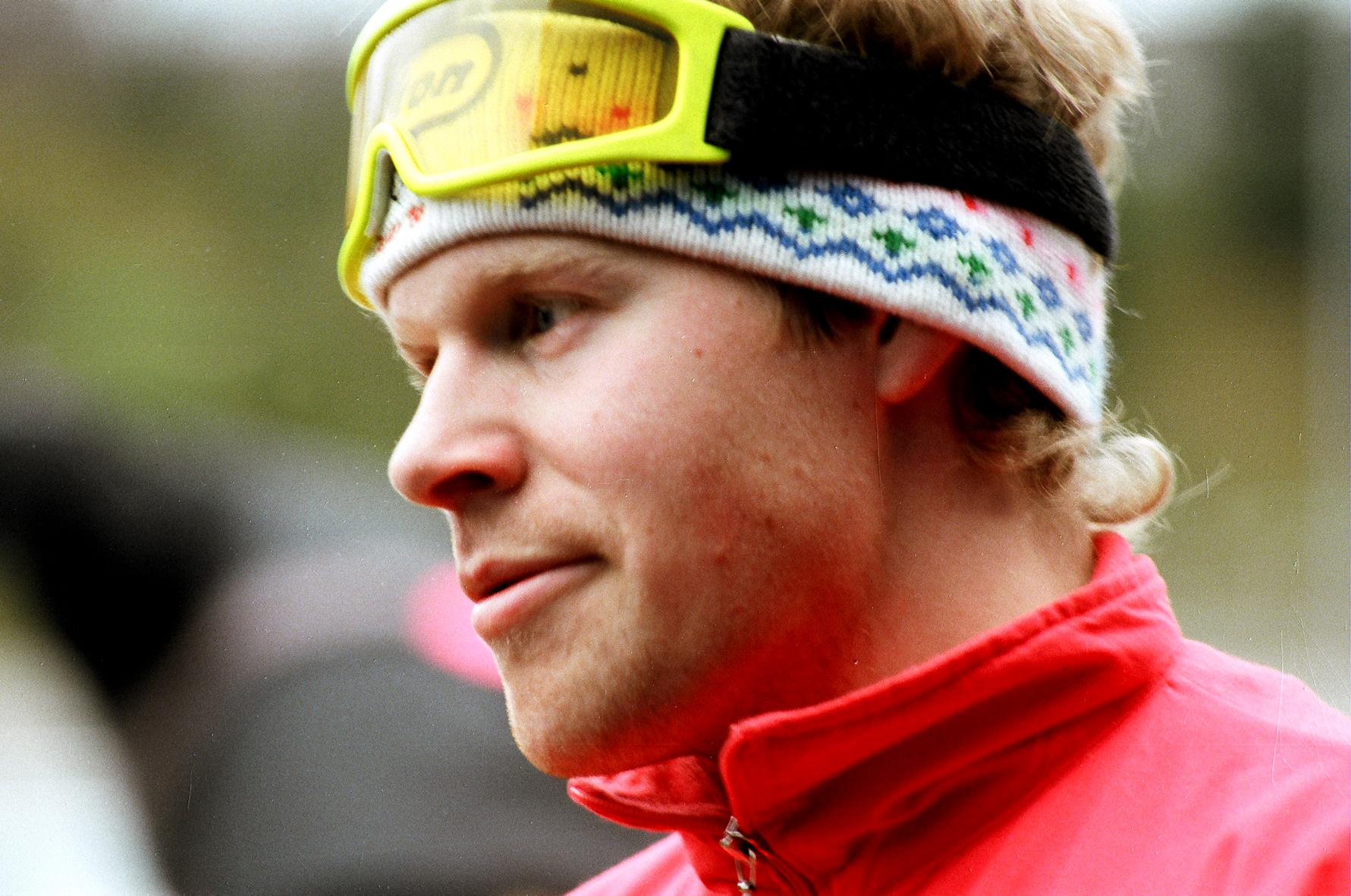
Tomas Gustafson clinched gold and silver in the men's 5,000 and 10,000 metres, to give Sweden its only speed skating medals at the 1984 Games.

| Event | Gold | Silver | Bronze |
|---|---|---|---|
| Men's 500 metres | Sergey Fokichev; Soviet Union | Yoshihiro Kitazawa; Japan | Gaétan Boucher; Canada |
| Men's 1,000 metres | Gaétan Boucher; Canada | Sergey Khlebnikov; Soviet Union | Kai Arne Engelstad; Norway |
| Men's 1,500 metres | Gaétan Boucher; Canada | Sergey Khlebnikov; Soviet Union | Oleg Bozhev; Soviet Union |
| Men's 5,000 metres | Tomas Gustafson; Sweden | Igor Malkov; Soviet Union | René Schöfisch; East Germany |
| Men's 10,000 metres | Igor Malkov; Soviet Union | Tomas Gustafson; Sweden | René Schöfisch; East Germany |
| Women's 500 metres | Christa Rothenburger; East Germany | Karin Enke; East Germany | Natalya Glebova; Soviet Union |
| Women's 1,000 metres | Karin Enke; East Germany | Andrea Schöne; East Germany | Natalya Petrusyova; Soviet Union |
| Women's 1,500 metres | Karin Enke; East Germany | Andrea Schöne; East Germany | Natalya Petrusyova; Soviet Union |
| Women's 3,000 metres | Andrea Schöne; East Germany | Karin Enke; East Germany | Gabi Schönbrunn; East Germany |

== Medal leaders ==
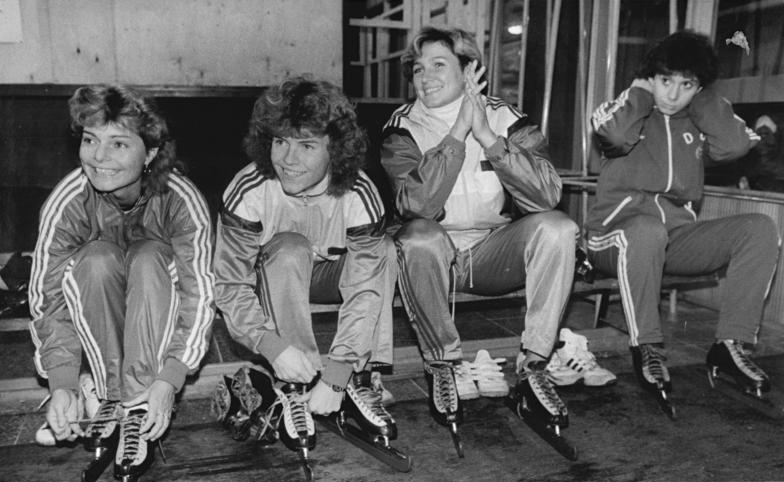
East Germany's speed skaters Andrea Schöne (first from left) and Karin Enke (second from right) stood among the most successful athletes at these Games.

Athletes that won at least two gold medals or at least three total medals are listed below.

| Athlete | Nation | Sport | Gold | Silver | Bronze | Total |
|---|---|---|---|---|---|---|
| Marja-Liisa Hämäläinen | Finland | Cross-country skiing | 3 | 0 | 1 | 4 |
| Karin Enke | East Germany | Speed skating | 2 | 2 | 0 | 4 |
| Gunde Svan | Sweden | Cross-country skiing | 2 | 1 | 1 | 4 |
| Gaétan Boucher | Canada | Speed skating | 2 | 0 | 1 | 3 |
| Andrea Schöne | East Germany | Speed skating | 1 | 2 | 0 | 3 |
| Peter Angerer | West Germany | Biathlon | 1 | 1 | 1 | 3 |
| Eirik Kvalfoss | Norway | Biathlon | 1 | 1 | 1 | 3 |
| Aki Karvonen | Finland | Cross-country skiing | 0 | 1 | 2 | 3 |
| Wolfgang Hoppe | East Germany | Bobsleigh | 2 | 0 | 0 | 2 |
| Dietmar Schauerhammer | East Germany | Bobsleigh | 2 | 0 | 0 | 2 |
| Thomas Wassberg | Sweden | Cross-country skiing | 2 | 0 | 0 | 2 |

== See also ==
- 1984 Winter Olympics medal table
