= Sweden at the 1984 Winter Olympics =

- IOC code: SWE
- NOC: Swedish Olympic Committee
- Website: www.sok.se (in Swedish and English)

in Sarajevo
- Competitors: 60 (51 men, 9 women) in 8 sports
- Flag bearer: Mats Waltin (ice hockey)
- Medals Ranked 5th: Gold 4 Silver 2 Bronze 2 Total 8

Winter Olympics appearances (overview)
- 1924; 1928; 1932; 1936; 1948; 1952; 1956; 1960; 1964; 1968; 1972; 1976; 1980; 1984; 1988; 1992; 1994; 1998; 2002; 2006; 2010; 2014; 2018; 2022; 2026

Sweden competed at the 1984 Winter Olympics in Sarajevo, Yugoslavia.

== Medalists ==
Medal	Name	Sport	Event
Gold	Gunde Svan	Cross-country skiing	Men's 15 km
Gold	Thomas Wassberg	Cross-country skiing	Men's 50 km
Gold	Thomas Wassberg; Gunde Svan; Jan Ottosson; Benny Kohlberg	Cross-country skiing	Men's 4 × 10 km relay
Gold	Tomas Gustafson	Speed skating	Men's 5000m
Silver	Gunde Svan	Cross-country skiing	Men's 50 km
Silver	Tomas Gustafson	Speed skating	Men's 10,000m
Bronze	Gunde Svan	Cross-country skiing	Men's 30 km
Bronze	Sweden men's national ice hockey team: Rolf Ridderwall; Göte Wälitalo; Michael Hjälm; Peter Gradin; Mats Hessel; Tomas Sandström; Thomas Rundqvist; Bo Ericson; Pelle Eklund; Michael Thelvén; Mats Thelin; Lars-Håkan Nordin; Göran Lindblom; Tommy Mörth; Jens Öhling; Håkan Södergren; Mats Waltin; Håkan Nordin; Thomas Åhlénd; Thom Eklund; Håkan Eriksson	Ice hockey	Men's competition

== Alpine skiing ==
Men

Athlete	Event	Race 1		Race 2		Total	
Athlete	Event	Time	Rank	Time	Rank	Time	Rank
Jörgen Sundqvist	Giant Slalom	DNF	–	–	–	DNF	–
Johan Wallner	Giant Slalom	DNF	–	–	–	DNF	–
Gunnar Neuriesser	Giant Slalom	1:23.99	21	1:24.46	23	2:48.45	22
Niklas Henning	Giant Slalom	1:23.61	19	1:22.51	17	2:46.12	18
Bengt Fjällberg	Slalom	53.31	14	DSQ	–	DSQ	–
Lars-Göran Halvarsson	Slalom	52.97	9	48.73	6	1:41.70	8
Stig Strand	Slalom	52.95	8	49.00	10	1:41.95	9
Jonas Nilsson	Slalom	51.52	2	48.73	6	1:40.25	4

- Ingemar Stenmark, a double gold medalist in 1980, was banned from these Olympics by the International Ski Federation (FIS) for accepting promotional payments directly, rather than through the Swedish ski federation.

== Biathlon ==
Men

Event	Athlete	Misses ^{1}	Time	Rank
10 km Sprint	Ronnie Adolfsson	4	33:27.0	25
10 km Sprint	Leif Andersson	3	33:21.9	24
10 km Sprint	Sven Fahlén	2	33:12.9	21

Event	Athlete	Time	Penalties	Adjusted time ^{2}	Rank
20 km	Ronnie Adolfsson	1'12:12.2	8	1'20:12.2	20
20 km	Sven Fahlén	1'12:10.8	6	1'18:10.8	11
20 km	Leif Andersson	1'13:19.3	3	1'16:19.3	8

Men's 4 x 7.5 km relay

Athletes	Race		
Athletes	Misses ^{1}	Time	Rank
Sven Fahlén; Tommy Höglund; Roger Westling; Ronnie Adolfsson	2	1'44:28.2	10

^{1} A penalty loop of 150 metres had to be skied per missed target.
^{2} One minute added per missed target.

== Bobsleigh ==
Sled	Athletes	Event	Run 1		Run 2		Run 3		Run 4		Total	
Sled	Athletes	Event	Time	Rank	Time	Rank	Time	Rank	Time	Rank	Time	Rank
SWE-1	Carl-Erik Eriksson; Nils Stefansson	Two-man	53.13	17	53.56	20	53.04	20	52.88	18	3:32.61	19

Sled	Athletes	Event	Run 1		Run 2		Run 3		Run 4		Total	
Sled	Athletes	Event	Time	Rank	Time	Rank	Time	Rank	Time	Rank	Time	Rank
SWE-1	Carl-Erik Eriksson; Tommy Johansson; Ulf Åkerblom; Nils Stefansson	Four-man	51.57	22	51.82	19	51.94	21	51.74	19	3:27.07	21

== Cross-country skiing ==
Men

Event	Athlete	Race	
Event	Athlete	Time	Rank
15 km	Torgny Mogren	43:39.4	22
15 km	Benny Kohlberg	43:21.5	19
15 km	Sven-Erik Danielsson	42:55.9	15
15 km	Gunde Svan	41:25.6	1st place, gold medalist(s)
30 km	Torgny Mogren	1'33:52.0	23
30 km	Jan Ottosson	1'33:01.3	16
30 km	Thomas Wassberg	1'32:25.3	14
30 km	Gunde Svan	1'29:35.7	3rd place, bronze medalist(s)
50 km	Anders Larsson	2'31:43.6	39
50 km	Jan Ottosson	2'22:24.0	14
50 km	Gunde Svan	2'16:00.7	2nd place, silver medalist(s)
50 km	Thomas Wassberg	2'15:55.8	1st place, gold medalist(s)

Men's 4 × 10 km relay

Athletes	Race	
Athletes	Time	Rank
Thomas Wassberg; Benny Kohlberg; Jan Ottosson; Gunde Svan	1'55:06.3	1st place, gold medalist(s)

Women

Event	Athlete	Race	
Event	Athlete	Time	Rank
5 km	Eva-Lena Karlsson	19:21.6	37
5 km	Ann Rosendahl	18:22.8	23
5 km	Karin Lamberg	18:02.5	16
5 km	Marie Risby	17:26.3	4
10 km	Stina Karlsson	34:52.4	31
10 km	Ann Rosendahl	34:28.0	21
10 km	Karin Lamberg	34:01.3	18
10 km	Marie Risby	32:34.6	6
20 km	Stina Karlsson	1'07:43.4	32
20 km	Kristina Hugosson	1'07:40.5	31
20 km	Ann Rosendahl	1'06:47.8	23
20 km	Marie Risby	1'03:31.8	5

Women's 4 × 5 km relay

Athletes	Race	
Athletes	Time	Rank
Karin Lamberg; Kristina Hugosson; Marie Risby; Ann Rosendahl	1'09:30.0	5

== Figure skating ==
Men

Athlete	CF	SP	FS	TFP	Rank
Lars Åkesson	13	15	18	31.8	17

Women

Athlete	CF	SP	FS	TFP	Rank
Catarina Lindgren	17	22	20	39.0	20

== Ice hockey ==
Summary

Team	Event	Group stage						Medal round / Placement match		
Team	Event	Opposition Score	Opposition Score	Opposition Score	Opposition Score	Opposition Score	Rank	Opposition Score	Opposition Score	Rank
Sweden men's	Men's tournament	Italy; W 11–3	Yugoslavia; W 11–0	West Germany; T 1–1	Poland; W 10–1	Soviet Union; L 1–10	2 Q	Czechoslovakia; L 0–2	Canada; W 2–0	3rd place, bronze medalist(s)

=== Group A ===
Top two teams (shaded ones) advanced to the medal round.

Team	Pld	W	L	T	GF	GA	Pts
Soviet Union	5	5	0	0	42	5	10
Sweden	5	3	1	1	34	15	7
West Germany	5	3	1	1	27	17	7
Poland	5	1	4	0	16	37	2
Italy	5	1	4	0	15	31	2
Yugoslavia	5	1	4	0	8	37	2

- Sweden 11-3 Italy
- Sweden 11-0 Yugoslavia
- Sweden 1-1 West Germany
- Sweden 10-1 Poland
- USSR 10-1 Sweden

=== Medal round ===
Team	Pld	W	L	T	GF	GA	Pts
Soviet Union	3	3	0	0	16	1	6
Czechoslovakia	3	2	1	0	6	2	4
Sweden (bronze)	3	1	2	0	3	12	2
Canada	3	0	3	0	0	10	0

- Czechoslovakia 2-0 Sweden
- Sweden 2-0 Canada

Carried over group match:

- USSR 10-1 Sweden

=== Leading scorers ===
Rk	Team	GP	G	A	Pts
2nd	Peter Gradin	6	9	4	13

- Team roster
- Rolf Ridderwall
- Göte Wälitalo
- Bo Ericson
- Göran Lindblom
- Håkan Nordin
- Mats Thelin
- Michael Thelvén
- Mats Waltin
- Thomas Åhlén
- Pelle Eklund
- Thom Eklund
- Håkan Eriksson
- Peter Gradin
- Mats Hessel
- Michael Hjälm
- Tommy Mörth
- Thomas Rundqvist
- Tomas Sandström
- Håkan Södergren
- Jens Öhling
- Head coach: Anders Parmström

== Luge ==
Men

Athlete	Run 1		Run 2		Run 3		Run 4		Total	
Athlete	Time	Rank	Time	Rank	Time	Rank	Time	Rank	Time	Rank
Fredrik Wickman	47.693	21	47.850	23	47.808	24	47.579	21	3:10.930	19

Women

Athlete	Run 1		Run 2		Run 3		Run 4		Total	
Athlete	Time	Rank	Time	Rank	Time	Rank	Time	Rank	Time	Rank
Lotta Dahlberg	42.986	12	43.327	18	42.859	15	43.181	19	2:52.353	16

== Speed skating ==
Men

Event	Athlete	Race	
Event	Athlete	Time	Rank
500 m	Hans Magnusson	1:03.08	42
500 m	Tomas Gustafson	41.18	36
500 m	Jan-Åke Carlberg	40.64	34
1000 m	Jan-Åke Carlberg	1:19.92	29
1000 m	Hans Magnusson	1:18.95	21
1500 m	Jan Junell	2:02.55	24
1500 m	Claes Bengtsson	2:02.04	18
1500 m	Hans Magnusson	2:01.26	16
5000 m	Jan Junell	7:29.98	18
5000 m	Claes Bengtsson	7:26.57	16
5000 m	Tomas Gustafson	7:12.28	1st place, gold medalist(s)
10,000 m	Claes Bengtsson	15:14.33	16
10,000 m	Jan Junell	15:12.90	15
10,000 m	Tomas Gustafson	14:39.95	2nd place, silver medalist(s)

Women

Event	Athlete	Race	
Event	Athlete	Time	Rank
500 m	Annette Carlén	43.65	18
1000 m	Annette Carlén	1:26.15	9
1500 m	Annette Carlén	2:10.80	12
3000 m	Annette Carlén	4:40.36	11
