= Anders Steen =

Swedish ice hockey player

- Born: April 28, 1955 (age 70) Nyköping, Sweden
- Height: 6 ft 1 in (185 cm)
- Weight: 204 lb (93 kg; 14 st 8 lb)
- Position: Centre
- Shot: Left
- Played for: SEL; Färjestads BK; NHL; Winnipeg Jets
- National team: Sweden
- NHL draft: Undrafted
- WHA draft: 152nd overall, 1975; Indianapolis Racers
- Playing career: 1970–1984

Anders Steen (born April 28, 1955) is a Swedish former professional ice hockey player who played 42 games in the National Hockey League. He played for the Winnipeg Jets. He is currently a scout for the Calgary Flames.

== Career statistics ==
=== Regular season and playoffs ===
			Regular season					Playoffs
Season	Team	League	GP	G	A	Pts	PIM	GP	G	A	Pts	PIM
1970–71	Nyköpings BIS	SWE-2	2	0	0	0	0	—	—	—	—	—
1971–72	Nyköpings BIS	SWE-2	17	10	4	14	—	—	—	—	—	—
1972–73	Nyköpings BIS	SWE-2	16	10	10	20	—	—	—	—	—	—
1973–74	Nyköpings BIS	SWE-2	12	10	5	15	—	—	—	—	—	—
1974–75	Färjestad BK	SWE	13	1	1	2	0	—	—	—	—	—
1975–76	Färjestad BK	SEL	32	21	7	28	8	—	—	—	—	—
1976–77	Färjestad BK	SEL	32	17	20	37	17	5	2	0	2	2
1977–78	Färjestad BK	SEL	35	22	12	34	35	—	—	—	—	—
1978–79	Färjestad BK	SEL	35	18	16	34	42	—	—	—	—	—
1979–80	Färjestad BK	SEL	36	29	16	45	46	—	—	—	—	—
1980–81	Winnipeg Jets	NHL	42	5	11	16	22	—	—	—	—	—
1980–81	Tulsa Oilers	CHL	21	11	14	25	28	7	0	4	4	10
1981–82	Färjestad BK	SEL	30	14	5	19	34	2	1	1	2	4
1982–83	Färjestad BK	SEL	23	9	9	18	20	4	0	1	1	2
1983–84	Färjestad BK	SEL	11	1	0	1	0	—	—	—	—	—
SEL totals			234	131	85	216	202	11	3	2	5	8
NHL totals			42	5	11	16	22	—	—	—	—	—

=== International ===
Year	Team	Event	GP	G	A	Pts	PIM
1974	Sweden	EJC	5	4	1	5	6
1975	Sweden	WJC	5	1	1	2	—
Junior totals			10	5	2	7	—
