= Peter Gustavsson =

Swedish ice hockey player (1958–2023)

- Born: 30 March 1958 Bollebygd, Sweden
- Died: 3 September 2023 (aged 65) Gothenburg, Sweden
- Height: 6 ft 1 in (185 cm)
- Weight: 188 lb (85 kg; 13 st 6 lb)
- Position: Left Wing
- Shot: Left
- Played for: Colorado Rockies
- NHL draft: Undrafted
- Playing career: 1977–1994

Peter Carl-Gustaf Gustavsson (30 March 1958 – 3 September 2023) was a Swedish ice hockey player. He played two games in the National Hockey League with the Colorado Rockies in the 1981–82 season. The rest of his career, which lasted from 1977 to 1994, was mainly spent with Västra Frölunda IF in Sweden. He died in September 2023, at the age of 65.

== Career statistics ==
=== Regular season and playoffs ===
			Regular season					Playoffs
Season	Team	League	GP	G	A	Pts	PIM	GP	G	A	Pts	PIM
1977–78	Västra Frölunda IF	SWE	16	1	5	6	0	—	—	—	—	—
1978–79	Västra Frölunda IF	SWE	35	2	1	3	2	—	—	—	—	—
1979–80	Västra Frölunda IF	SWE	36	13	8	21	12	8	2	1	3	0
1980–81	Västra Frölunda IF	SWE	34	13	15	28	19	2	0	1	1	4
1981–82	Colorado Rockies	NHL	2	0	0	0	0	—	—	—	—	—
1981–82	Fort Worth Texans	CHL	59	8	11	19	4	—	—	—	—	—
1982–83	Västra Frölunda IF	SWE	36	15	13	28	26	—	—	—	—	—
1983–84	Västra Frölunda IF	SWE	35	13	13	26	8	—	—	—	—	—
1984–85	Västra Frölunda IF	SWE-2	22	9	15	24	4	7	4	2	6	23
1985–86	Västra Frölunda IF	SWE-2	27	14	16	30	16	3	5	2	7	0
1986–87	Västra Frölunda IF	SWE-2	29	22	16	38	18	2	0	0	0	0
1987–88	Västra Frölunda IF	SWE-2	34	20	16	36	10	10	3	3	6	0
1988–89	Västra Frölunda IF	SWE-2	34	16	19	35	14	11	2	5	7	2
1989–90	Västra Frölunda IF	SWE	34	5	9	14	10	—	—	—	—	—
1990–91	Hanhals HF	SWE-2	30	14	12	26	18	—	—	—	—	—
1993–94	Härryda HC	SWE-2	29	13	25	38	6	—	—	—	—	—
SWE totals			226	62	64	126	77	10	2	2	4	4
NHL totals			2	0	0	0	0	—	—	—	—	—
