= Christer Kellgren =

Swedish ice hockey player

- Born: August 15, 1958 (age 68) Gothenburg, SWE
- Height: 6 ft 0 in (183 cm)
- Weight: 173 lb (78 kg; 12 st 5 lb)
- Position: Right wing
- Shot: Left
- Played for: Frölunda HC; Colorado Rockies
- NHL draft: Undrafted
- Playing career: 1977–1989

Christer Alfons Kellgren (born August 15, 1958 in Gothenburg, Sweden) is a retired Swedish professional ice hockey player. He played for Frölunda HC between 1977 and 1981, and again from 1982 to 1989, as well as five games in the National Hockey League for the Colorado Rockies during the 1981–82 season. He later served as Frölunda HC's director of hockey operations.

== Career statistics ==
=== Regular season and playoffs ===
			Regular season					Playoffs
Season	Team	League	GP	G	A	Pts	PIM	GP	G	A	Pts	PIM
1977–78	Västra Frölunda IF	SWE	3	0	0	0	0	—	—	—	—	—
1978–79	Västra Frölunda IF	SWE	14	1	0	1	0	—	—	—	—	—
1979–80	Västra Frölunda IF	SWE	27	4	4	8	2	8	1	4	5	2
1980–81	Västra Frölunda IF	SWE	36	20	10	30	20	2	1	0	1	4
1981–82	Colorado Rockies	NHL	5	0	0	0	0	—	—	—	—	—
1981–82	Fort Worth Texans	CHL	60	9	10	19	6	—	—	—	—	—
1982–83	Västra Frölunda IF	SWE	36	16	9	25	26	—	—	—	—	—
1983–84	Västra Frölunda IF	SWE	36	17	12	29	32	—	—	—	—	—
1984–85	Västra Frölunda IF	SWE-2	32	22	18	40	24	—	—	—	—	—
1985–86	Västra Frölunda IF	SWE-2	32	20	19	39	14	—	—	—	—	—
1986–87	Västra Frölunda IF	SWE-2	30	24	24	48	24	2	0	0	0	6
1987–88	Västra Frölunda IF	SWE-2	35	25	27	52	26	9	2	2	4	14
1988–89	Västra Frölunda IF	SWE-2	24	9	5	14	14	8	0	3	3	2
SWE totals			152	58	35	93	80	10	2	4	6	6
NHL totals			5	0	0	0	0	—	—	—	—	—
