= Ulf Isaksson =

Swedish ice hockey player

- Born: 19 March 1954 Norrsunda, Sweden
- Died: 25 December 2003 (aged 49)
- Height: 6 ft 1 in (185 cm)
- Weight: 185 lb (84 kg; 13 st 3 lb)
- Position: Left wing
- Shot: Left
- Played for: Los Angeles Kings; AIK IF
- NHL draft: 95th overall, 1982; Los Angeles Kings
- Playing career: 1971–1985

Ulf Erik Isaksson (19 March 1954 – 25 December 2003) was a Swedish ice hockey player who played one season for the Los Angeles Kings in 1982–83. The rest of his career, which lasted from 1971 to 1988, was mainly spent with AIK IF in Sweden. Internationally, Isaksson played for the Swedish national team at the 1981 and 1982 World Championships.

== Career statistics ==
=== Regular season and play-offs ===
			Regular season					Playoffs
Season	Team	League	GP	G	A	Pts	PIM	GP	G	A	Pts	PIM
1971–72	Rosersbergs IK	SWE-3	18	23	—	—	—	—	—	—	—	—
1972–73	Väsby IK HK	SWE-2	18	20	14	34	—	—	—	—	—	—
1973–74	AIK IF	SWE	22	5	3	8	6	—	—	—	—	—
1973–74	AIK IF	SWE	30	15	10	25	12	—	—	—	—	—
1975–76	AIK IF	SWE	36	11	7	18	6	—	—	—	—	—
1976–77	AIK IF	SWE	36	14	5	19	8	—	—	—	—	—
1977–78	AIK IF	SWE	34	11	7	18	16	6	3	2	5	2
1978–79	AIK IF	SWE	34	15	14	29	14	—	—	—	—	—
1979–80	AIK IF	SWE	36	9	11	20	12	—	—	—	—	—
1980–81	AIK IF	SWE	35	13	7	20	24	6	3	0	3	2
1981–82	AIK IF	SWE	24	9	7	16	16	7	5	2	7	4
1982–83	Los Angeles Kings	NHL	50	7	15	22	10	—	—	—	—	—
1982–83	New Haven Nighthawks	AHL	14	1	3	4	2	2	0	0	0	0
1983–84	AIK IF	SWE	36	11	11	22	12	6	3	2	5	6
1984–85	AIK IF	SWE	33	7	8	15	20	—	—	—	—	—
1985–86	RA 73	SWE-3	28	25	22	47	—	—	—	—	—	—
1986–87	RA 73	SWE-2	30	20	14	34	10	—	—	—	—	—
1987–88	RA 73	SWE-2	12	4	8	12	8	—	—	—	—	—
NHL totals			50	7	15	22	10	—	—	—	—	—
SWE totals			304	100	77	177	128	25	14	6	20	14

=== International ===
Year	Team	Event	GP	G	A	Pts	PIM
1981	Sweden	WC	5	0	1	1	4
1982	Sweden	WC	10	1	2	3	4
Senior totals			15	1	3	4	8
