= Roger Hägglund =

Swedish ice hockey player

- Born: 2 July 1961 Umeå, Sweden
- Died: 6 June 1992 (aged 30) Sörmjöle, Sweden
- Height: 6 ft 1 in (185 cm)
- Weight: 175 lb (79 kg; 12 st 7 lb)
- Position: Defence
- Shot: Left
- Played for: IF Björklöven; Västra Frölunda; Fredericton Express; Quebec Nordiques
- National team: Sweden
- NHL draft: 138th overall, 1980; St. Louis Blues
- Playing career: 1977–1992

Roger Hägglund (2 July 1961 – 6 June 1992) was a Swedish professional ice hockey defenceman who played three games for the Quebec Nordiques of the National Hockey League in 1984–85.

Hägglund was drafted 138th overall in the 1980 NHL entry draft by the St. Louis Blues.

He played 13 seasons in IF Björklöven in Umeå, both before and after his time in NHL, and participated in their winning the national championship in 1987.

Hägglund was killed in a car accident in Sweden in 1992. IF Björklöven retired number 23, worn by Hägglund, after the accident.

== Career statistics ==
=== Regular season and playoffs ===
			Regular season					Playoffs
Season	Team	League	GP	G	A	Pts	PIM	GP	G	A	Pts	PIM
1977–78	IF Björklöven J20	SWE-Jr	—	—	—	—	—	—	—	—	—	—
1977–78	IF Björklöven	SWE-2	9	0	2	2	12	—	—	—	—	—
1978–79	IF Björklöven J20	SWE-Jr	—	—	—	—	—	—	—	—	—	—
1978–79	IF Björklöven	SWE	25	2	3	5	23	—	—	—	—	—
1979–80	IF Björklöven J20	SWE-Jr	—	—	—	—	—	—	—	—	—	—
1979–80	IF Björklöven	SWE	7	3	8	11	28	3	0	0	0	4
1980–81	IF Björklöven J20	SWE-Jr	—	—	—	—	—	—	—	—	—	—
1980–81	IF Björklöven	SWE	27	1	7	8	21	—	—	—	—	—
1981–82	IF Björklöven	SWE	35	7	11	18	40	6	0	1	1	8
1982–83	IF Björklöven	SWE	34	6	12	18	64	3	0	0	0	0
1983–84	Västra Frölunda IF	SWE	27	8	7	15	10	—	—	—	—	—
1984–85	Quebec Nordiques	NHL	3	0	0	0	0	—	—	—	—	—
1984–85	Fredericton Express	AHL	34	0	5	5	6	—	—	—	—	—
1985–86	IF Björklöven	SWE	33	4	17	21	50	—	—	—	—	—
1986–87	IF Björklöven	SWE	28	3	15	18	36	6	1	2	3	8
1987–88	IF Björklöven	SWE	35	5	14	19	42	7	1	1	2	4
1988–89	IF Björklöven	SWE	16	1	7	8	40	—	—	—	—	—
1988–89	IF Björklöven	SWE-2	17	8	15	23	44	—	—	—	—	—
1989–90	IF Björklöven	SWE-2	30	7	39	46	48	—	—	—	—	—
1990–91	IF Björklöven	SWE-2	34	11	36	47	36	—	—	—	—	—
1991–92	IF Björklöven	SWE-2	34	13	28	41	60	—	—	—	—	—
SWE totals			267	40	101	141	354	25	2	4	6	24
NHL totals			3	0	0	0	0	—	—	—	—	—

=== International ===
Year	Team	Event	GP	G	A	Pts	PIM
1979	Sweden	EJC	5	2	2	4	18
1981	Sweden	WJC	5	3	4	7	6
1982	Sweden	WC	7	0	0	0	0
1983	Sweden	WC	7	0	3	3	4
Junior totals			10	5	6	11	24
Senior totals			14	0	3	3	4

== See also ==
- List of ice hockey players who died during their playing career
