= Tommy Mörth =

Swedish ice hockey player

Medal record

Representing Sweden

Men's Ice Hockey
Bronze medal – third place	1984 Sarajevo	Team

Tommy Jan Mörth (born July 16, 1959) is an ice hockey player who played for the Swedish national team. He won a bronze medal at the 1984 Winter Olympics.

== Career statistics ==
=== Regular season and playoffs ===
			Regular season					Playoffs
Season	Team	League	GP	G	A	Pts	PIM	GP	G	A	Pts	PIM
1976–77	Djurgårdens IF	SWE II	2	0	1	1	0	—	—	—	—	—
1977–78	Djurgårdens IF	SEL	7	0	2	2	4	—	—	—	—	—
1978–79	Djurgårdens IF	SEL	15	0	0	0	4	2	0	0	0	0
1979–80	Djurgårdens IF	SEL	22	1	2	3	0	—	—	—	—	—
1980–81	Djurgårdens IF	SEL	34	5	7	12	23	—	—	—	—	—
1981–82	Djurgårdens IF	SEL	35	12	13	25	10	—	—	—	—	—
1982–83	Djurgårdens IF	SEL	33	15	15	30	30	8	3	5	8	8
1983–84	Djurgårdens IF	SEL	34	17	14	31	54	6	1	1	2	8
1984–85	Djurgårdens IF	SEL	30	11	10	21	16	8	1	3	4	6
1985–86	Djurgårdens IF	SEL	29	18	8	26	28	—	—	—	—	—
1986–87	Djurgårdens IF	SEL	28	9	13	22	14	2	2	0	2	2
1987–88	Djurgårdens IF	SEL	17	2	4	6	4	—	—	—	—	—
1988–89	Malmö IF	SWE II	30	34	26	60	15	13	3	7	10	6
1989–90	Malmö IF	SWE II	33	20	30	50	32	2	2	0	2	0
1990–91	Järfälla HC	SWE III	22	14	13	27	14	—	—	—	—	—
1991–92	Järfälla HC	SWE III	18	15	10	25	10	—	—	—	—	—
SWE II totals			65	54	57	111	47	15	5	7	12	6
SEL totals			284	90	88	178	187	26	7	9	16	24

=== International ===
Year	Team	Event	GP	G	A	Pts	PIM
1977	Sweden	EJC	6	5	2	7	2
1979	Sweden	WJC	6	2	2	4	4
1982	Sweden	WC	10	1	1	2	0
1983	Sweden	WC	10	1	2	3	10
1984	Sweden	OG	6	1	2	3	2
Junior totals			12	7	4	11	6
Senior totals			26	3	5	8	12
