= Thomas Åhlén =

Swedish ice hockey player (born 1959)

Medal record

Representing Sweden

Men's Ice Hockey
Bronze medal – third place	1984 Sarajevo	Team

Thomas Valter Åhlén (born March 8, 1959) is an ice hockey player who played for the Swedish national team. He won a bronze medal at the 1984 Winter Olympics.

== Career statistics ==
=== Regular season and playoffs ===
			Regular season					Playoffs
Season	Team	League	GP	G	A	Pts	PIM	GP	G	A	Pts	PIM
1973–74	Hofors IK	SWE II
1974–75	Hofors IK	SWE II
1975–76	Hofors IK	SWE II
1976–77	Hofors IK	SWE II	21	4	6	10	—	—	—	—	—	—
1977–78	Leksands IF	SEL	9	1	1	2	4	—	—	—	—	—
1978–79	Leksands IF	SEL	8	0	0	0	0	—	—	—	—	—
1979–80	Skellefteå AIK	SEL	12	0	1	1	8	—	—	—	—	—
1980–81	Skellefteå AIK	SEL	11	0	2	2	10	—	—	—	—	—
1981–82	Skellefteå AIK	SEL	31	1	5	6	24	—	—	—	—	—
1982–83	Skellefteå AIK	SEL	33	9	11	20	32	—	—	—	—	—
1983–84	Skellefteå AIK	SEL	35	7	11	18	61	—	—	—	—	—
1984–85	Skellefteå AIK	SEL	36	7	11	18	55	—	—	—	—	—
1985–86	AIK	SEL	24	5	5	10	36	—	—	—	—	—
1986–87	AIK	SWE II	27	11	9	20	32	—	—	—	—	—
1987–88	AIK	SEL	40	6	18	24	60	5	0	0	0	2
1988–89	AIK	SEL	36	5	10	15	42	2	0	0	0	4
1989–90	AIK	SEL	34	2	4	6	39	3	0	1	1	0
1991–92	Trångsunds IF	SWE IV
SEL totals			309	43	79	122	371	10	0	1	1	6

=== International ===
Year	Team	Comp	GP	G	A	Pts	PIM
1977	Sweden	EJC	5	1	—	—	—
1984	Sweden	OG	7	3	1	4	4
1984	Sweden	CC	3	0	0	0	0
Senior totals			10	3	1	4	4
