= Peter Gradin =

Swedish ice hockey player

Medal record

Representing Sweden

Men's Ice Hockey
Bronze medal – third place	1984 Sarajevo	Team

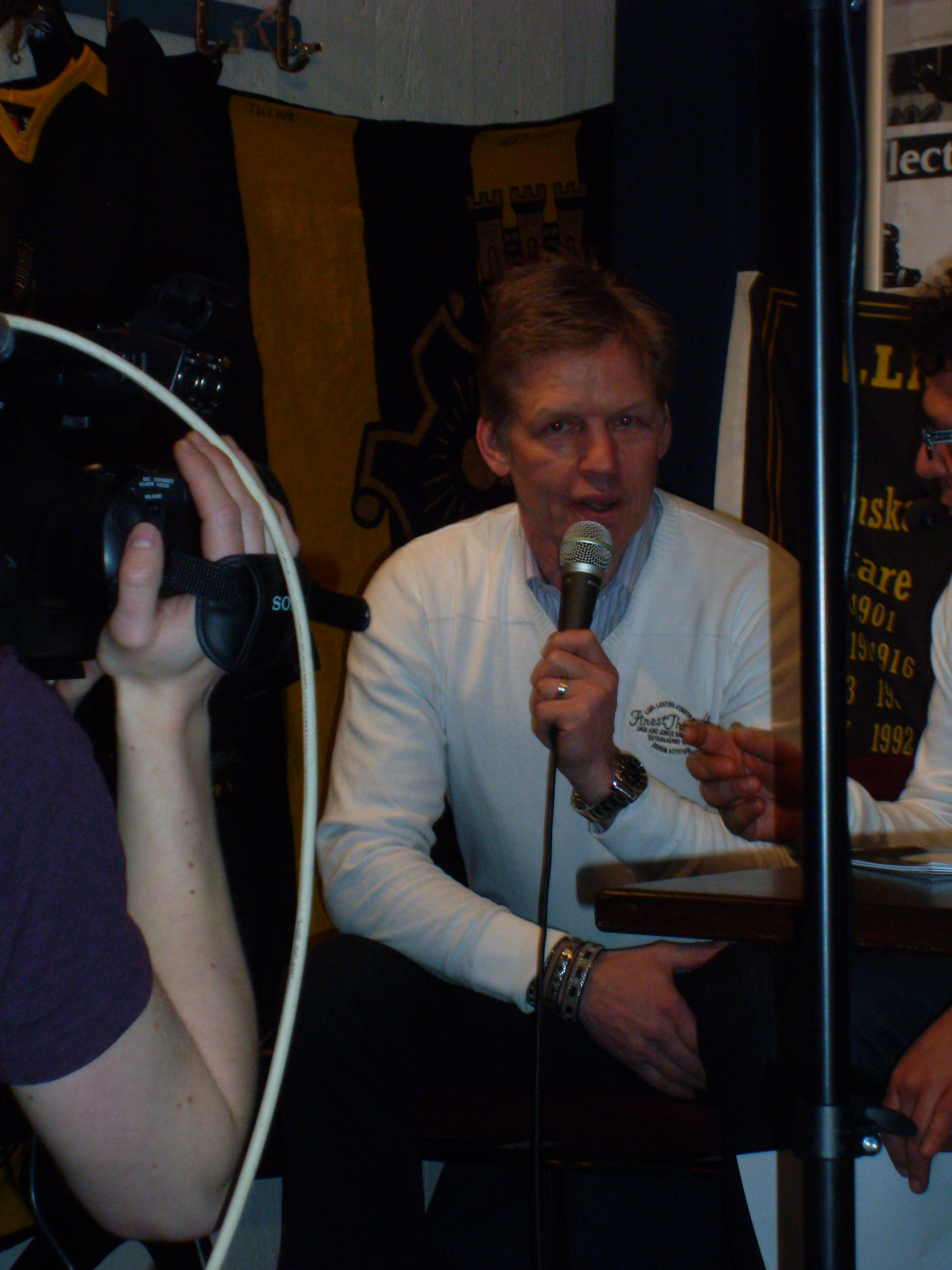
Peter Gradin

Peter Olof Gradin (born December 9, 1958) is an ice hockey player who played for the Swedish national team. He won a bronze medal at the 1984 Winter Olympics. He played his career mostly with AIK Ishockey and he won three Swedish championships for the team in 1978, 1982 and 1985. He also won a bronze medal for Sweden in the 1979 World Championships.

== Career statistics ==
=== Regular season and playoffs ===
			Regular season					Playoffs
Season	Team	League	GP	G	A	Pts	PIM	GP	G	A	Pts	PIM
1976–77	Modo AIK	SEL	6	0	2	2	2	2	2	0	2	2
1977–78	Modo AIK	SEL	19	3	2	5	2	—	—	—	—	—
1978–79	AIK	SEL	36	7	11	18	23	—	—	—	—	—
1979–80	AIK	SEL	25	6	8	14	16	—	—	—	—	—
1980–81	AIK	SEL	34	20	5	25	32	6	0	0	0	4
1981–82	AIK	SEL	36	17	8	25	26	7	0	2	2	2
1982–83	AIK	SEL	36	20	19	39	30	3	1	0	1	6
1983–84	AIK	SEL	35	19	9	28	44	6	4	3	7	2
1984–85	AIK	SEL	36	25	23	48	20	—	—	—	—	—
1985–86	AIK	SEL	36	19	11	30	36	—	—	—	—	—
1986–87	AIK	SWE II	29	23	30	53	18	—	—	—	—	—
1987–88	AIK	SEL	40	29	21	50	32	5	1	1	2	4
1988–89	AIK	SEL	32	12	22	34	30	2	1	0	1	0
1989–90	AIK	SEL	40	18	28	46	42	3	0	1	1	6
1990–91	AIK	SEL	40	12	19	31	30	—	—	—	—	—
1991–92	AIK	SEL	40	10	15	25	20	3	1	1	2	0
1997–98	AIK	SEL	1	0	0	0	2	—	—	—	—	—
SEL totals			492	217	201	418	387	37	10	8	18	26

=== International ===
Year	Team	Event	GP	G	A	Pts	PIM
1984	Sweden	OG	7	9	4	13	6
1985	Sweden	WC	9	3	1	4	6
Senior totals			16	12	5	17	12
