= Bo Ericson (ice hockey) =

Swedish ice hockey player

Medal record

Representing Sweden

Men's Ice Hockey
Bronze medal – third place	1984 Sarajevo	Team

Bo Ragnar Ericson (born January 23, 1958, in Stockholm, Sweden) is an ice hockey player who played for the Swedish national team. He won a bronze medal at the 1984 Winter Olympics.

== Career statistics ==
=== Regular season and playoffs ===
			Regular season					Playoffs
Season	Team	League	GP	G	A	Pts	PIM	GP	G	A	Pts	PIM
1974–75	AIK	SWE	4	0	0	0	0	—	—	—	—	—
1975–76	AIK	SEL	31	1	2	3	22	—	—	—	—	—
1976–77	AIK	SEL	35	3	9	12	23	—	—	—	—	—
1977–78	AIK	SEL	23	4	4	8	34	—	—	—	—	—
1978–79	AIK	SEL	35	5	3	8	20	—	—	—	—	—
1979–80	AIK	SEL	33	1	2	3	30	—	—	—	—	—
1980–81	AIK	SEL	36	10	4	14	46	6	0	1	1	10
1981–82	AIK	SEL	33	4	2	6	52	7	0	1	1	6
1982–83	AIK	SEL	31	1	8	9	37	3	0	0	0	4
1983–84	AIK	SEL	29	3	3	6	28	5	0	1	1	0
1984–85	Södertälje SK	SEL	32	2	6	8	34	8	1	3	4	8
1985–86	Södertälje SK	SEL	22	2	4	6	4	7	0	1	1	6
1986–87	Södertälje SK	SEL	35	5	6	11	24	—	—	—	—	—
1987–88	Södertälje SK	SEL	36	4	6	10	30	2	0	0	0	0
1988–89	Södertälje SK	SEL	29	4	0	4	16	5	0	3	3	2
SEL totals			440	49	59	108	400	43	1	10	11	42

=== International ===
Year	Team	Event	GP	G	A	Pts	PIM
1976	Sweden	EJC	5	3	1	4	4
1977	Sweden	WJC	7	0	3	3	6
1978	Sweden	WJC	7	0	3	3	10
1983	Sweden	WC	8	2	2	4	8
1984	Sweden	OG	6	1	1	2	8
1984	Sweden	CC	8	1	2	3	10
1985	Sweden	WC	10	1	1	2	10
Junior totals			19	3	7	10	20
Senior totals			32	5	6	11	36
