= Göran Lindblom =

Swedish ice hockey player

- Born: March 4, 1956 (age 69) Skellefteå, Sweden
- Height: 6 ft 0 in (183 cm)
- Weight: 187 lb (85 kg; 13 st 5 lb)
- Position: Defence
- Shot: Right
- Played for: Skellefteå AIK
- National team: Sweden
- NHL draft: 130th overall, 1976; St. Louis Blues
- WHA draft: 45th overall, 1976; Winnipeg Jets
- Playing career: 1975–1988

Göran Folke Lindblom (born March 4, 1956) is a retired Swedish ice hockey defenceman. Lindblom was the highest scoring Elitserien defenceman for three seasons (1977–78, 1978–79 and 1980–81) which is a record that he shares with Magnus Johansson.

== Career statistics ==
=== Regular season and playoffs ===
			Regular season					Playoffs
Season	Team	League	GP	G	A	Pts	PIM	GP	G	A	Pts	PIM
1972–73	Skellefteå AIK	SWE	6	0	1	1	0	—	—	—	—	—
1973–74	Skellefteå AIK	SWE II	19
1974–75	Skellefteå AIK	SWE	25	1	3	4	2	—	—	—	—	—
1975–76	Skellefteå AIK	SEL	34	6	10	16	6	3	0	0	0	2
1976–77	Skellefteå AIK	SEL	26	5	9	14	8	—	—	—	—	—
1977–78	Skellefteå AIK	SEL	35	12	22	34	14	5	5	4	9	2
1978–79	Skellefteå AIK	SEL	36	8	35	43	10	—	—	—	—	—
1979–80	Skellefteå AIK	SEL	36	4	12	16	20	—	—	—	—	—
1980–81	Skellefteå AIK	SEL	36	14	17	31	12	3	0	1	1	0
1981–82	Skellefteå AIK	SEL	33	4	17	21	12	—	—	—	—	—
1982–83	Skellefteå AIK	SEL	36	4	14	18	16	—	—	—	—	—
1983–84	Skellefteå AIK	SEL	36	5	14	19	12	—	—	—	—	—
1984–85	Skellefteå AIK	SEL	35	4	17	21	4	—	—	—	—	—
1985–86	Skellefteå HC	SWE II	31	11	30	41	10	—	—	—	—	—
1986–87	Skellefteå HC	SEL	36	3	15	18	10	—	—	—	—	—
1987–88	Skellefteå HC	SEL	21	3	12	15	2	—	—	—	—	—
1987–88	Skellefteå HC	Allsv	18	8	18	26	2	—	—	—	—	—
1988–89	Malå IF	SWE III	26	7	27	34		—	—	—	—	—
1989–90	Malå IF	SWE III	1	0	0	0	0	—	—	—	—	—
SEL totals			400	72	194	266	126	11	5	5	10	4

=== International ===
Year	Team	Event	GP	G	A	Pts	PIM
1974	Sweden	WJC	5	1
1976	Sweden	WJC	4	0	1	1	0
1978	Sweden	WC	10	1	0	1	0
1981	Sweden	WC	8	0	2	2	0
1982	Sweden	WC	10	0	1	1	0
1984	Sweden	OG	7	0	1	1	0
Senior totals			35	1	4	5	0

== International resume ==
Olympic medal record

Men's ice hockey

Representing Sweden
Bronze medal – third place	1984 Sarajevo	Team competition

- World Championships silver: 1981
- Olympic bronze: 1984
