= Håkan Eriksson (ice hockey) =

Swedish ice hockey player

- Born: 24 January 1956 (age 69)
- Height: 6 ft 0 in (183 cm)
- Weight: 190 lb (86 kg; 13 st 8 lb)
- Position: Centre
- Shot: Left
- Played for: Skellefteå AIK; Djurgårdens IF
- National team: Sweden
- Playing career: 1975–1987

Håkan Lars Elias Eriksson (born 24 January 1956) is a Swedish former ice hockey player.

== Playing career ==
Eriksson began playing hockey in Bjurfors IF but was acquired by Skellefteå AIK in 1974. He became Swedish champions with Skellefteå in 1978, and was a part of Sweden's 1979 World Championship team that won bronze. During the following season he was also part of Sweden's Olympic team in the 1980 Winter Olympics. After four seasons with Skellefteå, Eriksson moved to Stockholm and Djurgårdens IF. He won his second Swedish championship in 1983 with Djurgården. He was the team captain for two seasons, from 1982 to 1984, when he finished his career in Djurgården. During his final season in Djurgården he was again part of Sweden's Olympic team in the 1984 Winter Olympics. He became assistant coach in the same team along with Lars-Fredrik Nyström for the rest of the 1985–86 season when Gunnar Svensson was fired on 21 January 1986. He ended his playing career in 1987 after two seasons in IFK Lidingö.

Medal record

Men's ice hockey

Olympic Games
Bronze medal – third place	1980 Lake Placid	Team
Bronze medal – third place	1984 Sarajevo	Team

World Championships
Bronze medal – third place	1979	Team

Elitserien
Gold medal – first place	1978	Team
Gold medal – first place	1983	Team

== Career statistics ==
=== Regular season and playoffs ===
			Regular season					Playoffs
Season	Team	League	GP	G	A	Pts	PIM	GP	G	A	Pts	PIM
1974–75	Skellefteå AIK	SWE	4	0	1	1	2	—	—	—	—	—
1975–76	Skellefteå AIK	SEL	12	0	2	2	0	—	—	—	—	—
1976–77	Skellefteå AIK	SEL	33	3	6	9	34	—	—	—	—	—
1977–78	Skellefteå AIK	SEL	30	8	13	21	16	5	2	0	2	2
1978–79	Djurgårdens IF	SEL	32	12	9	21	30	6	1	2	3	4
1979–80	Djurgårdens IF	SEL	29	7	8	15	44	—	—	—	—	—
1981–82	Djurgårdens IF	SEL	36	7	9	16	34	—	—	—	—	—
1982–83	Djurgårdens IF	SEL	24	6	12	18	10	—	—	—	—	—
1983–84	Djurgårdens IF	SEL	32	7	10	17	24	5	1	0	1	2
1984–85	IFK Lidingö	SWE III	20	14	14	28	—	—	—	—	—	—
1985–86	IFK Lidingö	SWE III	16	13	10	23	—	—	—	—	—	—
1986–87	IFK Lidingö	SWE II	29	9	8	17	46	—	—	—	—	—
SEL totals			228	50	69	119	192	16	4	2	6	8

=== International ===
Year	Team	Event	GP	G	A	Pts	PIM
1979	Sweden	WC	5	0	0	0	2
1980	Sweden	OG	7	0	3	3	2
1984	Sweden	OG	7	0	3	3	2
Senior totals			19	0	6	6	6
