= Thomas Rundqvist =

- Born: 4 May 1960 (age 65) Vimmerby, Sweden
- Height: 6 ft 3 in (191 cm)
- Weight: 196 lb (89 kg; 14 st 0 lb)
- Position: Centre
- Shot: Left
- Played for: Färjestad BK; Montreal Canadiens; VEU Feldkirch
- National team: Sweden
- NHL draft: 198th overall, 1983; Montreal Canadiens
- Playing career: 1975–1998

Medal record

Representing Sweden

Ice hockey

European Junior Championships
Bronze medal – third place	1978 Finland	

World Junior Championships
Bronze medal – third place	1980 Finland	

World Championships
Gold medal – first place	1987 Austria	
Gold medal – first place	1991 Finland	
Silver medal – second place	1986 Soviet Union	
Silver medal – second place	1990 Switzerland	
Silver medal – second place	1993 Germany	

Olympic Games
Bronze medal – third place	1984 Sarajevo	
Bronze medal – third place	1988 Calgary	

Per Thomas Rundqvist (born 4 May 1960) is a retired Swedish professional ice hockey player and now sporting director of Färjestads BK.

Rundqvist started his senior ice hockey career in 1978 with the Swedish club Färjestads BK. He played with the club until 1984, when he crossed the Atlantic and signed with the Montreal Canadiens (who had drafted him in 1983 (10th round, 198th pick overall)). But Rundqvist played only two games with the Canadiens in the 1984–85 season, the rest of the year he played with Sherbrooke Canadiens in the AHL. So after only one year he went back to Sweden and Färjestad. He played six more season with them, but in 1993 he and his teammate in Färjestad Bengt-Åke Gustafsson signed for the Austrian team Feldkirch VEU. Rundqvist played there for five years and ended his career in 1998. Now (2006) he is working in the Färjestads BK's organisation.

Färjestads BK has retired Rundqvist's jersey number, #9.

Rundqvist was inducted into the IIHF Hall of Fame in 2007.

== Achievements ==
- Swedish Championship winner: 3 (1981, 1986, 1988)
- Austrian Championship winner: 5 (1994, 1995, 1996, 1997, 1998)
- World Championships winner: 2 (1987, 1991)
- World Championships second place: 3 (1986, 1990, 1993)
- Olympic bronze medal: 2 (1984, 1988)
- Canada Cup third place: 2 (1987, 1991)

== Career statistics ==
=== Regular season and playoffs ===
			Regular season					Playoffs
Season	Team	League	GP	G	A	Pts	PIM	GP	G	A	Pts	PIM
1975–76	Vimmerby IF	SWE III	14	6	0	6	—	—	—	—	—	—
1976–77	Vimmerby IF	SWE III	22	29	13	42	—	—	—	—	—	—
1977–78	Vimmerby IF	SWE III	—	—	—	—	—	—	—	—	—	—
1978–79	Färjestads BK	SEL	15	2	5	7	8	3	0	1	1	0
1979–80	Färjestads BK	SEL	36	9	6	15	28	—	—	—	—	—
1980–81	Färjestads BK	SEL	36	15	19	34	22	7	1	2	3	0
1981–82	Färjestads BK	SEL	36	14	13	27	30	2	0	1	1	2
1982–83	Färjestads BK	SEL	36	22	21	43	28	8	3	8	11	6
1983–84	Färjestads BK	SEL	36	13	22	35	38	—	—	—	—	—
1984–85	Montreal Canadiens	NHL	2	0	1	1	0	—	—	—	—	—
1984–85	Sherbrooke Canadiens	AHL	73	19	39	58	16	17	5	14	19	0
1985–86	Färjestads BK	SEL	32	9	17	26	27	8	2	4	6	2
1986–87	Färjestads BK	SEL	35	13	22	35	38	7	2	5	7	2
1987–88	Färjestads BK	SEL	40	15	22	37	40	9	3	7	10	6
1988–89	Färjestads BK	SEL	37	15	26	41	44	2	2	1	3	2
1989–90	Färjestads BK	SEL	40	16	29	45	30	10	8	4	12	0
1990–91	Färjestads BK	SEL	39	12	21	33	22	8	5	7	12	6
1991–92	Färjestads BK	SEL	39	10	28	38	54	6	3	2	5	8
1992–93	Färjestads BK	SEL	37	8	17	25	40	3	0	0	0	2
1993–94	Feldkirch VEU	Alp	27	9	20	29	10	—	—	—	—	—
1993–94	Feldkirch VEU	AUT	26	11	18	29	8	—	—	—	—	—
1994–95	Feldkirch VEU	AUT	28	9	15	24	32	8	2	3	5	6
1995–96	Feldkirch VEU	Alp	5	2	9	11	2	—	—	—	—	—
1995–96	Feldkirch VEU	AUT	34	13	30	43	33	—	—	—	—	—
1996–97	Feldkirch VEU	Alp	41	9	25	34	53	—	—	—	—	—
1996–97	Feldkirch VEU	AUT	11	2	9	11	8	—	—	—	—	—
1997–98	Feldkirch VEU	Alp	21	9	6	15	6	—	—	—	—	—
1997–98	Feldkirch VEU	AUT	27	2	16	18	8	—	—	—	—	—
SEL totals			494	173	268	441	449	73	29	42	71	36
Alp totals			94	26	63	89	71	—	—	—	—	—
AUT totals			126	37	88	125	89	8	2	3	5	6

=== International ===
Year	Team	Event	GP	G	A	Pts	PIM
1978	Sweden	EJC	5	3	2	5	2
1980	Sweden	WJC	5	1	2	3	6
1982	Sweden	WC	9	1	2	3	2
1983	Sweden	WC	10	1	3	4	2
1984	Sweden	OLY	7	3	1	4	6
1986	Sweden	WC	10	2	3	5	8
1987	Sweden	WC	10	1	2	3	4
1987	Sweden	CC	6	0	2	2	10
1988	Sweden	OLY	8	0	3	3	0
1989	Sweden	WC	9	1	2	3	6
1990	Sweden	WC	10	3	8	11	6
1991	Sweden	WC	10	6	4	10	4
1991	Sweden	CC	6	2	2	4	2
1992	Sweden	OLY	8	3	4	7	8
1993	Sweden	WC	8	1	4	5	0
Junior totals			10	4	4	8	8
Senior totals			111	24	40	64	58

Preceded by Rolf Ridderwall	Golden Puck; 1991	Succeeded by Tommy Sjödin
