= Mats Hessel =

Swedish ice hockey player

Medal record

Representing Sweden

Men's Ice Hockey
Bronze medal – third place	1984 Sarajevo	Team

Mats Gunnar Hessel (born 13 March 1961) is an ice hockey player who played for the Swedish national team. He won a bronze medal at the 1984 Winter Olympics. He played mostly for AIK in Stockholm and won two Swedish championships with them in 1982 and 1985.

== Career statistics ==
=== Regular season and playoffs ===
			Regular season					Playoffs
Season	Team	League	GP	G	A	Pts	PIM	GP	G	A	Pts	PIM
1978–79	AIK	SEL	5	1	0	1	2	—	—	—	—	—
1979–80	AIK	SEL	6	0	0	0	0	—	—	—	—	—
1980–81	AIK	SEL	5	0	0	0	4	—	—	—	—	—
1981–82	AIK	SEL	33	10	2	12	12	7	1	2	3	4
1982–83	AIK	SEL	29	11	10	21	28	3	2	0	2	4
1983–84	AIK	SEL	32	9	13	22	28	3	0	1	1	2
1984–85	AIK	SEL	30	2	7	9	32	—	—	—	—	—
1985–86	AIK	SEL	31	3	5	8	18	—	—	—	—	—
1986–87	AIK	SWE II	26	6	13	19	10	—	—	—	—	—
1987–88	AIK	SEL	31	7	5	12	38	5	1	2	3	2
1988–89	AIK	SEL	25	8	7	15	26	2	0	1	1	0
1989–90	Rögle BK	SWE II	16	2	5	7	22	—	—	—	—	—
SEL totals			227	51	49	100	188	20	4	6	10	12

=== International ===
Year	Team	Comp	GP	G	A	Pts	PIM
1979	Sweden	EJC	1	0	0	0	—
1984	Sweden	OG	7	1	1	2	2
