= Michael Thelvén =

Swedish ice hockey player

- Born: January 7, 1961 (age 65) Stockholm, Sweden
- Height: 5 ft 11 in (180 cm)
- Weight: 180 lb (82 kg; 12 st 12 lb)
- Position: Defence
- Shot: Right
- Played for: Djurgårdens IF; Boston Bruins
- NHL draft: 186th overall, 1980; Boston Bruins
- Playing career: 1981–1990

Arne Michael "Tellus" Thelvén (born January 7, 1961) is a Swedish former professional ice hockey defenceman who played 207 games in the National Hockey League for the Boston Bruins.

== Career statistics ==
=== Regular season and playoffs ===
			Regular season					Playoffs
Season	Team	League	GP	G	A	Pts	PIM	GP	G	A	Pts	PIM
1978–79	Djurgårdens IF	SEL	10	0	1	1	8	—	—	—	—	—
1980–81	Djurgårdens IF	SEL	28	2	4	6	38	—	—	—	—	—
1981–82	Djurgårdens IF	SEL	34	5	3	8	53	—	—	—	—	—
1982–83	Djurgårdens IF	SEL	30	3	14	17	50	7	1	2	3	12
1983–84	Djurgårdens IF	SEL	27	6	7	13	51	5	1	1	2	6
1984–85	Djurgårdens IF	SEL	33	8	13	21	54	8	0	2	2	2
1985–86	Boston Bruins	NHL	60	6	20	26	48	3	0	0	0	0
1986–87	Boston Bruins	NHL	34	5	15	20	18	—	—	—	—	—
1987–88	Boston Bruins	NHL	67	6	25	31	57	21	3	3	6	26
1988–89	Boston Bruins	NHL	40	3	18	21	71	10	1	7	8	8
1989–90	Boston Bruins	NHL	6	0	2	2	23	—	—	—	—	—
SEL totals			162	24	42	66	254	20	2	5	7	20
NHL totals			207	20	80	100	217	34	4	10	14	34

=== International ===
Year	Team	Event	GP	G	A	Pts	PIM
1979	Sweden	EJC	5	1	1	2	—
1981	Sweden	WJC	5	2	1	3	4
1984	Sweden	OG	3	1	3	4	4
1984	Sweden	CC	8	0	3	3	14
1985	Sweden	WC	10	0	2	2	10
1987	Sweden	CC	6	0	3	3	10
Senior totals			27	1	11	12	38
