= Fahlén =

Fahlén is a Swedish surname. Notable people with the surname include:

- Margareta Fahlén (1918–1978), Swedish actress
- Sven Fahlén (born 1959), Swedish biathlete
