= 1991 Men's Ice Hockey World Championships =

1991 edition of the Men's World Ice Hockey Championships

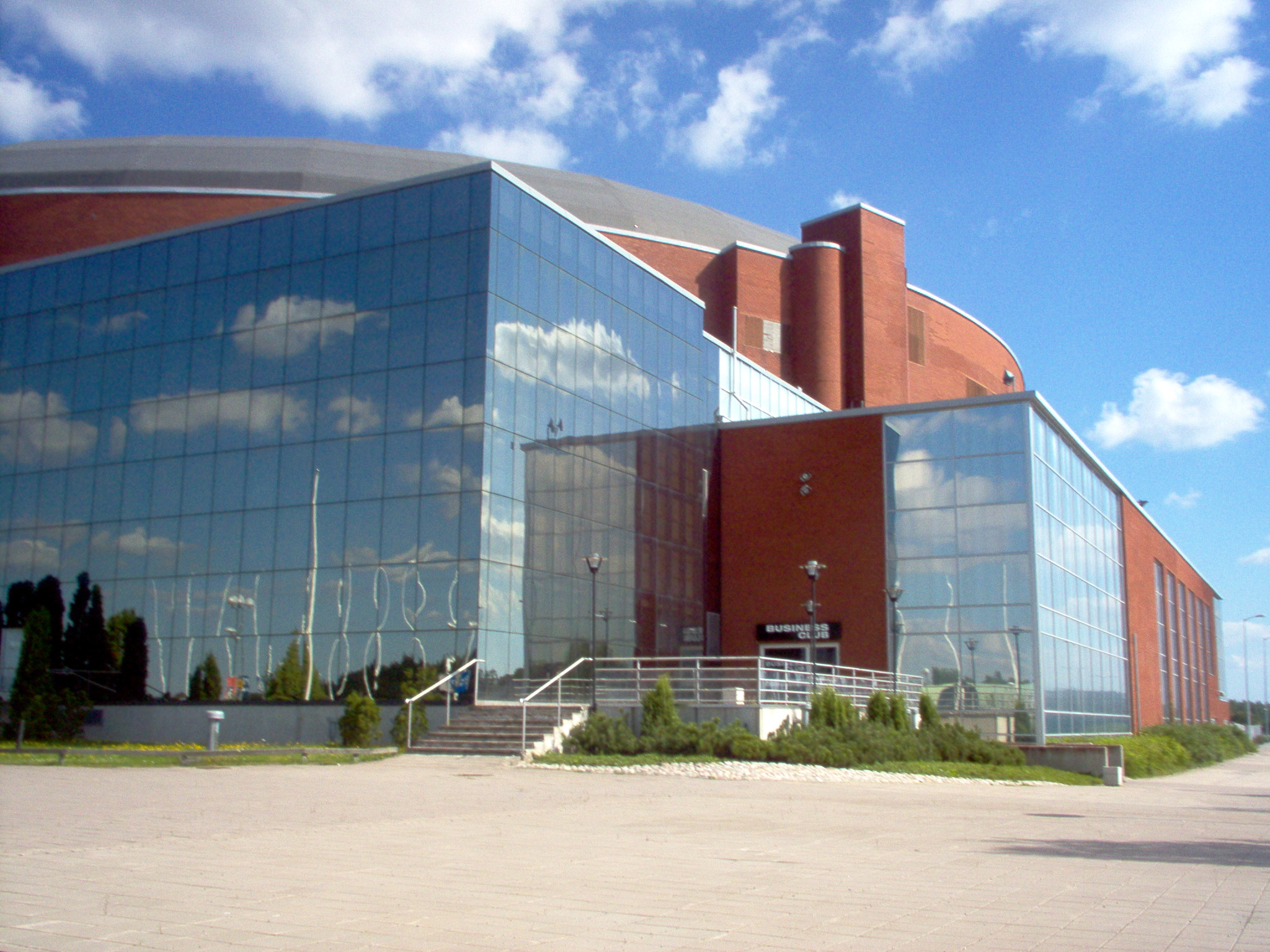
- The main venue of the 1991 World Ice Hockey Championships; Turkuhalli.

Tournament details
- Host country: Finland
- Venues: 3 (in 3 host cities)
- Dates: 19 April – 4 May
- Teams: 8

Final positions
- Champions: Sweden (5th title)
- Runners-up: Canada
- Third place: Soviet Union
- Fourth place: United States

Tournament statistics
- Games played: 40
- Goals scored: 272 (6.8 per game)
- Attendance: 310,627 (7,766 per game)
- Scoring leader: (Sweden) Mats Sundin 14 points

The 1991 Men's Ice Hockey World Championships was the 55th such event sanctioned by the International Ice Hockey Federation (IIHF), and at the same time served as the 66th and last Ice Hockey European Championships. Teams representing 25 countries participated in several levels of competition. The competition also served as qualifications for group placements in the 1992 competition.

The top Championship Group A tournament took place in Finland from 19 April to 4 May 1991, with games played in Turku, Helsinki and Tampere. Eight teams took part, with each team playing each other once. The four best teams then played each other once more. Sweden became world champions for the fifth time, and the Soviet Union won their 27th European title. In the European Championships, only matches between European teams in the first round were counted towards scoring.

There were three significant 'lasts' in this year's championships. This would be the last year that a separate European title would be awarded, which the Soviets captured in their last appearance before the dissolution of the Soviet Union seven months later. Their position in Group A would be inherited by Russia, while newly independent former Soviet member states Belarus, Estonia, Kazakhstan, Latvia, Lithuania, and Ukraine began play in 1993 in qualification tournaments for Group C. The tournament itself would change significantly after this year as well. This was the last time the top level was contested by eight teams; beginning in 1992 it would expand to twelve, requiring both Groups B and C to promote four nations each.

The final round of four teams was a very tight battle, except for the United States. Getting only a tie against the last place Germans, the Americans only advanced to the final round by narrowly defeating the host Finns. The USA were easily defeated by the three other teams in the final round, but were involved in a controversial finish. The Canadians, having tied both the Swedes and the Soviets, needed to win their game against the US by five goals, then hope that the Swedes and Soviets tied, ensuring Canada the gold. Winning 7–4 in the final minute, and despite playing short-handed, they scored the two goals they needed. American coach Tim Taylor, trailing 9–4, pulled his goalie in the final minute, later claiming that he was trying to score the necessary number of goals to win the bronze medal. It was the last of many questionable finishes over the years that hastened the IIHF to change the format of the tournament.

The Soviets and Swedes took a 1–1 tie into the third period of the last game, which would have given the gold medal to Canada had it held up. However, Mats Sundin scored at 9:37, and the Swedes held on to capture gold.

== World Championship Group A (Finland) ==
=== First round ===
Pos	Team	Pld	W	D	L	GF	GA	GD	Pts
1	Soviet Union	7	6	1	0	41	16	+25	13
2	Sweden	7	3	4	0	30	21	+9	10
3	Canada	7	4	1	2	24	20	+4	9
4	United States	7	3	2	2	23	28	−5	8
5	Finland	7	3	1	3	22	15	+7	7
6	Czechoslovakia	7	3	0	4	19	19	0	6
7	Switzerland	7	1	0	6	13	26	−13	2
8	Germany	7	0	1	6	13	40	−27	1

19 April	Finland	2–0	Czechoslovakia

19 April	Canada	4–3	United States

19 April	Soviet Union	3–1	Switzerland

19 April	Sweden	8–1	Germany

20 April	Canada	3–0	Switzerland

20 April	Finland	4–4	Sweden

20 April	Germany	3–7	Soviet Union

20 April	United States	4–1	Czechoslovakia

22 April	Canada	3–2	Germany

22 April	Finland	0–3	Soviet Union

22 April	Czechoslovakia	4–1	Switzerland

22 April	Sweden	4–4	United States

23 April	Germany	1–7	Czechoslovakia

23 April	Finland	3–5	Canada

23 April	Sweden	4–3	Switzerland

23 April	United States	2–12	Soviet Union

25 April	Sweden	2–1	Czechoslovakia

25 April	Switzerland	2–4	United States

25 April	Soviet Union	5–3	Canada

25 April	Finland	6–0	Germany

26 April	Canada	3–3	Sweden

26 April	Germany	4–4	United States

26 April	Czechoslovakia	2–6	Soviet Union

26 April	Finland	6–1	Switzerland

28 April	Finland	1–2	United States

28 April	Switzerland	5–2	Germany

28 April	Soviet Union	5–5	Sweden

28 April	Czechoslovakia	4–3	Canada

=== Final Round ===
Pos	Team	Pld	W	D	L	GF	GA	GD	Pts
1	Sweden	3	2	1	0	13	8	+5	5
2	Canada	3	1	2	0	15	10	+5	4
3	Soviet Union	3	1	1	1	10	9	+1	3
4	United States	3	0	0	3	12	23	−11	0

30 April	Soviet Union	6–4	United States

30 April	Sweden	3–3	Canada

2 May	United States	4–8	Sweden

2 May	Canada	3–3	Soviet Union

4 May	United States	4–9	Canada

4 May	Sweden	2–1	Soviet Union

=== Consolation round ===
Pos	Team	Pld	W	D	L	GF	GA	GD	Pts
5	Finland	10	6	1	3	35	21	+14	13
6	Czechoslovakia	10	4	0	6	28	27	+1	8
7	Switzerland	10	2	1	7	22	38	−16	5
8	Germany	10	0	2	8	19	51	−32	2

No team was relegated because of the expansion to twelve teams.

29 April	Germany	2–4	Finland

29 April	Switzerland	4–3	Czechoslovakia

1 May	Czechoslovakia	4–1	Germany

1 May	Finland	6–2	Switzerland

3 May	Finland	3–2	Czechoslovakia

3 May	Germany	3–3	Switzerland

== World Championship Group B (Yugoslavia) ==
Played in Ljubljana, Bled and Jesenice 28 March to 7 April. With the expansion of Group A impending, promotion was available to the top four finishers. As well, the top three qualified directly for the Olympics, with fourth place needing to defeat the winner of Group C.

Pos	Team	Pld	W	D	L	GF	GA	GD	Pts
9	Italy	7	7	0	0	49	11	+38	14
10	Norway	7	5	0	2	26	13	+13	10
11	France	7	5	0	2	28	18	+10	10
12	Poland	7	4	0	3	24	15	+9	8
13	Austria	7	3	1	3	21	18	+3	7
14	Yugoslavia	7	2	0	5	18	36	−18	4
15	Netherlands	7	1	0	6	9	40	−31	2
16	Japan	7	0	1	6	10	34	−24	1

Italy, Norway, France, and Poland all were promoted to Group A, no one was relegated.

28 March	Austria	2–2	Japan

28 March	France	4–2	Poland

28 March	Italy	13–0	Netherlands

28 March	Norway	5–1	Yugoslavia

29 March	Poland	2–1	Austria

29 March	Netherlands	0–4	Norway

29 March	France	4–2	Yugoslavia

29 March	Japan	2–7	Italy

31 March	France	9–1	Netherlands

31 March	Italy	2–1	Poland

31 March	Austria	6–1	Yugoslavia

31 March	Norway	6–1	Japan

1 April	Austria	6–4	Netherlands

1 April	Italy	13–3	Yugoslavia

2 April	Japan	3–5	France

2 April	Poland	2–4	Norway

3 April	Italy	5–1	Austria

3 April	Yugoslavia	3–6	Poland

4 April	Japan	1–2	Netherlands

4 April	France	2–3	Norway

5 April	Yugoslavia	5–1	Japan

5 April	France	1–5	Italy

6 April	Netherlands	1–4	Poland

6 April	Austria	3–1	Norway

7 April	Norway	3–4	Italy

7 April	Yugoslavia	3–1	Netherlands

7 April	Poland	7–0	Japan

7 April	Austria	2–3	France

== World Championship Group C (Denmark) ==
Played in Brøndby 23 March to 3 April. With the expansion of Group A, four openings in Group B were available. In addition, the winner got to play off for the last Olympic spot against the fourth place Group B finisher.

Pos	Team	Pld	W	D	L	GF	GA	GD	Pts
17	Denmark	8	7	1	0	71	13	+58	15
18	China	8	6	1	1	44	24	+20	13
19	Romania	8	6	0	2	51	22	+29	12
20	Bulgaria	8	4	1	3	35	26	+9	9
21	Great Britain	8	4	1	3	45	25	+20	9
22	Hungary	8	3	1	4	37	32	+5	7
23	North Korea	8	2	1	5	29	35	−6	5
24	South Korea	8	1	0	7	19	64	−45	2
25	Belgium	8	0	0	8	11	101	−90	0

Denmark, China, Romania and Bulgaria were all promoted. With no Group D in existence at this time, there was no relegation.

23 March	Hungary	11–1	Belgium

23 March	Denmark	15–1	South Korea

23 March	China	6–5	Great Britain

24 March	Romania	14–0	Belgium

24 March	Great Britain	7–2	North Korea

24 March	Bulgaria	3–4	China

25 March	South Korea	4–9	Hungary

25 March	Romania	7–2	North Korea

25 March	Denmark	7–3	Bulgaria

26 March	South Korea	7–2	Belgium

26 March	Hungary	3–4	China

26 March	Denmark	3–2	Great Britain

27 March	Bulgaria	1–3	Romania

27 March	Belgium	0–11	Great Britain

27 March	North Korea	2–3	China

28 March	Denmark	11–1	North Korea

28 March	Bulgaria	4–3	Hungary

28 March	Romania	11–3	South Korea

29 March	Denmark	17–1	Belgium

29 March	China	9–1	South Korea

29 March	Hungary	3–3	Great Britain

30 March	Belgium	0–12	North Korea

30 March	Great Britain	4–5	Bulgaria

30 March	Romania	3–1	China

31 March	Denmark	8–2	Romania

31 March	South Korea	2–4	Bulgaria

31 March	North Korea	2–6	Hungary

1 April	Denmark	8–1	Hungary

1 April	Great Britain	7–1	South Korea

1 April	Belgium	5–15	China

2 April	Romania	5–6	Great Britain

2 April	North Korea	1–1	Bulgaria

3 April	Romania	6–1	Hungary

3 April	Belgium	2–14	Bulgaria

3 April	South Korea	0–7	North Korea

3 April	Denmark	2–2	China

== Ranking and statistics ==
1991 IIHF World Championship winners

Sweden
5th title

=== Tournament Awards ===
- Best players selected by the directorate:
  - Best Goaltender: (Finland) Markus Ketterer
  - Best Defenceman: (Canada) Jamie Macoun
  - Best Forward: (Soviet Union) Valeri Kamensky
- Media All-Star Team:
  - Goaltender: (Canada) Sean Burke
  - Defence: (Soviet Union) Viacheslav Fetisov, (Soviet Union) Alexei Kasatonov
  - Forwards: (Soviet Union) Valeri Kamensky, (Finland) Jari Kurri, (Sweden) Thomas Rundqvist

=== Final standings ===
The final standings of the tournament according to IIHF:

1st place, gold medalist(s)	Sweden
2nd place, silver medalist(s)	Canada
3rd place, bronze medalist(s)	Soviet Union
4	United States
5	Finland
6	Czechoslovakia
7	Switzerland
8	Germany

=== European championships final standings ===
The final standings of the European championships according to IIHF:

Gold medal	Soviet Union
Silver medal	Sweden
Bronze medal	Finland
4	Czechoslovakia
5	Switzerland
6	Germany

=== Scoring leaders ===
List shows the top skaters sorted by points, then goals.

Player	GP	G	A	Pts	+/−	PIM	POS
(Sweden) Mats Sundin	10	7	5	12	+2	12	F
(Finland) Jari Kurri	10	6	6	12	+1	2	F
(Soviet Union) Valeri Kamensky	10	6	5	11	+8	10	F
(Canada) Joe Sakic	10	6	5	11	+6	0	F
(Finland) Teemu Selänne	10	6	5	11	+8	2	F
(United States) Jeremy Roenick	9	5	6	11	+4	8	F
(Finland) Mika Nieminen	10	5	6	11	+3	2	F
(Soviet Union) Pavel Bure	10	3	8	11	+5	2	F
(Finland) Christian Ruuttu	10	7	3	10	+3	10	F
(United States) Danton Cole	10	6	4	10	+1	14	F
(Sweden) Thomas Rundqvist	10	6	4	10	+2	4	F

=== Leading goaltenders ===
Only the top five goaltenders, based on save percentage, who have played 50% of their team's minutes are included in this list.

Player	MIP	GA	GAA	SVS%	SO
(Finland) Markus Ketterer	420	12	1.71	.939	2
(Canada) Sean Burke	479	21	2.63	.923	0
(Switzerland) Renato Tosio	420	27	3.86	.895	0
(Czechoslovakia) Petr Bříza	480	23	2.88	.893	0
(Sweden) Rolf Ridderwall	479	21	2.63	.892	0
