= Michael Hjälm =

Swedish ice hockey player

- Born: March 23, 1963 (age 63) Stockholm, SWE
- Height: 6 ft 1 in (185 cm)
- Weight: 183 lb (83 kg; 13 st 1 lb)
- Position: Left wing
- Shot: Left
- Played for: Modo Hockey; IF Björklöven; Rögle BK
- National team: Sweden
- NHL draft: 77th overall, 1982; Philadelphia Flyers
- Playing career: 1981–1996

Michael Peter Hjälm (born March 23, 1963) is an ice hockey player who played for the Swedish national team. He won a bronze medal at the 1984 and 1988 Winter Olympics. Drafted by the Philadelphia Flyers in the 1982 NHL entry draft, Hjälm spent his entire 15 season playing career in Sweden.

== Career statistics ==
=== Regular season and playoffs ===
			Regular season					Playoffs
Season	Team	League	GP	G	A	Pts	PIM	GP	G	A	Pts	PIM
1981–82	Modo AIK	SEL	27	3	3	6	2	2	0	1	1	6
1982–83	Modo AIK	SEL	36	13	24	37	20	—	—	—	—	—
1983–84	Modo AIK	SEL	35	17	26	43	24	—	—	—	—	—
1984–85	IF Björklöven	SEL	27	5	8	13	16	3	0	0	0	2
1985–86	IF Björklöven	SEL	35	14	23	37	28	—	—	—	—	—
1986–87	IF Björklöven	SEL	34	9	13	22	14	6	2	2	4	6
1987–88	Modo Hockey	SEL	38	13	19	32	18	4	2	0	2	4
1988–89	Modo Hockey	SEL	38	10	19	29	20	—	—	—	—	—
1989–90	Modo Hockey	SEL	18	9	13	22	20	—	—	—	—	—
1989–90	Modo Hockey	Allsv	17	7	12	19	10	7	1	8	9	2
1990–91	Modo Hockey	SEL	38	13	24	37	10	—	—	—	—	—
1991–92	Rögle BK	SWE II	29	21	22	43	20	—	—	—	—	—
1992–93	Rögle BK	SEL	39	13	13	26	34	—	—	—	—	—
1993–94	Rögle BK	SEL	37	12	16	28	10	3	0	1	1	2
1994–95	Rögle BK	SEL	22	4	6	10	8	—	—	—	—	—
1994–95	Rögle BK	Allsv	17	6	7	13	4	11	9	8	17	10
1995–96	Rögle BK	SEL	22	4	6	10	10	—	—	—	—	—
1995–96	Rögle BK	Allsv	13	5	7	12	8	11	1	4	5	10
SEL totals			446	139	213	352	234	18	4	4	8	20

=== International ===
Michael Hjälm
Medal record

Representing Sweden

Men's Ice Hockey
Bronze medal – third place	1984 Sarajevo	Team
Bronze medal – third place	1988 Calgary	Team

Year	Team	Event	GP	G	A	Pts	PIM
1981	Sweden	EJC	5	3	4	7	6
1982	Sweden	WJC	7	5	2	7	4
1983	Sweden	WJC	7	5	0	5	6
1984	Sweden	OG	7	1	1	2	6
1985	Sweden	WC	10	2	3	5	2
1986	Sweden	WC	10	1	3	4	8
1988	Sweden	OG	8	1	1	2	2
Junior totals			19	13	6	19	16
Senior totals			35	5	8	13	18
