= Thom Eklund =

Swedish ice hockey player

Medal record

Representing Sweden

Men's Ice Hockey
Bronze medal – third place	1984 Sarajevo	Team
Bronze medal – third place	1988 Calgary	Team

Thom Lennart Eklund (born October 28, 1958) is an ice hockey player who played for the Swedish national team. He won a bronze medal at the 1984 and 1988 Winter Olympics. He played for the clubs Södertälje SK, IF Björklöven, VIK Västerås HK and in Italy. He won the World Championship for Sweden in 1987 and a silver for Sweden at the World Championships in 1986 and he also won a Swedish title with Södertälje in 1985.

== Career statistics ==
=== Regular season and playoffs ===
			Regular season					Playoffs
Season	Team	League	GP	G	A	Pts	PIM	GP	G	A	Pts	PIM
1974–75	Enköpings IS	SWE IV	19	10	8	18	—	—	—	—	—	—
1977–78	Västerås IK	SWE II	36	11	6	17	32	—	—	—	—	—
1978–79	Västerås IK	SWE II	33	17	13	30	42	—	—	—	—	—
1979–80	Västerås IK	SWE II	35	20	6	26	42	—	—	—	—	—
1980–81	Västerås IK	SWE II	25	10	9	19	41	3	2	1	3	8
1981–82	IF Björklöven	SEL	13	1	2	3	8	7	1	2	3	8
1982–83	IF Björklöven	SEL	36	9	14	23	34	3	1	1	2	6
1983–84	IF Björklöven	SEL	33	6	7	13	40	3	0	0	0	4
1984–85	Södertälje SK	SEL	34	16	13	29	36	8	7	3	10	12
1985–86	Södertälje SK	SEL	34	19	10	29	48	7	3	1	4	10
1986–87	Södertälje SK	SEL	36	21	14	35	40	—	—	—	—	—
1987–88	Södertälje SK	SEL	40	17	15	32	46	2	0	0	0	0
1988–89	Södertälje SK	SEL	37	16	22	38	62	5	1	1	2	8
1989–90	Södertälje SK	SEL	38	13	14	27	40	2	0	1	1	2
1990–91	Södertälje SK	SEL	19	6	9	15	20	2	1	1	2	0
1991–92	Södertälje SK	SEL	18	1	3	4	16	—	—	—	—	—
1991–92	Södertälje SK	Allsv	17	4	5	9	10	8	2	1	3	10
SWE II totals			129	58	34	92	157	3	2	1	3	8
SEL totals			338	125	123	248	390	39	14	10	24	50

=== International ===
Year	Team	Event	GP	G	A	Pts	PIM
1983	Sweden	WC	10	1	0	1	4
1984	Sweden	OG	7	0	1	1	2
1986	Sweden	WC	10	2	3	5	14
1987	Sweden	WC	10	4	3	7	8
1987	Sweden	CC	6	1	2	3	6
1988	Sweden	OG	7	1	0	1	6
Senior totals			50	9	9	18	40
