= Mats Thelin =

Swedish ice hockey player

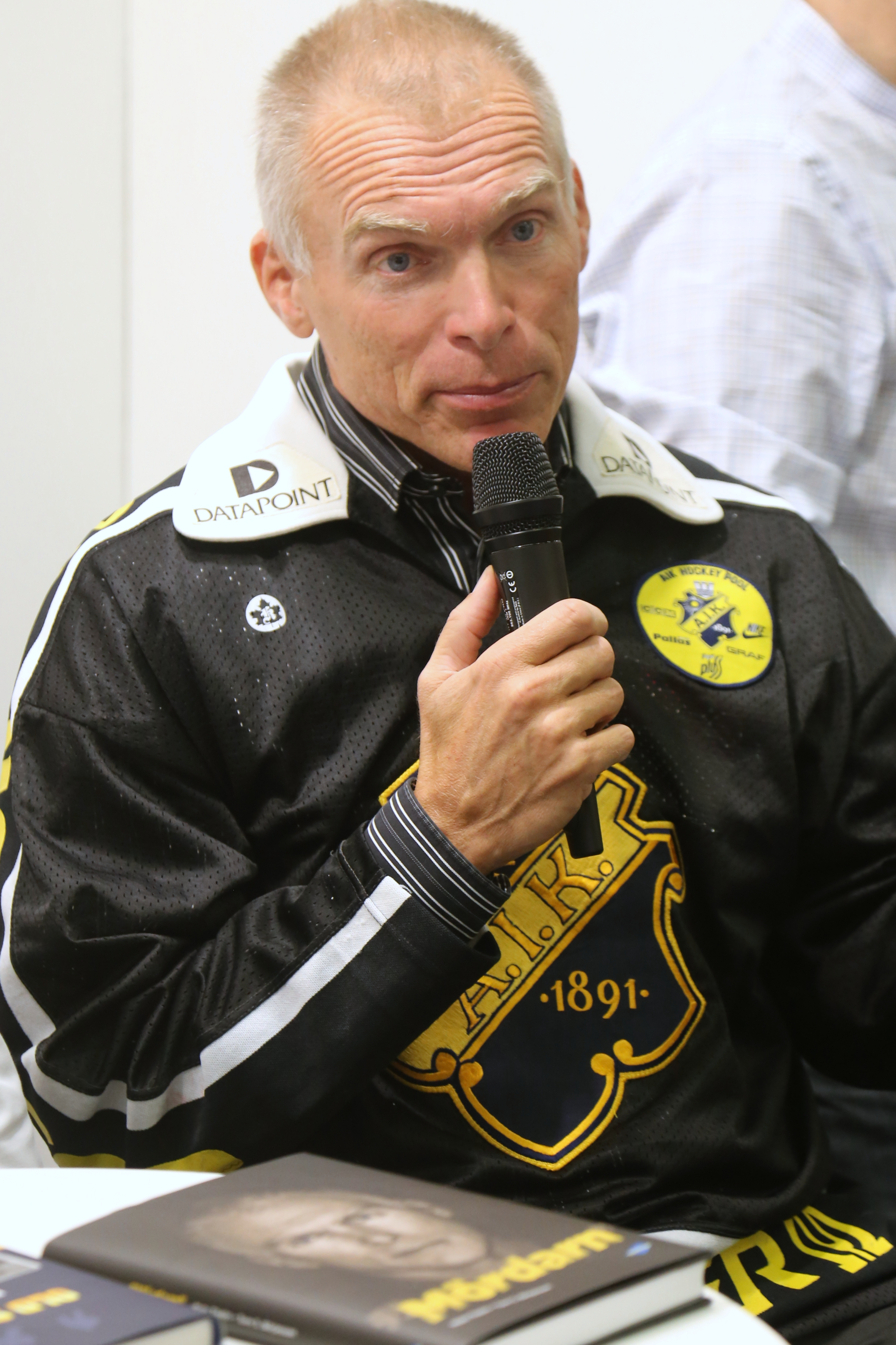
- Thelin at the Gothenburg Book Fair 2014
- Born: March 30, 1961 (age 65) Stockholm, Sweden
- Height: 5 ft 11 in (180 cm)
- Weight: 187 lb (85 kg; 13 st 5 lb)
- Position: Defence
- Shot: Left
- Played for: AIK IF; Boston Bruins
- National team: Sweden
- NHL draft: 140th overall, 1981; Boston Bruins
- Playing career: 1980–1994

Mats Gunnar "Mördaren" Thelin (born March 30, 1961, in Stockholm, Sweden) is a Swedish retired professional ice hockey defenceman who played 163 games in the National Hockey League (NHL) for the Boston Bruins.

== Career statistics ==
=== Regular season and playoffs ===
			Regular season					Playoffs
Season	Team	League	GP	G	A	Pts	PIM	GP	G	A	Pts	PIM
1980–81	AIK	SEL	10	0	0	0	4	5	0	0	0	4
1981–82	AIK	SEL	36	2	2	4	28	7	0	1	1	16
1982–83	AIK	SEL	28	6	4	10	50	3	1	1	2	4
1983–84	AIK	SEL	16	4	1	5	20	1	0	0	0	2
1984–85	Boston Bruins	NHL	73	5	13	18	78	5	0	0	0	6
1985–86	Boston Bruins	NHL	31	2	3	5	29	—	—	—	—	—
1985–86	Moncton Golden Flames	AHL	2	0	1	1	0	—	—	—	—	—
1986–87	Boston Bruins	NHL	59	1	3	4	69	—	—	—	—	—
1987–88	AIK	SEL	39	2	8	10	56	1	0	0	0	0
1988–89	AIK	SEL	38	6	16	22	62	2	0	2	2	0
1989–90	AIK	SEL	15	3	4	7	20	2	0	0	0	2
1990–91	AIK	SEL	37	1	3	4	54	—	—	—	—	—
1991–92	AIK	SEL	36	0	5	5	79	3	0	0	0	2
1992–93	AIK	SEL	22	0	3	3	22	—	—	—	—	—
1992–93	AIK	Allsv	3	0	0	0	4	—	—	—	—	—
1993–94	AIK	SWE II	38	9	8	17	46	9	0	2	2	12
SEL totals			277	24	46	70	395	24	1	4	5	30
NHL totals			163	8	19	27	176	5	0	0	0	6

=== International ===
Year	Team	Event	GP	G	A	Pts	PIM
1982	Sweden	WC	10	0	0	0	8
1983	Sweden	WC	5	0	3	3	4
1984	Sweden	OG	7	0	1	1	4
1984	Sweden	CC	8	1	3	4	14
Senior totals			30	1	7	8	30
