= Hugosson =

Hugosson is a surname. Notable people with the surname include:

- Doris Hugosson (born 1963), Swedish cross-country skier
- Mattias Hugosson (born 1974), Swedish footballer
