= 1978 Kvalserien =

Swedish ice hockey tournament

The 1978 Kvalserien was the fourth edition of the Kvalserien. It determined which two teams of the participating ones would play in the 1978–79 Elitserien season and which three teams would play in the 1978–79 Swedish Division 1 season.

== Tournament ==
	Club	GP	W	T	L	GF	GA	Pts
1.	Örebro IK	4	4	0	0	22	14	8
2.	IF Björklöven	4	2	0	2	18	15	4
3.	Huddinge IK	4	2	0	2	18	17	4
4.	Timrå IK	4	2	0	2	19	19	4
5.	IFK Kiruna	4	0	0	4	9	21	0
