= Håkan Nordin =

Swedish ice hockey player

Medal record

Representing Sweden

Men's Ice Hockey
Bronze medal – third place	1984 Sarajevo	Team

Leif Håkan Nordin (born January 15, 1961) is an ice hockey player who played for the Swedish national team. Nordin was drafted 36th overall in the 1981 NHL entry draft by the St. Louis Blues but never played in North America. He won a bronze medal at the 1984 Winter Olympics.

== Career statistics ==
=== Regular season and playoffs ===
			Regular season					Playoffs
Season	Team	League	GP	G	A	Pts	PIM	GP	G	A	Pts	PIM
1977–78	Mora IK	SWE II	2	0	0	0	0	—	—	—	—	—
1978–79	Mora IK	SWE II	24	4	13	17	6	—	—	—	—	—
1979–80	Mora IK	SWE II	27	3	20	23	20	—	—	—	—	—
1980–81	Färjestad BK	SEL	36	10	8	18	20	7	2	4	6	2
1981–82	Färjestad BK	SEL	36	8	9	17	20	2	0	0	0	4
1982–83	Färjestad BK	SEL	36	6	8	14	12	8	2	0	2	4
1983–84	Färjestad BK	SEL	36	5	17	22	28	—	—	—	—	—
1984–85	Färjestad BK	SEL	33	4	13	17	24	2	0	0	0	2
1985–86	Färjestad BK	SEL	36	3	16	19	30	8	3	3	6	4
1986–87	Färjestad BK	SEL	32	3	11	14	20	—	—	—	—	—
1987–88	Färjestad BK	SEL	40	9	18	27	30	9	2	4	6	4
1988–89	Västra Frölunda HC	SWE II	36	1	10	11	8	—	—	—	—	—
1989–90	Västra Frölunda HC	SEL	40	2	10	12	20	—	—	—	—	—
1990–91	Västra Frölunda HC	SEL	21	0	3	3	8	—	—	—	—	—
1990–91	Västra Frölunda HC	Allsv	18	1	5	6	6	—	—	—	—	—
1991–92	Västra Frölunda HC	SEL	33	0	4	4	6	3	0	0	0	2
1992–93	Arvika HC	SWE II	32	1	11	12	20	—	—	—	—	—
SWE II totals			121	9	54	63	54	—	—	—	—	—
SEL totals			379	50	117	167	218	39	9	11	20	22

=== International ===
Year	Team	Event	GP	G	A	Pts	PIM
1979	Sweden	EJC	5	0	2	2	—
1980	Sweden	WJC	5	2	0	2	0
1981	Sweden	WJC	5	2	7	9	0
1984	Sweden	OG	7	0	5	5	2
