= Sperotto =

Sperotto is an Italian surname. Notable people with the surname include:

- Germana Sperotto (born 1964), Italian cross-country skier
- Giannantonio Sperotto (born 1950), Italian footballer
- Maria Vittoria Sperotto (born 1996), Italian cyclist
- Nicolò Sperotto (born 1992), Italian footballer
