= Jaromír Šindel =

Czech ice hockey player (born 1959)

Medal record

Representing Czechoslovakia

Men's Ice Hockey
Silver medal – second place	1984 Sarajevo	Team

Jaromír Šindel (born November 30, 1959, in Ostrava, Czechoslovakia) is a former ice hockey player who played for the Czechoslovak national team. He won a silver medal at the 1984 Winter Olympics. His son Jakub Šindel is also an international in the sport.
