= Alexander Kozhevnikov (ice hockey) =

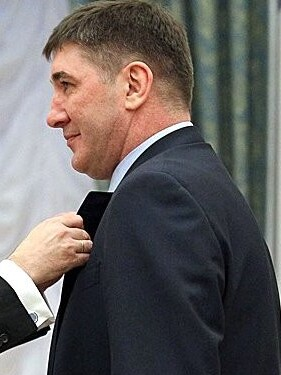
- Born: September 21, 1958 (age 68) Penza, Russian SFSR, USSR
- Height: 6 ft 3 in (191 cm)
- Weight: 194 lb (88 kg; 13 st 12 lb)
- Position: Left wing
- Shot: Left
- Played for: Dizelist Penza; HC Spartak Moscow; Krylya Sovetov Moscow; AIK IF; Durham Wasps; Kristall Elektrostal; SC Rapperswil-Jona Lakers
- National team: Soviet Union
- NHL draft: 227th overall, 1985; Calgary Flames
- Playing career: 1975–1997

Alexander Kozhevnikov
Medal record

Representing Soviet Union

Men's ice hockey

Olympic Games
| Gold medal – first place | 1984 Sarajevo | Ice hockey |
| Gold medal – first place | 1988 Calgary | Ice hockey |

World Championships
| Gold medal – first place | 1982 Finland | Ice hockey |
| Silver medal – second place | 1987 Austria | Ice hockey |

IIHF World Junior Championship
| Gold medal – first place | 1978 Canada | Ice hockey |

Aleksandr Viktorovich Kozhevnikov (Russian: Александр Викторович Кожевников; born September 21, 1958 in Penza) is a Russian retired ice hockey player who played in the Soviet Championship League. He played for Krylya Sovetov Moscow and HC Spartak Moscow.

He is a two-time Olympic gold medalist, in 1984 and 1988, and won the gold at the 1982 Ice Hockey World Championships. He was inducted into the Russian and Soviet Hockey Hall of Fame in 1982.

He has a daughter, Mariya Kozhevnikova.

== Career statistics ==
=== International ===
| Year | Team | Event | GP | G | A | Pts | PIM |
|---|---|---|---|---|---|---|---|
| 1978 | Soviet Union | WJC | 7 | 5 | 4 | 9 | 4 |
| 1982 | Soviet Union | WC | 10 | 6 | 1 | 7 | 2 |
| 1984 | Soviet Union | OG | 7 | 4 | 4 | 8 | 2 |
| 1984 | Soviet Union | CC | 5 | 0 | 1 | 1 | 0 |
| 1988 | Soviet Union | OG | 2 | 1 | 1 | 2 | 4 |
| Senior totals | | | 24 | 11 | 7 | 18 | 8 |

=== Regular season and playoffs ===
| | | | Regular season | | | | | Playoffs |
| Season | Team | League | GP | G | A | Pts | PIM | GP | G | A | Pts | PIM |
|---|---|---|---|---|---|---|---|---|---|---|---|---|
| 1975–76 | Dizel Penza | URS.2 | 7 | 0 | 0 | 0 | 0 | — | — | — | — | — |
| 1976–77 | Dizel Penza | URS.2 | 40 | 10 | 2 | 12 | 27 | — | — | — | — | — |
| 1977–78 | Spartak Moscow | URS | 31 | 7 | 8 | 15 | 28 | — | — | — | — | — |
| 1978–79 | Spartak Moscow | URS | 42 | 11 | 16 | 27 | 52 | — | — | — | — | — |
| 1979–80 | Spartak Moscow | URS | 44 | 14 | 14 | 28 | 48 | — | — | — | — | — |
| 1980–81 | Spartak Moscow | URS | 49 | 16 | 16 | 32 | 34 | — | — | — | — | — |
| 1981–82 | Spartak Moscow | URS | 47 | 43 | 28 | 71 | 38 | — | — | — | — | — |
| 1982–83 | Spartak Moscow | URS | 43 | 35 | 22 | 57 | 16 | — | — | — | — | — |
| 1983–84 | Spartak Moscow | URS | 33 | 33 | 14 | 47 | 26 | — | — | — | — | — |
| 1984–85 | Spartak Moscow | URS | 41 | 18 | 10 | 28 | 34 | — | — | — | — | — |
| 1985–86 | Spartak Moscow | URS | 36 | 14 | 13 | 27 | 21 | — | — | — | — | — |
| 1986–87 | Krylia Sovetov Moscow | URS | 40 | 8 | 9 | 17 | 22 | — | — | — | — | — |
| 1987–88 | Krylia Sovetov Moscow | URS | 47 | 25 | 20 | 45 | 30 | — | — | — | — | — |
| 1988–89 | Krylia Sovetov Moscow | URS | 33 | 8 | 4 | 12 | 22 | — | — | — | — | — |
| 1989–90 | AIK | SEL | 16 | 5 | 9 | 14 | 6 | — | — | — | — | — |
| 1989–90 | Durham Wasps | GBR | 11 | 25 | 22 | 47 | 20 | 4 | 8 | 1 | 9 | 2 |
| 1990–91 | Krylia Sovetov Moscow | URS | 4 | 0 | 0 | 0 | 2 | — | — | — | — | — |
| 1990–91 | Kristall Elektrostal | URS.2 | 10 | 3 | 0 | 3 | 0 | — | — | — | — | — |
| 1990–91 | SC Rapperswil–Jona | SUI.2 | 7 | 8 | 3 | 11 | 4 | 7 | 9 | 9 | 18 | 2 |
| 1991–92 | SC Rapperswil–Jona | SUI.2 | 11 | 12 | 9 | 21 | 12 | — | — | — | — | — |
| 1995–96 | Krylia Sovetov Moscow | IHL | 23 | 8 | 12 | 20 | 16 | — | — | — | — | — |
| 1996–97 | Krylia Sovetov Moscow | RSL | 12 | 3 | 6 | 9 | 6 | — | — | — | — | — |
| USSR totals | | | 490 | 232 | 174 | 406 | 373 | — | — | — | — | — |
