= Claes Bengtsson =

Swedish speed skater

Personal information
- Nationality: Swedish
- Born: 12 October 1959 (age 65); Sala, Sweden

Sport
- Sport: Speed skating

Claes Bengtsson (born 12 October 1959) is a Swedish speed skater. He competed at the 1984 Winter Olympics and the 1988 Winter Olympics.
