= Ice hockey at the 1984 Winter Olympics =

Tournament details
- Host country: Yugoslavia
- Venue(s): Olympic Hall Zetra, Skenderija Olympic Hall (in 1 host city)
- Dates: 7–19 February
- Teams: 12

Final positions
- Champions: Soviet Union (6th title)
- Runners-up: Czechoslovakia
- Third place: Sweden
- Fourth place: Canada

Tournament statistics
- Games played: 36
- Goals scored: 305 (8.47 per game)
- Scoring leader: (Germany) Erich Kuhnhackl (14 points)

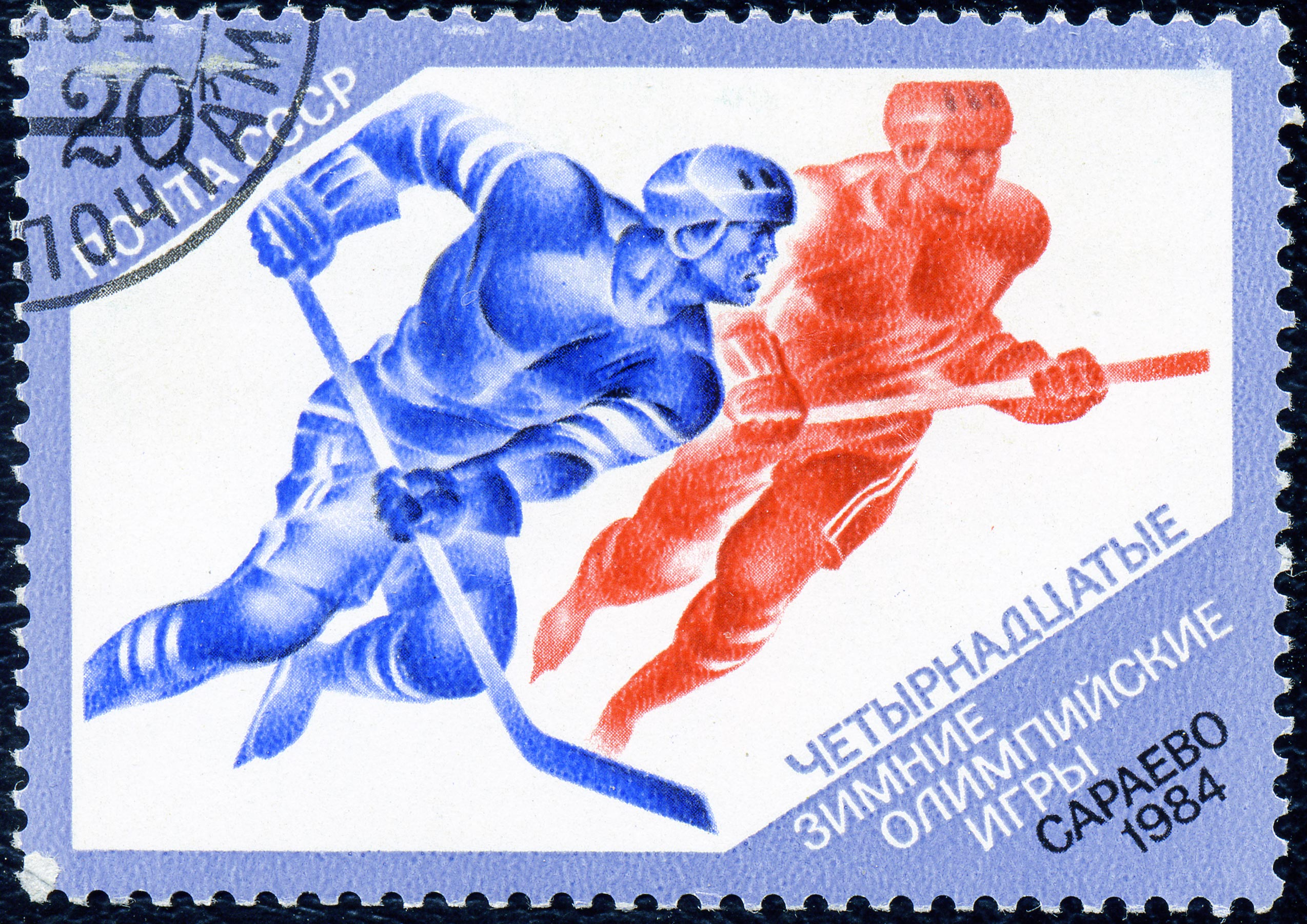
Soviet stamp for the 1984 Winter Olympics

The men's ice hockey tournament at the 1984 Winter Olympics in Sarajevo, Yugoslavia, was the 15th Olympic Championship. The Soviet Union won its sixth gold medal. Games were held mostly in the arena portion of the Olympic Hall Zetra, with some played in the arena portion of the Skenderija Olympic Hall.

The IIHF did not run a championship in Olympic years at this time. Nations that did not participate in the Sarajevo Olympics were invited to compete in the Thayer Tutt Trophy.

== Medalists ==
Gold	Silver	Bronze
Soviet Union Zinetula Bilyaletdinov; Nikolai Drozdetski; Viacheslav Fetisov; Aleksandr Gerasimov; Alexei Kasatonov; Andrei Khomutov; Vladimir Kovin; Aleksandr Kozhevnikov; Vladimir Krutov; Igor Larionov; Sergei Makarov; Vladimir Myshkin; Vasili Pervukhin; Sergei Shepelev; Alexander Skvortsov; Sergei Starikov; Igor Stelnov; Vladislav Tretiak; Viktor Tyumenev; Mikhail Vasiliev	Czechoslovakia Milan Chalupa; Jaroslav Benák; Vladimír Caldr; František Černík; Miloslav Hořava; Jiří Hrdina; Arnold Kadlec; Jaroslav Korbela; Jiří Králík; Vladimír Kýhos; Jiří Lála; Igor Liba; Vincent Lukáč; Dušan Pašek; Pavel Richter; Dárius Rusnák; Vladimír Růžička; Jaromír Šindel; Radoslav Svoboda; Eduard Uvíra	Sweden Thomas Åhlén; Per-Eric Eklund; Thom Eklund; Bo Ericsson; Håkan Eriksson; Peter Gradin; Mats Hessel; Michael Hjälm; Göran Lindblom; Tommy Mörth; Håkan Nordin; Rolf Riddervall; Jens Öhling; Thomas Rundqvist; Tomas Sandström; Håkan Södergren; Mats Thelin; Michael Thelvén; Mats Waltin; Göte Wälitalo

- Gold – "Team members USSR". International Olympic Committee.
- Silver – "Team members CZECHOSLOVAKIA". International Olympic Committee.
- Bronze – "Team members SWEDEN". International Olympic Committee.

== Qualification ==
The final standings of the 1983 championships were used to establish qualification. All pool 'A' teams were included; however, the German Democratic Republic declined to send a team. The host Yugoslavians as well as the top pool 'B' teams were added. A play-off between the fourth placed pool 'B' team and the pool 'C' champion was used to determine the final place at the Olympics.

9 April 1983	Norway	4–4	Netherlands	West Germany

10 April 1983	Norway	10–2	Netherlands	West Germany

The Norwegian team proceeded to compete at the Olympics.

== First round ==
=== Group A ===
Team	Pld	W	L	D	GF	GA	GD	Pts
Soviet Union	5	5	0	0	42	5	+37	10
Sweden	5	3	1	1	34	15	+19	7
West Germany	5	3	1	1	27	17	+10	7
Poland	5	1	4	0	16	37	−21	2
Italy	5	1	4	0	15	31	−16	2
Yugoslavia (H)	5	1	4	0	8	37	−29	2

Source: HockeyCanada.ca
(H) Hosts

7 February 1984	Sweden	11–3 (2–1, 3–2, 6–0)	Italy

7 February 1984	Soviet Union	12–1 (3–1, 4–0, 5–0)	Poland

7 February 1984	West Germany	8–1 (1–1, 4–0, 3–0)	Yugoslavia

9 February 1984	Soviet Union	5–1 (4–0, 1–1, 0–0)	Italy

9 February 1984	Poland	5–8 (2–2, 1–3, 2–3)	West Germany

9 February 1984	Yugoslavia	0–11 (0–4, 0–1, 0–6)	Sweden

11 February 1984	Yugoslavia	1–9 (0–4, 1–1, 0–4)	Soviet Union

11 February 1984	Italy	6–1 (0–1, 4–0, 2–0)	Poland

11 February 1984	West Germany	1–1 (1–0, 0–0, 0–1)	Sweden

13 February 1984	West Germany	1–6 (1–4, 0–2, 0–0)	Soviet Union

13 February 1984	Sweden	10–1 (2–1, 7–0, 1–0)	Poland

13 February 1984	Yugoslavia	5–1 (0–0, 2–1, 3–0)	Italy

15 February 1984	Soviet Union	10–1 (5–0, 4–0, 1–1)	Sweden

15 February 1984	Yugoslavia	1–8 (1–2, 0–3, 0–3)	Poland

15 February 1984	West Germany	9–4 (1–0, 5–1, 3–3)	Italy

=== Group B ===
Team	Pld	W	L	D	GF	GA	GD	Pts
Czechoslovakia	5	5	0	0	38	7	+31	10
Canada	5	4	1	0	24	10	+14	8
Finland	5	2	2	1	27	19	+8	5
United States	5	1	2	2	16	17	−1	4
Austria	5	1	4	0	13	37	−24	2
Norway	5	0	4	1	15	43	−28	1

Source: HockeyCanada.ca

7 February 1984	United States	2–4 (1–2, 1–1, 0–1)	Canada

7 February 1984	Austria	3–4 (0–1, 1–2, 2–1)	Finland

7 February 1984	Czechoslovakia	10–4 (2–0, 5–2, 3–2)	Norway

9 February 1984	Canada	8–1 (2–0, 4–0, 2–1)	Austria

9 February 1984	Czechoslovakia	4–1 (2–1, 1–0, 1–0)	United States

9 February 1984	Finland	16–2 (5–0, 6–1, 5–1)	Norway

11 February 1984	Austria	0–13 (0–0, 0–6, 0–7)	Czechoslovakia

11 February 1984	Norway	3–3 (1–2, 1–0, 1–1)	United States

11 February 1984	Canada	4–2 (1–0, 0–2, 3–0)	Finland

13 February 1984	Canada	8–1 (2–0, 3–0, 3–1)	Norway

13 February 1984	Finland	2–7 (1–4, 1–1, 0–2)	Czechoslovakia

13 February 1984	United States	7–3 (2–1, 0–1, 5–1)	Austria

15 February 1984	Czechoslovakia	4–0 (1–0, 1–0, 2–0)	Canada

15 February 1984	Finland	3–3 (1–0, 1–2, 1–1)	United States

15 February 1984	Norway	5–6 (1–4, 3–2, 1–0)	Austria

== Final round ==
The top two teams from each group play the top two teams from the other group once. Head to head results from the preliminary round (Soviet Union defeated Sweden 10–1, Czechoslovakia defeated Canada 4–0) were carried over.

Team	Pld	W	L	D	GF	GA	GD	Pts
Soviet Union	3	3	0	0	16	1	+15	6
Czechoslovakia	3	2	1	0	6	2	+4	4
Sweden	3	1	2	0	3	12	−9	2
Canada	3	0	3	0	0	10	−10	0

Source: HockeyCanada.ca

17 February 1984	Soviet Union	4–0 (0–0, 2–0, 2–0)	Canada

17 February 1984	Czechoslovakia	2–0 (0–0, 0–0, 2–0)	Sweden

19 February 1984	Sweden	2–0 (0–0, 1–0, 1–0)	Canada

19 February 1984	Soviet Union	2–0 (1–0, 1–0, 0–0)	Czechoslovakia

== Classification round ==
Those countries that finished 3rd and 4th in their groups then played a further game to define their classification.

=== 5th place game ===
17 February 1984	West Germany	7–4 (1–2, 1–2, 5–0)	Finland

=== 7th place game ===
17 February 1984	United States	7–4 (2–2, 4–2, 1–0)	Poland

== Statistics ==
=== Average age ===
Team Italy was the oldest team in the tournament, averaging 27 years and 8 months. Team Canada was the youngest team in the tournament, averaging 21 years and 6 months. Gold medalists Team USSR averaged 26 years and 1 months. Tournament average was 24 years and 9 months.

=== Leading scorers ===
Rk	Player	GP	G	A	Pts
1	(Germany) Erich Kühnhackl	6	8	6	14
2	(Sweden) Peter Gradin	7	9	4	13
3	(Soviet Union) Nikolai Drozdetsky	7	10	2	12
4	(Soviet Union) Viacheslav Fetisov	7	3	8	11
5	(Finland) Petri Skriko	6	6	4	10
6	(Finland) Raimo Summanen	6	4	6	10
7	(Czechoslovakia) Dárius Rusnák	7	4	6	10
7	(Czechoslovakia) Vladimír Růžička	7	4	6	10
7	(Czechoslovakia) Jiří Hrdina	7	4	6	10
10	(Czechoslovakia) Vincent Lukáč	7	4	5	9

== Final ranking ==
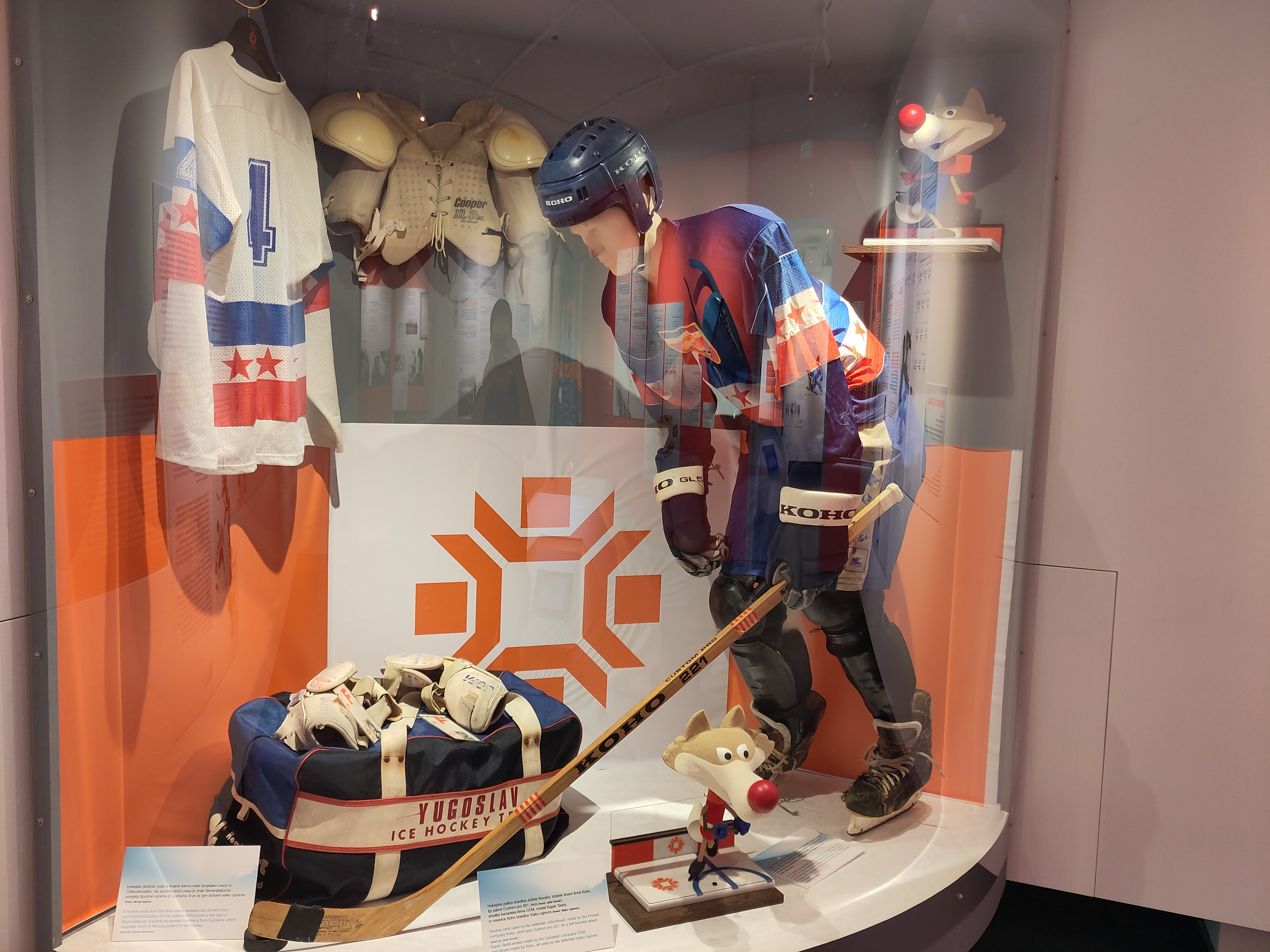
Ice hockey equipment of the Yugoslavian team at the 1984 Olympics

1. Soviet Union
2. Czechoslovakia
3. Sweden
4. Canada
5. West Germany
6. Finland
7. United States
8. Poland
9. Italy
10. Austria
11. Yugoslavia
12. Norway
