= Alexander Gerasimov (ice hockey) =

Soviet ice hockey player (1959–2020)

- Born: 19 March 1959 Penza, Soviet Union
- Died: 21 May 2020 (aged 61)
- Height: 6 ft 0 in (183 cm)
- Played for: Dizel Penza; CSKA Moscow
- National team: Soviet Union
- Playing career: 1975–1988
Medal record
Men's ice hockey
Olympic Games
Gold medal – first place	1984 Sarajevo	Ice hockey

Aleksandr Gerasimov (19 March 1959 – 21 May 2020) was a Soviet ice hockey player. He won a gold medal at the 1984 Winter Olympics.

== Career statistics ==
=== Regular season and playoffs ===
			Regular season
Season	Team	League	GP	G	A	Pts	PIM
1975–76	Dizel Penza	USSR II	9	0	2	2	4
1976–77	Dizel Penza	USSR II	33	5	3	8	28
1977–78	Dizel Penza	USSR II	45	18	13	31	30
1978–79	Dizel Penza	USSR II	52	22	23	45	38
1979–80	Dizel Penza	USSR II	60	30	10	40	68
1980–81	CSKA Moscow	USSR	30	3	1	4	2
1981–82	CSKA Moscow	USSR	45	11	6	17	14
1982–83	CSKA Moscow	USSR	32	19	10	29	14
1983–84	CSKA Moscow	USSR	30	10	12	22	13
1984–85	CSKA Moscow	USSR	27	9	4	13	10
1985–86	CSKA Moscow	USSR	31	12	8	20	10
1986–87	CSKA Moscow	USSR	26	7	8	15	16
1987–88	CSKA Moscow	USSR	11	1	5	6	0
USSR II totals			199	75	51	126	168
USSR totals			232	72	54	126	79

=== International ===
Year	Team	Event	GP	G	A	Pts	PIM
1977	Soviet Union	EJC	6	5	4	9	12
1978	Soviet Union	WJC	7	2	6	8	2
1979	Soviet Union	WJC	6	2	6	8	24
1984	Soviet Union	OG	7	2	3	5	6

== Death ==
Gerasimov died on 21 May 2020.
