= Hans Magnusson =

Swedish speed skater

Personal information
- Nationality: Swedish
- Born: 5 July 1960 (age 64); Svenstavik, Sweden

Sport
- Sport: Speed skating

Hans Magnusson (born 5 July 1960) is a Swedish speed skater. He competed at the 1984 Winter Olympics and the 1988 Winter Olympics.
