= Nils Stefansson =

Swedish bobsledder

Personal information
- Nationality: Swedish
- Born: 16 March 1957 (age 68); Sundsvall, Sweden

Sport
- Sport: Bobsleigh

Nils Axel Stefansson (born 16 March 1957) is a Swedish bobsledder. He competed in the two-man and the four-man events at the 1984 Winter Olympics.

Stefansson represented Djurgårdens IF.
