= Göte Wälitalo =

Swedish ice hockey player

- Born: July 18, 1956 (age 70) Kiruna, Sweden
- Height: 6 ft 0 in (183 cm)
- Weight: 176 lb (80 kg; 12 st 8 lb)
- Position: Goaltender
- Caught: Left
- Played for: IF Björklöven
- National team: Sweden
- Playing career: 1973–1988

Göte Wälitalo
Medal record

Representing Sweden

Men's Ice Hockey
Bronze medal – third place	1984 Sarajevo	Team

Göte Emil Wälitalo (born July 18, 1956) is a Swedish former professional ice hockey goaltender.

Wälitalo began his career with his hometown team Kiruna AIF before joining IF Björklöven in 1980. He would spend the next eight season with Björklöven before retiring in 1988. He later head coach of Team Kiruna, IF Björklöven's J20 team and Tegs SK. He also became an assistant coach of Sweden's under-18 team as well as a goaltending coach for Björklöven and Vännäs HC.

Walitalo also played for the Swedish national team and won a bronze medal at the 1984 Winter Olympics.
