= Sven Fahlén =

Swedish biathlete (born 1959)

Personal information
- Nationality: Swedish
- Born: 6 October 1959 (age 65); Östersund, Sweden

Sport
- Sport: Biathlon

Sven Fahlén (born 6 October 1959) is a Swedish biathlete. He competed at the 1980 Winter Olympics and the 1984 Winter Olympics.
