= Rolf Ridderwall =

Swedish ice hockey player

- Born: 20 November 1958 (age 67) Stockholm, Sweden
- Height: 5 ft 11 in (180 cm)
- Weight: 172 lb (78 kg; 12 st 4 lb)
- Position: Goaltender
- Caught: Left
- Played for: Djurgårdens IF (Elitserien)
- National team: Sweden
- NHL draft: Undrafted
- Playing career: 1981–1994

Olympic medal record

Men's Ice hockey
Bronze medal – third place	1984 Sarajevo	Team competition

Rolf Lennart "Riddarn" ("the Knight") Ridderwall (born 20 November 1958) is a retired Swedish ice hockey goaltender. He played for Djurgårdens IF in the Swedish Elite League almost his entire career. Ridderwall won the Golden Puck as the top player in Sweden for the 1989–90 season.

== Family ==
His son, Stefan Ridderwall, is also a hockey goaltender, and his nephew, Calle Ridderwall, is currently playing professional ice hockey in Germany with the Düsseldorfer EG of the Deutsche Eishockey Liga.

Preceded by Kent Nilsson	Golden Puck; 1990	Succeeded by Thomas Rundqvist
