= 1977–78 Elitserien season =

- League: Elitserien
- Sport: Ice hockey
- Duration: 6 October 1977 – 15 March 1978

Regular season
- League champion: Brynäs IF

Playoffs
- Finals champions: Skellefteå AIK
- Runners-up: AIK

SHL seasons
- 1976–77 1978–79

The 1977–78 Elitserien season was the third season of the Elitserien, the top level of ice hockey in Sweden. 10 teams participated in the league, and Skellefteå AIK won the championship.

== Standings ==
Teams 1-4 qualify for 1978 Swedish Championship Playoffs
Team 9 plays qualifier to retain spot in Elitserien.
Team 10 is relegated to Division 1 for 1978–79 season.

	Club	GP	W	T	L	GF	GA	Pts
1.	Brynäs IF	36	24	3	9	168	126	51
2.	Skellefteå AIK	36	21	5	10	186	139	47
3.	AIK	36	20	5	11	160	116	45
4.	MoDo AIK	36	21	3	12	151	112	45
5.	Färjestads BK	36	21	2	13	173	146	44
6.	Västra Frölunda IF	36	17	9	10	158	122	43
7	Leksands IF	36	14	6	16	154	153	34
8.	Djurgårdens IF	36	9	7	20	138	139	25
9.	Timrå IK	36	5	4	27	102	180	14
10.	Södertälje SK	36	4	4	28	83	190	12

== Playoffs ==
Semifinal
1	Brynäs IF	1
3	AIK	2
2	Skellefteå AIK	2
4	MoDo AIK	0

Final
3	AIK	1
2	Skellefteå AIK	2
