= 1979–80 Elitserien season =

- League: Elitserien
- Sport: Ice hockey
- Duration: 27 September 1979 – 20 March 1980

Regular season
- League champion: Leksands IF

Playoffs
- Finals champions: Brynäs IF
- Runners-up: Västra Frölunda IF

SHL seasons
- ← 1978–79 1980–81 →

The 1979–80 Elitserien season was the fifth season of the Elitserien, the top level of ice hockey in Sweden. 10 teams participated in the league, and Brynas IF won the championship.

== Standings ==
	Club	GP	W	T	L	GF	GA	Pts
1.	Leksands IF	36	18	7	11	156	124	43
2.	IF Björklöven	36	17	8	11	156	145	42
3.	Västra Frölunda IF	36	19	3	14	153	137	41
4.	Brynäs IF	36	17	5	14	130	120	39
5.	AIK	36	16	6	14	137	127	38
6.	Djurgårdens IF	36	16	6	14	145	152	38
7	Färjestads BK	36	14	8	14	142	145	36
8.	MoDo AIK	36	15	5	16	154	139	35
9.	Skellefteå AIK	36	12	4	20	141	168	28
10.	HV 71 Jönköping	36	8	4	24	113	170	20

== Playoffs ==
Semifinal
1	Leksands IF	0
4	Brynäs IF	2
2	IF Björklöven	1
3	Västra Frölunda IF	2

Final
4	Brynäs IF	3
3	Västra Frölunda IF	2
