= 1978–79 Elitserien season =

- League: Elitserien
- Sport: Ice hockey
- Duration: 5 October 1978 – 8 March 1979

Regular season
- League champion: Modo AIK

Playoffs
- Finals champions: Modo AIK
- Runners-up: Djurgårdens IF

SHL seasons
- 1977–78 1979–80

The 1978–79 Elitserien season was the fourth season of the Elitserien, the top level of ice hockey in Sweden. 10 teams have participated in this league, and MoDo AIK won the championship.

== Standings ==
	Club	GP	W	T	L	GF	GA	Pts
1.	MoDo AIK	36	24	5	7	169	101	53
2.	Färjestads BK	36	19	6	11	153	122	44
3.	Djurgårdens IF	36	20	2	14	178	140	42
4.	Leksands IF	36	19	4	13	150	131	42
5.	Västra Frölunda IF	36	18	4	14	157	129	40
6.	Skellefteå AIK	36	16	3	17	129	142	35
7	Brynäs IF	36	15	5	16	133	148	35
8.	AIK	36	13	7	16	133	137	33
9.	IF Björklöven	36	8	7	21	111	157	23
10.	Örebro IK	36	3	7	26	95	201	13

== Playoffs ==
Semifinal
1	MoDo AIK	2
4	Leksands IF	1
2	Färjestad BK	1
3	Djurgårdens IF	2

Final
1	MoDO AIK	2
3	Djurgårdens IF	1
