= 1982–83 Elitserien season =

- League: Elitserien
- Sport: Ice hockey
- Duration: 26 September 1982 – 3 March 1983

Regular season
- League champion: Färjestads BK

Playoffs
- Finals champions: Djurgårdens IF
- Runners-up: Färjestads BK

SHL seasons
- ← 1981–82 1983–84 →

The 1982–83 Elitserien season was the eighth season of the Elitserien, the top level of ice hockey in Sweden. 10 teams participated in the league, and Djurgårdens IF won the championship.

== Standings ==
	Club	GP	W	T	L	GF	GA	Pts
1.	Färjestads BK	36	22	6	8	184	123	50
2.	Djurgårdens IF	36	21	7	8	169	120	49
3.	AIK	36	20	7	9	151	107	47
4.	IF Björklöven	36	19	5	12	146	119	43
5.	Leksands IF	36	17	5	14	157	149	39
6.	Brynäs IF	36	12	8	16	143	160	32
7	Västra Frölunda IF	36	12	6	18	135	160	30
8.	Skellefteå AIK	36	10	7	19	119	149	27
9.	MoDo AIK	36	9	6	21	128	194	24
10.	Hammarby IF	36	7	5	24	126	177	19

== Playoffs ==
Semifinals
1	Färjestads BK	2
3	AIK	1
2	Djurgårdens IF	2
4	IF Björklöven	1

Final
1	Färjestads BK	2
2	Djurgårdens IF	3
