= 1983–84 Elitserien season =

- League: Elitserien
- Sport: Ice hockey
- Duration: 22 September 1983 – 11 March 1984

Regular season
- League champion: AIK

Playoffs
- Finals champions: AIK
- Runners-up: Djurgårdens IF

SHL seasons
- ← 1982–83 1984–85 →

The 1983–84 Elitserien season was the ninth season of the Elitserien, the top level of ice hockey in Sweden. 10 teams participated in the league, and AIK won the championship.

== Standings ==
	Club	GP	W	T	L	GF	GA	Pts
1.	AIK	36	19	6	11	141	114	44
2.	Djurgårdens IF	36	18	5	13	144	123	41
3.	IF Björklöven	36	15	10	11	140	121	40
4.	Södertälje SK	36	17	6	13	157	154	40
5.	Färjestads BK	36	16	6	14	130	134	38
6.	Skellefteå AIK	36	15	5	16	132	122	35
7	Leksands IF	36	14	7	15	147	140	35
8.	Brynäs IF	36	12	8	16	140	140	32
9.	MoDo AIK	36	12	7	17	131	148	31
10.	Västra Frölunda IF	36	8	8	20	129	195	24

== Playoffs ==
Semifinals
1	AIK	2
4	Södertälje SK	1
2	Djurgårdens IF	2
3	IF Björklöven	1

Final
1	AIK	3
2	Djurgårdens IF	0
