= Lars-Gunnar Pettersson =

Swedish professional ice hockey forward (born 1960)

- Born: 8 April 1960 (age 66) Luleå, Sweden
- Height: 6 ft 0 in (183 cm)
- Weight: 185 lb (84 kg; 13 st 3 lb)
- Position: Right wing
- Shot: Left
- Played for: SEL; Björklöven; Luleå HF
- National team: Sweden
- NHL draft: 174th overall, 1980; Edmonton Oilers
- Playing career: 1980–1994

Lars-Gunnar Pettersson (born 8 April 1960) is a retired Swedish professional ice hockey forward who spent all of his professional career in the Elitserien. He was drafted 174th overall into the National Hockey League by the Edmonton Oilers in the 1980 NHL entry draft. He has represented Sweden 5 times internationally, winning 1 gold, 1 silver and 2 bronze.

After the 1993–1994 season, he retired from ice hockey.

== Career statistics ==
=== Regular season and playoffs ===
			Regular season					Playoffs
Season	Team	League	GP	G	A	Pts	PIM	GP	G	A	Pts	PIM
1976–77	IFK Luleå	SWE II	9	3	1	4	—	—	—	—	—	—
1977–78	GroKo Hockey	SWE II	27	23	9	32	14	—	—	—	—	—
1978–79	GroKo Hockey	SWE II	24	22	10	32	12	—	—	—	—	—
1979–80	Luleå HF	SWE II	26	35	10	45	8	—	—	—	—	—
1980–81	IF Björklöven	SEL	33	7	10	17	12	—	—	—	—	—
1981–82	IF Björklöven	SEL	17	6	4	10	8	2	0	0	0	2
1982–83	IF Björklöven	SEL	36	20	12	32	10	1	0	1	1	0
1983–84	IF Björklöven	SEL	34	15	17	32	16	3	0	1	1	0
1984–85	IF Björklöven	SEL	35	24	11	35	21	3	4	1	5	0
1985–86	IF Björklöven	SEL	29	20	12	32	14	—	—	—	—	—
1986–87	IF Björklöven	SEL	36	28	13	41	16	6	3	3	6	4
1987–88	Luleå HF	SEL	40	11	16	27	18	—	—	—	—	—
1988–89	Luleå HF	SEL	40	29	24	53	14	3	1	1	2	0
1989–90	Luleå HF	SEL	40	24	18	42	12	5	1	0	1	2
1990–91	Luleå HF	SEL	40	30	16	46	6	5	2	1	3	0
1991–92	Luleå HF	SEL	40	24	17	41	24	2	0	0	0	2
1992–93	Luleå HF	SEL	39	19	6	25	6	11	2	2	4	2
1993–94	Luleå HF	SEL	36	14	6	20	30	—	—	—	—	—
SWE II totals			86	83	30	113	34	—	—	—	—	—
SEL totals			495	271	182	453	207	41	13	10	23	12

=== International ===
Lars-Gunnar Pettersson
Medal record

Men's ice hockey

Representing Sweden

Olympic Games
Bronze medal – third place	1988 Calgary	

World Championships
Silver medal – second place	1986 Soviet Union	
Gold medal – first place	1987 Vienna	

World Junior Championships
Bronze medal – third place	1980 Helsinki	

Year	Team	Event	GP	G	A	Pts	PIM
1978	Sweden	EJC	5	2	2	4	0
1980	Sweden	WJC	5	4	1	5	0
1985	Sweden	WC	10	3	2	5	16
1986	Sweden	WC	9	4	3	7	6
1987	Sweden	CC	5	2	0	2	0
1987	Sweden	WC	7	2	2	4	2
1988	Sweden	OG	8	3	4	7	2
Junior totals			10	6	3	9	0
Senior totals			39	14	11	25	26
