= Lars Karlsson (ice hockey) =

Swedish ice hockey player

Personal information
- Born: Lars Olof Karlsson; June 28, 1960 (age 66)

Sport
- Position: Defence
Medal record
Representing Sweden
Men's Ice Hockey
Bronze medal – third place	1988 Calgary	Team

Lars Olof Karlsson (born June 28, 1960) is a Swedish ice hockey defenceman who played for the Swedish national team. He won a bronze medal at the 1988 Winter Olympics. He played for IF Björklöven and for Leksands IF.

== Career statistics ==
=== Regular season and playoffs ===
			Regular season					Playoffs
Season	Team	League	GP	G	A	Pts	PIM	GP	G	A	Pts	PIM
1976–77	Kiruna AIF	SWE II	7	1	1	2	0	—	—	—	—	—
1977–78	Kiruna AIF	SWE II	24	3	5	8	16	—	—	—	—	—
1978–79	Kiruna AIF	SWE II	21	6	8	14	16	—	—	—	—	—
1979–80	Leksands IF	SEL	36	2	3	5	32	2	0	0	0	4
1980–81	Leksands IF	SEL	30	3	7	10	26	—	—	—	—	—
1981–82	Leksands IF	SEL	36	6	11	17	24	—	—	—	—	—
1982–83	Leksands IF	SEL	36	5	10	15	28	—	—	—	—	—
1983–84	Leksands IF	SEL	30	2	7	9	18	—	—	—	—	—
1984–85	IF Björklöven	SEL	34	8	9	17	14	3	0	0	0	0
1985–86	IF Björklöven	SEL	32	7	13	20	10	—	—	—	—	—
1986–87	IF Björklöven	SEL	35	10	23	33	21	6	1	3	4	2
1987–88	IF Björklöven	SEL	37	3	13	16	18	8	2	5	7	6
1988–89	IF Björklöven	SEL	4	0	2	2	2	—	—	—	—	—
1988–89	IF Björklöven	Allsv	14	2	6	8	6	6	3	4	7	2
1989–90	IF Björklöven	SWE II	34	11	23	34	20	—	—	—	—	—
1990–91	IF Björklöven	SWE II	33	13	16	29	49	2	0	0	0	2
1991–92	IF Björklöven	SWE II	35	12	30	42	24	—	—	—	—	—
1992–93	IF Björklöven	SWE II	35	10	24	34	26	9	2	5	7	2
1993–94	Lycksele SK	SWE III	8	3	10	13	10	—	—	—	—	—
SWE II totals			189	56	107	163	151	11	2	5	7	4
SEL totals			310	46	98	144	193	19	3	8	11	12

=== International ===
Year	Team	Event	GP	G	A	Pts	PIM
1978	Sweden	EJC	5	1	3	4	2
1979	Sweden	WJC	6	0	1	1	2
1980	Sweden	WJC	5	0	0	0	4
1987	Sweden	WC	8	2	1	3	10
1987	Sweden	CC	4	1	1	2	0
1988	Sweden	OG	7	1	3	4	4
Junior totals			16	1	4	5	8
Senior totals			19	4	5	9	14
