= Mikael Andersson (ice hockey, born 1959) =

Swedish ice hockey player (born 1959)

- Born: 6 July 1959 (age 67) Kiruna, Sweden
- Height: 6 ft 2 in (188 cm)
- Weight: 194 lb (88 kg; 13 st 12 lb)
- Position: Winger
- Shot: Left
- Played for: MoDo Hockey; IF Björklöven; Västra Frölunda
- National team: Sweden
- Playing career: 1979–1994

Mikael Bo Andersson (born 6 July 1959) is a Swedish retired ice hockey player. He is currently the sports manager and head coach of IF Björklöven in HockeyAllsvenskan.

== Career statistics ==
=== Regular season and playoffs ===
			Regular season					Playoffs
Season	Team	League	GP	G	A	Pts	PIM	GP	G	A	Pts	PIM
1976–77	Kiruna AIF	SWE II	19	11	3	14	—	—	—	—	—	—
1977–78	Kiruna AIF	SWE II	19	10	5	15	10	—	—	—	—	—
1978–79	Kiruna AIF	SWE II	23	28	20	48	18	—	—	—	—	—
1979–80	Modo AIK	SEL	36	8	13	21	23	—	—	—	—	—
1980–81	Modo AIK	SEL	36	14	14	28	28	—	—	—	—	—
1981–82	Modo AIK	SEL	36	11	9	20	20	2	0	0	0	2
1982–83	Modo AIK	SEL	36	18	22	40	12	—	—	—	—	—
1983–84	IF Björklöven	SEL	36	11	15	26	30	3	0	1	1	0
1984–85	IF Björklöven	SEL	35	15	20	35	26	3	1	3	4	2
1985–86	IF Björklöven	SEL	35	7	22	29	24	—	—	—	—	—
1986–87	IF Björklöven	SEL	36	14	22	36	30	6	3	3	6	0
1987–88	IF Björklöven	SEL	40	22	26	48	20	8	1	6	7	8
1988–89	Västra Frölunda HC	SWE II	36	15	29	44	14	11	12	5	17	12
1989–90	Västra Frölunda HC	SEL	40	11	16	27	32	—	—	—	—	—
1990–91	Västra Frölunda HC	SEL	22	2	9	11	28	—	—	—	—	—
1990–91	Västra Frölunda HC	Allsv	18	3	14	17	6	9	3	5	8	6
1991–92	Västra Frölunda HC	SEL	35	2	21	23	48	3	0	2	2	6
1992–93	IF Björklöven	SWE II	36	16	45	61	40	9	3	5	8	10
1993–94	IF Björklöven	SEL	22	2	12	14	20	—	—	—	—	—
1993–94	IF Björklöven	Allsv	18	2	10	12	4	2	0	1	1	0
SWE II totals			133	80	102	182	82	20	15	10	25	22
SEL totals			445	137	221	358	341	25	5	15	20	18

=== International ===
Year	Team	Event	GP	G	A	Pts	PIM
1977	Sweden	EJC	4	—	—	—	—
1978	Sweden	WJC	7	0	1	1	0
1979	Sweden	WJC	6	1	1	2	2
1987	Sweden	WC	10	4	2	6	8
1987	Sweden	CC	5	1	5	6	0
1988	Sweden	OG	8	3	3	6	4
Senior totals			23	8	10	18	12

Preceded by Janne Karlsson	Frölunda HC captains 1990–1992	Succeeded by Terho Koskela
