= Anders Eldebrink =

Swedish ice hockey player

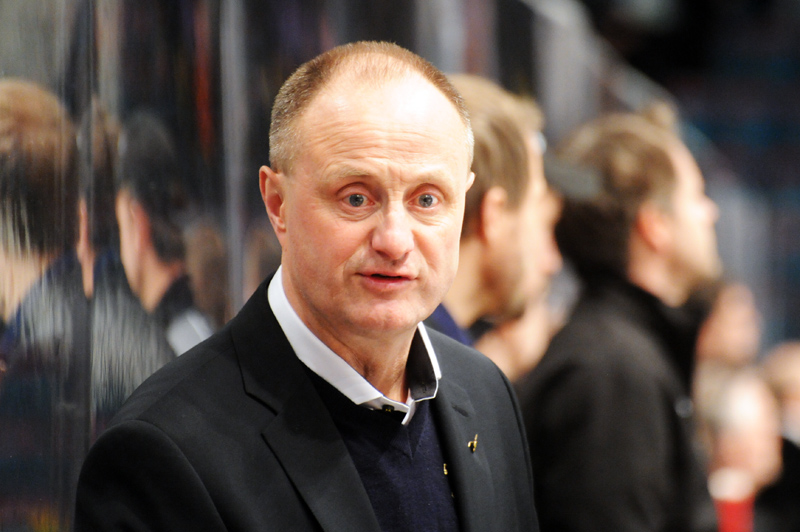
- Anders Eldebrink coaching AIK in January 2013
- Born: 11 December 1960 (age 65) Kalix, Sweden
- Height: 5 ft 11 in (180 cm)
- Weight: 190 lb (86 kg; 13 st 8 lb)
- Position: Defence
- Shot: Right
- Played for: Södertälje SK; Vancouver Canucks; Quebec Nordiques; EHC Kloten
- National team: Sweden
- NHL draft: Undrafted
- Playing career: 1976–1998

Medal record

Representing Sweden

Men's ice hockey

World Championships
| Gold medal – first place | 1987 Austria | |
| Silver medal – second place | 1981 Sweden | |
| Silver medal – second place | 1986 Soviet Union | |
| Silver medal – second place | 1990 Switzerland | |

Olympic Games
| Bronze medal – third place | 1988 Calgary | |

Anders Karl Daniel Eldebrink (born 11 December 1960) is a Swedish former ice hockey defenceman who played in the SEL in the 1970s and 1980s. He also played 165 games for the Swedish national team.

== Playing career ==
Eldebrink began his career at age 16 in 1976 in the Swedish Elite League. Playing for Södertälje SK, he was named Player of the Year in 1985 and MVP in 1988 and 1989. They won the league championship in 1985. Later he played in Switzerland for EHC Kloten, winning the league championship in 1993, 1994, and 1995. He also played two NHL seasons with the Vancouver Canucks and Quebec Nordiques.

Internationally, he was on the 1984 and 1987 Swedish Canada Cup teams, which made the final in 1984; the IIHF World Championships gold medal team in 1987; and the Olympic Bronze medal team in 1988. He was named to the World Championship all-star team in 1989.

On 14 April 2014 it was announced that he had been appointed to the Swedish Hockey Hall of Fame.

== Coaching career ==
After his playing career, Eldebrink became Sports Manager of the Södertälje SK team in 1998.

When Vladimir Yurzinov was released as the coach of EHC Kloten in October 2004, Anders Eldebrink became the new coach for the Flyers. His assistant coach is his former teammate Felix Hollenstein.

During the 2012–13 Elitserien season, Eldebrink replaced Per-Erik Johnsson as head coach of AIK IF.

== Personal ==
He is the younger brother of the former athlete Kenth Eldebrink and cousin of former ice hockey defenceman Robert Nordmark.

== Career statistics ==
=== Regular season and playoffs ===
| | | | Regular season | | | | | Playoffs |
| Season | Team | League | GP | G | A | Pts | PIM | GP | G | A | Pts | PIM |
|---|---|---|---|---|---|---|---|---|---|---|---|---|
| 1976–77 | Södertälje SK | SEL | 2 | 0 | 0 | 0 | 2 | — | — | — | — | — |
| 1977–78 | Södertälje SK | SEL | 27 | 4 | 2 | 6 | 14 | — | — | — | — | — |
| 1978–79 | Södertälje SK | SWE II | 36 | 8 | 10 | 18 | 40 | 9 | 3 | 5 | 8 | 8 |
| 1979–80 | Södertälje SK | SWE II | 35 | 15 | 11 | 26 | 16 | — | — | — | — | — |
| 1980–81 | Södertälje SK | SEL | 36 | 5 | 18 | 23 | 37 | — | — | — | — | — |
| 1981–82 | Vancouver Canucks | NHL | 38 | 1 | 8 | 9 | 21 | 13 | 0 | 0 | 0 | 10 |
| 1982–83 | Vancouver Canucks | NHL | 5 | 1 | 1 | 2 | 0 | — | — | — | — | — |
| 1982–83 | Fredericton Express | AHL | 47 | 7 | 26 | 33 | 14 | 12 | 2 | 11 | 13 | 0 |
| 1982–83 | Quebec Nordiques | NHL | 12 | 1 | 2 | 3 | 8 | 1 | 0 | 0 | 0 | 0 |
| 1983–84 | Södertälje SK | SEL | 36 | 10 | 17 | 27 | 40 | 3 | 3 | 0 | 3 | 2 |
| 1984–85 | Södertälje SK | SEL | 34 | 10 | 12 | 22 | 20 | 8 | 2 | 6 | 8 | 14 |
| 1985–86 | Södertälje SK | SEL | 34 | 13 | 16 | 29 | 30 | 7 | 4 | 2 | 6 | 8 |
| 1986–87 | Södertälje SK | SEL | 31 | 11 | 15 | 26 | 40 | — | — | — | — | — |
| 1987–88 | Södertälje SK | SEL | 40 | 12 | 18 | 30 | 54 | 2 | 0 | 0 | 0 | 0 |
| 1988–89 | Södertälje SK | SEL | 38 | 13 | 22 | 35 | 42 | 5 | 5 | 3 | 8 | 10 |
| 1989–90 | Södertälje SK | SEL | 39 | 10 | 20 | 30 | 32 | 2 | 0 | 1 | 1 | 8 |
| 1990–91 | EHC Kloten | NDA | 34 | 15 | 23 | 38 | — | 10 | 1 | 6 | 7 | — |
| 1991–92 | EHC Kloten | NDA | 38 | 16 | 17 | 33 | 22 | — | — | — | — | — |
| 1992–93 | EHC Kloten | NDA | 36 | 14 | 26 | 40 | 65 | 11 | 3 | 8 | 11 | 2 |
| 1993–94 | EHC Kloten | NDA | 36 | 14 | 29 | 43 | 18 | 12 | 4 | 8 | 12 | 14 |
| 1994–95 | EHC Kloten | NDA | 25 | 8 | 16 | 24 | 16 | 12 | 1 | 10 | 11 | 10 |
| 1995–96 | Södertälje SK | SWE II | 32 | 9 | 11 | 20 | 28 | 4 | 2 | 3 | 5 | 4 |
| 1996–97 | EHC Kloten | NDA | 39 | 10 | 13 | 23 | 22 | — | — | — | — | — |
| 1997–98 | Södertälje SK | SEL | 42 | 8 | 11 | 19 | 28 | — | — | — | — | — |
| SEL totals | | | 359 | 96 | 151 | 247 | 339 | 27 | 14 | 12 | 26 | 42 |
| NHL totals | | | 55 | 3 | 11 | 14 | 29 | 14 | 0 | 0 | 0 | 10 |
| NDA totals | | | 208 | 77 | 124 | 201 | 143 | 45 | 9 | 32 | 41 | 26 |

=== International ===
| Year | Team | Event | GP | G | A | Pts | PIM |
|---|---|---|---|---|---|---|---|
| 1981 | Sweden | WC | 8 | 0 | 0 | 0 | 2 |
| 1984 | Sweden | CC | 8 | 0 | 4 | 4 | 6 |
| 1985 | Sweden | WC | 8 | 2 | 1 | 3 | 18 |
| 1986 | Sweden | WC | 7 | 1 | 0 | 1 | 6 |
| 1987 | Sweden | WC | 10 | 3 | 2 | 5 | 4 |
| 1987 | Sweden | CC | 6 | 1 | 2 | 3 | 4 |
| 1988 | Sweden | OLY | 8 | 4 | 6 | 10 | 4 |
| 1989 | Sweden | WC | 9 | 5 | 3 | 8 | 2 |
| 1990 | Sweden | WC | 10 | 2 | 5 | 7 | 10 |
| Senior totals | | | 74 | 18 | 23 | 41 | 56 |

| Preceded by Per-Erik Eklund | Guldpucken; 1985 | Succeeded by Tommy Samuelsson |
