= Tommy Samuelsson =

Swedish ice hockey player and coach

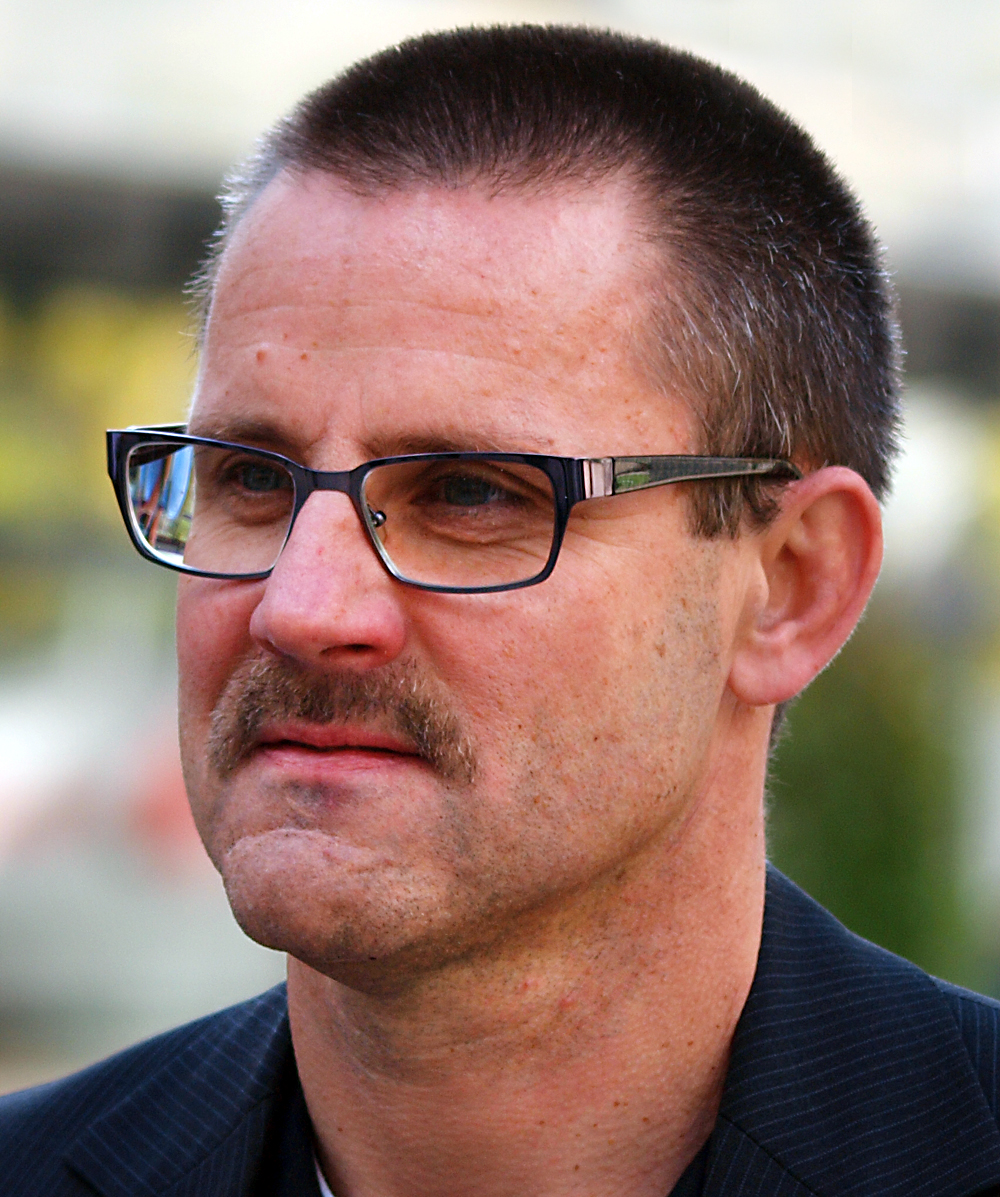
- Tommy Samuelsson in September 2010
- Born: 12 January 1960 (age 66) Degerfors, Sweden
- Height: 5 ft 10 in (178 cm)
- Weight: 165 lb (75 kg; 11 st 11 lb)
- Position: Defence
- Shot: Left
- Played for: Färjestad BK; Wiener EV
- National team: Sweden
- Playing career: 1976–1998

Tommy Alf Samuelsson (born 12 January 1960) is a Swedish ice hockey coach and a retired professional ice hockey player. He is currently the head coach of Timrå IK of the Swedish Hockey League.

== Playing career ==
Samuelson spent the majority of his playing days at Färjestad BK. He won three Swedish championships (1981, 1986, 1988) with the club and received Elitserien MVP honors in 1986. At the end of his career, he spent two years with Wiener EV of Austria and a single season with SC Luzern of Switzerland. Representing the Swedish national team, he won two bronze medals at the 1980 and 1988 Winter Olympics as well as three silver medals at World Championships (1981, 1986, 1990). Samuelsson retired in 1998.

== Coaching career ==
From 1999 to 2004, Samuelsson served as assistant coach of Färjestad BK in Sweden's top-tier Elitserien, winning gold in 2002, before accepting the head coaching job at Austrian first-division side HC Innsbruck for the 2004-05 campaign. In the following season, he guided Skellefteå AIK to promotion from Sweden's second-tier Allsvenskan to the top-flight Swedish Hockey League (SHL).

Prior to the 2005-06 season, he returned to Färjestad, again taking on the role as assistant coach. Samuelsson took over the head coaching job in November 2007 after the sacking of Roger Melin. From 2008 to 2010, Samuelsson worked as joint-coach alongside Per-Erik Johnsson, leading the club to the Swedish national championship in 2009, while receiving SHL Coach of the Year honors. After serving as lone head coach in 2010-11, he left Färjestad for Austria, being appointed as head coach of the Vienna Capitals in March 2011. Under his guidance, the Capitals reached the EBEL finals in 2013. Samuelsson left Vienna at the end of the 2013-14 season to return to Färjestad BK. He served a two-year stint as head coach and parted company with the club in March 2016.

On 5 July 2016, Samuelsson was named head coach of ERC Ingolstadt of the German top-flight Deutsche Eishockey Liga (DEL). He was sacked in November 2017 after his team had suffered defeat in seven straight games.

== Career statistics ==
=== Regular season and playoffs ===
			Regular season					Playoffs
Season	Team	League	GP	G	A	Pts	PIM	GP	G	A	Pts	PIM
1975–76	Mariestad BoIS	SWE III	21	3	3	6	—	—	—	—	—	—
1976–77	Färjestad BK	SEL	1	0	0	0	0	—	—	—	—	—
1977–78	Färjestad BK	SEL	3	0	0	0	0	—	—	—	—	—
1978–79	Färjestad BK	SEL	34	3	2	5	16	3	0	0	0	0
1979–80	Färjestad BK	SEL	36	3	6	9	20	—	—	—	—	—
1980–81	Färjestad BK	SEL	36	2	8	10	16	7	1	0	1	6
1981–82	Färjestad BK	SEL	36	6	8	14	28	2	0	1	1	0
1982–83	Färjestad BK	SEL	36	6	17	23	22	8	3	5	8	6
1983–84	Färjestad BK	SEL	28	7	15	22	26	—	—	—	—	—
1984–85	Färjestad BK	SEL	36	0	9	9	26	3	0	1	1	2
1985–86	Färjestad BK	SEL	36	9	17	26	24	8	0	8	8	4
1986–87	Färjestad BK	SEL	36	7	15	22	16	7	1	4	5	0
1987–88	Färjestad BK	SEL	31	4	11	15	32	—	—	—	—	—
1988–89	Färjestad BK	SEL	36	6	19	25	18	2	0	1	1	2
1989–90	Färjestad BK	SEL	36	7	17	24	20	10	2	4	6	2
1990–91	Färjestad BK	SEL	39	4	11	15	44	8	1	3	4	2
1991–92	Färjestad BK	SEL	38	6	27	33	30	6	0	1	1	6
1992–93	Färjestad BK	SEL	39	7	9	16	28	3	0	2	2	6
1993–94	Färjestad BK	SEL	22	1	4	5	4	—	—	—	—	—
1993–94	Färjestad BK	Allsv	18	4	5	9	6	3	0	1	1	0
1994–95	Färjestad BK	SEL	38	2	8	10	20	4	0	0	0	2
1995–96	Wiener EV	AUT	33	4	26	30	14	—	—	—	—	—
1996–97	SC Luzern	SUI II	36	3	9	12	26	—	—	—	—	—
1997–98	Wiener EV	AUT	30	4	7	11	8	—	—	—	—	—
SEL totals			597	80	203	283	390	71	8	30	38	38

=== International ===
Year	Team	Event	GP	G	A	Pts	PIM
1977	Sweden	EJC	5	0	—	—	—
1978	Sweden	WJC	7	0	2	2	0
1979	Sweden	WJC	6	0	1	1	2
1980	Sweden	OG	7	0	2	2	2
1980	Sweden	WJC	5	1	1	2	6
1981	Sweden	WC	7	0	0	0	4
1982	Sweden	WC	10	0	1	1	2
1983	Sweden	WC	10	0	0	0	0
1986	Sweden	WC	10	1	1	2	8
1987	Sweden	CC	3	0	1	1	4
1988	Sweden	OG	8	0	2	2	2
1989	Sweden	WC	9	0	2	2	2
1990	Sweden	WC	7	0	0	0	4
Senior totals			71	1	9	10	28

Preceded by Anders Eldebrink	Guldpucken; 1986	Succeeded by Håkan Södergren
