= Anders Carlsson (ice hockey) =

Swedish ice hockey player (born 1960)

- Born: 25 November 1960 (age 65) Gävle, Sweden
- Height: 5 ft 11 in (180 cm)
- Weight: 185 lb (84 kg; 13 st 3 lb)
- Position: Centre
- Shot: Left
- Played for: SEL; Brynäs IF; Södertälje SK; VIK Västerås HK; Leksands IF; NHL; New Jersey Devils
- National team: Sweden
- Playing career: 1979–2001

Medal record

Representing Sweden

Men's ice hockey

World Championships
Gold medal – first place	1987 Austria	
Gold medal – first place	1991 Finland	
Silver medal – second place	1986 Soviet Union	
Silver medal – second place	1990 Switzerland	
Silver medal – second place	1997 Finland	

Anders "Masken" Carlsson (born 25 November 1960 in Gävle, Sweden) is a Swedish retired ice hockey center who played parts of three seasons with the New Jersey Devils in the National Hockey League and many seasons in the Elitserien for Brynäs IF, Södertälje SK, VIK Västerås HK and Leksands IF. In addition to playing in the 1987 Canada Cup, he represented Sweden six times at the World Championships, winning gold medals in 1987 and 1991, and silver medals in 1986, 1990 and 1997. He is currently an amateur scout for the Colorado Avalanche He is currently General Manager of SHL-team Rögle BK. He has a dog named Beatrice Carlsson Syrén.

== Career statistics ==
=== Regular season and playoffs ===
			Regular season					Playoffs
Season	Team	League	GP	G	A	Pts	PIM	GP	G	A	Pts	PIM
1978–79	Brynäs IF Gävle	SEL	1	0	0	0	2	—	—	—	—	—
1979–80	Brynäs IF Gävle	SEL	17	0	1	1	6	1	0	0	0	0
1980–81	Brynäs IF Gävle	SEL	36	8	8	16	36	—	—	—	—	—
1981–82	Brynäs IF Gävle	SEL	35	5	5	10	22	—	—	—	—	—
1982–83	Brynäs IF Gävle	SEL	35	18	13	31	26	—	—	—	—	—
1983–84	Brynäs IF Gävle	SEL	35	8	26	34	34	—	—	—	—	—
1984–85	Södertälje SK	SEL	36	20	14	34	18	8	0	3	3	18
1985–86	Södertälje SK	SEL	36	12	26	38	20	7	2	4	6	0
1986–87	New Jersey Devils	NHL	48	2	18	20	14	—	—	—	—	—
1986–87	Maine Mariners	AHL	6	0	6	6	2	—	—	—	—	—
1987–88	New Jersey Devils	NHL	9	1	0	1	0	3	1	0	1	2
1987–88	Utica Devils	AHL	33	12	22	34	16	—	—	—	—	—
1988–89	New Jersey Devils	NHL	47	4	8	12	20	—	—	—	—	—
1988–89	Utica Devils	AHL	7	2	4	6	4	—	—	—	—	—
1989–90	Brynäs IF Gävle	SEL	40	12	31	43	29	2	0	2	2	0
1990–91	Brynäs IF Gävle	SEL	34	11	24	35	22	2	1	1	2	2
1991–92	Team Boro HC	Swe-2	29	33	23	56	32	9	3	3	6	4
1992–93	Brynäs IF Gävle	SEL	40	13	18	31	28	10	3	2	5	6
1993–94	Brynäs IF Gävle	SEL	36	6	11	17	47	7	2	2	4	4
1994–95	Västerås HK	SEL	39	16	22	38	40	4	1	3	4	4
1995–96	Leksands IF	SEL	36	8	18	26	26	5	2	1	3	4
1996–97	Leksands IF	SEL	50	12	27	39	52	9	1	8	9	12
1997–98	Leksands IF	SEL	41	11	20	31	28	2	0	0	0	0
1998–99	Leksands IF	SEL	48	23	34	57	38	4	1	1	2	2
1999–2000	Leksands IF	SEL	48	11	30	41	34	—	—	—	—	—
2000–01	Leksands IF	SEL	10	1	2	3	4	—	—	—	—	—
NHL totals			104	7	26	33	34	3	1	0	1	2
SEL totals			653	195	330	525	512	61	13	27	40	52

=== International ===
Year	Team	Event	GP	G	A	Pts	PIM
1986	Sweden	WC	10	6	6	12	12
1987	Sweden	WC	10	4	3	7	6
1987	Sweden	CC	6	1	0	1	0
1989	Sweden	WC	10	2	3	5	8
1990	Sweden	WC	8	1	0	1	2
1991	Sweden	WC	6	1	1	2	6
1997	Sweden	WC	11	1	1	2	6
Senior totals			61	16	14	30	40
