= Magnus Roupé =

Swedish ice hockey player

- Born: March 23, 1963 (age 63) Stockholm, Sweden
- Height: 6 ft 1 in (185 cm)
- Weight: 190 lb (86 kg; 13 st 8 lb)
- Position: Left wing
- Shot: Left
- Played for: Färjestad BK; Philadelphia Flyers
- National team: Sweden
- NHL draft: 182nd overall, 1982; Philadelphia Flyers
- Playing career: 1981–2002

Karl Gunnar Magnus Roupé (born March 23, 1963) is a Swedish former professional ice hockey player. He spent most of his playing career in Sweden, but spent parts of two National Hockey League (NHL) seasons with the Philadelphia Flyers.

== Career statistics ==
=== Regular season and playoffs ===
			Regular season					Playoffs
Season	Team	League	GP	G	A	Pts	PIM	GP	G	A	Pts	PIM
1981–82	Färjestad BK	SHL	24	5	3	8	8	2	0	0	0	0
1982–83	Färjestad BK	SHL	29	7	4	11	16	6	1	1	2	8
1983–84	Färjestad BK	SHL	36	2	3	5	38	—	—	—	—	—
1984–85	Färjestad BK	SHL	31	9	6	15	16	3	1	0	1	0
1985–86	Färjestad BK	SHL	35	11	10	21	38	8	3	2	5	18
1986–87	Färjestad BK	SHL	31	11	6	17	64	7	1	2	3	10
1987–88	Philadelphia Flyers	NHL	33	2	4	6	32	—	—	—	—	—
1987–88	Hershey Bears	AHL	23	6	16	22	10	11	3	4	7	31
1988–89	Hershey Bears	AHL	12	2	6	8	17	—	—	—	—	—
1988–89	Philadelphia Flyers	NHL	7	1	1	2	10	—	—	—	—	—
1988–89	Färjestad BK	SHL	18	9	4	13	58	2	0	1	1	6
1989–90	Färjestad BK	SHL	39	19	17	36	66	9	1	2	3	14
1990–91	Färjestad BK	SHL	39	9	10	19	54	8	2	5	7	12
1991–92	Färjestad BK	SHL	39	3	9	12	22	6	0	0	0	4
1992–93	Arvika HC	SWE-1	31	23	18	41	30	—	—	—	—	—
1993–94	Arvika HC	SWE-1	32	22	19	41	72	—	—	—	—	—
1994–95	Grums IK	SWE-1	32	13	22	35	75	—	—	—	—	—
1995–96	Grums IK	SWE-1	32	18	29	47	36	5	6	4	10	4
1996–97	Grums IK	SWE-1	31	17	25	42	63	2	0	1	1	2
1997–98	Eisbären Berlin	DEL	34	3	4	7	22	6	0	0	0	0
1998–99	Grums IK	SWE-1	27	9	13	22	82	—	—	—	—	—
2000–01	Grums IK	SWE-1	—	—	—	—	—	2	1	1	2	0
2001–02	Ekshärads HC	SWE-2	2	0	1	1	—	—	—	—	—	—
NHL totals			40	3	5	8	42	—	—	—	—	—

=== International ===
Year	Team	Event	GP	G	A	Pts	PIM
1981	Sweden	EJC	5	2	2	4	6
1982	Sweden	WJC	7	7	3	10	4
1983	Sweden	WJC	7	1	2	3	12
1987	Sweden	CC	5	1	1	2	4
1990	Sweden	WC	10	0	3	3	8
Junior totals			19	10	7	17	22
Senior totals			15	1	4	5	12
