= Peter Andersson (ice hockey, born 1962) =

Swedish ice hockey player (born 1962)

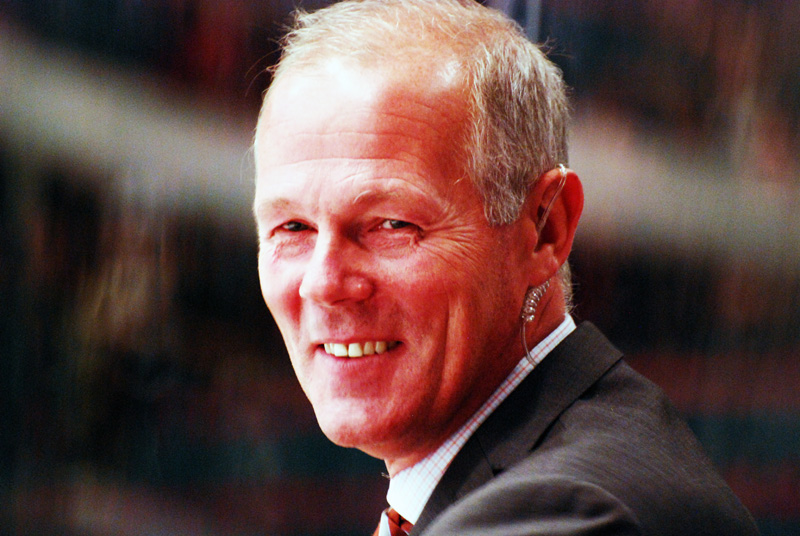
- Born: 2 March 1962 (age 64) Stockholm, Sweden
- Height: 6 ft 2 in (188 cm)
- Weight: 200 lb (91 kg; 14 st 4 lb)
- Position: Defence
- Shot: Right
- Played for: IF Björklöven; Washington Capitals; Quebec Nordiques; EV Zug; EHC Kloten
- National team: Sweden
- NHL draft: 173rd overall, 1980; Washington Capitals
- Playing career: 1978–1995
Medal record
Olympic Games
Bronze medal – third place	1988 Calgary	Team

Peter Nils Andersson (born 2 March 1962) is a Swedish retired ice hockey player who played briefly in the National Hockey League. Selected in the 1980 NHL entry draft by the Washington Capitals, Andersson also played for the Quebec Nordiques.

== Career statistics ==
=== Regular season and playoffs ===
			Regular season					Playoffs
Season	Team	League	GP	G	A	Pts	PIM	GP	G	A	Pts	PIM
1978–79	Timrå IK	SWE II	4	0	3	3	0	—	—	—	—	—
1979–80	Timrå IK	SWE II	22	6	4	10	6	—	—	—	—	—
1980–81	IF Björklöven	SEL	31	1	2	3	16	—	—	—	—	—
1981–82	IF Björklöven	SEL	33	7	7	14	36	—	—	—	—	—
1982–83	IF Björklöven	SEL	36	8	16	24	30	3	0	0	0	0
1983–84	Washington Capitals	NHL	42	3	7	10	20	3	0	1	1	2
1984–85	Washington Capitals	NHL	57	0	10	10	21	2	0	0	0	0
1984–85	Binghamton Rangers	AHL	13	2	3	5	6	—	—	—	—	—
1985–86	Washington Capitals	NHL	61	6	16	22	36	—	—	—	—	—
1985–86	Quebec Nordiques	NHL	12	1	8	9	4	2	0	1	1	0
1986–87	IF Björklöven	SEL	38	6	10	16	30	6	2	1	3	4
1987–88	IF Björklöven	SEL	40	6	12	18	40	8	1	5	6	2
1988–89	IF Björklöven	SEL	22	2	9	11	10	—	—	—	—	—
1988–89	IF Björklöven	Allsv	16	0	12	12	16	7	4	3	7	7
1989–90	EV Zug	NDA	26	5	6	11	6	—	—	—	—	—
1989–90	EHC Kloten	NDA	8	3	3	6	2	5	1	2	3	4
1990–91	IF Björklöven	SWE II	36	11	18	29	18	—	—	—	—	—
1991–92	IF Björklöven	SWE II	35	9	20	29	30	—	—	—	—	—
1992–93	IF Björklöven	SWE II	35	10	23	33	32	9	1	1	2	12
1993–94	IF Björklöven	SEL	22	1	5	6	14	—	—	—	—	—
1993–94	IF Björklöven	Allsv	16	0	4	4	18	2	0	0	0	0
1994–95	IF Björklöven	SWE II	28	6	7	13	20	4	1	3	4	0
SWE II totals			160	42	75	117	106	13	2	4	6	12
SEL totals			220	31	61	92	176	17	3	6	9	6
NHL totals			172	10	41	51	81	7	0	2	2	2

=== International ===
Year	Team	Event	GP	G	A	Pts	PIM
1980	Sweden	EJC	5	1	1	2	4
1981	Sweden	WJC	5	1	1	2	2
1982	Sweden	WJC	7	3	6	9	12
1982	Sweden	WC	10	2	1	3	2
1983	Sweden	WC	10	1	1	2	8
1984	Sweden	CC	8	1	1	2	4
1987	Sweden	WC	10	0	5	5	8
1987	Sweden	CC	5	1	1	2	2
1988	Sweden	OG	8	2	2	4	4
1989	Sweden	WC	8	0	1	1	4
1990	Sweden	WC	10	0	2	2	6
1991	Sweden	WC	10	1	0	1	4
1991	Sweden	CC	6	0	0	0	2
1992	Sweden	OG	8	1	2	3	4
Junior totals			17	5	8	13	18
Senior totals			93	9	16	25	48
