= 1987 Canada Cup =

1987 edition of the Canada Cup

Coupe Canada de 1987 (French)

Tournament details
- Host countries: Canada; United States
- Venues: 7 (in 7 host cities)
- Dates: August 28 – September 15, 1987
- Teams: 6

Final positions
- Champions: Canada (3rd title)

Tournament statistics
- Games played: 20
- Goals scored: 139 (6.95 per game)
- Scoring leader: (Canada) Wayne Gretzky (21 pts)

Awards
- MVP: (Canada) Wayne Gretzky

The 1987 Labatt Canada Cup was a professional international ice hockey tournament held from August 28 to September 15, 1987. The finals took place in Montreal on September 11 and Hamilton, on September 13 and September 15, and were won by Team Canada.

The final best-of-three series of this tournament between Canada and the Soviet Union is considered by many to be the best exhibition of hockey in history. The United States and Soviet Union teams complained about the neutrality of the officiating in the tournament. Soviet coach Viktor Tikhonov said he felt the main reason his team lost the final match was because of "bias and errors in refereeing."

The tournament was the only time that arguably two of the most dominant NHL players of all time, Wayne Gretzky and Mario Lemieux, played on the same forward unit, combining with each other on 29% of Team Canada's goals. The winning Canadian team had 12 future Hockey Hall of Fame members on the roster.

== Rosters ==
=== Canada ===
Forwards and defence: Dale Hawerchuk, Mark Messier, Mike Gartner, Glenn Anderson, Kevin Dineen, Michel Goulet, Brent Sutter, Rick Tocchet, Brian Propp, Doug Gilmour, Claude Lemieux, Mario Lemieux, Wayne Gretzky, Doug Crossman, Craig Hartsburg, Normand Rochefort, James Patrick, Raymond Bourque, Larry Murphy, Paul Coffey
Goaltenders: Ron Hextall, Kelly Hrudey, Grant Fuhr
Coaches: Mike Keenan, John Muckler, Jean Perron, Tom Watt

=== Czechoslovakia ===
Forwards and defence: Petr Rosol, Igor Liba, Ján Jaško, Jiří Kučera, Jiří Doležal, Vladimír Růžička, Ladislav Lubina, David Volek, Petr Vlk, Dušan Pašek, Jiří Šejba, Jiří Hrdina, Rostislav Vlach, Miloslav Hořava, Drahomír Kadlec, Luděk Čajka, Bedřich Ščerban, Jaroslav Benák, Antonín Stavjaňa, Mojmír Božík
Goaltenders: Petr Bříza, Dominik Hašek, Jaromír Šindel
Coaches: Ján Starší, František Pospíšil

=== Finland ===
Forwards and defence: Timo Blomqvist, Jari Grönstrand, Matti Hagman, Raimo Helminen, Iiro Järvi, Timo Jutila, Jari Kurri, Markku Kyllonen, Mikko Mäkelä, Jouko Narvanmaa, Teppo Numminen, Janne Ojanen, Reijo Ruotsalainen, Christian Ruuttu, Jukka Seppo, Ville Siren, Petri Skriko, Raimo Summanen, Esa Tikkanen, Hannu Virta
Goaltenders: Jarmo Myllys, Kari Takko, Jukka Tammi
Coaches: Rauno Korpi, Juhani Tamminen

=== Sweden ===
Forwards and defence: Tommy Albelin, Mikael Andersson, Peter Andersson, Jonas Bergqvist, Anders Carlsson, Thom Eklund, Anders Eldebrink, Peter Eriksson, Bengt-Åke Gustafsson, Tomas Jonsson, Lars Karlsson, Mats Näslund, Kent Nilsson, Lars-Gunnar Pettersson, Magnus Roupé, Thomas Rundqvist, Tommy Samuelsson, Håkan Södergren, Peter Sundström, Michael Thelvén
Goaltenders: Anders Bergman, Åke Lilljebjörn, Peter Lindmark
Coaches: Tommy Sandlin, Curt Lindström, Ingvar Carlsten

=== United States ===
Forwards and defence: Joe Mullen, Curt Fraser, Corey Millen, Aaron Broten, Kelly Miller, Mark Johnson, Bob Brooke, Wayne Presley, Pat LaFontaine, Bobby Carpenter, Ed Olczyk, Joel Otto, Chris Nilan, Dave Ellett, Mike Ramsey, Kevin Hatcher, Rod Langway, Phil Housley, Gary Suter, Chris Chelios
Goaltenders: Tom Barrasso, Bob Mason, John Vanbiesbrouck
Coaches: Bob Johnson, Ted Sator, Doug Woog

=== Soviet Union ===
Forwards and defence: Vyacheslav Fetisov, Alexei Gusarov, Igor Stelnov, Vasily Pervukhin, Alexei Kasatonov, Anatoli Fedotov, Igor Kravchuk, Yuri Khmylev, Vladimir Krutov, Andrei Lomakin, Igor Larionov, Valeri Kamensky, Andrei Khomutov, Sergei Svetlov, Alexander Semak, Sergei Nemchinov, Sergei Makarov, Vyacheslav Bykov, Anatoly Semenov
Goaltenders: Vitali Samoilov, Sergei Mylnikov, Evgeny Belosheikin
Coaches: Viktor Tikhonov, Igor Dmitriev

== Round robin standings ==
Team	Pld	W	D	L	GF	GA	GD	Pts	Qualification
Canada (C)	5	3	2	0	19	13	+6	8	Advanced to semifinals
Soviet Union	5	3	1	1	22	13	+9	7	Advanced to semifinals
Sweden	5	3	0	2	17	14	+3	6	Advanced to semifinals
Czechoslovakia	5	2	1	2	12	15	−3	5	Advanced to semifinals
United States	5	2	0	3	13	14	−1	4	
Finland	5	0	0	5	9	23	−14	0	

Source: https://internationalhockeywiki.com/ihw/index.php/1987_Canada_Cup
(C) Champions

== Game scores ==
=== Round-robin ===
Friday, 28 August 1987; 18:00 MDT	Canada	4–4 ( 2–2, 1–1, 1–1 )	Czechoslovakia	Olympic Saddledome, Calgary; Attendance: 8,458

Grant Fuhr
Goalies
Dominik Hašek

(Gretzky, Propp) Tocchet – 5:57	1–0
	1–1	10:22 – Pašek (Liba, Vlach)
	1–2	12:18 – Hořava (Volek, Doležal)
(Bourque, Messier) Hawerchuk 1 – 17:38	2–2
(Dineen, M.Lemieux) C.Lemieux – 28:33	3–2
	3–3	35:19 – Vlk (Hořava, Kadlec)
(M.Lemieux, Gretzky) Coffey – 42:06	4–3
	4–4	47:00 – Volek (Hrdina, Stavjaňa)

4 min
Penalties
10 min
40
Shots
36

Friday, 28 August 1987; 19:30 EDT	Finland	1–4 ( 0–0, 0–1, 1–3 )	United States	Civic Center Coliseum, Hartford; Attendance: 8,508

Kari Takko
Goalies
John Vanbiesbrouck

	0–1	29:17 – LaFontaine (Broten)
	0–2	44:47 – LaFontaine (Suter, Housley)
	0–3	47:31 – Presley (Suter)
	0–4	57:49 – Mullen 1 (Ramsey)
(Helminen) Jutila – 58:29	1–4

12 min
Penalties
16 min
23
Shots
40

Saturday, 29 August 1987; 12:00 MDT	Sweden	5–3 ( 3–1, 1–2, 1–0 )	Soviet Union	Olympic Saddledome, Calgary; Attendance: 3,055

Peter Lindmark
Goalies
Yevgeni Belosheikin
Referee:
Mike Noeth (USA)

	0–1	2:07 – Kamensky (Bykov, Stelnov)
(Naslund, Thelven) Gustafsson – 5:50	1–1
(Eldebrink, Nilsson) Albelin – 6:38	2–1
(Karlsson, Jonsson) Carlsson – 7:37	3–1
	3–2	31:49 – Krutov – sh
	3–3	35:14 – Khomutov 1
Karlsson – 36:09	4–3
(Nilsson) Sundstrom – 59:29	5–3

6 min
Penalties
6 min
20
Shots
14

Sunday, 30 August 1987; 20:00 EDT	Finland	1–4 ( 0–2, 1–2, 0–0 )	Canada	Copps Coliseum, Hamilton; Attendance: 9,624

Kari Takko
Goalies
Grant Fuhr

	0–1	3:12 – Dale Hawerchuk 2 (Kevin Dineen, Brian Propp)
	0–2	4:50 – Rick Tocchet 2
	0–3	22:49 – Kevin Dineen 1 (Larry Murphy)
(Hannu Virta, Mikko Mäkelä) Christian Ruutu 1 – 27:22	1–3
	1–4	33:15 – Mark Messier 1 (Claude Lemieux, Ray Bourque)

18 min
Penalties
12 min
40
Shots
54

Monday, 31 August 1987; 12:00 CST	Soviet Union	4–0 (2–0, 1–0, 1–0 )	Czechoslovakia	Agridome, Regina; Attendance: 5,477

Sergei Mylnikov	Goalies	Dominik Hašek
(Igor Stelnov, Sergei Makarov) Vladimir Krutov 2 – 15:25 (Igor Kravchuk, Sergei Priakhin) Alex Semak 1 – 18:17 (Igor Kravchuk) Igor Stelnov 1 – 26:27 (Viacheslav Fetisov, Andrei Lomakin) Anatoli Semenov 1 – 46:03 / Goals
19 min	Penalties	24 min
27	Shots	23

Monday, 31 August 1987; 19:30 EDT	United States	5–2 ( 1–0, 3–1, 1–1 )	Sweden	Copps Coliseum, Hamilton; Attendance: 4,474

John Vanbiesbrouck	Goalies	Peter Lindmark
(Joel Otto, Ed Olczyk) Bob Carpenter 1 – 3:38 (Bob Carpenter, Joel Otto) Ed Olczyk 1 – 22:54 (Phil Housley, Curt Fraser) Chris Nilan 1 – 26:15 (Rod Langway) Bob Brooke 1 – 32:51 (Mark Johnson, Neal Broten) Joe Mullen 2 – 42:13 / Goals / 35:55 – Bengt Gustafsson 2 (Mats Näslund, Anders Eldebrink); 47:34 – Mats Näslund 1 (Anders Eldebrink, Kent Nilsson)
10 min	Penalties	6 min
30	Shots	28

Wednesday, 2 September 1987; 12:00 CST	Czechoslovakia	0–4 ( 0–1, 0–1, 0–2 )	Sweden	Agridome, Regina

Dominik Hašek	Goalies	Peter Lindmark
Goals / 14:30 – Jonas Bergqvist 1 (Hakan Sodergren); 33:15 – Anders Eldebrink 1 (Mikael Andersson); 49:04 – Lars Pettersson 1 (Thom Eklund, Michael Thelven); 57:40 – Thom Eklund 1 (Tommy Samuelsson, Mikael Andersson)
14 min	Penalties	18 min
26	Shots	28

Wednesday, 2 September 1987; 12:00 ADT	Soviet Union	7–4 ( 3–3, 3–0, 1–1 )	Finland	Metro Centre, Halifax; Attendance: 3,262

Sergei Mylnikov	Goalies	Kari Takko
(Igor Kravchuk, Andrei Khomutov) Valeri Kamensky 2 – 2:02 (Alex Semenov) Andrei Lomakin 1 – 2:51 (Sergei Bykov, Vladimir Krutov) Sergei Makarov 1 – 5:02 (Vasily Pervukhin, Sergei Svetlov) Andrei Lomakin 2 – 22:03 (Igor Larionov, Igor Stelnov) Sergei Makarov 2 – 23:45 (Yuri Khmylev, Igor Larionov) Sergei Makarov 3 – 39:24 (Igor Kravchuk, Sergei Bykov) Valeri Kamensky 3 – 42:28 / Goals / 3:59 – Teppo Numminen 1 (Jari Kurri, Christian Ruutu) 13:14 – Raimo Summanen 1 (Raimo Helminen); 14:05 – Jukka Seppo 1 (Janne Ojanen, Markku Kyllonen) 55:47 – Mikko Mäkelä 1 (Raimo Helminen, Raimo Summanen)
8 min	Penalties	6 min
37	Shots	22

Wednesday, 2 September 1987; 20:00 EDT	United States	2–3 ( 1–0, 0–2, 1–1 )	Canada	Copps Coliseum, Hamilton; Attendance: 17,026

John Vanbiesbrouck	Goalies	Grant Fuhr	Referee: Karl-Gustav Kaisla (FIN)
Pat Lafontaine 3 – 10:40 (Chris Chelios, Gary Suter) Corey Millen 1 – 56:60 / Goals / 25:57 – Mario Lemieux 1 (Craig Hartsburg); 39:57 – Mario Lemieux 2 – pp (Wayne Gretzky, Mark Messier); 45:59 – Mario Lemieux 3 – pp (Wayne Gretzky, Mark Messier)			Referee: Karl-Gustav Kaisla (FIN)
28 min	Penalties	12 min	Referee: Karl-Gustav Kaisla (FIN)
30	Shots	40	Referee: Karl-Gustav Kaisla (FIN)

Friday, 4 September 1987; 14:00 ADT	Czechoslovakia	5–2 ( 2–0, 2–0, 1–2 )	Finland	Centre 200, Sydney; Attendance: 4,500

Dominik Hašek	Goalies	Kari Takko (40:00); Jarmo Myllys (20:00)
(Igor Liba, Luděk Čajka) Dušan Pašek 2 – 4:55 (Miloslav Hořava, Dušan Pašek) pp – Jiří Šejba 1 – 9:40 (Mojmír Božík, Ladislav Lubina) Jaroslav Benák 1 – 32:22; Vladimír Růžička 1 – 36:57 (Luděk Čajka) Petr Vlk 2 – 47:29 / Goals / 53:54 – Matti Hagman 1 (Markku Kyllonen, Esa Tikkanen); 56:58 – Jari Kurri 1 (Petri Skriko)
10 min	Penalties	8 min
35	Shots	22

Friday, 4 September 1987; 19:30 EDT	Soviet Union	5–1 ( 2–0, 1–1, 2–0 )	United States	Civic Center Coliseum, Hartford; Attendance: 14,838

Sergei Mylnikov	Goalies	Tom Barrasso	Referee: Vladimír Šubrt (TCH)
(Viacheslav Bykov) Valeri Kamensky 4 – 4:30 (Vladimir Krutov, Alexei Kasatonov) Sergei Makarov 4 – pp – 16:16 (Andrei Lomakin) Sergei Svetlov 1 – 38:40 (Sergei Makarov, Alexei Kasatonov) Vladmir Krutov 3 – 54:31 (Sergei Svetlov) Anatoli Semenov 2 – 59:07 / Goals / 30:28 Joe Mullen 3 (Chris Chelios)			Referee: Vladimír Šubrt (TCH)
6 min	Penalties	19 min	Referee: Vladimír Šubrt (TCH)
27	Shots	20	Referee: Vladimír Šubrt (TCH)

Friday, 4 September 1987; 20:00 EDT	Canada	5–3 ( 2–2, 1–0, 2–1 )	Sweden	Forum, Montréal; Attendance: 12,360

Grant Fuhr
Goalies
Peter Lindmark

(Paul Coffey, Ray Bourque) Wayne Gretzky 1 – pp – 1:55	1–0
	1–1	10:01 – Bengt Gustafsson 3 (Magnus Roupe)
	1–2	11:26 Lars Pettersson 2 (Tommy Albelin, Mikael Andersson)
(Paul Coffey, Wayne Gretzky) Mario Lemieux 4 – pp – 17:10	2–2
Mike Gartner 1 – 38:23	3–2
	3–3	42:12 – Mikael Andersson 1 (Thom Eklund)
(Wayne Gretzky) Mario Lemieux 5 – 45:40	4–3
(James Patrick, Wayne Gretzky) Michel Goulet 1 – 51:20	5–3

10 min
Penalties
10 min
23
Shots
22

Sunday, 6 September 1987; 12:00 ADT	Sweden	3–1 ( 1–0, 1–0, 1–1 )	Finland	Centre 200, Sydney; Attendance: 4,500

Peter Lindmark	Goalies	Kari Takko
(Michael Thelven, Mikael Andersson) Tomas Jonsson 1 – pp – 10:38 (Thomas Rundqvist, Kent Nilsson) Tommy Albelin 2 – 38:04; Magnus Roupe 1 – 48:53 / Goals / 50:17 – Christian Ruutu 2
8 min	Penalties	6 min
21	Shots	23

Sunday, 6 September 1987; 16:00 ADT	United States	1–3 ( 0–1, 1–1, 0–1 )	Czechoslovakia	Centre 200, Sydney; Attendance: 4,500

John Vanbiesbrouck	Goalies	Dominik Hašek
Chris Nilan 2 – 22:29 / Goals / 13:38 – Vladimír Růžicka 2 (Petr Rosol) 34:12 – Dušan Pašek 3 – pp (Jaroslav Benák, Mojmír Božík); 56:04 – Jiří Hrdina 1 – sh (Luděk Čajka)
10 min	Penalties	12 min
37	Shots	25

Sunday, 6 September 1987; 20:00 EDT	Canada	3–3 ( 1–0, 1–3, 1–0 )	Soviet Union	Copps Coliseum, Hamilton; Attendance: 17,026

Grant Fuhr	Goalies	Evgeny Belosheikin	Referee: Mike Noeth (USA)
(Mario Lemieux) Glenn Anderson 1 – 5:37 (Mark Messier, Wayne Gretzky) Ray Bourque 1 – pp – 31:16 (Glenn Anderson, Mark Messier) Wayne Gretzky 2 – 57:33 / Goals / 21:32 – Sergei Svetlov 2 (Anatoli Semenov, Andrei Lomakin); 23:27 – Vladimir Krutov 4 (Sergei Makarov, Igor Stelnov); 28:15 – Sergei Svetlov 3 – sh (Viacheslav Fetisov, Anatoli Semenov)			Referee: Mike Noeth (USA)
4 min	Penalties	12 min	Referee: Mike Noeth (USA)
30	Shots	36	Referee: Mike Noeth (USA)

=== Semi-finals ===
8 September 1987; 20:00 EDT	Soviet Union	4–2	Sweden	Copps Coliseum, Hamilton; Attendance: 7,051

Sergei Mylnikov	Goalies	Peter Lindmark
(Alexei Kasatonov, Sergei Makarov) Vladimir Krutov 5 – pp – 1:09 (Vladimir Krutov) Viacheslav Bykov 1 – 27:29 (Viacheslav Fetisov, Sergei Makarov) Igor Larionov 1 – 28:37 (Viacheslav Fetisov, Vladimir Krutov) Sergei Makarov 5 – 47:42 / Goals / 34:39 – Jonas Bergqvist 2 (Hakan Sodergren, Mikael Andersson) 53:47 – pp – Peter Andersson 1 (Mikael Andersson, Thomas Rundqvist)
12 min	Penalties	10 min
24	Shots	26

9 September 1987; 20:00 EDT	Canada	5–3	Czechoslovakia	The Forum, Montreal; Attendance: 10,262

Grant Fuhr	Goalies	Dominik Hašek
(Michel Goulet, Larry Murphy) Dale Hawerchuk 3 – 30:43 (Michel Goulet) Mario Lemieux 6 – 31:25 (Wayne Gretzky, Ray Bourque) Mario Lemieux 7 – 33:08 (Brent Sutter, Wayne Gretzky) Michel Goulet 2 – 48:16 (Brent Sutter, Mario Lemieux) Brian Propp 1 – 57:56 / Goals / 8:06 – Dušan Pašek 4 (Igor Liba, Jiří Šejba); 13:41 – Jaroslav Benák 2 (Igor Liba, Jiří Šejba) 55:26 – David Volek 2 (Jiří Hrdina, Jaroslav Benák)
6 min	Penalties	6 min
37	Shots	24

=== Final (best of three) ===
11 September 1987; 20:00 EDT	Soviet Union	6–5 (OT)	Canada	The Forum, Montreal; Attendance: 14,588

Sergei Mylnikov	Goalies	Grant Fuhr	Referee: (Canada) Don Koharski
(Anatoli Semenov, Viacheslav Fetisov) Alexei Kasatonov 1 – pp – 9:34 (Sergei Makarov, Viacheslav Fetisov) Vladimir Krutov 6 – pp – 13:53 (Vladimir Krutov) Sergei Makarov 6 – sh – 17:44 (Alexei Gusarov, Andrei Khomutov) Valeri Kamensky 5 – 22:10 (Viacheslav Bykov) Andrei Khomutov 2 – 57:33 (Anatoli Semenov, Andrei Lomakin) Alexander Semak 2 – 65:33 / Goals / 1:49 – Mike Gartner 2 (Mario Lemieux, Normand Rochefort) 39:18 – pp – Ray Bourque 2 (Wayne Gretzky, Mario Lemieux); 41:35 – Doug Gilmour 1 (Mike Gartner, Craig Hartsburg); 54:39 – Glenn Anderson 2 (Mark Messier, Larry Murphy); 57:01 – Wayne Gretzky 3 (Ray Bourque)			Referee: (Canada) Don Koharski
16 min	Penalties	12 min	Referee: (Canada) Don Koharski
43	Shots	33	Referee: (Canada) Don Koharski

13 September 1987; 20:00 EDT	Canada	6–5 (2OT)	Soviet Union	Copps Coliseum, Hamilton; Attendance: 17,026

Grant Fuhr	Goalies	Evgeny Belosheikin	Referee: (United States) Paul Stewart
(Dale Hawerchuk, Mark Messier) Normand Rochefort 1 – 0:43 (Wayne Gretzky, Normand Rochefort) Doug Gilmour 2 – 3:48 (Mike Gartner, Wayne Gretzky) Paul Coffey 2 – 12:41 (Wayne Gretzky) Mario Lemieux 8 – 36:32 (Paul Coffey, Wayne Gretzky) Mario Lemieux 9 – pp – 50:14 (Larry Murphy, Wayne Gretzky) Mario Lemieux 10 – 90:07 / Goals / 1:27 – Andrei Khomutov 3 (Viacheslav Bykov) 32:11 – pp – Viacheslav Fetisov 1 (Vladimir Krutov, Alexei Kasatonov); 34:17 – sh – Vladimir Krutov 7 (Sergei Makarov) 44:45 – Viacheslav Bykov 2 (Andrei Khomutov, Valeri Kamensky) 58:56 – Valeri Kamensky 6 (Viacheslav Bykov, Vasily Pervukhin)			Referee: (United States) Paul Stewart
16 min	Penalties	12 min	Referee: (United States) Paul Stewart
43	Shots	33	Referee: (United States) Paul Stewart

15 September 1987; 20:00 EDT	Canada	6–5	Soviet Union	Copps Coliseum, Hamilton; Attendance: 17,026

Grant Fuhr	Goalies	Sergei Mylnikov	Referee: (Canada) Don Koharski
(Larry Murphy, Michel Goulet) Rick Tocchet – pp – 3 – 9:50 (Brent Sutter, Rick Tocchet) Brian Propp 2 – 15:23 (Mario Lemieux, Wayne Gretzky) Larry Murphy – pp – 1 – 29:30 (Doug Crossman, Dale Hawerchuk) Brent Sutter 1 – 31:06 (Brian Propp, Larry Murphy) Dale Hawerchuk 4 – 35:32 (Wayne Gretzky) Mario Lemieux 11 – 58:34 / Goals / 0:26 – Sergei Makarov 7 (Vladimir Krutov); 7:04 – Alexei Gusarov 1; 8:00 – Viacheslav Fetisov 2 (Sergei Makarov) 19:32 – Andrei Khomutov 4 52:21 – Alexander Semak 3 (Andrei Lomakin)			Referee: (Canada) Don Koharski
6 min	Penalties	10 min	Referee: (Canada) Don Koharski
46	Shots	23	Referee: (Canada) Don Koharski

Three closely fought 6–5 games decided the '87 Canada Cup.

In Game 1, Canada erased a 4–1 second period deficit to send the game to overtime, only to lose on Alexander Semak's goal at 5:33 of the extra frame.

In Game 2, which is considered by some to be the greatest hockey game ever played, Canada led 3–1 after one period, but this time it was the Soviets who came from behind to tie it 3–3 in the second. Canada scored twice more, each time Mario Lemieux assisted by Wayne Gretzky, but the Soviets replied each time. The tying goal was an end-to-end rush by Valeri Kamensky with 1:04 remaining in regulation time. After a scoreless period of overtime, which featured tremendous goaltending from Grant Fuhr, Gretzky and Lemieux hooked up for the third time of the evening at 10:07 of the second overtime. It was the fifth assist for Gretzky on the night and completed a hat trick for Lemieux.

The Canadians got off to a slow start in the decisive third game. The Soviets scored three times in the first eight minutes to take a 3–0 lead. Canada's grinders took over after that (particularly Rick Tocchet, Brent Sutter, and Dale Hawerchuk), and pulled Canada into a 5–4 lead after two periods. The Soviets tied it back up in the third and the game looked like it would head to overtime again. But late in the third period, Canada coach Mike Keenan, who had been juggling lines all series, sent the trio of Gretzky, Lemieux and Hawerchuk out to play with a faceoff in Canada's end. After Hawerchuk won the faceoff, Gretzky, Lemieux and Larry Murphy rushed up the ice. Soviet defenseman Igor Stelnov was the only man back and he fell down to block a pass across but Gretzky fed the puck back to Lemieux, who fired a shot over the glove of goaltender Sergei Mylnikov with 1:26 remaining. The Gretzky to Lemieux play is one of the most memorable plays in Canadian sports history.

== Final standings ==
1	Canada
2	Soviet Union
3	Sweden
4	Czechoslovakia
5	United States
6	Finland

== Stat leaders ==
=== Points ===
Rk	Player	GP	G	A	Pts	PIM
1	(Canada) Wayne Gretzky	9	3	**18**	**21**	2
2	(Canada) Mario Lemieux	9	**11**	7	18	8
3	(Soviet Union) Sergei Makarov	9	7	8	15	8
4	(Soviet Union) Vladimir Krutov	9	7	7	14	4
5	(Soviet Union) Vyacheslav Bykov	9	2	7	9	4
6	(Canada) Ray Bourque	9	2	6	8	10
7	(Soviet Union) Valeri Kamensky	9	6	1	7	6
8	(Soviet Union) Andrei Khomutov	9	4	3	7	0
9	(Soviet Union) Viacheslav Fetisov	9	2	5	7	9
10	(Soviet Union) Anatoli Semenov	9	2	5	7	2

=== Goals ===
Rk	Player	GP	G
1	(Canada) Mario Lemieux	9	**11**
2	(Soviet Union) Sergei Makarov	9	7
2	(Soviet Union) Vladimir Krutov	9	7
4	(Soviet Union) Valeri Kamensky	9	6
5	(Czechoslovakia) Dušan Pašek	6	4
6	(Soviet Union) Andrei Khomutov	9	4
7	(Canada) Dale Hawerchuk	9	4
8	(Soviet Union) Sergei Svetlov	6	3
9	(Canada) Rick Tocchet	7	3
10	(Canada) Wayne Gretzky	9	3

=== Assists ===
Rk	Player	GP	A
1	(Canada) Wayne Gretzky	9	**18**
2	(Soviet Union) Sergei Makarov	9	8
3	(Soviet Union) Vladimir Krutov	9	7
3	(Soviet Union) Vyacheslav Bykov	9	7
3	(Canada) Mario Lemieux	9	7
6	(Canada) Larry Murphy	8	6
7	(Canada) Ray Bourque	9	6
7	(Canada) Mark Messier	9	6
9	(Soviet Union) Viacheslav Fetisov	9	5
10	(Soviet Union) Anatoli Semenov	9	5

=== PIM ===
Rk	Player	GP	PIM
1	(United States) Chris Nilan	5	**14**
2	(Czechoslovakia) Drahomír Kadlec	3	12
3	(United States) Wayne Presley	5	12
3	(Finland) Mikko Mäkelä	5	12
5	(Czechoslovakia) Dušan Pašek	6	12

=== Goaltender wins ===
Rk	Player	GP	Min	GA	GAA	W	L	T	SO
1	(Canada) Grant Fuhr	9	**575**	**32**	3.34	**6**	1	**2**	0
2	(Soviet Union) Sergei Mylnikov	6	365	18	2.96	5	1	0	1
3	(Sweden) Peter Lindmark	6	360	18	3.00	3	3	0	1
4	(United States) John Vanbiesbrouck	4	240	9	**2.25**	2	2	0	0
5	(Czechoslovakia) Dominik Hašek	6	360	20	3.33	2	3	1	0

=== Goaltender Save Percentage ===
Rk	Player	GP	Shots	GA	Sv.%
1	(United States) John Vanbiesbrouck	4	116	9	**.922**
2	(Czechoslovakia) Dominik Hašek	6	189	20	.894
3	(Soviet Union) Sergei Mylnikov	6	170	18	.894
4	(Canada) Grant Fuhr	9	298	32	.893
5	(Sweden) Peter Lindmark	6	152	18	.882

- minimum 120 minutes played

=== Goaltender Goals Against Average ===
Rk	Player	GP	Mins	GA	GAA
1	(United States) John Vanbiesbrouck	4	240	9	**2.25**
2	(Soviet Union) Sergei Mylnikov	6	365	18	2.96
3	(Sweden) Peter Lindmark	6	360	18	3.00
4	(Czechoslovakia) Dominik Hašek	6	360	20	3.33
5	(Canada) Grant Fuhr	9	**575**	**32**	3.34

- minimum 120 minutes played

All numbers in bold represent that was tournament best

== Trophies and awards ==
=== Tournament champion ===
- Canada

=== Tournament MVP ===
- Wayne Gretzky, Canada

=== All-star team ===
- Goaltender: Grant Fuhr, Canada
- Defence: Ray Bourque, Canada; Viacheslav Fetisov, Soviet Union
- Forwards: Wayne Gretzky, Canada; Mario Lemieux, Canada; Vladimir Krutov, Soviet Union

== See also ==
- Summit Series
- Canada Cup
- World Cup of Hockey
