= Andrei Lomakin =

- Born: April 3, 1964 Voskresensk, Soviet Union
- Died: December 9, 2006 (aged 42) Detroit, Michigan, U.S.
- Height: 5 ft 9 in (175 cm)
- Weight: 174 lb (79 kg; 12 st 6 lb)
- Position: Left wing
- Shot: Left
- Played for: Khimik Voskresensk; HC Dynamo Moscow; Philadelphia Flyers; Florida Panthers; HC Fribourg-Gottéron; Eisbären Berlin; Frankfurt Lions
- National team: Soviet Union
- NHL draft: 138th overall, 1991; Philadelphia Flyers
- Playing career: 1981–1997

Andrei Vyacheslavovich Lomakin (Russian: Андрей Вячеславович Ломакин, April 3, 1964 – December 9, 2006) was a professional ice hockey player who played parts of four seasons in the NHL with the Philadelphia Flyers and Florida Panthers. He played in the Soviet Union prior to that, earning a gold medal at the 1988 Winter Olympics while a member of the Soviet national team.

== Playing career ==
Born in Voskresensk, he played four seasons with Khimik Voskresensk before moving to HC Dynamo Moscow. Lomakin was drafted in the 7th round, 138th overall by the Philadelphia Flyers in the 1991 NHL entry draft. After ten seasons in Russia, Lomakin made his NHL debut in 1991 at the age of 27. He became the first Russian player to ever play for the Flyers, playing 108 games over two seasons, from 1991–92 to 1992–93, scoring 50 points. He spent two more seasons in the NHL with the Florida Panthers, including a career-high 19 goals and 47 points in their inaugural season of 1993–94. He finished his playing career with the Frankfurt Lions of the DEL in 1996–97 at the age of 33.

== Death ==
Lomakin died on December 9, 2006, after a long battle with cancer.

== Career statistics ==
=== Regular season and playoffs ===
			Regular season					Playoffs
Season	Team	League	GP	G	A	Pts	PIM	GP	G	A	Pts	PIM
1981–82	Khimik Voskresensk	USSR	8	1	1	2	2	—	—	—	—	—
1982–83	Khimik Voskresensk	USSR	56	15	8	23	32	—	—	—	—	—
1983–84	Khimik Voskresensk	USSR	44	10	8	18	26	—	—	—	—	—
1984–85	Khimik Voskresensk	USSR	52	13	10	23	24	—	—	—	—	—
1986–87	Dynamo Moscow	USSR	40	15	14	29	30	—	—	—	—	—
1987–88	Dynamo Moscow	USSR	45	10	15	25	24	—	—	—	—	—
1988–89	Dynamo Moscow	USSR	44	9	16	25	22	—	—	—	—	—
1989–90	Dynamo Moscow	USSR	48	11	15	26	36	—	—	—	—	—
1990–91	Dynamo Moscow	USSR	45	16	17	33	22	—	—	—	—	—
1991–92	Dynamo Moscow	CIS	2	1	3	4	2	—	—	—	—	—
1991–92	Philadelphia Flyers	NHL	57	14	16	30	26	—	—	—	—	—
1992–93	Philadelphia Flyers	NHL	51	8	12	20	34	—	—	—	—	—
1993–94	Florida Panthers	NHL	76	19	28	47	26	—	—	—	—	—
1994–95	Florida Panthers	NHL	31	1	6	7	6	—	—	—	—	—
1995–96	Eisbären Berlin	DEL	26	21	14	35	30	—	—	—	—	—
1995–96	HC Fribourg–Gottéron	NDA	8	3	3	6	10	4	0	5	5	4
1996–97	Eisbären Berlin	DEL	30	7	8	15	10	—	—	—	—	—
1996–97	Frankfurt Lions	DEL	12	3	4	7	10	3	0	0	0	0
USSR/CIS totals			384	101	107	208	220	—	—	—	—	—
NHL totals			215	42	62	104	92	—	—	—	—	—

=== International ===
Olympic medal record

Men's ice hockey
Gold medal – first place	1988 Calgary	Ice hockey

Year	Team	Event	Result	GP	G	A	Pts	PIM
1982	Soviet Union	EJC	3rd place, bronze medalist(s)	5	2	0	2	6
1984	Soviet Union	WJC	1st place, gold medalist(s)	7	5	5	10	2
1987	Soviet Union	CC	2nd place, silver medalist(s)	9	2	4	6	10
1988	Soviet Union	OG	1st place, gold medalist(s)	8	1	3	4	2
1991	Soviet Union	WC	3rd place, bronze medalist(s)	10	3	3	6	4
1991	Soviet Union	CC	5th	5	0	2	2	0
Junior totals				12	7	5	12	8
Senior totals				32	6	12	18	16
