= Sergei Svetlov =

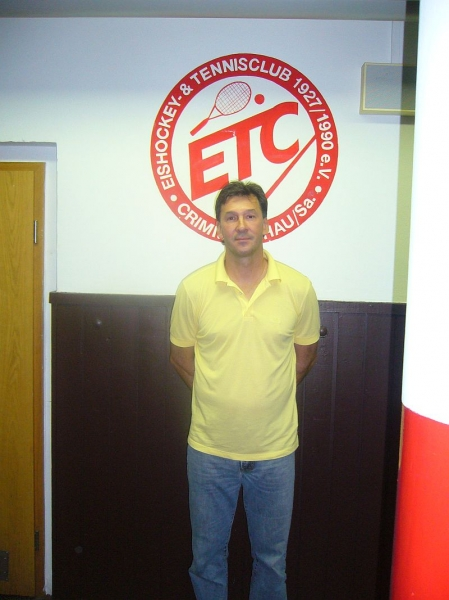
- Sergei Svetlov in 2008
- Born: January 17, 1961 (age 64) Penza, USSR
- Height: 5 ft 11 in (180 cm)
- Weight: 194 lb (88 kg; 13 st 12 lb)
- Position: Right wing
- Shot: Left
- Played for: Dizel Penza; HC Dynamo Moscow; Újpesti Dózsa; EC Ratingen
- National team: Soviet Union
- NHL draft: 180th overall, 1988; New Jersey Devils
- Playing career: 1977–1995

Sergei Aleksandrovich Svetlov (Russian: Сергей Александрович Светлов) born January 17, 1961) is a Russian former professional ice hockey player who played in the Soviet Hockey League. He played for HC Dynamo Moscow, Újpesti Dózsa and EC Ratingen. He was inducted into the Russian and Soviet Hockey Hall of Fame in 1988. From 2012 Head coach of KHL team Atlant (Moscow Region). He also competed in the men's tournament at the 1988 Winter Olympics.

== Career statistics ==
=== Regular season and playoffs ===
			Regular season					Playoffs
Season	Team	League	GP	G	A	Pts	PIM	GP	G	A	Pts	PIM
1977–78	Dizel Penza	USSR II	1	0	0	0	0	—	—	—	—	—
1978–79	Dynamo Moscow	USSR	2	0	0	0	0	—	—	—	—	—
1979–80	Dynamo Moscow	USSR	23	9	5	14	0	—	—	—	—	—
1980–81	Dynamo Moscow	USSR	48	19	15	34	17	—	—	—	—	—
1981–82	Dynamo Moscow	USSR	37	13	13	26	10	—	—	—	—	—
1982–83	Dynamo Moscow	USSR	36	11	11	22	10	—	—	—	—	—
1983–84	Dynamo Moscow	USSR	36	8	9	17	8	—	—	—	—	—
1984–85	Dynamo Moscow	USSR	36	15	11	26	37	—	—	—	—	—
1985–86	Dynamo Moscow	USSR	35	15	20	35	20	—	—	—	—	—
1986–87	Dynamo Moscow	USSR	36	20	19	39	32	—	—	—	—	—
1987–88	Dynamo Moscow	USSR	35	12	18	30	14	—	—	—	—	—
1988–89	Dynamo Moscow	USSR	31	12	10	22	21	—	—	—	—	—
1989–90	Dynamo Moscow	USSR	15	3	4	7	8	—	—	—	—	—
1989–90	Újpesti TE	HUN	—	—	—	—	—	—	—	—	—	—
1990–91	EC Ratingen	DEU II	30	30	31	61	57	—	—	—	—	—
1991–92	EC Ratingen	DEU II	35	41	42	83	31	9	2	3	5	6
1992–93	EC Ratingen	1.GBun	28	12	16	28	21	—	—	—	—	—
1993–94	Herner EV	DEU III	24	34	23	57	6	17	13	14	27	19
1994–95	Herner EV	DEU II	6	2	3	5	0	—	—	—	—	—
USSR totals			372	137	135	272	177	—	—	—	—	—

=== International ===
Year	Team	Event	GP	G	A	Pts	PIM
1980	Soviet Union	WJC	5	3	2	5	0
1981	Soviet Union	WJC	5	3	1	4	2
1984	Soviet Union	CC	6	4	3	7	0
1985	Soviet Union	WC	10	2	4	6	0
1986	Soviet Union	WC	10	3	1	4	4
1987	Soviet Union	WC	10	5	1	6	8
1987	Soviet Union	CC	5	3	2	5	0
1988	Soviet Union	OG	8	2	3	5	4
Junior totals			10	6	3	9	2
Senior totals			49	19	14	33	16
