= Alexander Semak =

- Born: February 11, 1966 (age 60) Ufa, Soviet Union
- Height: 5 ft 10 in (178 cm)
- Weight: 185 lb (84 kg; 13 st 3 lb)
- Position: Center
- Shot: Right
- Played for: New Jersey Devils; New York Islanders; Tampa Bay Lightning; Vancouver Canucks
- NHL draft: 207th overall, 1988; New Jersey Devils
- Playing career: 1982–2005

Medal record

Men's ice hockey

World Championships

Representing Soviet Union
Silver medal – second place	1987 Austria	
Gold medal – first place	1990 Switzerland	
Bronze medal – third place	1991 Finland	

Alexander Vladimirovich Semak (Russian: Александр Владимирович Семак; born February 11, 1966) is a Russian former professional ice hockey centre who played ten seasons in the Soviet League between 1982 and 1992 for Salavat Yulaev Ufa and HC Dynamo Moscow before moving to North America where he played six National Hockey League seasons from 1991–92 until 1996–97. He played for the New Jersey Devils, New York Islanders, Tampa Bay Lightning and Vancouver Canucks.

Semak was drafted 207th overall by the New Jersey Devils in the 1988 NHL entry draft. He played 289 career NHL games, scoring 83 goals and 91 assists for 174 points. His best offensive season was the 1992–93 NHL season when he scored 37 goals and 42 assists for 79 points, all career-highs.

== Career statistics ==
=== Regular season and playoffs ===
			Regular season					Playoffs
Season	Team	League	GP	G	A	Pts	PIM	GP	G	A	Pts	PIM
1982–83	Salavat Yulaev Ufa	USSR	13	2	1	3	4	—	—	—	—	—
1982–83	Avangard Ufa	USSR III	7	9	2	11	4	—	—	—	—	—
1983–84	Salavat Yulaev Ufa	USSR II	41	22	—	—	—	—	—	—	—	—
1984–85	Salavat Yulaev Ufa	USSR II	47	19	17	36	64	—	—	—	—	—
1985–86	Salavat Yulaev Ufa	USSR	22	9	7	16	22	—	—	—	—	—
1986–87	Dynamo Moscow	USSR	40	20	8	28	32	—	—	—	—	—
1987–88	Dynamo Moscow	USSR	47	21	14	35	40	—	—	—	—	—
1988–89	Dynamo Moscow	USSR	44	18	10	28	22	—	—	—	—	—
1989–90	Dynamo Moscow	USSR	43	23	11	34	33	—	—	—	—	—
1990–91	Dynamo Moscow	USSR	46	17	21	38	48	—	—	—	—	—
1991–92	Dynamo Moscow	CIS	26	10	13	23	26	—	—	—	—	—
1991–92	Utica Devils	AHL	7	3	2	5	0	—	—	—	—	—
1991–92	New Jersey Devils	NHL	25	5	6	11	0	1	0	0	0	0
1992–93	New Jersey Devils	NHL	82	37	42	79	70	5	1	1	2	0
1993–94	New Jersey Devils	NHL	54	12	17	29	22	2	0	0	0	0
1994–95	Salavat Yulaev Ufa	IHL	9	9	6	15	4	—	—	—	—	—
1994–95	New Jersey Devils	NHL	19	2	6	8	13	—	—	—	—	—
1994–95	Tampa Bay Lightning	NHL	22	5	5	10	12	—	—	—	—	—
1995–96	New York Islanders	NHL	69	20	14	34	68	—	—	—	—	—
1996–97	Syracuse Crunch	AHL	23	10	14	24	12	—	—	—	—	—
1996–97	Las Vegas Thunder	IHL	13	11	13	24	10	3	0	4	4	4
1996–97	Vancouver Canucks	NHL	18	2	1	3	2	—	—	—	—	—
1997–98	Chicago Wolves	IHL	67	26	35	61	90	22	10	17	27	35
1998–99	Albany River Rats	AHL	70	20	42	62	62	5	0	2	2	4
1999–00	EHC Freiburg	GER-2	51	36	57	93	84	—	—	—	—	—
2000–01	Salavat Yulaev Ufa	RSL	43	17	21	38	148	—	—	—	—	—
2001–02	Salavat Yulaev Ufa	RSL	47	16	21	37	90	—	—	—	—	—
2002–03	Dynamo Moscow	RSL	48	10	13	23	42	5	0	0	0	6
2003–04	Severstal Cherepovets	RSL	27	4	6	10	48	—	—	—	—	—
2003–04	Severstal Cherepovets II	RUS III	1	0	0	0	2	—	—	—	—	—
2004–05	HC MVD Tver	RUS II	25	1	9	10	30	—	—	—	—	—
USSR/CIS totals			281	120	85	205	227	—	—	—	—	—
NHL totals			289	83	91	174	187	8	1	1	2	0
RSL totals			167	48	59	107	338	5	0	0	0	6

=== International ===
Year	Team	Event	GP	G	A	Pts	PIM
1983	Soviet Union	EJC	5	3	3	6	8
1984	Soviet Union	EJC	5	9	8	17	10
1984	Soviet Union	WJC	7	0	4	4	2
1985	Soviet Union	WJC	7	7	4	11	12
1986	Soviet Union	WJC	7	3	6	9	4
1987	Soviet Union	WC	10	1	0	1	4
1987	Soviet Union	CC	7	3	0	3	10
1990	Soviet Union	WC	10	2	2	4	6
1991	Soviet Union	WC	10	5	5	10	8
1991	Soviet Union	CC	5	2	1	3	7
1996	Russia	WCH	1	0	0	0	0
Junior totals			31	22	25	47	36
Senior totals			43	13	8	21	35
