= Sergei Mylnikov =

Soviet-Russian ice hockey player (1958–2017)

- Born: 6 October 1958 Chelyabinsk, Russian SFSR, Soviet Union
- Died: 20 June 2017 (aged 58) Moscow, Russia
- Height: 5 ft 10 in (178 cm)
- Weight: 172 lb (78 kg; 12 st 4 lb)
- Position: Goaltender
- Caught: Left
- Played for: Traktor Chelyabinsk; SKA Leningrad; Quebec Nordiques; Torpedo Yaroslavl; Skedvi/Säter IF
- National team: Soviet Union
- NHL draft: 127th overall, 1989; Quebec Nordiques
- Playing career: 1977–1995
Medal record
Men's ice hockey
Representing the Soviet Union
Olympic Games
| Gold medal – first place | 1988 Calgary | Tournament |
World Championships
| Bronze medal – third place | 1985 Prague | Tournament |
| Gold medal – first place | 1986 Moscow | Tournament |
| Silver medal – second place | 1987 Vienna | Tournament |
| Gold medal – first place | 1989 Sweden | Tournament |
| Gold medal – first place | 1990 Switzerland | Tournament |

Sergei Aleksandrovich Mylnikov (Russian: Сергей Александрович Мыльников; 6 October 1958 – 20 June 2017) was a Soviet and Russian ice hockey goaltender and coach who competed in the Soviet Hockey League, National Hockey League, and the Swedish Division 2 between 1977 and 1995.

He was the first Soviet goaltender to play in the National Hockey League. He mostly played for Traktor Chelyabinsk (1976–80, 1983–89), and also briefly for SKA Leningrad (1980–82), the Quebec Nordiques (1989–90), Torpedo Yaroslavl (1991–93) and Skedvi/Säter IF (1993–95). He was a member of the Soviet national team, winning a gold medal at the 1988 Winter Olympics and at the 1989 and 1990 IIHF World Championships. He was named to the Soviet All-Star team in 1988 and inducted into the Russian and Soviet Hockey Hall of Fame in 1985. Mylnikov helped the Soviet junior team to back-to-back junior world championships in 1977 and 1978. He was also the starting Soviet goaltender at the Canada Cup in 1987.

== Playing career ==
Mylnikov took up hockey at the age of 6, encouraged by his father, and took up the goaltender position because of his relatively small stature. His international debut was delayed by strong competition from multiple gifted Soviet goaltenders, including Vladislav Tretiak and Vladimir Myshkin. Mylnikov finished his career with Säter IF in Sweden in 1995 and remained there as the head coach for two seasons (1995–97). After that, he trained in several Russian clubs from 1997–2012. He also continued playing masters hockey until 2010, when he had major heart surgery. He died in 2017 at the age of 58, and was survived by sons Dmitri and Sergei Jr., a brother, and a nephew – all of whom were ice hockey goaltenders.

== Career statistics ==
=== Regular season and playoffs ===
| | | | Regular season | | | | | | | | | Playoffs |
| Season | Team | League | GP | W | L | T | MIN | GA | SO | GAA | SV% | GP | W | L | MIN | GA | SO | GAA | SV% |
|---|---|---|---|---|---|---|---|---|---|---|---|---|---|---|---|---|---|---|---|
| 1976–77 | Traktor Chelyabinsk | USSR | 2 | — | — | — | 120 | 2 | — | 1.00 | — | — | — | — | — | — | — | — | — |
| 1977–78 | Traktor Chelyabinsk | USSR | 22 | — | — | — | 1320 | 71 | — | 3.22 | — | — | — | — | — | — | — | — | — |
| 1978–79 | Traktor Chelyabinsk | USSR | 32 | — | — | — | 1862 | 90 | — | 2.90 | — | — | — | — | — | — | — | — | — |
| 1979–80 | Traktor Chelyabinsk | USSR | 17 | — | — | — | 1023 | 58 | — | 3.40 | — | — | — | — | — | — | — | — | — |
| 1980–81 | SKA Leningrad | USSR | 40 | — | — | — | 2415 | 157 | — | 3.90 | — | — | — | — | — | — | — | — | — |
| 1981–82 | SKA Leningrad | USSR | 42 | — | — | — | 2310 | 132 | — | 3.42 | — | — | — | — | — | — | — | — | — |
| 1982–83 | Traktor Chelaybinsk | USSR | 37 | — | — | — | 1954 | 124 | — | 3.80 | — | — | — | — | — | — | — | — | — |
| 1983–84 | Traktor Chelaybinsk | USSR | 37 | — | — | — | 2173 | 91 | — | 2.51 | — | — | — | — | — | — | — | — | — |
| 1984–85 | Traktor Chelaybinsk | USSR | 28 | — | — | — | 1360 | 74 | — | 3.26 | — | — | — | — | — | — | — | — | — |
| 1985–86 | Traktor Chelaybinsk | USSR | 37 | — | — | — | 2126 | 96 | — | 2.70 | — | — | — | — | — | — | — | — | — |
| 1986–87 | Traktor Chelaybinsk | USSR | 36 | — | — | — | 2059 | 103 | — | 3.00 | — | — | — | — | — | — | — | — | — |
| 1987–88 | Traktor Chelaybinsk | USSR | 28 | — | — | — | 1559 | 69 | — | 2.65 | — | — | — | — | — | — | — | — | — |
| 1988–89 | Traktor Chelaybinsk | USSR | 33 | — | — | — | 1980 | 85 | — | 2.58 | — | — | — | — | — | — | — | — | — |
| 1989–90 | Quebec Nordiques | NHL | 10 | 1 | 7 | 2 | 568 | 47 | 0 | 4.97 | .857 | — | — | — | — | — | — | — | — |
| 1990–91 | Traktor Chelaybinsk | USSR | 23 | — | — | — | 1360 | 59 | 2 | 2.60 | — | — | — | — | — | — | — | — | — |
| 1991–92 | Torpedo Yaroslavl | USSR | 23 | — | — | — | 1235 | 73 | 0 | 3.55 | — | — | — | — | — | — | — | — | — |
| 1992–93 | Torpedo Yaroslavl | RUS | 23 | — | — | — | — | 55 | — | 2.66 | — | 2 | — | — | — | 4 | 0 | 4.00 | — |
| 1993–94 | Säters IF | SWE-2 | — | — | — | — | — | — | — | — | — | — | — | — | — | — | — | — | — |
| 1994–95 | Säters IF | SWE-2 | — | — | — | — | — | — | — | — | — | — | — | — | — | — | — | — | — |
| NHL totals | | | 10 | 1 | 7 | 2 | 568 | 47 | 0 | 4.97 | .857 | — | — | — | — | — | — | — | — |
| USSR totals | | | 437 | — | — | — | 25,424 | 1284 | — | 3.03 | — | — | — | — | — | — | — | — | — |

=== International ===
| Year | Team | Event | GP | W | L | T | MIN | GA | SO | GAA | SV% |
|---|---|---|---|---|---|---|---|---|---|---|---|
| 1977 | Soviet Union | WJC | 2 | — | — | — | 80 | 4 | 0 | 3.00 | — |
| 1978 | Soviet Union | WJC | 3 | 1 | 0 | 0 | 110 | 3 | 0 | 1.63 | — |
| 1985 | Soviet Union | WC | 1 | 0 | 0 | 0 | 20 | 3 | 0 | 9.00 | — |
| 1986 | Soviet Union | WC | 3 | 3 | 0 | 0 | 180 | 4 | 0 | 1.33 | — |
| 1987 | Soviet Union | WC | 0 | 0 | 0 | 0 | 0 | 0 | 0 | - | — |
| 1987 | Soviet Union | CC | 6 | 5 | 1 | 0 | 365 | 18 | 1 | 3.00 | — |
| 1988 | Soviet Union | OLY | 8 | 7 | 1 | 0 | 480 | 13 | 2 | 1.62 | — |
| 1989 | Soviet Union | WC | 7 | 7 | 0 | 0 | 420 | 11 | 1 | 1.57 | — |
| 1990 | Soviet Union | WC | 5 | 4 | 1 | 0 | 280 | 8 | 1 | 1.71 | — |
| Junior totals | | | 5 | — | — | — | 190 | 7 | 0 | 2.21 | — |
| Senior totals | | | 30 | 26 | 3 | 0 | 1745 | 57 | 5 | 1.96 | — |
