= Igor Stelnov =

Russian ice hockey player

- Born: February 12, 1963; Moscow, Soviet Union
- Died: March 24, 2009 (aged 46); Moscow, Russia
- Height: 6 ft 00 in (183 cm)
- Weight: 207 lb (94 kg; 14 st 11 lb)
- Position: Defence
- Shot: Left
- Played for: HC CSKA Moscow (Russia); A. S. Asiago Hockey (Italy); Rögle BK (Sweden); Khimik Voskresensk (Russia)
- National team: Russia
- Playing career: 1981–1994; 1997–1998

Igor Anatolievich Stelnov (Russian: Игорь Анатольевич Стельнов "Igor Styelnov") (b. February 12, 1963, in Moscow, Russian SFSR, Soviet Union - d. March 24, 2009, in Moscow, Russia) was a Russian ice hockey player who played in the Soviet Hockey League. He played for HC CSKA Moscow. He was inducted into the Russian and Soviet Hockey Hall of Fame in 1984. Olympic and World champion. 8-times champion of USSR (1982, 1983, 1984, 1985, 1986, 1988, 1989, 1990).

On the international stage, Stelnov won two gold medals (1984, 1988) in the Olympics, and one gold (1986) and one silver (1987) in the World Championships.

Stelnov died on March 24, 2009, after a long illness.

== Career statistics ==
=== Regular season and playoffs ===
			Regular season					Playoffs
Season	Team	League	GP	G	A	Pts	PIM	GP	G	A	Pts	PIM
1980–81	CSKA Moscow	USSR	3	0	0	0	0	—	—	—	—	—
1981–82	CSKA Moscow	USSR	34	3	0	3	12	—	—	—	—	—
1982–83	CSKA Moscow	USSR	39	3	3	6	8	—	—	—	—	—
1983–84	CSKA Moscow	USSR	40	3	4	7	28	—	—	—	—	—
1984–85	CSKA Moscow	USSR	40	1	6	7	20	—	—	—	—	—
1985–86	CSKA Moscow	USSR	38	2	1	3	16	—	—	—	—	—
1986–87	CSKA Moscow	USSR	37	0	2	2	16	—	—	—	—	—
1987–88	CSKA Moscow	USSR	35	2	4	6	12	—	—	—	—	—
1988–89	CSKA Moscow	USSR	37	1	3	4	10	—	—	—	—	—
1989–90	CSKA Moscow	USSR	40	1	6	7	38	—	—	—	—	—
1990–91	CSKA Moscow	USSR	31	2	1	3	4	—	—	—	—	—
1991–92	Khimik Voskresensk	CIS	13	0	1	1	6	—	—	—	—	—
1992–93	Rögle BK	SEL	33	1	5	6	30	—	—	—	—	—
1993–94	HC Asiago	ITA	14	2	4	6	4	—	—	—	—	—
1996–97	CSKA Moscow	RSL	21	3	6	9	6	—	—	—	—	—
1997–98	CSKA Moscow	RSL	22	2	3	5	20	—	—	—	—	—
USSR/CIS totals			387	18	31	49	170	—	—	—	—	—

=== International ===
Igor Stelnov
Medal record

Representing Soviet Union

Men's ice hockey

Olympic Games
Gold medal – first place	1984 Sarajevo	Ice hockey
Gold medal – first place	1988 Calgary	Ice hockey

World Championships
Gold medal – first place	1986 Soviet Union	Ice hockey
Silver medal – second place	1987 Austria	Ice hockey

Year	Team	Event	GP	G	A	Pts	PIM
1979	Soviet Union	EJC	5	0	1	1	2
1980	Soviet Union	EJC	5	0	0	0	2
1981	Soviet Union	EJC	5	1	4	5	14
1981	Soviet Union	WJC	5	2	0	2	2
1982	Soviet Union	WJC	7	3	6	9	9
1984	Soviet Union	OG	7	0	2	2	7
1984	Soviet Union	CC	6	0	1	1	4
1986	Soviet Union	WC	10	0	0	0	6
1987	Soviet Union	WC	10	1	3	4	8
1987	Soviet Union	CC	8	1	4	5	6
1988	Soviet Union	OG	7	1	1	2	6
Junior totals			27	6	11	17	29
Senior totals			48	3	11	14	37
