= Rostislav Vlach =

Czech ice hockey player

- Born: 23 July 1962 (age 63) Přerov, Czechoslovakia
- Height: 6 ft 0 in (183 cm)
- Weight: 203 lb (92 kg; 14 st 7 lb)
- Position: Center
- Shot: Left
- Played for: TJ Gottwaldov; ASD Dukla Jihlava; JoKP; VHK Vsetín; HK 36 Skalica; HC Opava; HKm Zvolen
- Coached for: VHK Vsetín; HK Nitra; PSG Berani Zlín
- National team: Czechoslovakia and Czech Republic
- NHL draft: 216th overall, 1987; Los Angeles Kings
- Playing career: 1980–2007
- Coaching career: 2005–present

Rostislav Vlach (born 23 July 1962) is a former Czech professional ice hockey player. He competed for Czechoslovakia in the men's tournament at the 1988 Winter Olympics.

== Career statistics ==
=== Regular season and playoffs ===
			Regular season					Playoffs
Season	Team	League	GP	G	A	Pts	PIM	GP	G	A	Pts	PIM
1979–80	TJ Gottwaldov	CZE.2
1980–81	TJ Gottwaldov	TCH	43	14	20	34	43	—	—	—	—	—
1981–82	TJ Gottwaldov	TCH	43	8	8	16		—	—	—	—	—
1982–83	ASD Dukla Jihlava	TCH	44	12	10	22	41	—	—	—	—	—
1983–84	ASD Dukla Jihlava	TCH	36	9	9	18	23	—	—	—	—	—
1984–85	TJ Gottwaldov	TCH	43	11	11	22	46	—	—	—	—	—
1985–86	TJ Gottwaldov	TCH	32	19	7	26		5	1	2	3
1986–87	TJ Gottwaldov	TCH	34	24	12	36	66	7	4	3	7
1987–88	TJ Gottwaldov	TCH	41	22	20	42	48	—	—	—	—	—
1988–89	TJ Gottwaldov	TCH	41	20	18	38	79	—	—	—	—	—
1989–90	TJ Zlín	TCH	51	16	23	39		—	—	—	—	—
1990–91	JoKP	FIN.2	44	33	48	81	83	—	—	—	—	—
1991–92	JoKP	SM-l	37	9	9	18	70	—	—	—	—	—
1992–93	TuS Geretsried	GER.3	33	31	30	61	51	—	—	—	—	—
1993–94	TJ Zbrojovka Vsetín	CZE.2		20	32	52		—	—	—	—	—
1994–95	HC Dadák Vsetín	ELH	44	9	15	24	77	11	2	12	14	24
1995–96	HC Dadák Vsetín	ELH	33	13	15	28	37	10	1	4	5	14
1996–97	HC Petra Vsetín	ELH	41	12	24	36	91	10	4	3	7	6
1997–98	HC Petra Vsetín	ELH	20	3	4	7	27	—	—	—	—	—
1997–98	HK 36 Skalica	SVK	20	5	13	18	14	—	—	—	—	—
1998–99	HK 36 Skalica	SVK	27	8	16	24	30	—	—	—	—	—
1998–99	HC Opava	ELH	18	4	1	5	8	—	—	—	—	—
1999–2000	HK 36 Skalica	SVK	54	12	20	32	89	—	—	—	—	—
2000–01	HK 36 Skalica	SVK	20	5	5	10	26	—	—	—	—	—
2000–01	HKm Zvolen	SVK	34	5	18	23	30	9	0	9	9	6
2001–02	HC Vsetín	ELH	49	18	18	36	60	—	—	—	—	—
2002–03	HC Hamé Zlín	ELH	52	11	25	36	22	—	—	—	—	—
2003–04	HC Hamé Zlín	ELH	51	7	15	22	36	17	1	2	3	16
2004–05	Vsetínská hokejová	ELH	49	4	7	11	68	—	—	—	—	—
2005–06	TJ Valašské Meziříčí	CZE.3	24	10	19	29	12	3	0	2	2	34
2006–07	HC Bobři Valašské Meziříčí	CZE.3	4	1	1	2	8	—	—	—	—	—
TCH totals			408	155	138	293	346	12	5	5	10	—
ELH totals			356	81	124	205	426	58	17	24	41	60
SVK totals			155	35	72	107	189	9	0	9	9	6

=== International ===
Year	Team	Event	GP	G	A	Pts	PIM
1981	Czechoslovakia	WJC	5	3	4	7	2
1982	Czechoslovakia	WJC	7	2	5	7	9
1987	Czechoslovakia	WC	3	0	1	1	2
1987	Czechoslovakia	CC	6	0	1	1	0
1988	Czechoslovakia	OG	8	0	3	3	4
1989	Czechoslovakia	WC	10	0	3	3	10
1997	Czech Republic	WC	8	2	0	2	0
Junior totals			12	5	9	14	11
Senior totals			35	2	8	10	16
