= Petr Vlk =

Czech ice hockey player

- Born: 7 January 1964 (age 62) Havlíčkův Brod, Czechoslovakia
- Height: 6 ft 2 in (188 cm)
- Weight: 194 lb (88 kg; 13 st 12 lb)
- Position: Right wing
- Shot: Right
- Played for: HC Dukla Jihlava; HK 32 Liptovský Mikuláš; HKm Zvolen
- Coached for: HC Dukla Jihlava; HC Olomouc (assistant)
- National team: Czechoslovakia
- NHL draft: 97th overall, 1987; New York Islanders
- Playing career: 1984–2003
- Coaching career: 2002–2019

Petr Vlk (born 7 January 1964) is a Czech former professional ice hockey player. He competed in the men's tournament at the 1988 Winter Olympics.

== Career statistics ==
=== Regular season and playoffs ===
			Regular season					Playoffs
Season	Team	League	GP	G	A	Pts	PIM	GP	G	A	Pts	PIM
1984–85	ASD Dukla Jihlava	TCH	38	17	9	26	30	—	—	—	—	—
1986–87	ASD Dukla Jihlava	TCH	33	17	8	25	62	9	5	3	8
1987–88	ASD Dukla Jihlava	TCH	30	13	9	22		—	—	—	—	—
1988–89	ASD Dukla Jihlava	TCH	31	10	8	18	66	2	1	0	1
1989–90	ASD Dukla Jihlava	TCH	48	19	21	40		—	—	—	—	—
1990–91	ASD Dukla Jihlava	TCH	50	18	24	42	48	7	8	4	12
1991–92	SC Herisau	SUI.2	36	23	30	53	53	5	8	5	13	14
1992–93	SC Herisau	SUI.2	36	30	29	59	62	4	1	2	3	2
1993–94	SC Herisau	SUI.2	28	20	12	32	56	2	1	1	2	0
1994–95	HC Dukla Jihlava	ELH	16	5	8	13	22	—	—	—	—	—
1995–96	HC Dukla Jihlava	ELH	35	11	24	35	96	8	3	3	6	12
1996–97	HC Dukla Jihlava	ELH	50	18	17	35	96	—	—	—	—	—
1997–98	HC Dukla Jihlava	ELH	50	22	24	46	60	—	—	—	—	—
1998–99	HC Dukla Jihlava	ELH	51	7	18	25	102	—	—	—	—	—
1999–2000	HK 32 Liptovský Mikuláš	SVK	55	15	40	55	62	—	—	—	—	—
2000–01	HKm Zvolen	SVK	54	18	46	64	76	9	4	1	5	6
2001–02	HC Rebel Havlíčkův Brod	CZE.3	27	9	16	25	45	3	1	1	2	2
2002–03	HC Dukla Jihlava	CZE.2	6	0	2	2	6	10	1	2	3	14
TCH totals			230	94	79	173	206	18	14	7	21	—
ELH totals			202	63	91	154	376	8	3	3	6	12

=== International ===
Year	Team	Event	GP	G	A	Pts	PIM
1987	Czechoslovakia	WC	10	1	2	3	10
1987	Czechoslovakia	CC	5	2	0	2	2
1988	Czechoslovakia	OG	7	1	3	4	12
1991	Czechoslovakia	WC	10	0	1	1	4
Senior totals			32	4	6	10	28

"Petr Vlk". Elite Prospects.
