= Anders Bergman =

Swedish ice hockey player (1963–2024)

- Born: 6 August 1963 Bollnäs, Sweden
- Died: 25 September 2024 (aged 61)
- Height: 5 ft 10 in (178 cm)
- Weight: 165 lb (75 kg; 11 st 11 lb)
- Position: Goaltender
- Played for: MoDo AIK; Färjestad BK
- National team: Sweden
- Playing career: 1982–1994

Anders Arne Bergman (6 August 1963 – 25 September 2024) was a Swedish ice hockey goaltender who was a member of the Swedish national team at the 1987 Canada Cup and 1988 Winter Olympics, but did not play in either event. He played for Modo and Färjestad throughout his club career. Bergman died on 25 September 2024, at the age of 61.
