= Jiří Šejba =

- Born: July 22, 1962 (age 63) Pardubice, TCH
- Height: 5 ft 10 in (178 cm)
- Weight: 187 lb (85 kg; 13 st 5 lb)
- Position: Forward
- Shot: Left
- Played for: Buffalo Sabres
- National team: Czechoslovakia
- NHL draft: 182nd overall, 1985; Buffalo Sabres
- Playing career: 1979–2000

Jiří Šejba (born July 22, 1962) is a Czech retired ice hockey forward who played eleven games in the National Hockey League for the Buffalo Sabres in the 1990–91 season. The rest of his career, which lasted from 1979 to 2000, was spent in the Czechoslovak and Czech leagues. Internationally Šejba played for the Czechoslovak national team at multiple World Championships, winning gold in 1985, and at the 1988 Winter Olympics.

== Career statistics ==
=== Regular season and playoffs ===
			Regular season					Playoffs
Season	Team	League	GP	G	A	Pts	PIM	GP	G	A	Pts	PIM
1979–80	TJ Tesla Pardubice	CSSR	12	5	4	9	4	—	—	—	—	—
1980–81	TJ Tesla Pardubice	CSSR	28	14	4	18	14	—	—	—	—	—
1981–82	TJ Tesla Pardubice	CSSR	40	24	18	42	33	—	—	—	—	—
1982–83	TJ Tesla Pardubice	CSSR	44	21	18	39	32	—	—	—	—	—
1983–84	TJ Tesla Pardubice	CSSR	44	15	10	25	21	—	—	—	—	—
1984–85	ASD Dukla Jihlava	CSSR	41	19	9	28	40	—	—	—	—	—
1985–86	ASD Dukla Jihlava	CSSR	43	17	9	26	18	—	—	—	—	—
1986–87	TJ Tesla Pardubice	CSSR	34	23	11	34		9	2	6	8
1987–88	TJ Tesla Pardubice	CSSR	23	10	15	25		—	—	—	—	—
1988–89	TJ Tesla Pardubice	CSSR	34	25	17	42	68	10	13	4	17
1989–90	TJ Tesla Pardubice	CSSR	26	11	14	25	23	—	—	—	—	—
1990–91	Buffalo Sabres	NHL	11	0	2	2	8	—	—	—	—	—
1990–91	Rochester Americans	AHL	31	15	13	28	54	14	6	7	13	29
1991–92	Rochester Americans	AHL	59	27	31	58	36	2	0	0	0	0
1992–93	Jokerit	FIN	46	16	10	26	40	3	1	1	2	0
1993–94	HC Pardubice	CZE	41	12	17	29	29	12	0	4	4	32
1994–95	HC Pardubice	CZE	30	12	13	25	60	—	—	—	—	—
1995–96	HC Slovan Bratislava	SVK	36	11	17	28	44	—	—	—	—	—
1996–97	HC Slovan Bratislava	SVK	43	8	23	31		2	3	1	4
1997–98	Essen Mosquitoes	GER-2	60	16	30	46	40	—	—	—	—	—
1998–99	Essen Mosquitoes	GER-2	36	13	11	24	24	11	4	3	7	14
1999–00	Essen Mosquitoes	DEL	50	2	12	14	37	—	—	—	—	—
2000–01	HC IPB Pojišťovna Pardubice	CZE	1	0	0	0	0	—	—	—	—	—
2000–01	HC Hradec Králové, a.s.	CZE-3	6	1	2	3	8	—	—	—	—	—
CSSR totals			369	184	129	313	253	19	15	10	25	—
NHL totals			11	0	2	2	8	—	—	—	—	—

=== International ===
Year	Team	Event	GP	G	A	Pts	PIM
1980	Czechoslovakia	EJC	5	4	2	6	2
1985	Czechoslovakia	WC	9	4	3	7	2
1986	Czechoslovakia	WC	9	2	2	4	6
1987	Czechoslovakia	WC	10	1	3	4	12
1987	Czechoslovakia	CC	5	1	2	3	2
1988	Czechoslovakia	OLY	8	3	1	4	16
1989	Czechoslovakia	WC	10	0	1	1	8
Senior totals			51	11	12	23	46
