= Ladislav Lubina =

Czech ice hockey player (1967–2021)

- Born: 11 February 1967 Dvůr Králové nad Labem, Czechoslovakia
- Died: 13 September 2021 (aged 54)
- Height: 6 ft 1 in (185 cm)
- Weight: 180 lb (82 kg; 12 st 12 lb)
- Position: Left wing
- Shot: Left
- Played for: HC Pardubice; HC Dukla Jihlava; Hockey-Reipas; ESV Kaufbeuren; EV Zug; ESG Sachsen Weißwasser; HC Oceláři Třinec
- National team: Czechoslovakia and Czech Republic
- NHL draft: 216th overall, 1985; Minnesota North Stars
- Playing career: 1984–2008

Ladislav Lubina (11 February 1967 – 13 September 2021) was a Czech ice hockey player and coach. He was drafted by the Minnesota North Stars in the 11th round of the 1985 NHL entry draft, but never played in the National Hockey League (NHL).

== Playing career ==
He started to play ice hockey on high level in town of Hradec Králové, then he came to HC Pardubice in 1984–85 and spent over 20 seasons in Czech Extraliga (Czechoslovak). He played mostly for HC Pardubice, but also played for Dukla Jihlava and HC Oceláři Třinec. Lubina was the top league scorer in 1990–91, with 41 goals in 50 games. He left Extraliga in 2006, after a game between HC Pardubice and HC Slavia Praha. Before death he was coaching HC Chrudim.

== International play ==
Lubina played on 1992 Bronze Medal winning Olympic ice hockey team for Czechoslovakia. He also played in the 1990, 1991, 1992 and 1998 IIHF Men's World Championships and 1987 Canada Cup for the same team.

== Personal life ==
On 11 May 2009, Lubina was sentenced to two years probation for a hit and run. He died on 13 September 2021, from brain cancer.

== Career statistics ==
=== Regular season and playoffs ===
			Regular season					Playoffs
Season	Team	League	GP	G	A	Pts	PIM	GP	G	A	Pts	PIM
1983–84	Tesla Pardubice	TCH Jr	36	38	22	60	—	—	—	—	—	—
1984–85	Tesla Pardubice	TCH	16	2	0	2	4	—	—	—	—	—
1985–86	Tesla Pardubice	TCH	38	4	0	4	—	—	—	—	—	—
1987–88	ASD Dukla Jihlava	TCH	39	12	10	22	—	—	—	—	—	—
1988–89	Tesla Pardubice	TCH	34	17	12	29	43	10	5	4	9	—
1989–90	Tesla Pardubice	TCH	44	19	15	34	30	—	—	—	—	—
1990–91	Tesla Pardubice	TCH	50	41	20	61	56	—	—	—	—	—
1991–92	Hockey-Reipas	Liiga	2	1	0	1	2	—	—	—	—	—
1991–92	ESV Kaufbeuren	1.GBun	50	37	19	56	—	—	—	—	—	—
1992–93	ESV Kaufbeuren	1.GBun	38	18	16	34	39	—	—	—	—	—
1993–94	ESV Kaufbeuren	1.GBun	5	3	1	4	—	—	—	—	—	—
1993–94	HC Pardubice	ELH	28	10	10	20	30	8	1	1	2	22
1993–94	EV Zug	NDA	—	—	—	—	—	1	0	0	0	0
1993–94	HC Martigny	NDB	—	—	—	—	—	4	4	0	4	4
1994–95	ESG Füchse Sachsen	DEL	8	4	1	5	2	—	—	—	—	—
1994–95	HC Pardubice	ELH	14	7	1	8	2	—	—	—	—	—
1994–95	HC Martigny	NDB	—	—	—	—	—	3	6	1	7	2
1995–96	HC IB Pardubice	ELH	40	16	13	29	32	—	—	—	—	—
1996–97	HC IB Pardubice	ELH	50	23	20	43	40	10	3	5	8	8
1997–98	HC Železárny Třinec	ELH	51	23	13	36	49	13	5	8	13	0
1998–99	HC Železárny Třinec	ELH	47	13	22	35	32	9	0	2	2	8
1999–2000	HC IPB Pardubice	ELH	52	22	23	45	52	3	0	0	0	0
2000–01	HC IPB Pardubice	ELH	52	22	14	36	46	7	2	2	4	6
2001–02	HC IPB Pardubice	ELH	52	26	18	44	97	6	2	4	6	2
2002–03	HC ČSOB Pojišťovna Pardubice	ELH	50	20	18	38	81	19	7	7	14	52
2003–04	HC Moeller Pardubice	ELH	35	10	10	20	64	7	4	3	7	4
2004–05	HC Moeller Pardubice	ELH	10	1	0	1	4	—	—	—	—	—
2004–05	HC Dukla Jihlava	ELH	24	5	3	8	47	—	—	—	—	—
2005–06	HC Moeller Pardubice	ELH	49	5	10	15	38	—	—	—	—	—
2006–07	HC Chrudim	CZE III	14	3	2	5	20	—	—	—	—	—
2009–10	HC Dvůr Králové nad Labem	CZE IV	2	0	0	0	2	—	—	—	—	—
CHL totals			221	95	57	152	—	10	5	4	9	—
1.GBun totals			93	58	36	94	39	—	—	—	—	—
ELH totals			554	203	175	378	614	82	24	32	56	102

=== International ===
Olympic medal record

Winter Olympics
Bronze medal – third place	1992 Albertville	Ice hockey

Year	Team	Event	GP	G	A	Pts	PIM
1984	Czechoslovakia	EJC	—	—	—	—	—
1985	Czechoslovakia	WJC	7	4	2	6	6
1985	Czechoslovakia	EJC	—	6	2	8	—
1986	Czechoslovakia	WJC	7	1	5	6	4
1987	Czechoslovakia	WJC	7	4	6	10	0
1987	Czechoslovakia	CC	6	0	1	1	6
1990	Czechoslovakia	WC	10	1	0	1	6
1992	Czechoslovakia	OG	8	2	4	6	2
1992	Czechoslovakia	WC	8	2	2	4	6
1998	Czech Republic	WC	9	3	2	5	8
WJC totals			21	9	13	22	10
Senior totals			51	10	9	19	34
