= Östers IF (ice hockey) =

- City: Växjö, Sweden
- League: (Sweden) Division 2 at time of merger with Växjö IF
- Founded: 1930 (the parent organization)
- Operated: ?–1971
- Affiliate: Östers IF

Championships
- Le Mat Trophy: 0

Östers IF ("Östers Idrottsförening", or simply "Öster") competed in ice hockey until 1971, when their ice hockey department merged with the hockey department of Växjö IK to form Växjö HC. During its existence, Öster's hockey club managed many years of play in the upper tiers of Swedish ice hockey, including one season (1963–64) in Sweden's top league, at the time called Division 1.
