= Växjö HC =

- City: Växjö, Sweden
- League: (Sweden) Division 2 (at time of bankruptcy)
- Founded: 1971
- Operated: 1971–1997

Franchise history
- –1971: Östers IF; Växjö IK
- 1971–1997: Växjö HC

Championships
- Le Mat Trophy: 0

Växjö HC was a Swedish ice hockey club based in Växjö, Småland. The club was founded in 1971 as a merger of the ice hockey sections of Östers IF and Växjö IK. Öster had previously played one season, 1963–64, in Division I when it was the highest tier of ice hockey in Sweden. Växjö IK, meanwhile, had never played in the highest league, but had played several seasons in Division 2, most recently in the 1965–66 season, which at the time was the second-tier league.

For the new joint club's inaugural season in 1971–72, the club took Öster's place in Division 2, and competed as "Växjö HC/Östers IF", finishing third in their group.

Växjö HC would yo-yo in and out of Sweden's second highest league, managing play at that level for the final time in 1977–78. After their relegation in 1978, they remained in the lower levels of Swedish hockey until the club filed for bankruptcy and was dissolved in 1997.

That same year, Växjö Lakers HC was formed, to maintain the presence of a hockey club in Växjö. In 2011, the Lakers would go on to be promoted to what is today called the SHL, bringing top-tier hockey to Växjö for the first time since the 1963–64 season.
