= Jukka-Pekka Seppo =

Finnish ice hockey player

- Born: January 22, 1968 (age 58) Vaasa, Finland
- Height: 6 ft 2 in (188 cm)
- Weight: 207 lb (94 kg; 14 st 11 lb)
- Position: Center
- Shot: Left
- Played for: Tappara; HIFK; HPK; TUTO Hockey; Kassel Huskies; HC Vsetín; Essen Mosquitoes
- National team: Finland
- NHL draft: 23rd overall, 1986; Philadelphia Flyers
- Playing career: 1985–2002

Jukka-Pekka Seppo (born January 22, 1968) is a Finnish former professional ice hockey player who primarily played in the Finnish Liiga and German Deutsche Eishockey Liga (DEL). Seppo was drafted in the second round of the 1986 NHL entry draft by the Philadelphia Flyers, but he never played professionally in North America. He spent most of his professional career in Finland, playing ten seasons in the Liiga including six seasons with HIFK.

== Career statistics ==
			Regular season					Playoffs
Season	Team	League	GP	G	A	Pts	PIM	GP	G	A	Pts	PIM
1985–86	Vaasan Sport	II-Divisioona	21	20	20	40	46	—	—	—	—	—
1986–87	Tappara	Liiga	39	11	16	27	50	9	1	4	5	14
1987–88	Vaasan Sport	I-Divisioona	43	28	37	65	78	—	—	—	—	—
1988–89	HIFK	Liiga	35	7	13	20	28	2	2	1	3	2
1989–90	HIFK	Liiga	39	15	27	42	50	—	—	—	—	—
1990–91	HIFK	Liiga	35	17	22	39	81	1	1	0	1	0
1991–92	HIFK	Liiga	43	16	31	47	53	7	2	4	6	33
1992–93	HIFK	Liiga	45	16	17	33	52	4	0	1	1	2
1993–94	HPK	Liiga	39	10	12	22	56	—	—	—	—	—
1994–95	TUTO Hockey	Liiga	46	18	33	51	44	—	—	—	—	—
1994–95	VEU Feldkirch	EBEL	5	3	2	5	—	—	—	—	—	—
1995–96	TUTO Hockey	Liiga	49	15	21	36	75	—	—	—	—	—
1996–97	Kassel Huskies	DEL	48	22	23	45	28	10	0	6	6	20
1997–98	Kassel Huskies	DEL	36	10	15	25	18	4	3	1	4	4
1998–99	Kassel Huskies	DEL	16	2	4	6	22	—	—	—	—	—
1999–2000	HC Vsetín	ELH	3	1	1	2	0	—	—	—	—	—
1999–2000	Essen Mosquitoes	DEL	37	13	10	23	54	—	—	—	—	—
2000–01	Sterzing/Vipiteno	Serie A	40	19	24	43	55	—	—	—	—	—
2001–02	HIFK	Liiga	24	4	17	21	30	—	—	—	—	—
Liiga totals			394	129	209	338	519	30	10	14	24	63
