= Luděk Čajka =

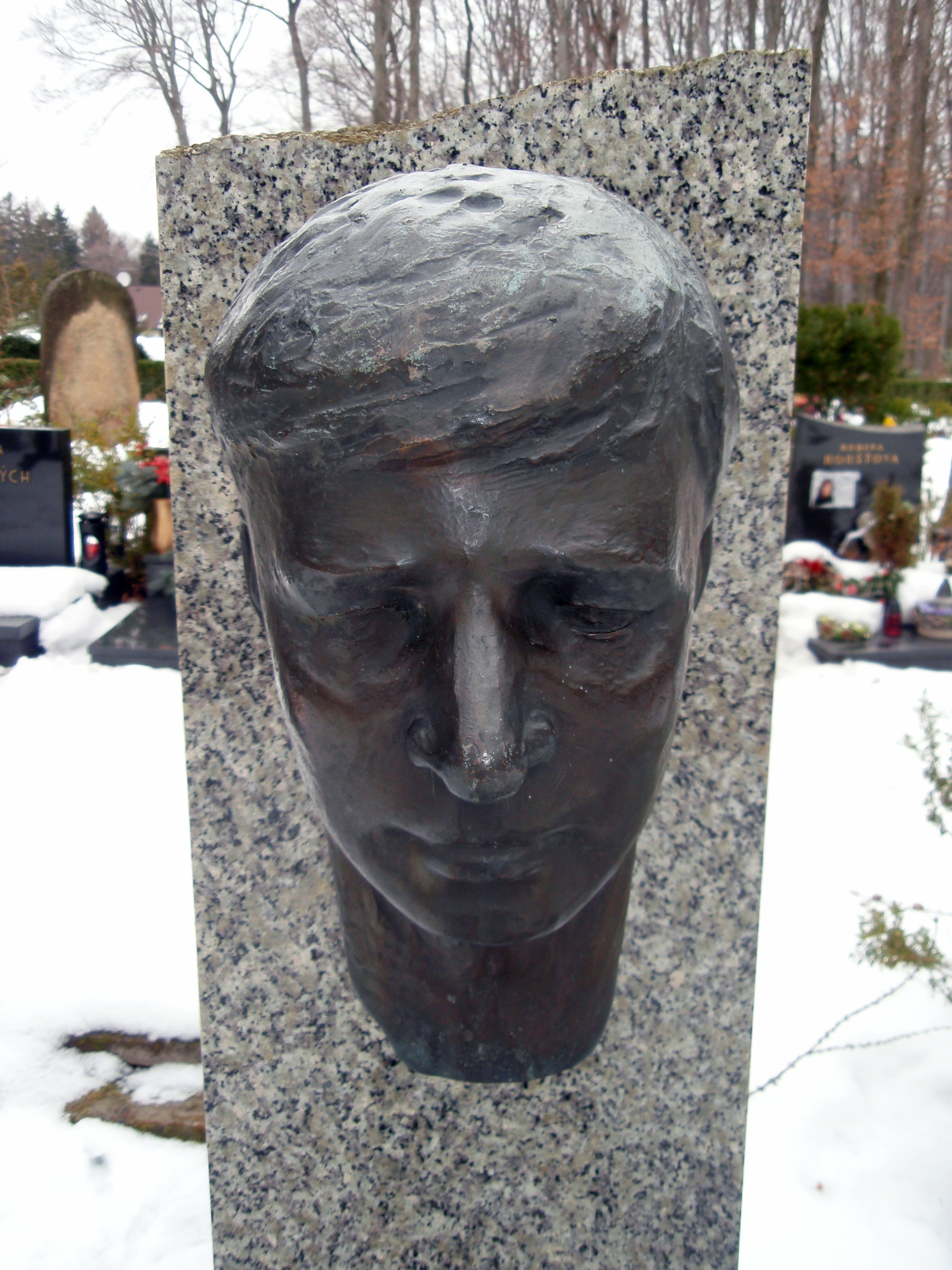
- Born: 3 November 1963 Český Těšín, Czechoslovakia
- Died: 14 February 1990 (aged 26) Košice, Czechoslovakia
- Height: 6 ft 3 in (191 cm)
- Weight: 196 lb (89 kg; 14 st 0 lb)
- Position: Defence
- Shot: Right
- Played for: TJ Gottwaldov; HC Dukla Jihlava; HC Zlín
- National team: Czechoslovakia
- NHL draft: 115th overall, 1987; New York Rangers
- Playing career: 1982–1990

Luděk Čajka (3 November 1963 – 14 February 1990) was a Czechoslovak professional ice hockey defenceman.

Čajka was drafted 115th overall by the New York Rangers in the 1987 NHL entry draft but never played in North America. He played in the Czechoslovak League for TJ Gottwaldov, HC Dukla Jihlava and HC Zlín (formerly Gottwaldov). He also represented Czechoslovakia in the 1987 World Ice Hockey Championships, winning a bronze medal.

On 6 January 1990, Čajka suffered severe spinal injuries after colliding with Anton Bartanus of VSŽ Košice and crashing into the boards in an icing situation during Zlín's game against VSŽ Košice. The injury left Čajka paralyzed and in a coma where he died on 14 February 1990. Zlín's stadium was renamed Zimní stadion Luďka Čajky in his honour.

His death led to the development of automatic, or "no-touch" icing, in which the violation is called automatically once the puck crosses the goal line.
