= Peter Lindmark =

Swedish ice hockey player

- Born: 8 November 1956 (age 69) Kiruna, Sweden
- Height: 5 ft 10 in (178 cm)
- Weight: 178 lb (81 kg; 12 st 10 lb)
- Position: Goaltender
- Caught: Left
- Played for: Timrå IK; Färjestads BK; Malmö Redhawks
- National team: Sweden
- Playing career: 1981–1999

Olympic medal record

Men's Ice hockey
Bronze medal – third place	1988 Calgary	Team competition

Peter "Pekka" Lindmark (born 8 November 1956) is a Swedish former ice hockey goaltender. During his career he represented three teams in Elitserien: Timrå IK, Färjestads BK and Malmö Redhawks.

He also had a successful international career, representing the Swedish National Team in several international tournaments, including the World Championships (where he won a gold medal in 1987), and the Canada Cup in 1981, 1984 and 1987. He was also awarded the IIHF (International Ice Hockey Federation) award for best goaltender in the world twice (1981 and 1986).

== Awards ==
- Caps: 174
- Two time World champion: 1987 and 1991
- 1984 Canada Cup runner up
- 1992 European club champion with Malmö IF
- Four time Swedish champion (1986 & 1988 with Färjestads BK and 1992 & 1994 with Malmö IF)

Preceded by Mats Näslund	Guldpucken; 1981	Succeeded by Patrik Sundström
