= Per-Erik Johnsson =

Swedish ice hockey coach (born 1958)

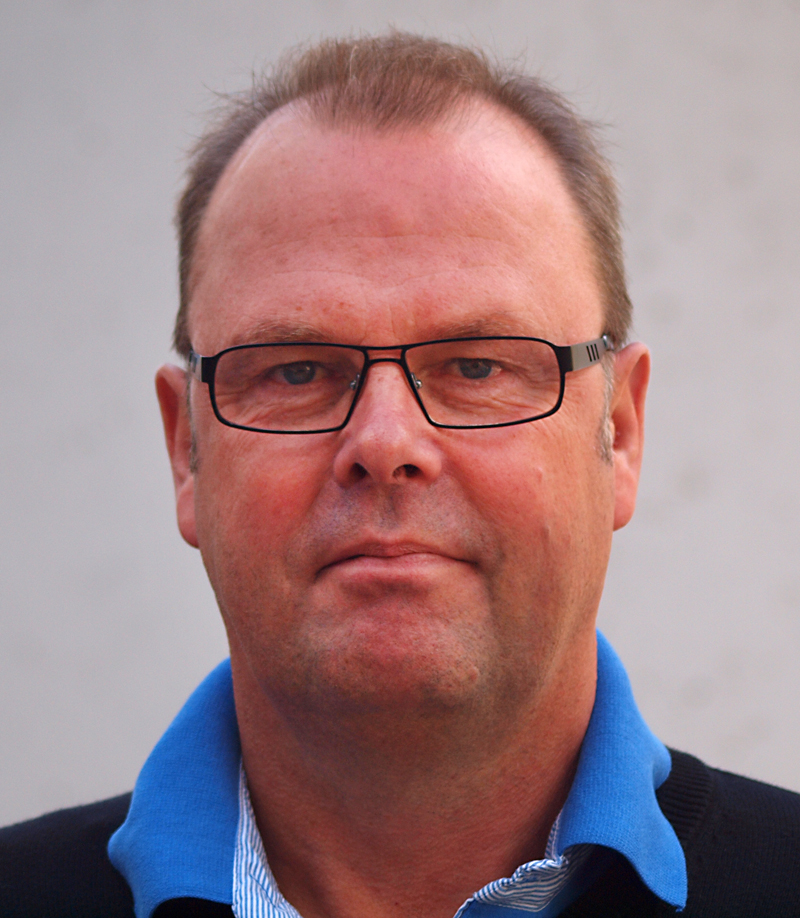
- Per-Erik Johnsson in September 2010
- Born: December 4, 1958 (age 67); Karlstad, Sweden
- Citizenship: Sweden
- Occupation: Ice hockey coach
- Years active: 1999 to present
- Employer(s): Färjestad BK; Skellefteå AIK; Timrå IK; AIK IF
- Organization: Swedish Hockey League

Per-Erik Johnsson (born December 4, 1958) is a Swedish ice hockey coach. He has been a head coach in the Swedish Hockey League (formerly Elitserien) with Färjestad BK, Skellefteå AIK, Timrå IK, and AIK IF.
