= 1976–77 Division 1 season (Swedish ice hockey) =

- League: Division 1
- Sport: Ice hockey
- Number of teams: 48
- Promoted to Division 1: Djurgårdens IF; Timrå IK to Elitserien
- Relegated to Division 2: Järveds IF; CRIF; Bollnäs IS; IF Tunabro; Ljusne AIK; IK Vita Hästen; IK Göta; Nynäshamns IF; IF Troja; Tyringe SoSS; Tranås AIF

Division 1 seasons
- ← 1975–76 1977–78 →

1976–77 was the second season that Division 1 operated as the second tier of ice hockey in Sweden, below the top-flight Elitserien (now the SHL).

Division 1 was divided into four starting groups, based on geography. The top four teams in the group would continue to the playoffs to determine which clubs would participate in the qualifier for promotion to Elitserien. The bottom two/three teams in each group were relegated to Division 2 for the 1977–78 season.

== Regular season ==
=== Northern Group ===
	Club	GP	W	T	L	GF	GA	Pts
1.	Timrå IK	22	22	0	0	167	50	43
2.	Kiruna AIF	22	15	3	4	124	61	33
3.	Bodens BK	22	13	3	6	107	93	29
4.	IFK Kiruna	22	12	4	6	117	80	28
5.	IFK Luleå	22	13	2	7	110	90	28
6.	Örnsköldsviks SK	22	8	4	10	82	118	20
7.	Piteå IF	22	8	2	12	87	105	18
8.	Tegs SK	22	6	4	12	98	115	16
9.	Östersunds IK	22	6	4	12	78	110	16
10.	Sundsvall/Tunadal	22	6	1	15	66	103	13
11.	Järveds IF	22	4	4	14	71	117	12
12.	CRIF	22	2	3	17	70	135	7

=== Western Group ===
	Club	GP	W	T	L	GF	GA	Pts
1.	KB Karlskoga	22	18	2	2	181	70	38
2.	Mora IK	22	18	1	3	196	66	37
3.	Strömsbro IF	22	16	1	5	144	74	33
4.	Hofors IK	22	14	3	5	115	93	31
5.	Grums IK	22	10	3	9	101	98	23
6.	Malungs IF	22	10	3	9	78	94	23
7.	Falu IF	22	10	0	12	134	145	20
8.	Fagersta AIK	22	8	1	13	107	105	17
9.	Avesta BK	22	7	1	14	87	140	15
10.	Bollnäs IS	22	6	1	15	99	170	13
11.	IF Tunabro	22	4	2	16	68	120	10
12.	Ljusne AIK	22	1	2	19	58	193	4

=== Eastern Group ===
	Club	GP	W	T	L	GF	GA	Pts
1.	Djurgårdens IF	33	28	2	3	285	96	58
2.	Huddinge IK	33	25	4	4	174	110	54
3.	Hammarby IF	33	20	3	10	160	94	43
4.	Almtuna IS	33	17	1	15	152	146	35
5.	Linköpings HC	33	16	3	14	131	133	35
6.	NSA-76	33	17	1	15	127	135	35
7.	Västerås IK	33	14	4	15	145	118	32
8.	Surahammars IF	33	13	3	17	150	178	29
9.	Väsby IK	33	11	2	20	151	185	24
10.	IK Vita Hästen	33	9	4	20	130	177	22
11.	IK Göta	33	7	5	21	92	175	19
12.	Nynäshamns IF	33	4	2	27	92	242	10

=== Southern Group ===
	Club	GP	W	T	L	GF	GA	Pts
1.	HV71	33	24	2	7	224	101	50
2.	Tingsryds AIF	33	23	3	7	201	121	49
3.	IFK Bäcken	33	22	3	8	185	135	47
4.	Halmstads HK	33	21	3	9	177	127	45
5.	Karlskrona IK	33	17	7	9	134	117	41
6.	Nybro IF	33	15	8	10	156	111	38
7.	Boro/Landsbro IF	33	11	5	17	127	166	27
8.	Malmö IF	33	9	8	16	132	150	26
9.	Tibro IK	33	8	8	17	129	160	24
10.	IF Troja	33	9	3	21	134	191	21
11.	Tyringe SoSS	33	7	7	19	97	178	21
12.	Tranås AIF	33	0	7	26	107	247	7

== Playoffs ==
=== North/West ===
==== First round ====
- Timrå IK - Strömsbro IF 2:0 (8:3, 5:2)
- Kiruna AIF - Hofors IK 2:0 (9:0, 5:4)
- KB Karlskoga - Bodens BK 2:0 (11:0, 7:4)
- Mora IK - IFK Kiruna 2:0 (6:3, 4:0)

==== Second round ====
- Timrå IK - Mora IK 2:1 (8:4, 2:4, 7:1)
- KB Karlskoga - Kiruna AIF 2:1 (5:2, 0:6, 7:5)

=== South/East ===
==== First round ====
- Djurgårdens IF - IFK Bäcken 2:0 (5:4, 5:1)
- Huddinge IK - Halmstads HK 2:0 (10:6, 6:2)
- HV71 - Hammarby IF 2:1 (7:1, 2:3, 6:3)
- Tingsryds AIF - Almtuna IS 2:0 (6:2, 6:5)

==== Second round ====
- Djurgårdens IF - Tingsryds AIF 2:0 (2:1, 3:2)
- HV71 - Huddinge IK 2:1 (6:2, 2:4, 4:3)
