= 1977–78 Division 1 season (Swedish ice hockey) =

- League: Division 1
- Sport: Ice hockey
- Number of teams: 40
- Promoted to Division 1: Örebro IK to Elitserien
- Relegated to Division 2: Örnsköldsviks SK; Hofors IK; Avesta BK; Mälarhöjden BIK; Surahammars IF; Tibro IK; Växjö HC

Division 1 seasons
- ← 1976–77 1978–79 →

1977–78 was the third season that Division 1 operated as the second tier of ice hockey in Sweden, below the top-flight Elitserien (now the Swedish Hockey League).

Division 1 was divided into four starting groups, based on geography. The top four teams in the group would continue to the playoffs to determine which clubs would participate in the qualifier for promotion to Elitserien. The bottom one/two teams in each group were relegated to Division 2 for the 1978–79 season.

== Regular season ==
=== Northern Group ===
	Club	GP	W	T	L	GF	GA	Pts
1.	IF Björklöven	27	23	1	3	192	88	47
2.	IFK Kiruna	27	20	2	5	156	78	42
3.	Kiruna AIF	27	18	1	8	154	79	37
4.	Bodens BK	27	15	0	12	122	118	30
5.	GroKo Hockey	27	13	2	12	136	134	28
6.	Piteå IF	27	10	3	14	110	145	23
7.	Tegs SK	27	10	1	16	113	126	21
8.	Kågedalens AIF	27	9	1	17	101	162	19
9.	Sundsvall/Tunadal	27	8	2	17	111	146	18
10.	Örnsköldsviks SK	27	2	1	24	64	203	5

=== Western Group ===
	Club	GP	W	T	L	GF	GA	Pts
1.	Mora IK	27	24	1	2	216	73	49
2.	KB Karlskoga	27	21	2	4	160	76	44
3.	Strömsbro IF	27	13	5	9	126	134	31
4.	Fagersta AIK	27	13	4	10	128	124	30
5.	Malungs IF	27	13	2	12	100	116	28
6.	Grums IK	27	10	2	15	107	118	22
7.	Ludvika HC	27	9	4	14	93	105	22
8.	Falu IF	27	8	4	15	108	160	20
9.	Hofors IK	27	7	2	18	87	143	16
10.	Avesta BK	27	3	2	22	94	170	8

=== Eastern Group ===
	Club	GP	W	T	L	GF	GA	Pts
1.	Örebro IK	36	29	5	2	244	95	63
2.	Huddinge IK	36	21	8	7	167	92	50
3.	Hammarby IF	36	22	6	8	156	106	50
4.	Väsby IK	36	16	7	13	170	160	39
5.	Almtuna IS	36	15	4	17	147	159	34
6.	NSA-76	36	11	6	19	100	135	28
7.	Västerås IK	36	12	3	21	116	141	27
8.	Linköpings HC	36	11	4	21	110	154	26
9.	Mälarhöjden BIK	36	10	4	22	117	175	24
10.	Surahammars IF	36	8	3	25	126	236	19

=== Southern Group ===
	Club	GP	W	T	L	GF	GA	Pts
1.	Tingsryds AIF	27	22	0	5	171	91	44
2.	HV71	27	19	2	6	162	92	40
3.	Nybro IF	27	16	4	7	128	74	36
4.	IFK Bäcken	27	15	3	9	124	114	33
5.	Boro/Landsbro IF	27	12	3	12	117	146	27
6.	Halmstads HK	27	10	5	12	107	116	25
7.	Malmö IF	27	11	1	15	103	116	23
8.	Karlskrona IK	27	10	1	16	108	117	21
9.	Tibro IK	27	4	4	19	91	179	12
10.	Växjö HC	27	3	3	21	70	137	9

== Playoffs ==
=== North/West ===
==== First round ====
- IF Björklöven - Strömsbro IF 2:0 (7:2, 2:1 OT)
- IFK Kiruna - Fagersta AIK 2:1 (3:0, 3:4, 5:1)
- Mora IK - Kiruna AIF 2:0 (5:2, 10:0)
- KB Karlskoga - Bodens BK 2:0 (7:3, 5:0)

==== Second round ====
- IF Björklöven - KB Karlskoga 2:0 (11:3, 5:4)
- IFK Kiruna - Mora IK 2:0 (6:5, 5:3)

=== South/East ===
==== First round ====
- Örebro IK - Nybro IF 2:1 (7:0, 3:6, 5:1)
- Huddinge IK - IFK Bäcken 2:0 (9:2, 7:2)
- Tingsryds AIF - Väsby IK 2:0 (7:3, 9:0)
- HV71 - Hammarby IF 1:2 (4:8, 4:1, 3:6)

==== Second round ====
- Örebro IK - Hammarby IF 2:1 (3:5, 2:0, 4:3)
- Huddinge IK - Tingsryds AIF 2:0 (7:2, 8:5)
