= 1978–79 Division 1 season (Swedish ice hockey) =

- League: Division 1
- Sport: Ice hockey
- Number of teams: 39
- Promoted to Division 1: HV71 to Elitserien
- Relegated to Division 2: Sundsvall/Tunadal; Tegs SK; Ludvika HC; Grums IK; IK Westmannia; Nynäshamns IF; Skövde IK; Boro/Vetlanda HC

Division 1 seasons
- ← 1977–78 1979–80 →

1978–79 was the fourth season that Division 1 operated as the second tier of ice hockey in Sweden, below the top-flight Elitserien (now the Swedish Hockey League).

Division 1 was divided into four starting groups, based on geography. The top four teams in the group would continue to the playoffs to determine which clubs would participate in the qualifier for promotion to Elitserien. The bottom two teams in each group were relegated to Division 2 for the 1979–80 season.

== Regular season ==
=== Northern Group ===
	Club	GP	W	T	L	GF	GA	Pts
1.	Timrå IK	24	21	1	2	165	68	43
2.	Kiruna AIF	24	18	2	4	178	67	38
3.	Bodens BK	24	14	3	7	128	94	31
4.	GroKo Hockey	24	13	4	7	122	105	30
5.	Piteå IF	24	9	4	11	119	126	22
6.	IFK Kiruna	24	9	3	12	90	124	21
7.	Kågedalens AIF	24	7	2	15	85	135	16
8.	Sundsvall/Tunadal	24	6	0	18	81	144	12
9.	Tegs SK	24	1	1	22	57	162	3

=== Eastern Group ===
	Club	GP	W	T	L	GF	GA	Pts
1.	Huddinge IK	36	30	2	4	224	121	62
2.	Södertälje SK	36	23	3	10	242	135	49
3.	Hammarby IF	36	21	6	9	150	99	48
4.	Västerås IK	36	21	2	13	179	133	44
5.	Almtuna IS	36	19	5	12	164	131	43
6.	Väsby IK	36	19	2	15	184	161	40
7.	NSA-76	36	9	7	20	139	179	25
8.	Linköpings HC	36	8	3	25	109	201	19
9.	IK Westmannia	36	8	3	25	155	277	19
10.	Nynäshamns IF	36	4	3	29	96	205	11

=== Southern Group ===
	Club	GP	W	T	L	GF	GA	Pts
1.	Karlskrona IK	27	16	6	5	121	89	38
2.	HV71	27	17	3	7	144	92	37
3.	Nybro IF	27	16	2	9	133	75	34
4.	Malmö IF	27	15	2	10	112	94	32
5.	IF Troja	27	11	5	11	125	102	27
6.	IFK Bäcken	27	12	3	12	130	123	27
7.	Tingsryds AIF	27	12	1	14	109	113	25
8.	Halmstads HK	27	7	7	13	99	137	21
9.	Skövde IK	27	7	1	19	113	154	15
10.	Boro/Vetlanda HC	27	6	2	19	91	198	14

=== Western Group ===
	Club	GP	W	T	L	GF	GA	Pts
1.	Mora IK	27	22	1	4	207	93	45
2.	Bofors IK	27	18	2	7	163	91	38
3.	Fagersta AIK	27	17	2	8	120	107	36
4.	Strömsbro IF	27	16	3	8	146	114	35
5.	Falu IF	27	13	2	12	106	104	28
6.	IK Viking	27	9	3	15	95	122	21
7.	Malungs IF	27	9	2	16	85	123	20
8.	IK Rommehed	27	8	3	16	85	138	19
9.	Ludvika HC	27	4	7	16	97	137	15
10.	Grums IK	27	6	1	20	91	166	13

== Playoffs ==
=== North/East ===
==== First round ====
- Timrå IK - Hammarby IF 2:0 (6:3, 7:6 OT)
- Kiruna AIF - Västerås IK 2:1 (3:4, 4:3, 4:0)
- Bodens BK - Södertälje SK 1:2 (5:1, 5:6 OT, 2:4)
- Huddinge IK - GroKo Hockey 2:0 (7:3, 12:3)

==== Second round ====
- Timrå IK - Södertälje SK 1:2 (6:4, 4:5 OT, 6:7)
- Huddinge IK - Kiruna AIF 2:0 (9:2, 3:2)

=== South/West ===
==== First round ====
- Mora IK - Nybro IF 2:1 (10:0, 5:6, 4:3 OT)
- Bofors IK - Malmö IF 2:0 (8:4, 5:4)
- Karlskrona IK - Fagersta AIK 2:1 (7:2, 2:3, 6:2)
- HV71 - Strömsbro IF 2:0 (10:2, 4:3)

==== Second round ====
- Mora IK - HV71 0:2 (5:7, 3:6)
- Bofors IK - Karlskrona IK 2:0 (9:0, 6:3)
