= 1982–83 Soviet League season =

Soviet ice hockey season

The 1982–83 Soviet League Season was the 37th year of competition in the Soviet Championship League. CSKA Moscow won the championship, its 7th in a row and 26th overall.

== Regular season ==
	Club	GP	W	T	L	GF	GA	Pts
1.	CSKA Moscow	44	40	1	3	261	73	81
2.	Spartak Moscow	44	33	3	8	208	122	69
3.	Dynamo Moscow	44	30	6	8	159	93	66
4.	Sokol Kiev	44	22	5	17	163	138	49
5.	Torpedo Gorky	44	16	12	16	138	153	46
6.	Dinamo Riga	44	21	3	20	191	177	45
7.	Krylya Sovetov Moscow	44	15	6	23	113	145	36
8.	Khimik Voskresensk	44	15	6	23	121	165	36
9.	SKA Leningrad	44	12	6	26	140	164	30
10.	Traktor Chelyabinsk	44	11	7	26	100	168	29
11.	Izhstal Izhevsk	44	10	6	28	118	199	26
12.	Salavat Yulaev Ufa	44	7	4	33	111	224	18

== 5th-8th place ==
	Club	GP	W	T	L	GF	GA	Pts
5.	Dinamo Riga	56	27	5	24	240	212	59
6.	Torpedo Gorky	56	21	14	21	184	193	56
7.	Krylya Sovetov Moscow	56	23	7	26	167	184	53
8.	Khimik Voskresensk	56	17	6	33	151	232	40

== Relegation ==
	Club	GP	W	T	L	GF	GA	Pts
9.	Traktor Chelyabinsk	60	21	11	28	175	206	53
10.	SKA Leningrad	60	23	7	30	217	207	53
11.	Izhstal Izhevsk	60	19	8	33	187	245	46
12.	Salavat Yulaev Ufa	60	9	7	44	174	311	25
