= 1985–86 Elitserien season =

- League: Elitserien
- Sport: Ice hockey
- Duration: 19 September 1985 – 27 February 1986

Regular season
- League champion: Färjestads BK

Playoffs
- Finals champions: Färjestads BK
- Runners-up: Södertälje SK

SHL seasons
- ← 1984–85 1986–87 →

The 1985–86 Elitserien season was the 11th season of the Elitserien, the top level of ice hockey in Sweden. 10 teams participated in the league, and Farjestads BK won the championship.

== Standings ==
	Club	GP	W	T	L	GF	GA	Pts
1.	Färjestads BK	36	21	7	8	154	111	49
2.	Södertälje SK	36	21	3	12	167	128	45
3.	HV 71 Jönköping	36	16	6	14	128	118	38
4.	Brynäs IF	36	17	4	15	125	119	38
5.	IF Björklöven	36	15	5	16	150	132	35
6.	Luleå HF	36	15	5	16	135	130	35
7	Leksands IF	36	14	7	15	118	134	34
8.	Djurgårdens IF	36	15	3	18	134	158	33
9.	MoDo AIK	36	12	8	16	134	158	32
10.	AIK	36	8	5	23	100	158	21

== Playoffs ==
Semifinal
1	Färjestads BK	2
4	Brynäs IF	1
2	Södertälje SK	2
3	HV 71 Jönköping	0

Final
1	Färjestads BK	3
2	Södertälje SK	2
