= 1980–81 Elitserien season =

- League: Elitserien
- Sport: Ice hockey
- Duration: 5 October 1980 – 1 March 1981

Regular season
- League champion: Skellefteå AIK

Playoffs
- Finals champions: Färjestads BK
- Runners-up: AIK

SHL seasons
- ← 1979–80 1981–82 →

The 1980–81 Elitserien season was the sixth season of the Elitserien, the top level of ice hockey in Sweden. 10 teams participated in the league, and Farjestads BK won the championship.

== Standings ==
	Club	GP	W	T	L	GF	GA	Pts
1.	Skellefteå AIK	36	22	5	9	166	128	49
2.	AIK	36	21	7	8	156	119	49
3.	Färjestads BK	36	17	6	13	155	120	40
4.	Västra Frölunda IF	36	18	4	14	149	146	40
5.	IF Björklöven	36	17	5	14	139	123	39
6.	Djurgårdens IF	36	15	2	19	141	142	32
7	Brynäs IF	36	13	6	17	130	146	32
8.	MoDo AIK	36	12	3	21	137	163	27
9.	Leksands IF	36	10	7	19	124	160	27
10.	Södertälje SK	36	10	5	21	132	189	25

== Playoffs ==
Semifinal
1	Skellefteå AIK	1
3	Färjestads BK	2
2	AIK	2
4	Västra Frölunda IF	0

Final
3	Färjestads BK	3
2	AIK	1
