= 1981–82 Elitserien season =

- League: Elitserien
- Sport: Ice hockey
- Duration: 4 October 1981 – 7 March 1982

Regular season
- League champion: Färjestads BK

Playoffs
- Finals champions: AIK
- Runners-up: IF Björklöven

SHL seasons
- 1980–81 1982–83

The 1981–82 Elitserien season was the seventh season of the Elitserien, the top level of ice hockey in Sweden. 10 teams participated in the league, and AIK won the championship.

== Standings ==
	Club	GP	W	T	L	GF	GA	Pts
1.	Färjestads BK	36	20	7	9	146	108	47
2.	IF Björklöven	36	19	4	13	143	117	42
3.	AIK	36	15	9	12	136	123	39
4.	MoDo AIK	36	15	7	14	149	135	37
5.	Skellefteå AIK	36	15	6	15	129	111	36
6.	Leksands IF	36	13	10	13	155	162	36
7	Västra Frölunda IF	36	14	7	15	132	123	35
8.	Brynäs IF	36	14	6	16	122	138	34
9.	Djurgårdens IF	36	11	8	17	109	128	30
10.	Timrå IK	36	10	4	22	106	182	24

== Playoffs ==
Semifinal
1	Färjestads BK	0
3	AIK	2
2	IF Björklöven	2
4	MoDo AIK	0

Final
3	AIK	3
2	IF Björklöven	2
