= 1984–85 Elitserien season =

- League: Elitserien
- Sport: Ice hockey
- Duration: 30 September 1984 – 28 February 1985

Regular season
- League champion: Djurgårdens IF

Playoffs
- Finals champions: Södertälje SK
- Runners-up: Djurgårdens IF

SHL seasons
- ← 1983–84 1985–86 →

The 1984–85 Elitserien season was the tenth season of the Elitserien, the top level of ice hockey in Sweden. 10 teams participated in the league, and Sodertalje SK won the championship.

== Standings ==
	Club	GP	W	T	L	GF	GA	Pts
1.	Djurgårdens IF	36	22	5	9	153	113	49
2.	Södertälje SK	36	22	3	11	157	123	47
3.	Färjestads BK	36	19	7	10	161	111	45
4.	IF Björklöven	36	19	7	10	131	110	45
5.	Luleå HF	36	16	5	15	148	150	37
6.	Brynäs IF	36	17	2	17	156	134	36
7	Leksands IF	36	16	3	17	128	144	35
8.	AIK	36	16	1	19	141	146	33
9.	Skellefteå AIK	36	7	10	19	115	166	24
10.	Hammarby IF	36	2	5	29	94	187	9

== Playoffs ==
Semifinals
1	Djurgårdens IF	2
3	Färjestads BK	1
2	Södertälje SK	2
4	IF Björklöven	1

Final
1	Djurgårdens IF	2
2	Södertälje SK	3
