= David Jensen (disambiguation) =

David Jensen (born 1950) is a Canadian-born British radio disc jockey.

David Jensen may also refer to:

- David Jensen (sculptor) (1816–1902), Danish-born Russian sculptor
- David Jensen (ice hockey, born 1961), American ice hockey player who played for the Minnesota North Stars
- David Jensen (ice hockey, born 1965), American ice hockey player who played for the Hartford Whalers and Washington Capitals
- David Jensen (footballer) (born 1992), Danish goalkeeper
