= Dan Held =

Canadian ice hockey player

- Born: November 13, 1961 Calgary, Alberta, Canada
- Died: January 4, 2015 (aged 53) Bietigheim, Germany
- Height: 5 ft 11 in (180 cm)
- Weight: 176 lb (80 kg; 12 st 8 lb)
- Position: Centre
- Shot: Right
- Played for: AHL; Maine Mariners; 1st Bundesliga; Berliner SC; ERC Schwenningen; ECD Iserlohn; Eintracht Frankfurt; ESV Kaufbeuren; 2nd Bundesliga; Heilbronner EC; SC Bietigheim-Bissingen; Deutsche Eishockey Liga; Eisbären Berlin; Augsburger Panther
- National team: West Germany
- NHL draft: 105th overall, 1980; Philadelphia Flyers
- Playing career: 1980–2000

Daniel Held (November 13, 1961 – January 5, 2015) was a Canadian professional ice hockey centre who played the majority of his playing career in Germany. He also played two seasons with the Maine Mariners in the American Hockey League (AHL). He was selected by the Philadelphia Flyers in the 5th round (105th overall) of the 1980 NHL entry draft. He died after an illness, in January 2015.

== Career statistics ==
			Regular season					Playoffs
Season	Team	League	GP	G	A	Pts	PIM	GP	G	A	Pts	PIM
1978–79	Seattle Breakers	WHL	42	11	20	31	40	—	—	—	—	—
1978–79	Langley Thunder	BCJHL	32	20	21	41	17	—	—	—	—	—
1979–80	Seattle Breakers	WHL	71	35	44	79	99	12	4	2	6	14
1980–81	Berliner SC Preussen	Germany	40	22	18	40	94	—	—	—	—	—
1980–81	Billings Bighorns	WHL	16	7	14	21	50	5	4	2	6	4
1981–82	Maine Mariners	AHL	68	12	22	34	44	2	2	1	3	2
1982–83	Maine Mariners	AHL	72	22	35	57	73	17	2	6	8	21
1983–84	Schwenninger ERC	Germany	38	13	10	23	84	—	—	—	—	—
1984–85	Schwenninger ERC	Germany	2	0	0	0	2	—	—	—	—	—
1985–86	ECD Iserlohn	Germany	19	9	12	21	31	—	—	—	—	—
1986–87	ECD Iserlohn	Germany	39	34	23	57	65	—	—	—	—	—
1987–88	ECD Iserlohn	Germany	25	17	17	34	70	—	—	—	—	—
1987–88	Eintracht Frankfurt	Germany	4	3	2	5	8	3	2	2	4	8
1988–89	Eintracht Frankfurt	Germany	36	32	29	61	49	4	1	0	1	8
1989–90	Eintracht Frankfurt	Germany	36	17	20	37	66	3	1	1	2	0
1990–91	Eintracht Frankfurt	Germany	33	19	15	34	30	3	0	0	0	2
1991–92	ESV Kaufbeuren	Germany	38	12	18	30	59	—	—	—	—	—
1992–93	Schwenninger ERC	Germany	41	18	14	32	52	—	—	—	—	—
1993–94	Eisbären Berlin	Germany	43	16	13	29	52	—	—	—	—	—
1994–95	Eisbären Berlin	DEL	39	8	16	24	69	—	—	—	—	—
1995–96	Augsburger Panther	DEL	3	0	1	1	8	—	—	—	—	—
1995–96	Heilbronner EC	Germany2	22	9	9	18	26	7	3	4	7	10
1996–97	SC Bietigheim-Bissingen	Germany3	42	25	61	86	142	—	—	—	—	—
1997–98	SC Bietigheim-Bissingen	Germany2	57	24	22	46	88	—	—	—	—	—
1998–99	SC Bietigheim-Bissingen	Germany3	55	8	27	35	90	—	—	—	—	—
1999–00	SC Bietigheim-Bissingen	Germany2	8	2	1	3	4	—	—	—	—	—
Germany totals			394	212	191	403	662	29	13	15	28	55
