= Nicklas Bäckström =

Swedish ice hockey player (born 1987)

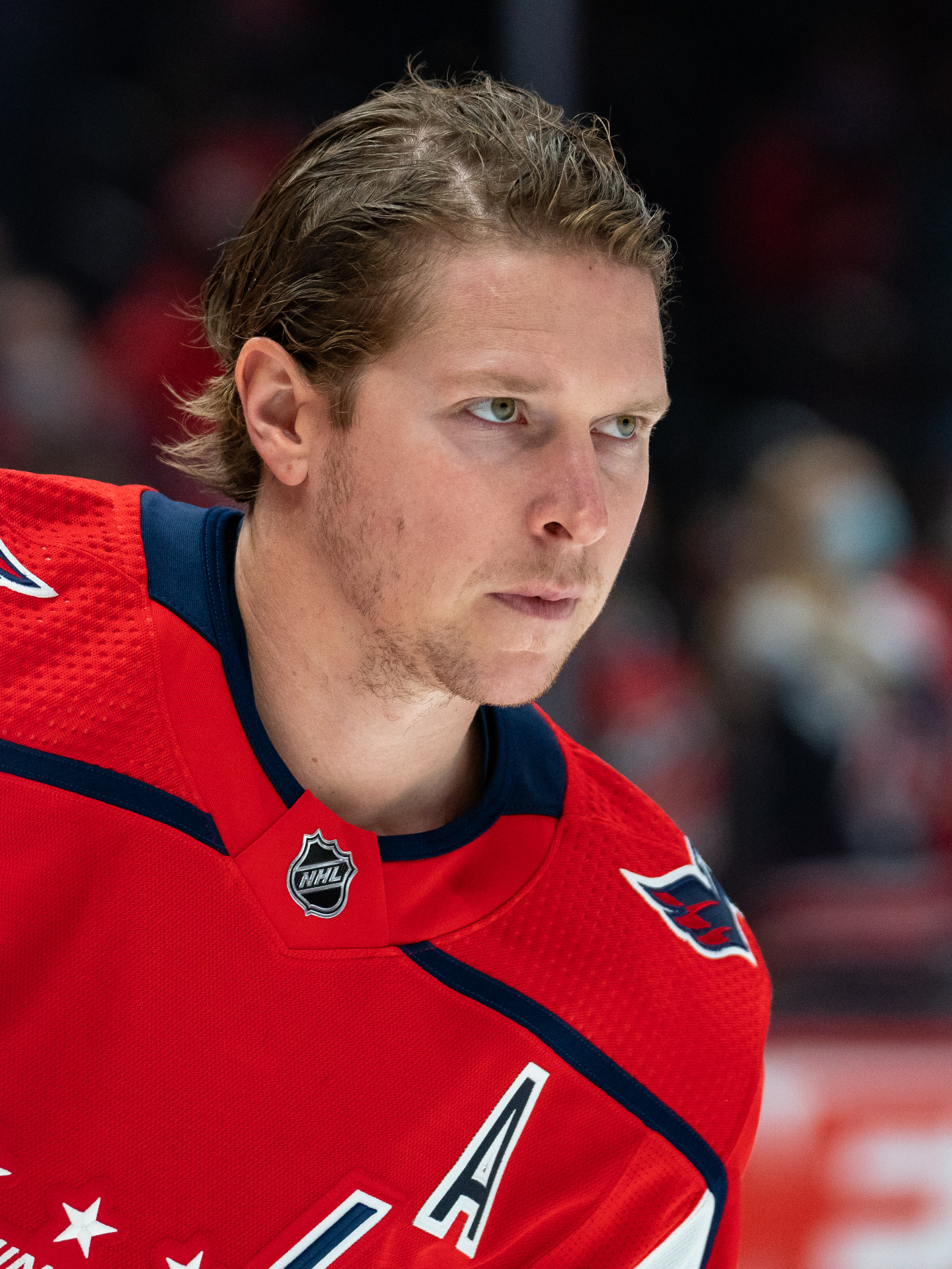
- Bäckström with the Washington Capitals in February 2022
- Born: 23 November 1987 (age 38) Valbo, Sweden
- Height: 6 ft 0 in (183 cm)
- Weight: 214 lb (97 kg; 15 st 4 lb)
- Position: Centre
- Shoots: Left
- SHL team Former teams: Brynäs IF; Washington Capitals; Dynamo Moscow
- National team: Sweden
- NHL draft: 4th overall, 2006; Washington Capitals
- Playing career: 2004–present

Nicklas Bäckström (Swedish: [ˈnɪ̌kːlas ˈbɛ̂kːstrœm]; born 23 November 1987) is a Swedish professional ice hockey player who is a centre for Brynäs IF of the Swedish Hockey League (SHL). Bäckström was selected fourth overall by the Washington Capitals of the National Hockey League (NHL) at the 2006 NHL entry draft and played for the team from 2007 to 2023.

Bäckström is renowned for his elite playmaking abilities, earning him a reputation as one of the league's most skilled passers. Since 2013–14, Bäckström began a streak of six-consecutive 50-assist seasons, one of only 26 players to ever accomplish the feat. He has since gone on to become Washington's second all-time franchise leader in points and assists behind teammate and close friend Alexander Ovechkin. Bäckström won the Stanley Cup with the Capitals in 2018 over the Vegas Golden Knights. He achieved the 1,000th point milestone on 9 March 2022.

== Early life ==
Bäckström was born and raised in Valbo, Sweden. His father, Anders, was a professional ice hockey player, who won a championship with the Brynäs and retired shortly after Bäckström was born. His mother was a handball player in Finland and Sweden.

According to his father, Bäckström "took over a pair of skates" from his older brother Kristoffer at the age of two. By the time Bäckström was three years old, his father claimed "he could skate fully on his own." The "ice barn" in Valbo where he developed his hockey skills as a young boy has been renamed to Nickback Arena. As a young player, Bäckström focused on the mental part of the game. He stated that "I'm not a fast skater, but when I was younger I always wanted to be a smart player and try to read my opponent.”

== Playing career ==
=== Early career ===
After turning 15, Bäckström began his junior career in the 2002–03 season, playing for Brynäs IF of the J20 SuperElit league. After playing parts of three seasons there, in the final of which he had 34 points in 29 games (17 goals and 17 assists), he was called up to play for the club's team in the Elitserien, Sweden's top professional hockey league. In part due to the increased competition brought about by the influx of NHL players into the league (as a result of the 2004–05 NHL lockout), Bäckström was unable to record a point.

In his second season, 2005–06, Bäckström's numbers greatly improved, posting 26 points (10 goals and 16 assists) in 46 games, including a goal in four playoff games. Quickly becoming a first-line centre and a top player on the team, he was named both the Elitserien Rookie of the Year as well as the Swedish Junior Hockey Player of the Year for the first of two times (other notable players to win the latter include Peter Forsberg, Henrik Lundqvist, Daniel Sedin, Henrik Sedin and Niklas Kronwall).

Following his successful campaign, Bäckström was drafted fourth overall by the Washington Capitals at the 2006 NHL entry draft, but announced on 10 July 2006, that he would wait a year before leaving Sweden to play in the NHL. His selection made him the fourth-highest drafted Swede at the time, after Mats Sundin (first), Daniel Sedin (second) and Henrik Sedin (third).

In his third and last season with Brynäs, in 2006–07, Bäckström's development had continued, and he saw improvements in points (12 goals and 28 assists) despite playing in one less game than the previous season. He also improved in post-season play, and was able to record six points (three goals three assists) in seven playoff games.

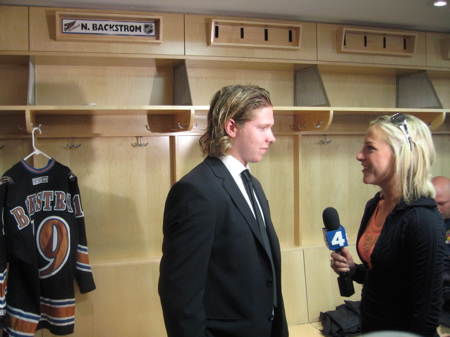
Lindsay Czarniak interviews Bäckström at the press conference announcing his signing with the Capitals in May 2007

=== Washington Capitals ===
==== 2007–2010: Early years with Washington ====
On 21 May 2007, Bäckström signed a three-year, entry-level contract with the Capitals to begin playing during the 2007–08 season. His development and impressive play led some, such as HockeysFuture.com, which ranks NHL prospects, to consider him the most talented Swedish prospect in recent history. Drawing comparisons to Peter Forsberg, he was noted primarily for his vision, passing and ability to maintain possession of the puck in traffic. For these reasons, he was expected to be a catalyst on the team's power play, and his defensive prowess and puck movement would make him an equally valuable asset when short-handed. On 5 October 2007, he scored his first NHL point, an assist on a goal by fellow Swede Michael Nylander, against the Atlanta Thrashers. While Bäckström was decent early in his first season, still adjusting to the smaller ice rinks of North America, his season rapidly improved once an injury to centre Michael Nylander promoted him to Washington's first line. Playing alongside Alexander Ovechkin, Bäckström set NHL and team records while helping Ovechkin win the Art Ross Trophy and the Maurice "Rocket" Richard Trophy.

Playing on the Capitals' top line, Bäckström would finish his rookie campaign with 69 points (14 goals and 55 assists), with three goals and 22 assists on the power play. For his play, he was named runner-up to the Chicago Blackhawks' Patrick Kane for the 2007–08 Calder Memorial Trophy, awarded annually to the League's top rookie of the season (Kane had 1,087 votes to Bäckström's 872). The Blackhawks' other star rookie, Jonathan Toews, placed third in votes with 647. Despite missing out on the award, Bäckström was named to the All-Rookie Team along with Kane and Toews.

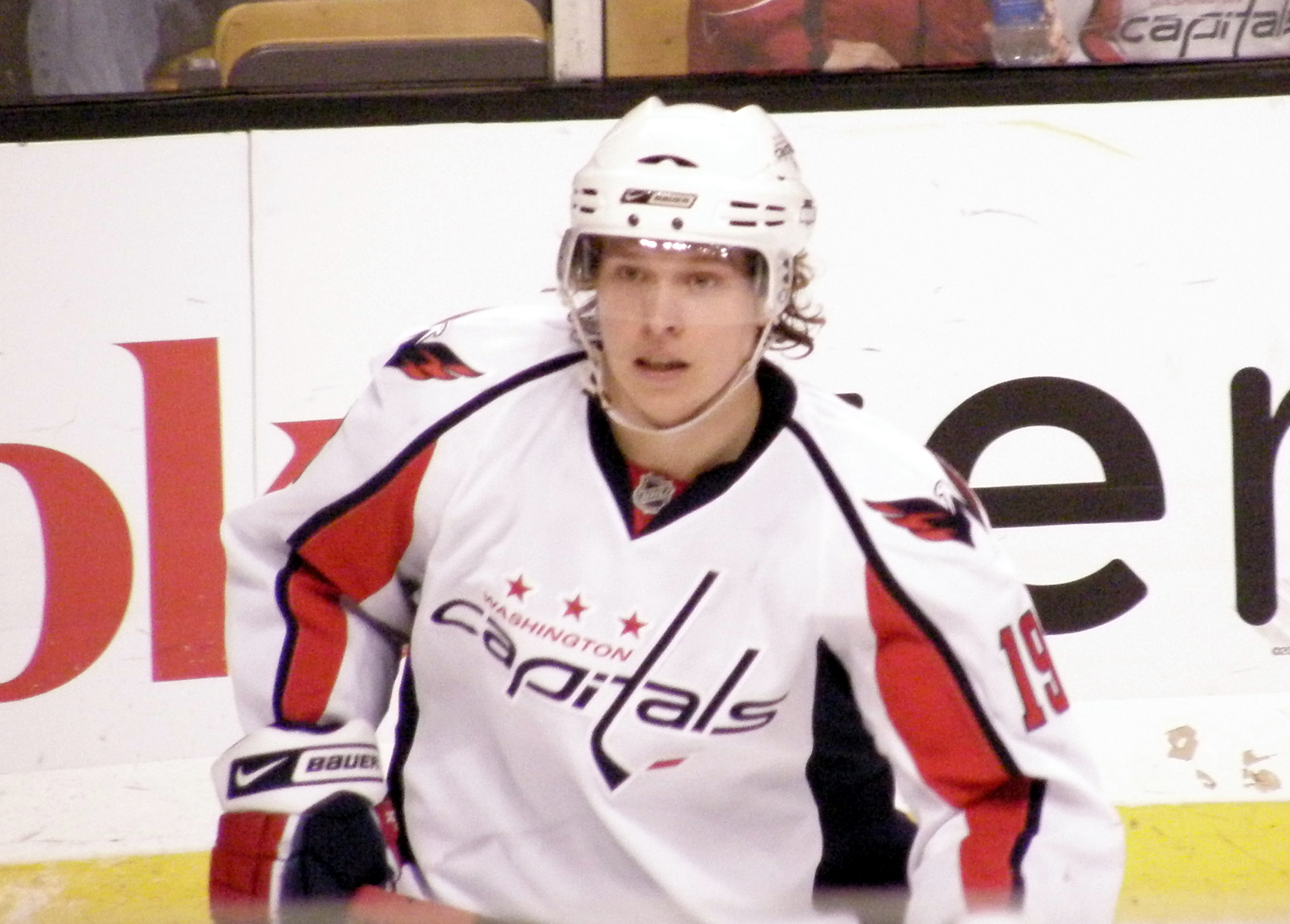
Bäckström with the Capitals in January 2009, during his second season in the NHL

In his second NHL season, 2008–09, Bäckström would go on to lead both the Capitals and all Swedish NHL players with 66 assists, also adding 22 goals, for 88 total points, placing him within the top ten NHL scorers for the year. Bäckström would again prove to be a force in the Stanley Cup playoffs, tallying 15 points in 14 games as Washington eventually fell to the future Stanley Cup champions, the Pittsburgh Penguins, in the Eastern Conference Semifinals. Following the 2009 playoffs, Bäckström was awarded the Viking Award as the top Swedish-born player during the 2008–09 season. He became only the second Capital to ever win the award, following Calle Johansson, who won the award in 1991–92.

At the conclusion of the 2009–10 regular season, Bäckström finished fourth in NHL scoring with 101 points, behind Henrik Sedin (112), Sidney Crosby (109) and teammate Alexander Ovechkin (109). Bäckström scored his first career Stanley Cup playoff hat-trick, including the overtime game-winner, against the Montreal Canadiens in the first round of the 2010 playoffs, a series Washington ultimately lost in seven games. On 17 May, shortly after the end of the Capitals' season, Bäckström signed a ten-year, $67 million contract extension with the team.

==== 2010–2018: Superstardom, Stanley Cup title ====
At the conclusion of the 2010–11 season, Bäckström scored 65 points, his lowest single-season point total in the NHL.

On 17 April 2012, Bäckström received a one-game suspension for a cross-check to the head of Boston Bruins forward Rich Peverley.

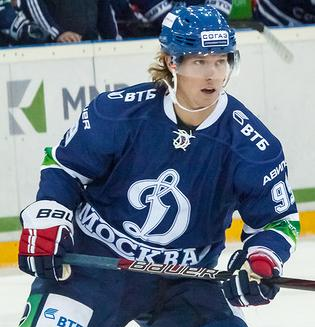
Bäckström in October 2012. He played with Dynamo Moscow during the 2012–13 NHL lockout

During the 2012–13 NHL lockout, Bäckström played for Dynamo Moscow of the Kontinental Hockey League (KHL). On 18 October 2012, he signed with the Russian club, with whom his linemate Alexander Ovechkin had also signed, for the duration of the 2012–13 lockout. Originally given the jersey number 99, he requested to change to a different number out of respect to Wayne Gretzky and was given number 69 by the club. Bäckström later returned to finish third in the NHL with 40 assists during the shortened 2012–13 season.

During the 2014–15 season, on 13 December 2014, Bäckström scored his first regular season NHL hat-trick in a game against the Tampa Bay Lightning. On 15 March 2015, in a game against the Boston Bruins, he became the Capitals' all-time franchise leader in assists, surpassing both Alexander Ovechkin and Michal Pivoňka after recording two in the game. Bäckström finished the season leading the NHL with 60 assists, including 33 on Ovechkin's League-leading 53 goals; Bäckström also finished the year with 78 points, sixth-best in the NHL. On 27 May, Bäckström had successful arthroscopic hip surgery, with Capitals management expectant of a full recovery prior to the beginning of the 2015–16 season, during which he recorded 20 goals and 50 assists as the Capitals were the best team overall during the regular season, and was selected for his first All-Star Game.

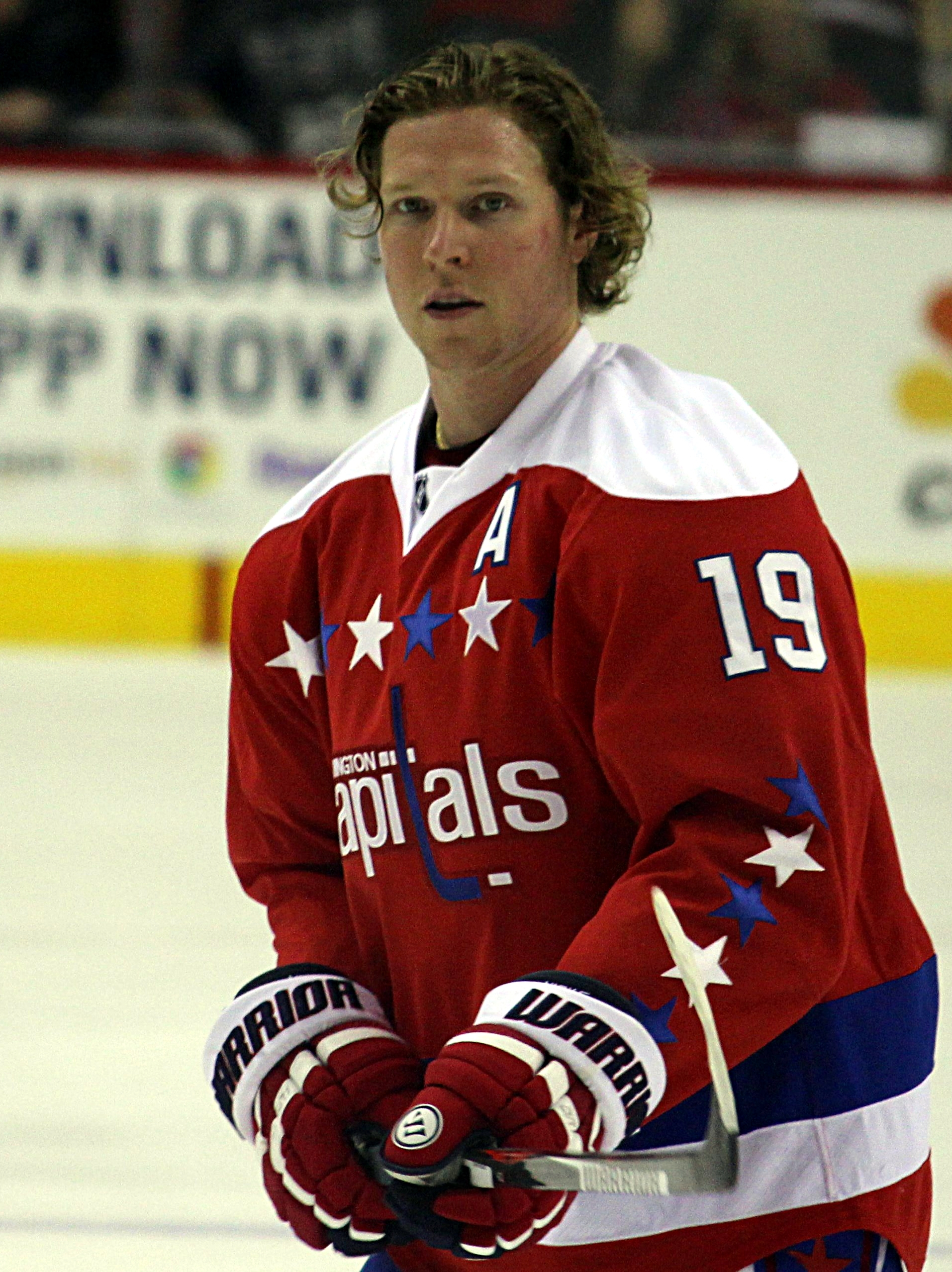
Bäckström warming-up with the Capitals in April 2016.

Bäckström, third on his team with 50 assists during the 2017–18 season, was third on the team with 10 assists during the 2018 playoffs, despite playing with an injury to his hand that kept him out of the first three games of the Eastern Conference Finals. The Capitals announced before Game 4 that he would be back in the lineup for Game 5 against the Pittsburgh Penguins. He left during Game 5 and missed the Game 6 victory in Pittsburgh.

==== 2018–2025: Later years, injuries, early playoff exits ====
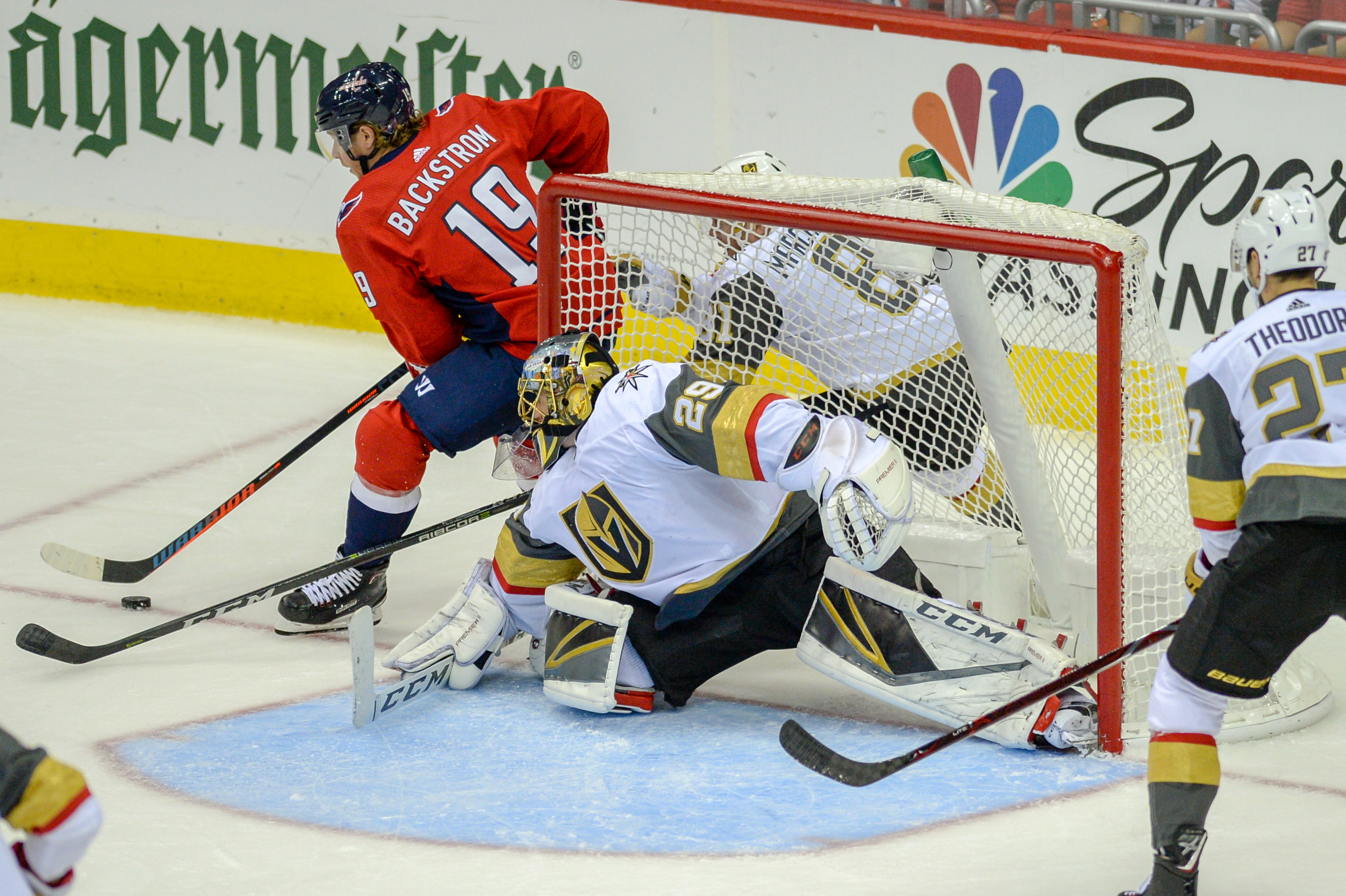
Bäckström setting up for a wrap-around shot attempt on Marc-André Fleury in a game in October 2018

Bäckström reached and surpassed 600 assists in a 23 October 2018 game against the Vancouver Canucks, and became the 87th player in NHL history to reach this mark. A pre-game ceremony was held for Bäckström for reaching 600 career assists on 7 November 2018, before the Capitals' game against the Pittsburgh Penguins. In a 4–1 win against the New York Islanders on 26 November, Bäckström recorded three assists and moved to the second place on the Capitals' all-time points list, passing Peter Bondra. In his next game, on 30 November, versus the New Jersey Devils, Bäckström scored his second career regular season hat-trick. On 11 December, Bäckström had his 12th career four-assist game in a 6–2 win over the Detroit Red Wings, tying him with Gilbert Perreault for eighth in NHL history.

Backstrom ended the 2010s decade with the most assists in the decade (from 1 January 2010 to 31 December 2019) with 512 recorded within that time frame. He also recorded the seventh most points in the decade with 700 points (only behind Patrick Kane, Sidney Crosby, longtime linemate Alexander Ovechkin, Claude Giroux and Steven Stamkos and John Tavares, respectively). On 14 January 2020, the Capitals signed Bäckström to a five-year, $46 million contract extension.

Bäckström reached 700 career assists on 5 March 2021, in a 5–1 loss to the Boston Bruins with an assist on a goal by Jakub Vrána. The assist made him the third active NHL player with 700 assists, along with Joe Thornton and Sidney Crosby.

Bäckström scored his 1,000th career point on 9 March 2022 on an assist to T. J. Oshie against the Edmonton Oilers, becoming the second player in Capitals history to reach that threshold after Ovechkin.

On 18 June 2022, it was announced that Bäckström had undergone hip resurfacing surgery on his left hip, and was expected to be out for the start of the following season. He eventually made his return on 8 January 2023 and played in 39 of the team's 40 remaining games. His return was not enough to save their season, which ended with them missing the playoffs for only the second time since the team changed colors in 2007.

Prior to the 2023–24 season, Bäckström was optimistic he'd return stronger for the Capitals and said he felt 100 percent heading into the season. After eight games, he informed the team his hip was not responding properly and made a decision to step away from the game. For the remainder of his contract, Bäckström remained on the injured reserve, missing the entirety of the 2024–25 season to end his long tenured career with the Capitals.

=== Return to Brynäs IF ===
During the spring and summer of 2025, it was widely speculated that Bäckström was planning to resume his career in Sweden. On 28 July 2025, that was confirmed when Brynäs IF announced that it had signed Bäckström to a contract for one year plus an option.

Bäckström was in attendance at UBS Arena on 6 April 2025 to witness Ovechkin's 895th career goal, which broke Wayne Gretzky's record for the most in NHL history. After the game, Bäckström met with Ovechkin in the guest locker room to congratulate Ovechkin, where the two posed for a picture that saw both players holding the record-breaking puck. After the picture, Ovechkin kissed Bäckström on the cheek.

== International play ==
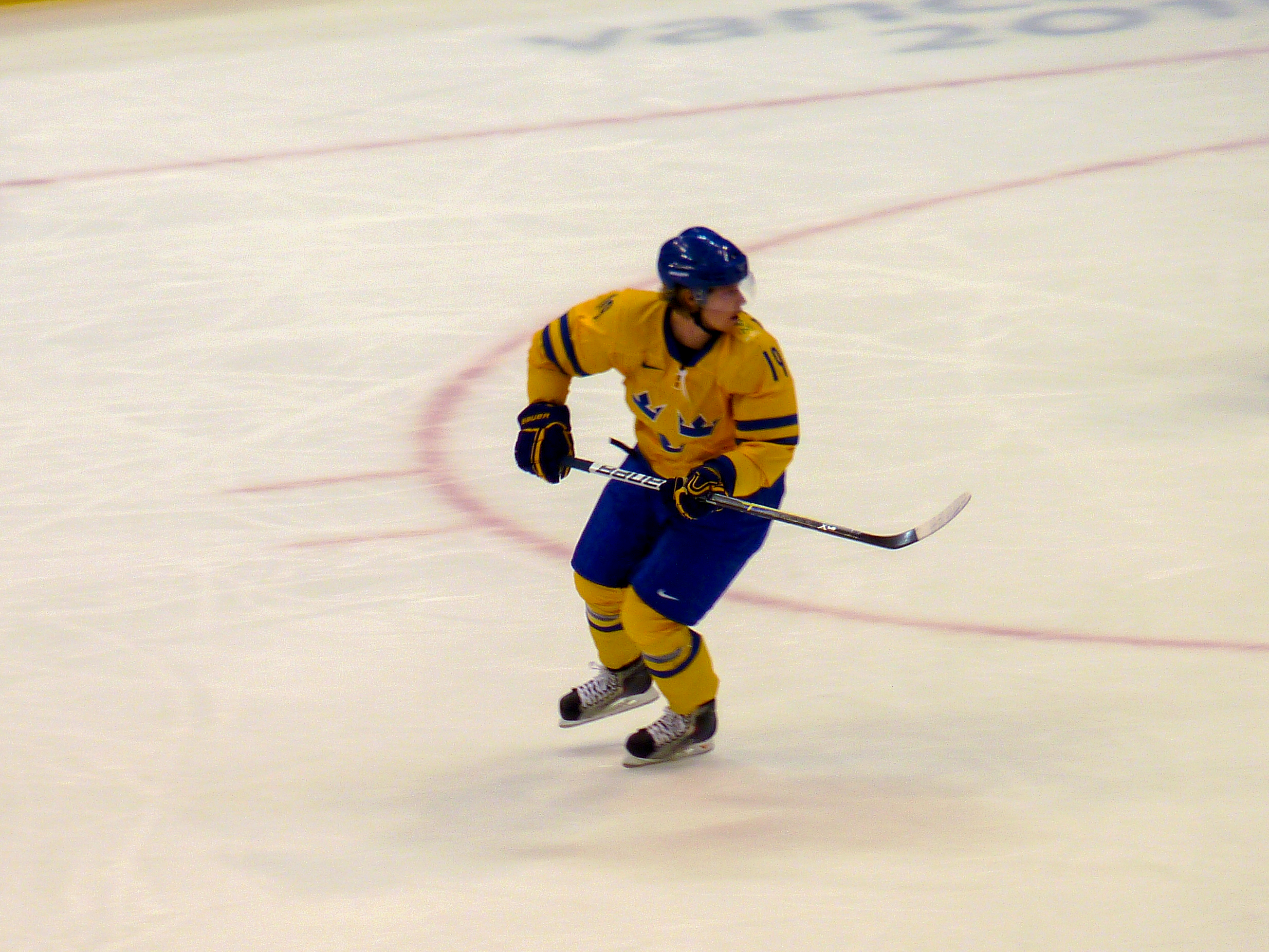
- Bäckström with the Swedish men's national hockey team during the 2010 Winter Olympics

Medal record

Representing Sweden

Men's ice hockey

Winter Olympics
Silver medal – second place	2014 Sochi	

World Championships
Gold medal – first place	2006 Riga	
Gold medal – first place	2017 Germany/France	

World U18 Championships
Bronze medal – third place	2005 Plzeň	

Bäckström played his first game with Sweden on 6 April 2006, in a game against Norway. He won the World Championship when he represented Sweden in the 2006 World Championship. As of that tournament, he is the youngest Swedish player ever in an Ice Hockey World Championship tournament. Bäckström played the last four games in the World Championship (roster spot held open for Daniel Alfredsson) and was directly appointed to the first line together with idols Henrik Zetterberg and Johan Franzén.

Bäckström led Sweden in the 2010 Winter Olympics with six points in four games before they were eliminated by Slovakia in the quarterfinals.

In a drug test at the 2014 Winter Olympics, Bäckström's A-sample indicated doping due to an allergy medication containing pseudoephedrine. He was prevented from playing in the final as a result. The B-sample, analyzed after the final, also showed values above the allowed limit. The International Ice Hockey Federation (IIHF) opposed the decision to stop Bäckström from playing in the final. His silver medal was withheld until the International Olympic Committee (IOC) determined whether or not to award it to him. On 14 March 2014, the IOC Disciplinary Commission decided that Bäckström would be awarded the silver medal. The Commission confirmed the provisional suspension that rendered Bäckström ineligible for the final. However, in November 2014, the World Anti-Doping Agency (WADA) appealed the IOC decision to award Bäckström his silver medal. This appeal was resolved in January 2015 when Bäckström, the IOC, WADA and the IIHF agreed to a settlement in which he accepted a reprimand but was cleared of attempting to enhance his performance.

== Personal life ==
Bäckström's father Anders is a Swedish hockey player who played his career for Brynäs IF, totaling ten seasons for the club. Nicklas' mother Catrin Bäckström (born in Finland) played handball in the Swedish and Finnish Elite League in the late 1970s and early 1980s. Nicklas' older brother Kristoffer is a former professional hockey player, who played the second tier of the Swedish league system with Hammarby IF, and in a German league. Bäckström and his wife, Liza Berg, have three children, two daughters and a son. The family lived in Arlington, Virginia from 2010 to 2020. They moved to McLean, Virginia in 2021, and to Sweden in 2025. Bäckström is a keen football fan and an avid supporter of Arsenal F.C.

Nicklas Bäckström is sometimes confused with another NHL player, former goalkeeper Niklas Bäckström, as their names only differ by a single letter. However, this is coincidental and they are not related. While Nicklas Bäckström is Swedish, Niklas Bäckström hails from Finland.

== Career statistics ==
=== Regular season and playoffs ===
Bold indicates led league

			Regular season					Playoffs
Season	Team	League	GP	G	A	Pts	PIM	GP	G	A	Pts	PIM
2002–03	Brynäs IF	J20	12	1	3	4	2	2	0	0	0	2
2003–04	Brynäs IF	J20	21	4	6	10	4	5	0	1	1	4
2004–05	Brynäs IF	J20	29	17	17	34	24	—	—	—	—	—
2004–05	Brynäs IF	SEL	19	0	0	0	2	—	—	—	—	—
2005–06	Brynäs IF	SEL	46	10	16	26	30	4	1	0	1	2
2005–06	Brynäs IF	J20	—	—	—	—	—	1	0	0	0	2
2006–07	Brynäs IF	SEL	45	12	28	40	46	7	3	3	6	6
2007–08	Washington Capitals	NHL	82	14	55	69	24	7	4	2	6	2
2008–09	Washington Capitals	NHL	82	22	66	88	46	14	3	12	15	8
2009–10	Washington Capitals	NHL	82	33	68	101	50	7	5	4	9	4
2010–11	Washington Capitals	NHL	77	18	47	65	40	9	0	2	2	4
2011–12	Washington Capitals	NHL	42	14	30	44	24	13	2	6	8	18
2012–13	Dynamo Moscow	KHL	19	10	15	25	10	—	—	—	—	—
2012–13	Washington Capitals	NHL	48	8	40	48	20	7	1	2	3	0
2013–14	Washington Capitals	NHL	82	18	61	79	54	—	—	—	—	—
2014–15	Washington Capitals	NHL	82	18	**60**	78	40	14	3	5	8	2
2015–16	Washington Capitals	NHL	75	20	50	70	36	12	2	9	11	8
2016–17	Washington Capitals	NHL	82	23	63	86	38	13	6	7	13	2
2017–18	Washington Capitals	NHL	81	21	50	71	46	20	5	18	23	6
2018–19	Washington Capitals	NHL	80	22	52	74	30	7	5	3	8	4
2019–20	Washington Capitals	NHL	61	12	42	54	14	5	0	1	1	0
2020–21	Washington Capitals	NHL	55	15	38	53	14	5	0	1	1	0
2021–22	Washington Capitals	NHL	47	6	25	31	12	6	2	4	6	4
2022–23	Washington Capitals	NHL	39	7	14	21	14	—	—	—	—	—
2023–24	Washington Capitals	NHL	8	0	1	1	2	—	—	—	—	—
2025–26	Brynäs IF	SHL	45	3	27	30	12	5	0	2	2	0
SEL/SHL totals			155	25	71	96	90	16	4	5	9	8
NHL totals			1,105	271	762	1,033	504	139	38	76	114	62

=== International ===
Year	Team	Event	Results	GP	G	A	Pts	PIM
2005	Sweden	WJC18	3rd place, bronze medalist(s)	7	2	3	5	4
2006	Sweden	WJC	5th	6	4	3	7	2
2006	Sweden	WC	1st place, gold medalist(s)	4	0	0	0	0
2007	Sweden	WJC	4th	7	0	7	7	20
2007	Sweden	WC	4th	9	1	5	6	4
2008	Sweden	WC	4th	9	3	4	7	4
2010	Sweden	OLY	5th	4	1	5	6	0
2012	Sweden	WC	6th	2	0	1	1	0
2014	Sweden	OLY	2nd place, silver medalist(s)	5	0	4	4	0
2017	Sweden	WC	1st place, gold medalist(s)	5	3	4	7	8
Junior totals				20	6	13	19	26
Senior totals				38	8	23	31	16

== Awards and honors ==
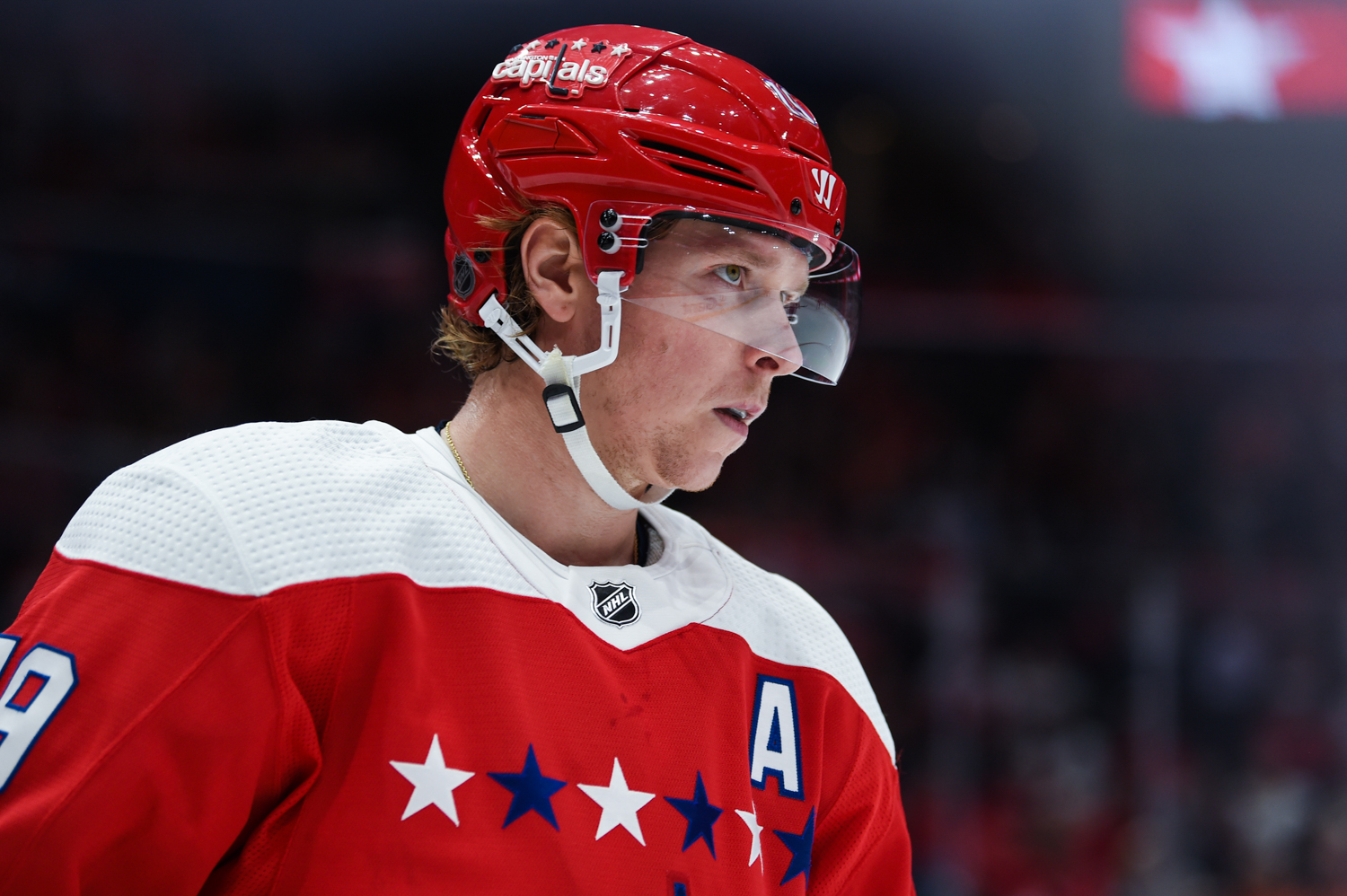
Bäckström played in the 2016 NHL All Star Game while also leading the league in assists in 2015.

Award	Year
SHL
SHL Rookie of the Year	2006
Junior Hockey Player of the Year	2006, 2007
NHL
NHL YoungStars Game	2008
NHL All-Rookie Team	2008
Viking Award	2009, 2015
NHL All-Star Game	2016
Stanley Cup champion	2018

- Bäckström was given the Honorary Ambassador Award at the Swedish Embassy on 28 November 2018; award given annually to "high-profile individual who serves as a good role model for youth." Queen Silvia of Sweden was present at the "In Light of Youth" benefit dinner.

== Records ==
- Youngest Swedish player ever in World Championship (18 years and 6 months).
- First NHL rookie to record four assists in two consecutive games.
- Most assists in a season by a rookie, Washington Capitals team record (56 assists), 2007–08 season.
- Most assists in Washington Capitals franchise with 762.

== See also ==
- List of NHL players with 100-point seasons
- List of NHL players with 1,000 points
- List of NHL players with 1,000 games played

Awards and achievements
Preceded by Joe Finley	Washington Capitals first-round draft pick 2006	Succeeded by Semyon Varlamov
