= Andy Schliebener =

Canadian ice hockey player

- Born: August 16, 1962 (age 63) Ottawa, Ontario, Canada
- Height: 6 ft 0 in (183 cm)
- Weight: 200 lb (91 kg; 14 st 4 lb)
- Position: Defence
- Shot: Left
- Played for: Vancouver Canucks
- NHL draft: 49th overall, 1980; Vancouver Canucks
- Playing career: 1981–1986

Andreas Schliebener (born August 16, 1962) is a Canadian former professional ice hockey defenceman who spent parts of three seasons in the National Hockey League with the Vancouver Canucks during the 1980s.

== Playing career ==
As a youth, Schliebener played in the 1975 Quebec International Pee-Wee Hockey Tournament with a minor ice hockey team from Gloucester, Ontario.

Schliebener was selected by the Canucks 49th overall in the 1980 NHL entry draft from the Peterborough Petes of the Ontario Hockey League. He would make his debut for the Canucks in the 1981–82 season, pressed into service at the age of just 19 due to a rash of injuries on the Canuck blueline. He would play 22 games for the Canucks that season and appear in 3 more games in the playoffs during Vancouver's surprising run to the Stanley Cup Finals, with his solid play earmarking him as a promising player for the future.

However, Schliebener would find himself in the American Hockey League for the entire 1982–83 season. In 1983–84 he found himself back on the Canucks, playing regularly for most of the season. He finished the year with 2 goals and 10 assists for 12 points in 51 games. The following year, though, he was back in the minors and played just 11 games for the Canucks. After another year in the AHL, he retired in 1986 at the age of 24.

Schliebener finished his career with 2 goals and 11 assists for 13 points in 84 NHL games, along with 74 penalty minutes.

== Career statistics ==
			Regular season					Playoffs
Season	Team	League	GP	G	A	Pts	PIM	GP	G	A	Pts	PIM
1978–79	Stratford Cullitons	MWJHL	42	20	31	51	16	—	—	—	—	—
1978–79	Ottawa 79's	Midget	10	2	11	13	—	—	—	—	—	—
1979–80	Peterborough Petes	OMJHL	68	8	20	28	47	14	2	8	10	6
1980–81	Peterborough Petes	OHL	68	9	48	57	144	5	1	3	4	4
1981–82	Peterborough Petes	OHL	14	1	9	10	25	—	—	—	—	—
1981–82	Niagara Falls Flyers	OHL	27	6	26	32	33	5	3	5	8	15
1981–82	Dallas Black Hawks	CHL	8	2	2	4	4	9	0	4	4	10
1981–82	Vancouver Canucks	NHL	22	0	1	1	10	3	0	0	0	0
1982–83	Fredericton Express	AHL	76	4	15	19	20	10	0	3	3	7
1983–84	Vancouver Canucks	NHL	51	2	10	12	48	3	0	0	0	0
1983–84	Fredericton Express	AHL	27	1	6	7	27	—	—	—	—	—
1984–85	Vancouver Canucks	NHL	11	0	0	0	16	—	—	—	—	—
1984–85	Fredericton Express	AHL	47	1	11	12	58	—	—	—	—	—
1985–86	Fredericton Express	AHL	73	3	9	12	60	6	0	1	1	10
NHL totals			84	2	11	13	74	6	0	0	0	0
AHL totals			223	9	41	50	165	16	0	4	4	17
