= Michel Bolduc =

Canadian ice hockey defenceman (born 1961)

- Born: March 13, 1961 (age 65) L'Ange-Gardien, Quebec, Canada
- Height: 6 ft 2 in (188 cm)
- Weight: 209 lb (95 kg; 14 st 13 lb)
- Position: Defense
- Shot: Left
- Played for: Quebec Nordiques
- NHL draft: 150th overall, 1980; Quebec Nordiques
- Playing career: 1981–1987

Michel Bolduc (born March 13, 1961) is a Canadian former professional ice hockey defenceman.

Bolduc was born in Ange-Gardien, Quebec. As a youth, he played in the 1974 Quebec International Pee-Wee Hockey Tournament with a minor ice hockey team from Beauport, Quebec City. He played 10 NHL games for the Quebec Nordiques. His son, Jean-Michel Bolduc, was drafted by the Minnesota Wild in the 2003 NHL Entry draft.

== Career statistics ==
			Regular season					Playoffs
Season	Team	League	GP	G	A	Pts	PIM	GP	G	A	Pts	PIM
1977–78	Hull Olympiques	QMJHL	60	1	5	6	36	4	0	0	0	0
1978–79	Hull Olympiques	QMJHL	6	0	1	1	5	—	—	—	—	—
1978–79	Chicoutimi Sagueneens	QMJHL	66	1	23	24	142	4	0	2	2	6
1979–80	Chicoutimi Sagueneens	QMJHL	65	3	29	32	219	12	1	3	4	46
1980–81	Chicoutimi Sagueneens	QMJHL	67	11	35	46	240	12	0	4	4	34
1981–82	Quebec Nordiques	NHL	3	0	0	0	0	—	—	—	—	—
1981–82	Fredericton Express	AHL	69	4	9	13	130	—	—	—	—	—
1982–83	Quebec Nordiques	NHL	7	0	0	0	6	—	—	—	—	—
1982–83	Fredericton Express	AHL	68	4	18	22	165	11	1	1	2	50
1983–84	Fredericton Express	AHL	70	2	15	17	96	7	0	1	1	19
1984–85	Fredericton Express	AHL	29	0	9	9	74	—	—	—	—	—
1984–85	Maine Mariners	AHL	31	1	7	8	86	11	1	1	2	23
1985–86	Maine Mariners	AHL	66	1	6	7	29	5	0	1	1	6
1986–87	Riviere-du-Loup 3L	RHL	29	2	19	21	105	—	—	—	—	—
NHL totals			10	0	0	0	6	—	—	—	—	—
AHL totals			333	12	64	76	580	34	2	4	6	98
