= 1980 NHL entry draft =

1980 North American ice hockey draft

General information
- Date: June 11, 1980
- Location: Montreal Forum; Montreal, Quebec, Canada

Overview
- 210 total selections in 10 rounds
- First selection: (Canada) Doug Wickenheiser (Montreal Canadiens)
- Hall of Famers: 4: C Denis Savard; D Larry Murphy; D Paul Coffey; RW Jari Kurri

The 1980 NHL entry draft was the 18th draft for the National Hockey League. It was held at the Montreal Forum in Montreal. This was the first time that an NHL arena hosted the draft. The NHL teams selected 210 players eligible for entry into professional ranks, in the reverse order of the 1979–80 NHL season and playoff standings. This is the list of those players selected. The minimum draft age was lowered from 19 to 18, but prospective draftees had to be of age by September 15 rather than any date in the relevant birth year.

The hometown Montreal Canadiens used the first selection on Doug Wickenheiser.

The last active players in the NHL from this draft class were Paul Coffey and Larry Murphy, who both retired after the 2000–01 season.

== Selections by round ==
Below are listed the selections in the 1980 NHL entry draft.

= NHL All-Star team ·	= NHL All-Star (Note: Players are identified as an All-Star if they were selected for the All-Star game at any time in their career.) ·	= NHL All-Star and NHL All-Star team ·	= Hall of Famers

Club teams are located in North America unless otherwise noted.

=== Round one ===
#	Player	Nationality	NHL team	College/junior/club team
1	Doug Wickenheiser (C)	Canada	Montreal Canadiens (from Colorado)	Regina Pats (WHL)
2	Dave Babych (D)	Canada	Winnipeg Jets	Portland Winter Hawks (WHL)
3	Denis Savard (C)	Canada	Chicago Black Hawks (from Quebec)	Montreal Juniors (QMJHL)
4	Larry Murphy (D)	Canada	Los Angeles Kings (from Detroit)	Peterborough Petes (OHA)
5	Darren Veitch (D)	Canada	Washington Capitals	Regina Pats (WHL)
6	Paul Coffey (D)	Canada	Edmonton Oilers	Kitchener Rangers (OHA)
7	Rick Lanz (D)	Canada	Vancouver Canucks	Oshawa Generals (OHA)
8	Fred Arthur (D)	Canada	Hartford Whalers	Cornwall Royals (QMJHL)
9	Mike Bullard (F)	Canada	Pittsburgh Penguins	Brantford Alexanders (OHA)
10	Jim Fox (F)	Canada	Los Angeles Kings	Ottawa 67s (OHA)
11	Mike Blaisdell (RW)	Canada	Detroit Red Wings (from Toronto)	Regina Pats (WHL)
12	Rik Wilson (D)	United States	St. Louis Blues	Kingston Canadians (OHA)
13	Denis Cyr (RW)	Canada	Calgary Flames	Montreal Juniors (QMJHL)
14	Jim Malone (F)	Canada	New York Rangers	Toronto Marlboros (OHA)
15	Jerry Dupont (D)	Canada	Chicago Black Hawks	Toronto Marlboros (OHA)
16	Brad Palmer (F)	Canada	Minnesota North Stars	Victoria Cougars (WHL)
17	Brent Sutter (C)	Canada	New York Islanders	Red Deer Rustlers (AJHL)
18	Barry Pederson (F)	Canada	Boston Bruins	Victoria Cougars (WHL)
19	Paul Gagne (F)	Canada	Colorado Rockies (from Montreal)	Windsor Spitfires (OHA)
20	Steve Patrick (F)	Canada	Buffalo Sabres	Brandon Wheat Kings (WHL)
21	Mike Stothers (D)	Canada	Philadelphia Flyers	Kingston Canadians (OHA)
^{Reference: "1980 NHL Entry Draft hockeydraftcentral.com". Archived from the original on January 22, 2009.}

Notes

1. The Colorado Rockies' first round pick went to the Montreal Canadiens as the result of a trade on September 13, 1976 that sent Ron Andruff, Sean Shanahan to Colorado in exchange for cash and Montreal's option to swap 1st-round picks in the 1980 Entry Draft. Montreal exercised the option and swap the 19th pick for the 1st overall pick in 1980.
2. The Quebec Nordiques' first round pick went to the Chicago Black Hawks as the result of a trade on June 9, 1979 that Black Hawks promised to not take Real Cloutier in 1979 NHL expansion draft in exchange for this pick.
3. The Detroit Red Wings' first round pick went to the Los Angeles Kings as the result of a trade on August 22, 1979, that sent rights to Dale McCourt to Detroit in exchange for Andre St. Laurent, Kings' option or Detroit's second round pick in 1980 or first round pick in 1981 and this pick.
4. The Toronto Maple Leafs' first round pick went to the Detroit Red Wings as the result of a trade on March 13, 1978 that sent Dan Maloney and the 25th overall pick to Toronto in exchange for Errol Thompson, a first and second round pick in 1978 and this pick.
5. The Montreal Canadiens' first round pick went to the Colorado Rockies as the result of a trade on September 13, 1976, that sent cash and Montreal's option to swap 1st-round picks in the 1980 Entry Draft to Montreal in exchange for Ron Andruff, Sean Shanahan. Montreal exercised the option and swap the 19th pick for the 1st overall pick in 1980.

=== Round two ===
#	Player	Nationality	NHL team	College/junior/club team
22	Joe Ward (C)	Canada	Colorado Rockies	Seattle Breakers (WHL)
23	Moe Mantha, Jr. (D)	Canada/ United States	Winnipeg Jets	Toronto Marlboros (OHA)
24	Normand Rochefort (D)	Canada	Quebec Nordiques	Quebec Remparts (QMJHL)
25	Craig Muni (D)	Canada	Toronto Maple Leafs (from Detroit)	Kingston Canadians (OHA)
26	Bob McGill (D)	Canada	Toronto Maple Leafs (from Washington)	Victoria Cougars (WHL)
27	Ric Nattress (D)	Canada	Montreal Canadiens (from Edmonton)	Brantford Alexanders (OHA)
28	Steve Ludzik (F)	Canada	Chicago Black Hawks (from Vancouver)	Niagara Falls Flyers (OHA)
29	Michel Galarneau (C)	Canada	Hartford Whalers	Hull Olympiques (QMJHL)
30	Ken Solheim (F)	Canada	Chicago Black Hawks (from Pittsburgh)	Medicine Hat Tigers (WHL)
31	Tony Curtale (D)	United States	Calgary Flames (from Los Angeles)	Brantford Alexanders (OHA)
32	Kevin LaVallee (F)	Canada	Calgary Flames (from Toronto)	Brantford Alexanders (OHA)
33	Greg Terrion (F)	Canada	Los Angeles Kings (from St. Louis)	Brantford Alexanders (OHA)
34	Dave Morrison (F)	Canada	Los Angeles Kings (from Calgary)	Peterborough Petes (OHA)
35	Mike Allison (F)	Canada	New York Rangers	Sudbury Wolves (OHA)
36	Len Dawes (D)	Canada	Chicago Black Hawks	Victoria Cougars (WHL)
37	Don Beaupre (G)	Canada	Minnesota North Stars	Sudbury Wolves (OHA)
38	Kelly Hrudey (G)	Canada	New York Islanders	Medicine Hat Tigers (WHL)
39	Steve Konroyd (D)	Canada	Calgary Flames (from Boston)	Oshawa Generals (OHA)
40	John Chabot (C)	Canada	Montreal Canadiens	Hull Olympiques (QMJHL)
41	Mike Moller (RW)	Canada	Buffalo Sabres	Lethbridge Broncos (WHL)
42	Jay Fraser (LW)	Canada	Philadelphia Flyers	Ottawa 67's (OHA)
^{Reference: "1980 NHL Entry Draft hockeydraftcentral.com".}

Notes

1. The Detroit Red Wings' second round pick went to the Toronto Maple Leafs as the result of a trade on March 13, 1978, that sent Errol Thompson, a first and second round pick in 1978 and the 11th overall pick to Detroit in exchange for Dan Maloney and this pick.
2. The Washington Capitals' second round pick went to the Toronto Maple Leafs as the result of a trade on June 11, 1980, that sent Mike Palmateer and the 55th overall pick in exchange for Tim Coulis, Robert Picard and this pick.
3. The Edmonton Oilers' second round pick went to the Montreal Canadiens as the result of a trade on June 13, 1979, that sent Dave Lumley and Dan Newman to Edmonton in exchange for this pick.
4. The Vancouver Canucks' second round pick went to the Chicago Black Hawks as the result of a trade on June 16, 1978, that sent the rights to Thomas Gradin to Vancouver in exchange for this pick. Chicago had the option of the 2nd-rd pick in 1979 or 1980 NHL Entry Draft.
5. The Pittsburgh Penguins' second round pick went to the Chicago Black Hawks as the result of a trade on October 9, 1978, that sent Dale Tallon to Chicago in exchange for this pick.
6. The Los Angeles Kings' second round pick went to the Calgary Flames as the result of a trade on June 16, 1979, that sent Richard Mulhern and the 34th overall pick to Los Angeles in exchange for Bob Murdoch and this pick.
7. The Toronto Maple Leafs' second round pick went to the Calgary Flames as the result of a trade on June 10, 1980, that sent David Shand and the 55th overall pick to Toronto in exchange for this pick.
8. The St. Louis Blues' second round pick went to the Los Angeles Kings as the result of a trade on January 14, 1978, that sent Neil Komadoski to St. Louis in exchange for this pick.
9. The Calgary Flames' second round pick went to the Los Angeles Kings as the result of a trade on June 16, 1979, that sent Bob Murdoch and the 31st overall pick to Toronto in exchange for Richard Mulhern and this pick.
10. The Boston Bruins' second round pick went to the Calgary Flames as the result of a trade on June 2, 1980, that sent Jim Craig to Boston in exchange for the third round pick in 1981 and this pick.

=== Round three ===
#	Player	Nationality	NHL team	College/junior/club team
43	Fred Boimistruck (D)	Canada	Toronto Maple Leafs (from Colorado)	Cornwall Royals (QMJHL)
44	Murray Eaves (C)	Canada	Winnipeg Jets	University of Michigan (NCAA)
45	John Newberry (C)	Canada	Montreal Canadiens (from Quebec)	Nanaimo Clippers (BCJHL)
46	Mark Osborne (LW)	Canada	Detroit Red Wings	Niagara Falls Flyers (OHA)
47	Dan Miele (RW)	Canada	Washington Capitals	Providence College (NCAA)
48	Shawn Babcock (LW)	Canada	Edmonton Oilers	Windsor Spitfires (OHA)
49	Andy Schliebener (D)	Canada	Vancouver Canucks	Peterborough Petes (OHA)
50	Mickey Volcan (D)	Canada	Hartford Whalers	University of North Dakota (NCAA)
51	Randy Boyd (D)	Canada	Pittsburgh Penguins	Ottawa 67's (OHA)
52	Steve Bozek (LW)	Canada	Los Angeles Kings	Northern Michigan University (NCAA)
53	Randy Velischek (D)	Canada	Minnesota North Stars (from Toronto)	Providence College (NCAA)
54	Jim Pavese (D)	United States	St. Louis Blues	Kitchener Rangers (OHA)
55	Torrie Robertson (LW)	Canada	Washington Capitals (from Calgary via Toronto)	Victoria Cougars (WHL)
56	Sean McKenna (RW)	Canada	Buffalo Sabres (from New York Rangers)	Sherbrooke Castors (QMJHL)
57	Troy Murray (C)	Canada	Chicago Black Hawks	St. Albert Saints (AJHL)
58	Marcel Frere (LW)	Canada	Chicago Black Hawks (from Minnesota)	Billings Bighorns (WHL)
59	Dave Simpson (C)	Canada	New York Islanders	London Knights (OHA)
60	Tom Fergus (C)	Canada	Boston Bruins	Peterborough Petes (OHA)
61	Craig Ludwig (D)	United States	Montreal Canadiens	University of North Dakota (NCAA)
62	Jay North (C)	United States	Buffalo Sabres	Bloomington Jefferson High School (USHS-MN)
63	Paul Mercier (D)	Canada	Philadelphia Flyers	Sudbury Wolves (OHA)
^{Reference: "1980 NHL Entry Draft hockeydraftcentral.com".}

==== Notes (Round 3) ====
1.* The Colorado Rockies' third round pick went to the Toronto Maple Leafs as the result of a trade on March 3, 1980, that sent Walt McKechnie to the Colorado Rockies in exchange for this pick.

2.* The Quebec Nordiques' third round pick went to the Montreal Canadiens as the result of a trade on June 9, 1979 that Quebec Nordiques promise to take Dan Geoffrion and/or Alain Cote, rather than Marc Tardif and/or Richard David in 1979 NHL Expansion Draft in exchange for the second round pick in 1981 and this pick.

3.* The Toronto Maple Leafs' third round pick went to the Minnesota North Stars as the result of a trade on October 5, 1978, that sent Walt McKechnie to the Toronto Maple Leafs in exchange for this pick.

4.* The Toronto Maple Leafs' third round pick went to the Washington Capitals as the result of a trade on June 11, 1980, that sent Tim Coulis, Robert Picard and a second-round pick in the 1980 Entry Draft (26th overall) to the Toronto in exchange for Mike Palmateer and this pick.
Toronto had acquired the pick previously as the result of a trade on June 10, 1980, that sent 32nd overall pick to the Calgary Flames in exchange for Dave Shand and this pick.

5.* The New York Rangers' third round pick went to the Buffalo Sabres as the result of a trade on March 12, 1979, that sent Jocelyn Guevremont to the New York Rangers in exchange for the third round pick in 1979 and this pick.

6.* The Minnesota North Stars' third round pick went to the Chicago Black Hawks as the result of a trade on May 4, 1978, that sent the rights to Eddie Mio and future considerations (Pierre Plante) to the Minnesota North Stars in exchange for Doug Hicks and this pick.

=== Round four ===
#	Player	Nationality	NHL team	College/junior/club team
64	Rick LaFerriere (G)	Canada	Colorado Rockies	Peterborough Petes (OMJHL)
65	Guy Fournier (C)	Canada	Winnipeg Jets	Shawinigan Cataractes (QMJHL)
66	Jay Miller (D)	United States	Quebec Nordiques	University of New Hampshire (ECAC)
67	Carey Wilson (C)	Canada	Chicago Black Hawks (from Detroit)	Dartmouth College (ECAC)
68	Monty Trottier (C)	Canada	New York Islanders (from Washington)	Billings Bighorns (WHL)
69	Jari Kurri (RW)	Finland	Edmonton Oilers	Jokerit (Finland)
70	Marc Crawford (LW)	Canada	Vancouver Canucks	Cornwall Royals (QMJHL)
71	Kevin McClelland (RW)	Canada	Hartford Whalers	Niagara Falls Flyers (OMJHL)
72	Tony Feltrin (D)	Canada	Pittsburgh Penguins	Victoria Cougars (WHL)
73	Bernie Nicholls (C)	Canada	Los Angeles Kings	Kingston Canadians (OMJHL)
74	Stew Gavin (LW)	Canada	Toronto Maple Leafs	Toronto Marlboros (OMJHL)
75	Bob Brooke (C)	United States	St. Louis Blues	Yale University (ECAC)
76	Marc Roy (RW)	Canada	Calgary Flames	Trois-Rivieres Draveurs (QMJHL)
77	Kurt Kleinendorst (C)	United States	New York Rangers	Providence College (ECAC)
78	Brian Shaw (RW)	Canada	Chicago Black Hawks	Portland Winter Hawks (WHL)
79	Mark Huglen (D)	United States	Minnesota North Stars	Roseau High School (USHS-MN)
80	Greg Gilbert (LW)	Canada	New York Islanders	Toronto Marlboros (OMJHL)
81	Steve Kasper (C)	Canada	Boston Bruins	Sorel Éperviers (QMJHL)
82	Jeff Teal (C)	United States	Montreal Canadiens	University of Minnesota (WCHA)
83	Jim Wiemer (LW)	Canada	Buffalo Sabres	Peterborough Petes (OMJHL)
84	Taras Zytynsky (D)	Canada	Philadelphia Flyers	Montreal Juniors (QMJHL)
^{Reference: "1980 NHL Entry Draft hockeydraftcentral.com".}

==== Notes (Round 4) ====
1.* The Detroit Red Wings' fourth round pick went to the Chicago Black Hawks as the result of a trade on December 2, 1977, that sent Dennis Hull to the Detroit Red Wings in exchange for this pick.

2.* The Washington Capitals' fourth round pick went to the New York Islanders as the result of a trade on December 7, 1979, that sent Mike Kaszycki to the Washington Capitals in exchange for Gord Lane and this pick.

=== Round five ===
#	Player	Nationality	NHL team	College/junior/club team
85	Ed Cooper (LW)	Canada	Colorado Rockies	Portland Winter Hawks (WHL)
86	Glen Ostir (D)	Canada	Winnipeg Jets	Portland Winter Hawks (WHL)
87	Basil McRae (LW)	Canada	Quebec Nordiques	London Knights (OMJHL)
88	Mike Corrigan (RW)	Canada	Detroit Red Wings	Cornwall Royals (QMJHL)
89	Timo Blomqvist (D)	Finland	Washington Capitals	Jokerit (Finland)
90	Walt Poddubny (C)	Canada	Edmonton Oilers	Kingston Canadians (OMJHL)
91	Darrell May (G)	Canada	Vancouver Canucks	Portland Winter Hawks (WHL)
92	Darren Jensen (G)	Canada	Hartford Whalers	University of North Dakota (WCHA)
93	Doug Shedden (C)	Canada	Pittsburgh Penguins	Sault Ste. Marie Greyhounds (OMJHL)
94	Alan Graves (LW)	Canada	Los Angeles Kings	Seattle Breakers (WHL)
95	Hugh Larkin (RW)	United States	Toronto Maple Leafs	Sault Ste. Marie Greyhounds (OMJHL)
96	Alain Lemieux (C)	Canada	St. Louis Blues	Chicoutimi Sagueneens (QMJHL)
97	Randy Turnbull (D)	Canada	Calgary Flames	Portland Winter Hawks (WHL)
98	Scot Kleinendorst (D)	United States	New York Rangers	Providence College (ECAC)
99	Kevin Ginnell (C)	Canada	Chicago Black Hawks	Medicine Hat Tigers (WHL)
100	David Jensen (D)	United States	Minnesota North Stars	University of Minnesota (WCHA)
101	Ken Leiter (D)	United States	New York Islanders	Michigan State University (WCHA)
102	Randy Hillier (D)	Canada	Boston Bruins	Sudbury Wolves (OMJHL)
103	Remi Gagne (RW)	Canada	Montreal Canadiens	Chicoutimi Sagueneens (QMJHL)
104	Dirk Reuter (D)	Canada	Buffalo Sabres	Sault Ste. Marie Greyhounds (OMJHL)
105	Dan Held (C)	Canada	Philadelphia Flyers	Seattle Breakers (WHL)
^{Reference: "1980 NHL Entry Draft hockeydraftcentral.com".}

=== Round six ===
#	Player	Nationality	NHL team	College/junior/club team
106	Aaron Broten (LW)	United States	Colorado Rockies	University of Minnesota (WCHA)
107	Ron Loustel (G)	Canada	Winnipeg Jets	Saskatoon Blades (WHL)
108	Mark Kumpel (RW)	United States	Quebec Nordiques	University of Massachusetts Lowell (ECAC)
109	Wayne Crawford (C)	Canada	Detroit Red Wings	Toronto Marlboros (OMJHL)
110	Todd Bidner (LW)	Canada	Washington Capitals	Toronto Marlboros (OMJHL)
111	Mike Winther (C)	Canada	Edmonton Oilers	Brandon Wheat Kings (WHL)
112	Ken Berry (LW)	Canada	Vancouver Canucks	Canadian National Development Team
113	Mario Cerri (C)	Canada	Hartford Whalers	Ottawa 67's (OMJHL)
114	Pat Graham (LW)	Canada	Pittsburgh Penguins	Niagara Falls Flyers (OMJHL)
115	Darren Eliot (G)	Canada	Los Angeles Kings	Cornell University (ECAC)
116	Ron Dennis (G)	Canada	Toronto Maple Leafs	Princeton University (ECAC)
117	Perry Anderson (LW)	Canada	St. Louis Blues	Kingston Canadians (OMJHL)
118	John Multan (RW)	Canada	Calgary Flames	Portland Winter Hawks (WHL)
119	Reijo Ruotsalainen (D)	Finland	New York Rangers	Oulu (Finland)
120	Steve Larmer (RW)	Canada	Chicago Black Hawks	Niagara Falls Flyers (OMJHL)
121	Danny Zavarise (D)	Canada	Minnesota North Stars	Cornwall Royals (QMJHL)
122	Dan Revell (LW)	Canada	New York Islanders	Oshawa Generals (OMJHL)
123	Steve Lyons (LW)	United States	Boston Bruins	Matignon High School (USHS-MA)
124	Mike McPhee (LW)	Canada	Montreal Canadiens	Rennssaeler Polytechnic Institute (ECAC)
125	Daniel Naud (D)	Canada	Buffalo Sabres	Sorel Eperviers (QMJHL)
126	Brian Tutt (D)	Canada	Philadelphia Flyers	Calgary Wranglers (WHL)
^{Reference: "1980 NHL Entry Draft hockeydraftcentral.com".}

=== Round seven ===
#	Player	Nationality	NHL team	College/junior/club team
127	Dan Fascinato (D)	Canada	Colorado Rockies	Ottawa 67's (OMJHL)
128	Brian Mullen (C)	United States	Winnipeg Jets	New York Jr. Rangers (NYMJHA)
129	Gaston Therrien (D)	Canada	Quebec Nordiques	Quebec Remparts (QMJHL)
130	Mike Braun (D)	Canada	Detroit Red Wings	Niagara Falls Flyers (OMJHL)
131	Frank Perkins (RW)	United States	Washington Capitals	Sudbury Wolves (OMJHL)
132	Andy Moog (G)	Canada	Edmonton Oilers	Billings Bighorns (WHL)
133	Doug Lidster (D)	Canada	Vancouver Canucks	Colorado College (WCHA)
134	Mike Martin (D)	Canada	Hartford Whalers	Sudbury Wolves (OMJHL)
135	Michael Lauen (RW)	United States	Winnipeg Jets (from Pittsburgh)	Michigan Technological University (WCHA)
136	Mike O'Connor (D)	Canada	Los Angeles Kings	Michigan Technological University (WCHA)
137	Russ Adam (C)	Canada	Toronto Maple Leafs	Kitchener Rangers (OMJHL)
138	Roger Hagglund (D)	Sweden	St. Louis Blues	Umea (Sweden)
139	Dave Newsom (LW)	Canada	Calgary Flames	Brantford Alexanders (OMJHL)
140	Bob Scurfield (C)	Canada	New York Rangers	Western Michigan University (CCHA)
141	Sean Simpson (C)	Canada	Chicago Black Hawks	Ottawa 67's (OMJHL)
142	Bill Stewart (RW)	Canada	Minnesota North Stars	University of Denver (WCHA)
143	Mark Hamway (RW)	United States	New York Islanders	Michigan State University (WCHA)
144	Tony McMurchy (C)	Canada	Boston Bruins	New Westminster Bruins (WHL)
145	Bill Norton (LW)	United States	Montreal Canadiens	Clarkson University (ECAC)
146	Jari Paavola (G)	Finland	Buffalo Sabres	TPS (Finland)
147	Ross Fitzpatrick (C)	Canada	Philadelphia Flyers	Western Michigan University (CCHA)
^{Reference: "1980 NHL Entry Draft hockeydraftcentral.com".}

==== Notes (Round 7) ====
1.* The Pittsburgh Penguins' seventh round pick went to the Winnipeg Jets as the result of a trade on June 9, 1979, that Winnipeg Jets promised not to claim Kim Clackson as a priority selection in the 1979 NHL expansion draft in exchange for this pick.

=== Round eight ===
#	Player	Nationality	NHL team	College/junior/club team
148	Andre Hidi (LW)	Canada	Colorado Rockies	Peterborough Petes (OMJHL)
149	Sandy Beadle (LW)	Canada	Winnipeg Jets	Northeastern University (ECAC)
150	Michel Bolduc (D)	Canada	Quebec Nordiques	Chicoutimi Sagueneens (QMJHL)
151	John Beukeboom (D)	Canada	Detroit Red Wings	Peterborough Petes (OMJHL)
152	Bruce Raboin (D)	United States	Washington Capitals	Providence Colleges (ECAC)
153	Rob Polman-Tuin (G)	Canada	Edmonton Oilers	Michigan Technological University (WCHA)
154	John O'Connor (D)	United States	Vancouver Canucks	University of Vermont (ECAC)
155	Brent DeNat (LW)	Canada	Hartford Whalers	Michigan Technological University (WCHA)
156	Bob Geale (C)	Canada	Pittsburgh Penguins	Portland Winter Hawks (WHL)
157	Billy O'Dwyer (C)	United States	Los Angeles Kings	Boston College (ECAC)
158	Fred Perlini (C)	Canada	Toronto Maple Leafs	Toronto Marlboros (OMJHL)
159	Pat Rabbitt (LW)	Canada	St. Louis Blues	Billings Bighorns (WHL)
160	Claude Drouin (C)	Canada	Calgary Flames	Quebec Remparts (QMJHL)
161	Bart Wilson (D)	Canada	New York Rangers	Toronto Marlboros (OMJHL)
162	Jim Ralph (G)	Canada	Chicago Black Hawks	Ottawa 67's (OMJHL)
163	Jeff Walters (RW)	Canada	Minnesota North Stars	Peterborough Petes (OMJHL)
164	Morey Gare (RW)	Canada	New York Islanders	Penticton Knights (BCJHL)
165	Mike Moffat (G)	Canada	Boston Bruins	Kingston Canadians (OMJHL)
166	Steve Penney (G)	Canada	Montreal Canadiens	Shawinigan Cataractes (QMJHL)
167	Randy Cunneyworth (C)	Canada	Buffalo Sabres	Ottawa 67's (OMJHL)
168	Mark Botell (D)	Canada	Philadelphia Flyers	Brantford Alexanders (OMJHL)
^{Reference: "1980 NHL Entry Draft hockeydraftcentral.com".}

=== Round nine ===
#	Player	Nationality	NHL team	College/junior/club team
169	Shawn MacKenzie (G)	Canada	Colorado Rockies	Windsor Spitfires (OMJHL)
170	Eddie Christian (C)	United States	Winnipeg Jets	Warroad High School (USHS-MN)
171	Christian Tanguay (RW)	Canada	Quebec Nordiques	Trois-Rivieres Draveurs (QMJHL)
172	Dave Miles (RW)	Canada	Detroit Red Wings	Brantford Alexanders (OMJHL)
173	Peter Andersson (D)	Sweden	Washington Capitals	Timra (Sweden)
174	Lars-Gunnar Pettersson (C)	Sweden	Edmonton Oilers	Lulea (Sweden)
175	Patrik Sundstrom (C)	Sweden	Vancouver Canucks	Umea (Sweden)
176	Paul Fricker (G)	Canada	Hartford Whalers	University of Michigan (WCHA)
177	Brian Lundberg (D)	Canada	Pittsburgh Penguins	University of Michigan (WCHA)
178	Daryl Evans (LW)	Canada	Los Angeles Kings	Niagara Falls Flyers (OMJHL)
179	Darwin McCutcheon (D)	Canada	Toronto Maple Leafs	Toronto Marlboros (OMJHL)
180	Peter Lindgren (D)	Sweden	St. Louis Blues	Hammarby (Sweden)
181	Hakan Loob (RW)	Sweden	Calgary Flames	Karlstad (Sweden)
182	Chris Wray (RW)	United States	New York Rangers	Boston College (ECAC)
183	Don Dietrich (D)	Canada	Chicago Black Hawks	Brandon Wheat Kings (WHL)
184	Bob Lakso (LW)	United States	Minnesota North Stars	Aurora-Hoyt Lakes High School (USHS-MN)
185	Peter Steblyk (D)	Canada	New York Islanders	Medicine Hat Tigers (WHL)
186	Michael Thelven (D)	Sweden	Boston Bruins	Djurgardens IF (Sweden)
187	John Schmidt (D)	United States	Montreal Canadiens	University of Notre Dame (WCHA)
188	Dave Beckon (C)	Canada	Buffalo Sabres	Peterborough Petes (OMJHL)
189	Peter Dineen (D)	Canada	Philadelphia Flyers	Kingston Canadians (OMJHL)
^{Reference: "1980 NHL Entry Draft hockeydraftcentral.com".}

=== Round ten ===
#	Player	Nationality	NHL team	College/junior/club team
190	Bob Jansch (RW)	Canada	Colorado Rockies	Victoria Cougars (WHL)
191	Dave Chartier (C)	Canada	Winnipeg Jets	Brandon Wheat Kings (WHL)
192	Bill Robinson (D)	United States	Quebec Nordiques	Acton-Boxborough High School (USHS-MA)
193	Brian Rorabeck (RW)	Canada	Detroit Red Wings	Niagara Falls Flyers (OMJHL)
194	Tony Camazzola (D)	Canada	Washington Capitals	Brandon Wheat Kings (WHL)
195	Bob O'Brien (RW)	Canada	Philadelphia Flyers (from Edmonton)	Dixie Beehives (OPJHL)
196	Grant Martin (C)	Canada	Vancouver Canucks	Kitchener Rangers (OMJHL)
197	Lorne Bokshowan (C)	Canada	Hartford Whalers	Saskatoon Blades (WHL)
198	Steve McKenzie (D)	Canada	Pittsburgh Penguins	St. Albert Saints (AJHL)
199	Kim Collins (LW)	Canada	Los Angeles Kings	Bowling Green University (CCHA)
200	Paul Higgins (RW)	Canada	Toronto Maple Leafs	Henry Carr Crusaders (MetJHL)
201	John Smyth (D)	Canada	St. Louis Blues	Calgary Wranglers (WHL)
202	Steven Fletcher (D)	Canada	Calgary Flames	Hull Olympiques (QMJHL)
203	Anders Backstrom (D)	Sweden	New York Rangers	Brynas IF (Sweden)
204	Dan Frawley (RW)	Canada	Chicago Black Hawks	Sudbury Wolves (OMJHL)
205	Dave Richter (D)	Canada	Minnesota North Stars	University of Michigan (WCHA)
206	Glenn Johannesen (D)	Canada	New York Islanders	Red Deer Rustlers (AJHL)
207	Jens Ohling (LW)	Sweden	Boston Bruins	Djurgardens IF (Sweden)
208	Scott Robinson (G)	Canada	Montreal Canadiens	University of Denver (WCHA)
209	John Bader (LW)	United States	Buffalo Sabres	Irondale High School (USHS-MN)
210	Andy Brickley (LW)	United States	Philadelphia Flyers	University of New Hampshire (ECAC)
^{Reference: "1980 NHL Entry Draft hockeydraftcentral.com".}

==== Notes (Round 10) ====
1.* The Edmonton Oilers' tenth round pick went to the Philadelphia Flyers as the result of a trade on June 11, 1980, that sent Barry Dean to the Edmonton Oilers in exchange for Ron Areshenkoff and this pick.

== Draftees based on nationality ==
Rank	Country	Amount
	North America	197
1	Canada	164
2	United States	33
	Europe	13
3	Sweden	9
4	Finland	4

== See also ==
- 1980–81 NHL season
- List of NHL players
