= Taras Zytynsky =

- Born: May 10, 1962 (age 64) Montreal, Quebec, Canada
- Height: 6 ft 1 in (185 cm)
- Weight: 205 lb (93 kg; 14 st 9 lb)
- Position: Defence
- Shot: Left
- Played for: Maine Mariners; Springfield Indians; Peoria Rivermen; Rochester Americans; EHC Biel; Diables Rouges de Briançon; Brest Albatros Hockey; Dragons de Rouen; Jets de Viry-Essonne
- National team: France
- NHL draft: 84th overall, 1980; Philadelphia Flyers
- Playing career: 1982–2001

Taras John Zytynsky (born May 10, 1962) is a Canadian former professional ice hockey player who played in the American Hockey League (AHL) and French Ligue Magnus. He was drafted by the Philadelphia Flyers in the fourth round of the 1980 NHL entry draft.

== Career statistics ==
=== Regular season and playoffs ===
			Regular season					Playoffs
Season	Team	League	GP	G	A	Pts	PIM	GP	G	A	Pts	PIM
1978–79	Montreal Juniors	QMJHL	59	4	12	16	25	11	0	4	4	17
1979–80	Montreal Juniors	QMJHL	72	12	29	41	104	10	0	5	5	12
1980–81	Montreal Juniors	QMJHL	45	7	13	20	56	7	0	5	5	6
1981–82	Montreal Juniors	QMJHL	64	18	39	57	82	14	1	3	4	31
1982–83	Maine Mariners	AHL	80	12	24	36	45	13	0	2	2	4
1983–84	Springfield Indians	AHL	70	1	7	18	55	4	0	1	1	8
1984–85	Peoria Rivermen	IHL	66	5	11	16	71	14	1	2	3	15
1985–86	Rochester Americans	AHL	65	2	15	17	78	—	—	—	—	—
1986–87	EHC Biel	NLA	13	4	7	11	21	—	—	—	—	—
1988–89	Chamonix HC	France2	23	9	19	28	32	—	—	—	—	—
1989–90	Chamonix HC	France2	14	5	11	16	12	—	—	—	—	—
1990–91	Diables Rouges de Briançon	France	28	3	5	8	24	7	1	5	6	2
1991–92	Diables Rouges de Briançon	France	31	3	10	13	36	—	—	—	—	—
1993–94	Brest Albatros Hockey	France	11	1	1	2	2	6	0	1	1	10
1994–95	Dragons de Rouen	France	25	4	4	8	18	5	4	2	6	4
1995–96	Jets de Viry-Essonne	France	16	1	5	6	14	4	0	4	4	0
1996–97	Heilbronner EC	1st Liga	61	5	24	29	99	—	—	—	—	—
1998–99	HC Lions Courmaosta	Serie A	11	0	1	1	4	—	—	—	—	—
AHL totals			215	15	56	71	178	17	0	3	3	12

=== International ===
Year	Team	Event	GP	G	A	Pts	PIM
1995	France	WC	6	0	0	0	6
1996	France	WC	7	0	2	2	4
Senior int'l totals			13	0	2	2	10

== Awards and honours ==
Award	Year	Ref
QMJHL Second All-Star Team	1981–82	
