= Anders Bäckström =

Swedish ice hockey player

- Born: December 9, 1960 (age 65) Njurunda, Sweden
- Height: 6 ft 3 in (191 cm)
- Weight: 185 lb (84 kg; 13 st 3 lb)
- Position: Defence
- Shot: Left
- Played for: Brynäs IF (SEL)
- NHL draft: 203rd overall, 1980; New York Rangers
- Playing career: 1978–1988

Anders Bäckström (born December 12, 1960) is a former Swedish professional ice hockey defenceman who played for Brynäs IF of the Swedish Elitserien. He was drafted by the New York Rangers in the 1980 NHL entry draft, but never made it to the NHL, playing 311 games in the SEL, scoring 28 goals and 66 assists for 94 total points.

He also served as the team manager for Brynäs IF from 1999 to 2002 and was an assistant coach for the team in the 2004–05 season.

His son, Nicklas, plays for the Washington Capitals of the NHL.

Anders Bäckström
Medal record

Representing Sweden

Ice hockey

World Junior Championships
Bronze medal – third place	1980 Helsinki	

== Career statistics ==
			Regular season					Playoffs
Season	Team	League	GP	G	A	Pts	PIM	GP	G	A	Pts	PIM
1976–77	Ånge IK	Division 2	20	5	4	9	—	—	—	—	—	—
1977–78	Ånge IK	Division 2	21	3	2	5	—	—	—	—	—	—
1978–79	Brynäs IF J20	Juniorserien	—	—	—	—	—	—	—	—	—	—
1978–79	Brynäs IF	Elitserien	3	0	0	0	0	—	—	—	—	—
1979–80	Brynäs IF J20	Juniorserien	—	—	—	—	—	—	—	—	—	—
1979–80	Brynäs IF	Elitserien	36	3	5	8	26	7	0	1	1	4
1980–81	Brynäs IF	Elitserien	30	4	6	10	18	—	—	—	—	—
1981–82	Brynäs IF	Elitserien	36	3	4	7	34	—	—	—	—	—
1982–83	Brynäs IF	Elitserien	36	2	9	11	22	—	—	—	—	—
1983–84	Brynäs IF	Elitserien	35	2	9	11	22	—	—	—	—	—
1984–85	Brynäs IF	Elitserien	36	5	7	12	22	—	—	—	—	—
1985–86	Brynäs IF	Elitserien	36	4	12	16	30	3	0	1	1	4
1986–87	Brynäs IF	Elitserien	35	4	12	16	16	—	—	—	—	—
1987–88	Brynäs IF	Elitserien	28	1	2	3	18	—	—	—	—	—
1991–92	Östervåla IF	Division 2	33	3	22	25	22	—	—	—	—	—
1992–93	Östervåla IF	Division 1	10	2	1	3	6	—	—	—	—	—
Elitserien totals			311	28	66	94	208	10	0	2	2	8
