= Alexander Opekushin =

Russian sculptor

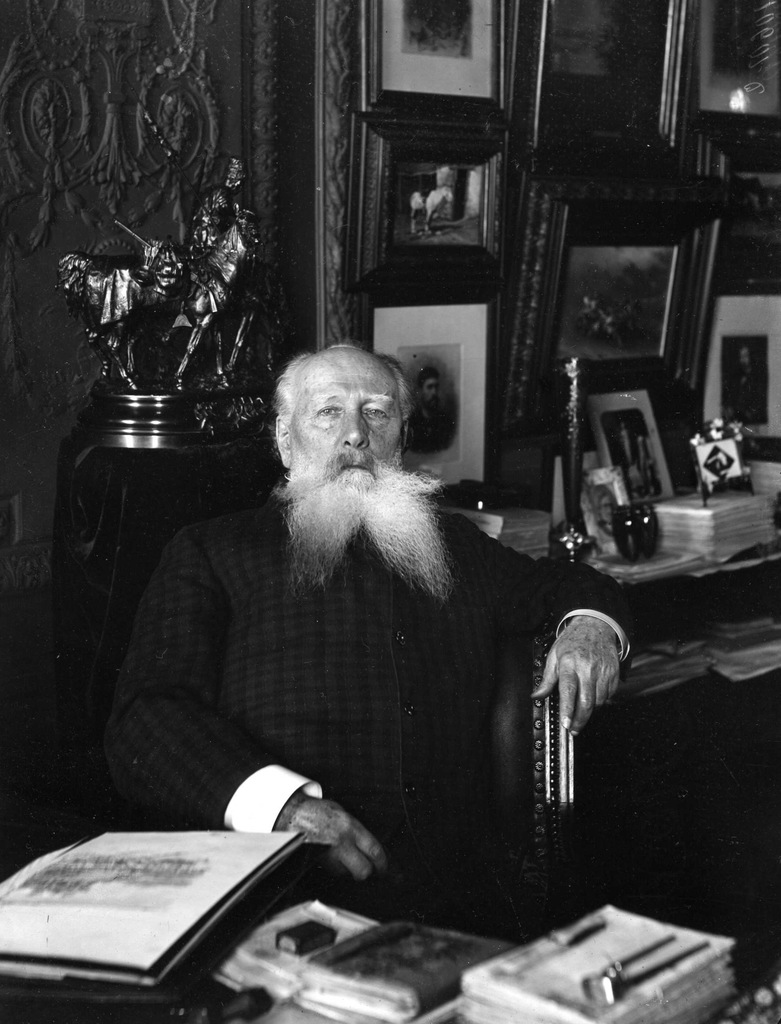
Alexander Opekushin in his studio, by Karl Bulla (1908)

Alexander Mikhailovich Opekushin (Russian: Александр Михайлович Опекушин; 16 November 1838, Svechkino, Danilovsky Uyezd - 4 March 1923, Rybnitsa, Danilovsky Uyezd) was a Russian sculptor, known primarily for his monumental works.

== Biography ==
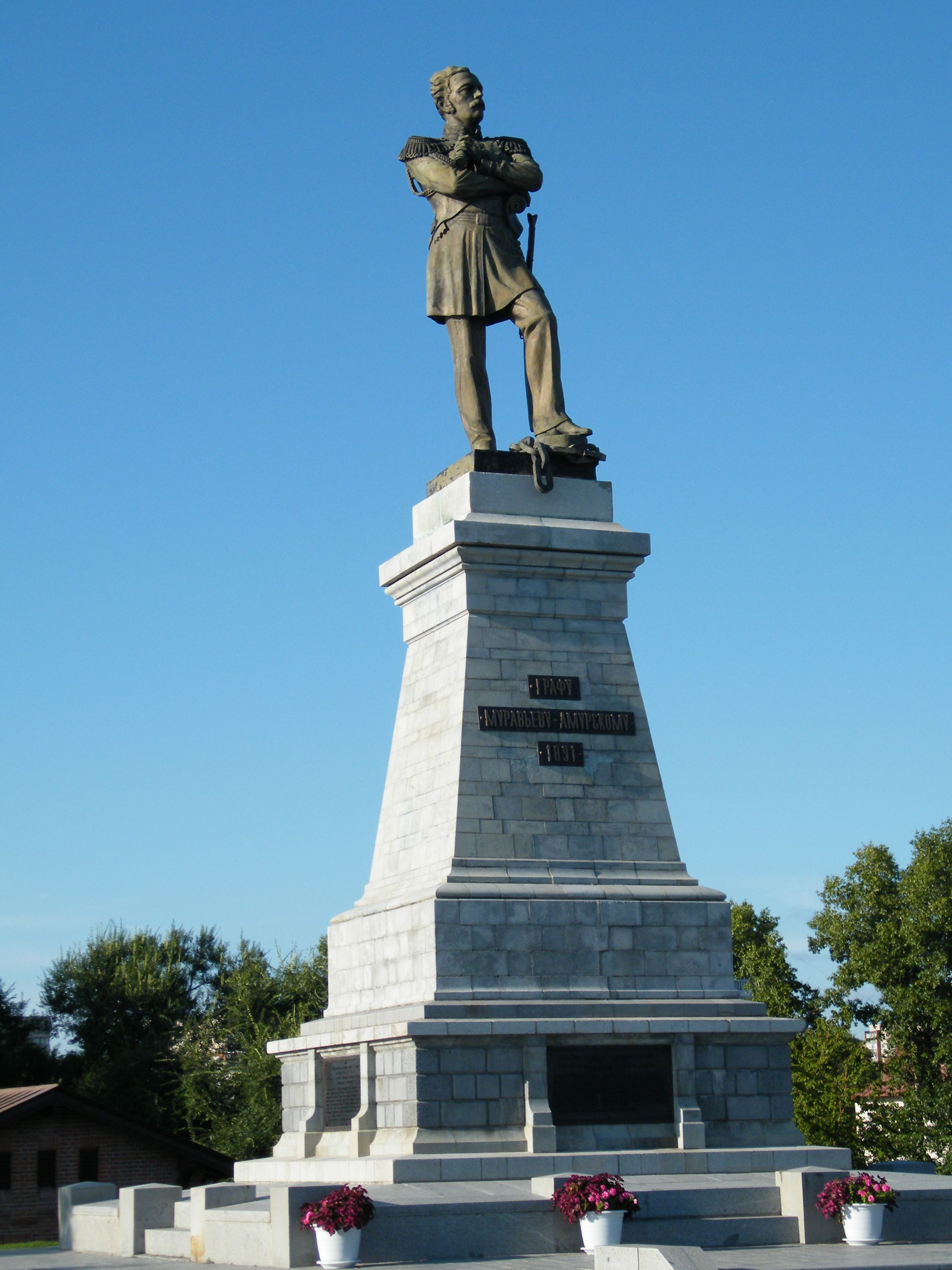
The monument to Muravyov-Amursky; restored in 1992

He was born on the estates of E. V. Olkhin, a major landowner. His father, a serf who made regular visits to Saint Petersburg, obtained permission from Olkhin for Alexander to attend drawing classes at the Imperial Society for the Encouragement of the Arts. He was able to graduate in two years, instead of the usual three, and was taken into the studios of the sculptor, David Jensen. In order to complete his studies at the Imperial Academy of Arts, he had to purchase his freedom for 500 Rubles. He was legally freed in 1859. Two years later, he married Evdokia Ivanovna Guskina, the daughter of a state serf.

At the Academy, he continued his studies with Jensen. In 1862, he received his first award: a small silver medal for a bas-relief on a Biblical theme. His talent was noticed by the artist, Mikhail Mikeshin, who invited him to participate in completing his monument, the "Millennium of Russia". The Academy awarded him the title of "Artist First-Class" in 1870, and he was promoted to "Academician" in 1872.

In 1888, he entered a competition to design a monument honoring the former Governor-General of Siberia, Nikolay Muravyov-Amursky, and his entry was selected. When it was cast in bronze and erected in Khabarovsk in 1891, it was the tallest monument in Russia (16 meters/52.5 feet, including the pedestal). The statue was removed by the revolutionary government in 1925 and replaced by one of Lenin. Another monument, to the industrialist, Ivan Kharitonenko, in Sumy (1895), was destroyed during the same period. Between 1873 and 1913, he created several monuments to Alexander Pushkin, which still survive, as do ones to Tsar Alexander II in Częstochowa and Rybinsk.

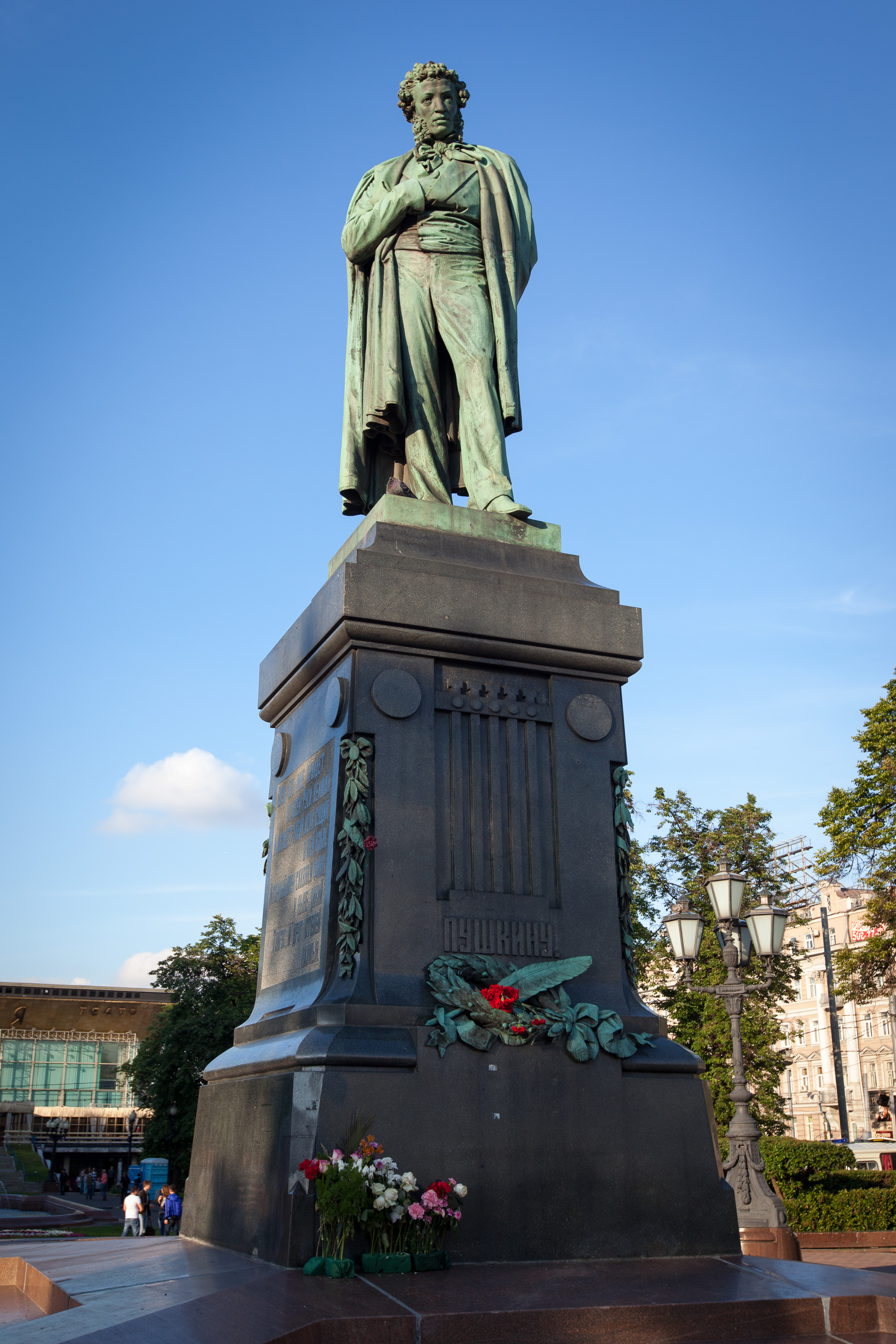
Monument to Pushkin in Moscow

Despite his large public works, and commissions from the Romanovs (he was a staunch monarchist), it was difficult for him to support his large family, so he also did decorative work. In addition to the interiors of mansions, his sculptures also adorn the façades of the Shelaputin Theatre, the Moscow Exchange, and the Central Bank Building.

In 1919, sick and impoverished, he and his youngest daughters were sent to live with a cousin in Yaroslavl Oblast, at state expense. Once there, a local priest in Rybnitsa provided him with a free house. The promised government pension was not paid until 1922, so his neighbors provided the necessary support. In early 1923, he caught a cold, which turned into pneumonia, and he died. He was buried in a local cemetery, not far from where he was baptized. It was only in 1972 that a modest tombstone was erected. In 1986, the newly discovered Asteroid 5055 was named after him.
