= Léopold Bernhard Bernstamm =

Russian sculptor (1859–1939)

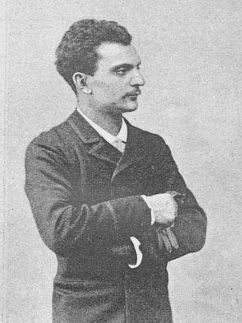
Bernstamm c. 1889

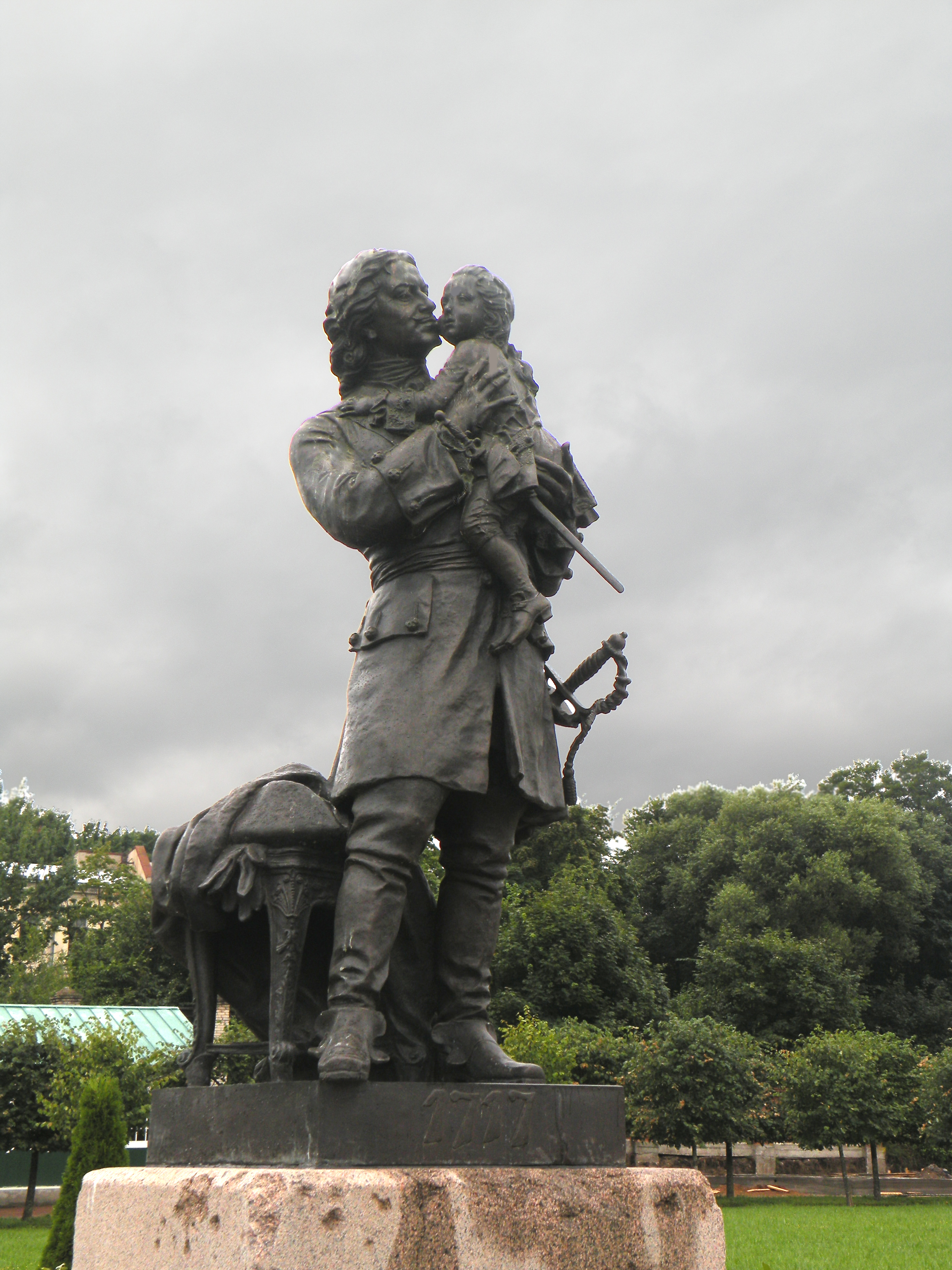
Peter I with Louis XV, Peterhof Palace

Léopold Bernhard Bernstamm (20 April 1859 – 22 January 1939), also known as Léopold-Bernhard Bernstam, Léopold Bernard Bernstamm or Leopold Adolfovich Bernstam, (Note: Russian: Леопольд Адольфович Бернштам.) was a Russian and French sculptor of Baltic German descent. He was one of the official sculptors of the Musée Grévin.

== Biography ==
Bernstamm was born in Riga (present-day Latvia), where he entered the studio of David Jensen at age 13, and at 14 entered the Imperial Academy of Fine Arts of Saint Petersburg, where he won several awards.

In the early 1880s, he made about 30 busts of celebrated Russians including Fyodor Dostoyevsky (from a death mask, 1881), Denis Fonvizin, Aleksandr Ostrovsky (for the foyer of the Alexandrinsky Theater), and Mikhail Saltykov-Shchedrin (erected at the writer's grave in 1900). These busts established his reputation. He then spent 1884 in Rome and Florence, continuing his studies under a Professor Rivalti.

In 1885, he settled in Paris, often returning to Saint Petersburg. His sculptures of eminent Frenchmen soon made him famous, including portraits of François Coppée, Paul Déroulède, Gustave Flaubert, Ludovic Halévy, Ernest Renan, Victorien Sardou, Émile Zola, and Jean-Léon Gérôme. He also made portraits of Emperor Nicholas II of Russia and members of the Imperial family (1896), Anton Rubinstein (1901), and Alexander Pushkin (1911).

His last work for Saint Petersburg was the bust of Emperor Alexander III of Russia (erected in the Russian Museum garden, removed in 1918). All told, he sculpted approximately 300 portraits of Russian and European representatives of culture, science and politics, and sculpted some monuments. Bernstamm was made chevalier of the Légion d'honneur in 1891.

== Sources ==
- "Бернштам, Леопольд Адольфович" . Brockhaus and Efron Encyclopedic Dictionary (in Russian). 1906.
