= David Jensen (ice hockey, born 1961) =

American ice hockey player

- Born: May 3, 1961 (age 65) Minneapolis, Minnesota, U.S.A.
- Height: 6 ft 1 in (185 cm)
- Weight: 185 lb (84 kg; 13 st 3 lb)
- Position: Defense
- Shot: Left
- Played for: Minnesota North Stars; SV Ritten
- National team: United States
- NHL draft: 100th overall, 1980; Minnesota North Stars
- Playing career: 1983–1990

David Henry Jensen (born May 3, 1961) is an American former ice hockey player who played in 18 National Hockey League games with the Minnesota North Stars between 1984 and 1986. He is the younger brother of Paul Jensen.

== Playing career ==
Jensen played for the University of Minnesota from 1979 to 1983. He also played for the American national junior team at the 1980 1981 World Junior Championships. He was selected 100th overall in the 1980 NHL entry draft by the Minnesota North Stars, Jensen played with the American national team in 1983–84 as an amateur and played in the 1984 Winter Olympics in Sarajevo. He also played at the 1986 World Championships.

He made his NHL debut with Minnesota in 1984, and played 18 games over parts of three seasons. Most of his professional career, which lasted from 1983 to 1990, was spent in the minor leagues. He finished with three seasons in Italy playing for SV Ritten.

== Post-playing career ==
Jensen retired from hockey in 1990 after playing several years in Europe. Currently, he is the Senior Vice President of Touchpoint Media, a custom communications company in Minneapolis that publishes USA Hockey Magazine and Cambria Style among other titles.

== Career statistics ==
=== Regular season and playoffs ===
			Regular season					Playoffs
Season	Team	League	GP	G	A	Pts	PIM	GP	G	A	Pts	PIM
1978–79	Robbinsdale Armstrong High School	HSMN	—	—	—	—	—	—	—	—	—	—
1979–80	University of Minnesota	WCHA	33	0	5	5	32	—	—	—	—	—
1980–81	University of Minnesota	WCHA	35	0	13	13	64	—	—	—	—	—
1981–82	University of Minnesota	WCHA	32	3	13	16	68	—	—	—	—	—
1982–83	University of Minnesota	WCHA	38	5	24	29	48	—	—	—	—	—
1982–83	Birmingham South Stars	CHL	—	—	—	—	—	2	0	0	0	0
1983–84	United States National Team	Intl	47	3	15	18	38	—	—	—	—	—
1983–84	Minnesota North Stars	NHL	8	0	1	1	0	—	—	—	—	—
1983–84	Salt Lake Golden Eagles	CHL	13	0	7	7	6	5	0	1	1	5
1984–85	Minnesota North Stars	NHL	5	0	1	1	4	—	—	—	—	—
1984–85	Springfield Indians	AHL	69	13	27	40	63	4	0	1	1	0
1985–86	Minnesota North Stars	NHL	5	0	0	0	7	—	—	—	—	—
1985–86	Springfield Indians	AHL	40	4	18	22	31	—	—	—	—	—
1986–87	SV Ritten	ITA	40	21	38	59	53	—	—	—	—	—
1988–89	SV Ritten	ITA-2	29	20	35	55	22	—	—	—	—	—
1989–90	SV Ritten	ITA-2	22	24	29	53	10	10	12	10	22	12
AHL totals			109	17	45	62	94	4	0	1	1	0
NHL totals			18	0	2	2	11	—	—	—	—	—

=== International ===
Year	Team	Event	GP	G	A	Pts	PIM
1980	United States	WJC	5	0	3	3	4
1981	United States	WJC	5	0	0	0	4
1984	United States	OLY	6	0	0	0	6
1986	United States	WC	10	1	0	1	12
Junior totals			10	0	3	3	8
Senior totals			16	1	0	1	18
