= David Jensen (sculptor) =

Russian sculptor (1816–1902)

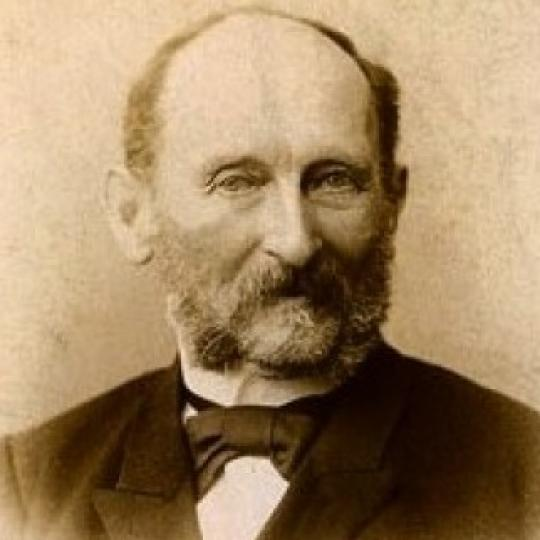
David Jensen (date unknown)

David Ivanovich Jensen or Yensen (Russian: Давид Иванович Йенсен; 19 November 1816, Copenhagen – 23 January 1902, Saint Petersburg) was a Russian decorative sculptor and art professor.

== Biography ==
His father, Jens Holmgren, was a carpenter. He studied at the Royal Danish Academy of Fine Arts, under the direction of Bertel Thorvaldsen. In 1841, the Academy awarded him a large gold medal for his bas-relief of Christ in the house of Martha and Mary.

That same year, he was one of many who received a commission to do sculptural work at the new palace of Grand Duchess Maria Nikolaevna of Russia (now known as the Marinsky Palace). His contribution consisted mainly of bas-reliefs and caryatids. In 1845, for his bas-relief of Chiron teaching Achilles to use a bow, he was granted the title of "Free Artist" by the Imperial Academy of Arts.

From 1843 to 1847, he also taught drawing at the Imperial Society for the Encouragement of the Arts. His students included Alexander Opekushin and Léopold Bernhard Bernstamm. In 1847, together with Ivan Reimers, he created the Establishment for the Exterior Decorations of Buildings (Russian: Заведение для наружных украшений зданий), the first such workshop in Russia to produce sculptural decorations from terracotta.

In 1857, he was granted Russian citizenship and named an academician for his bas-relief of Achilles with the body of Hector. The Academy awarded him the title of Professor in 1868, for his statue of Diana. He died in 1902 and was interred at the Smolensky Lutheran Cemetery.

Most of his work was done for the Romanovs. In addition to Marinsky Palace, his works adorn the New Hermitage, the Beloselsky-Belozersky Palace, the Saint Petersburg Manege, and the Imperial Rooms of the Tsarskoye Selo Railway, among many others. The Bolshoi Drama Theater, the Grand Choral Synagogue and the Grand Hotel Europe are his most notable non-Royal commissions. His few monuments include one for the Scottish-born surgeon, Sir James Wylie.

== Gallery ==
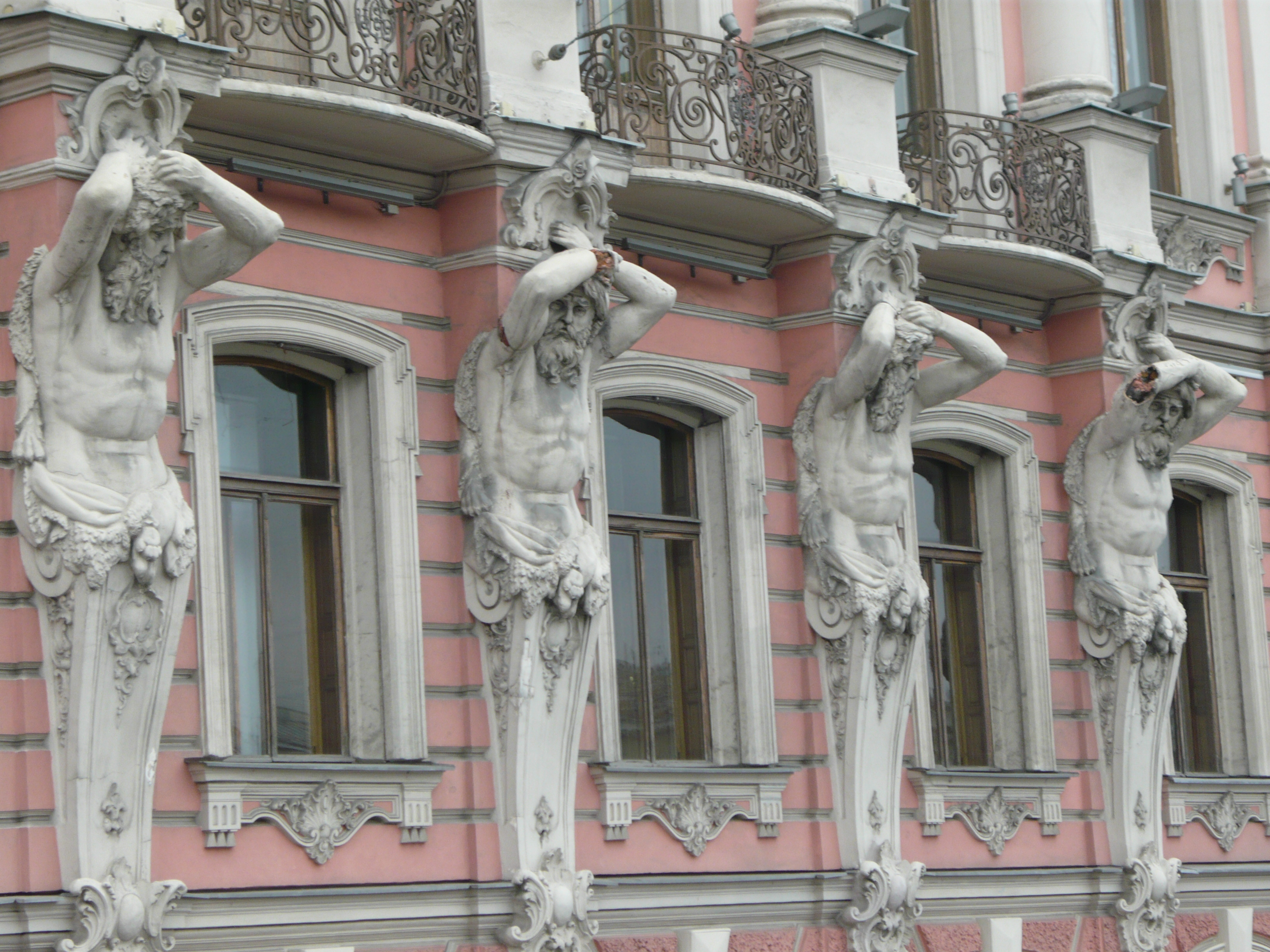
Atlantans at the Beloselsky-Belozersky Palace

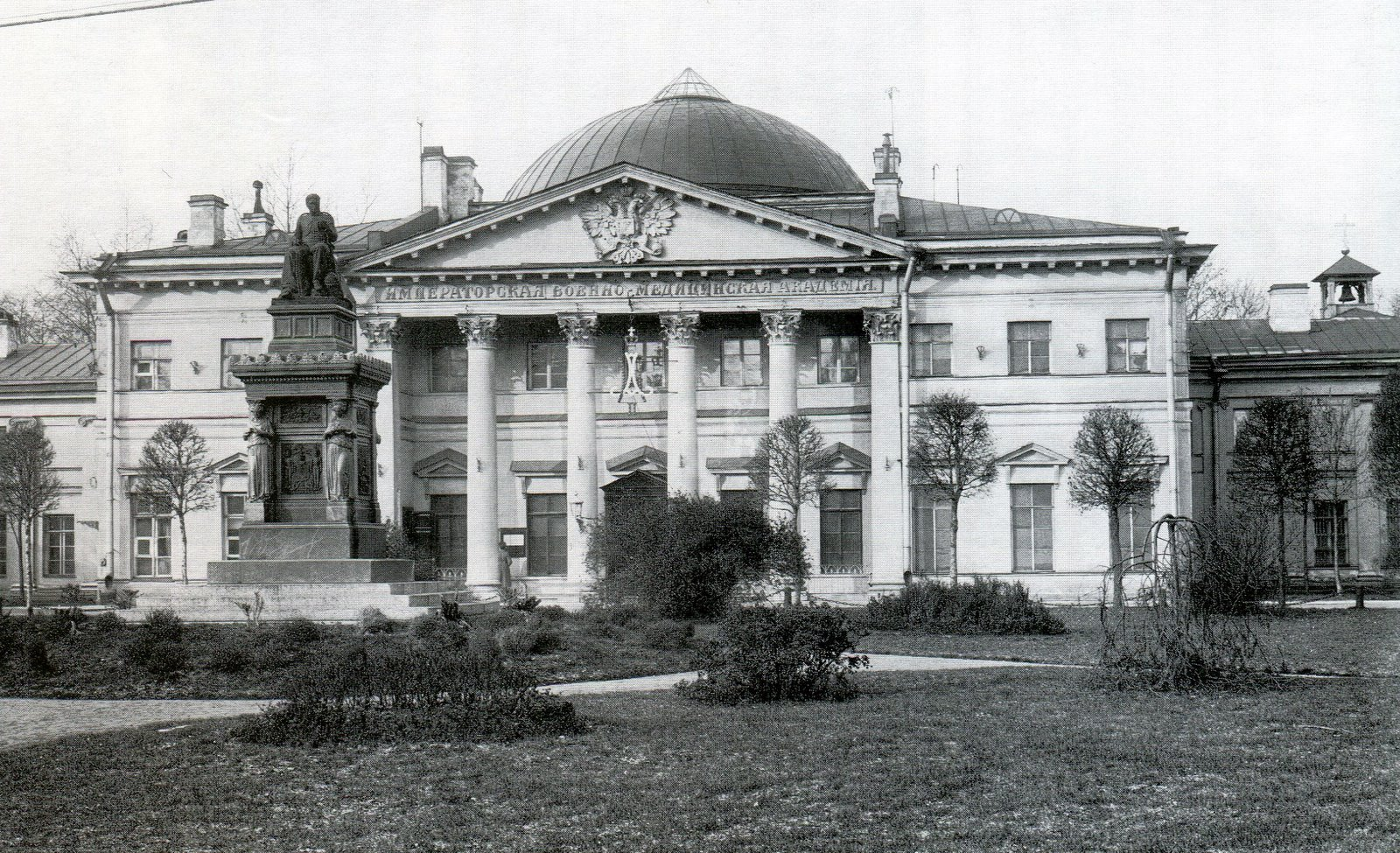
Monument to Sir James Wylie in front of the Imperial Military Medical Academy, 1914

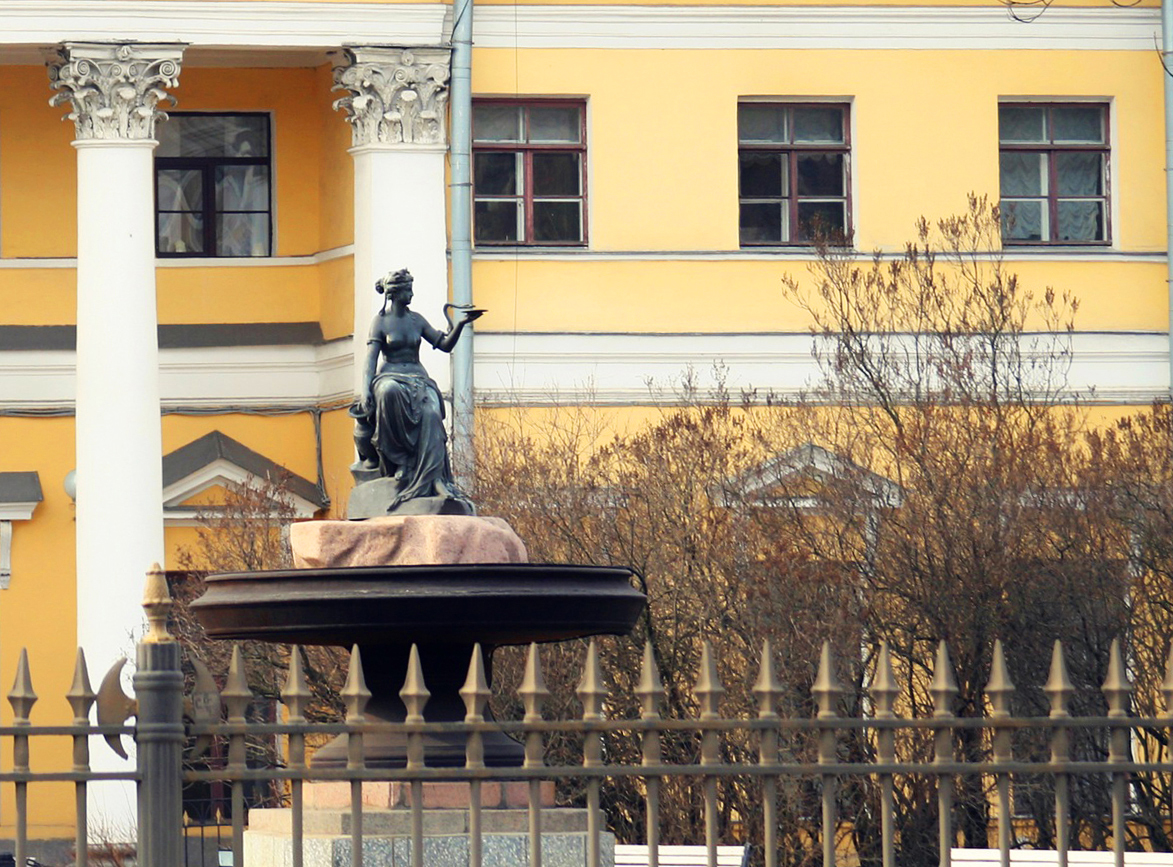
Statue of Hygieia in front of the S.M. Kirov Military Medical Academy

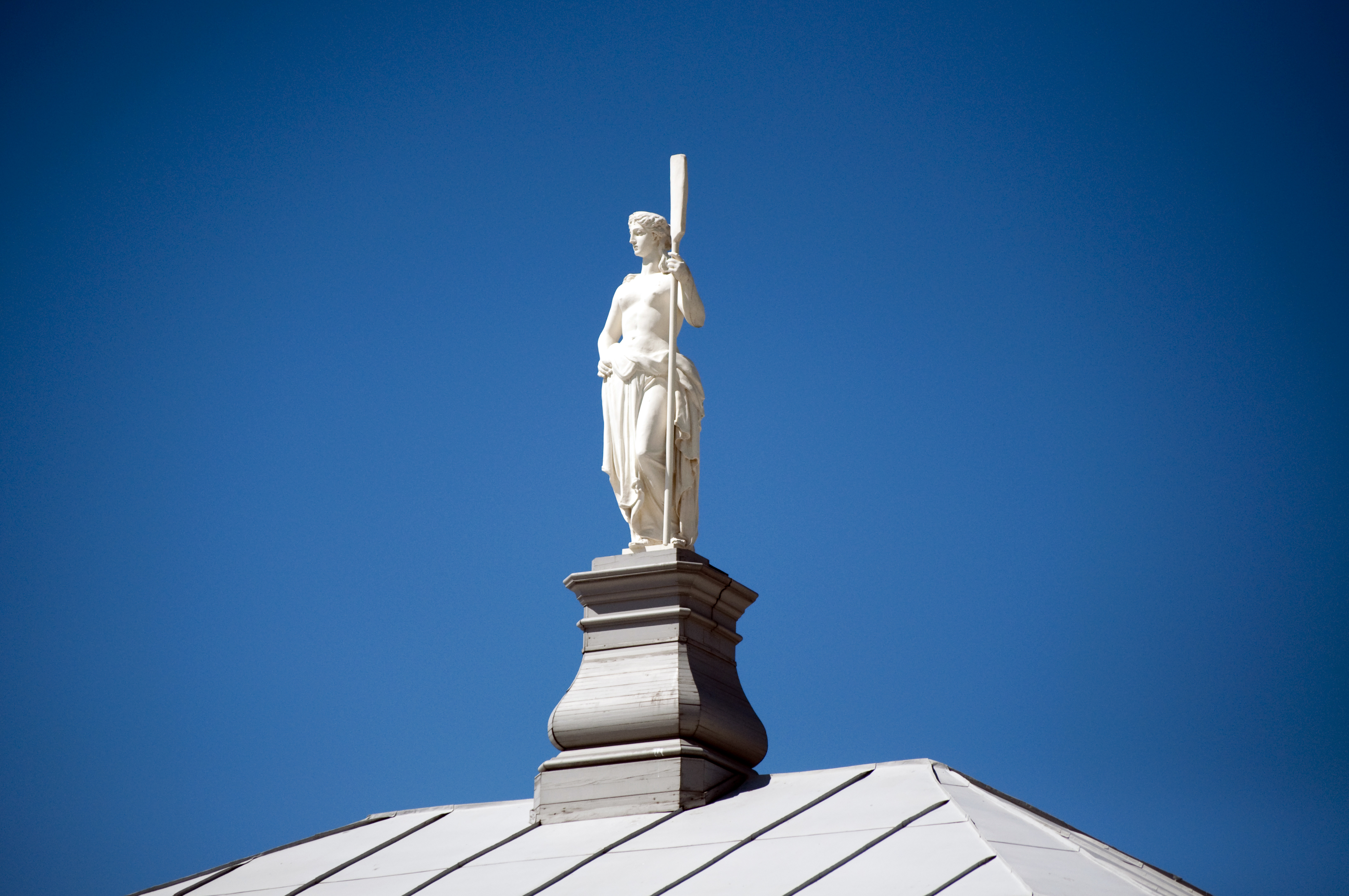
Allegory of Navigation at the top of the Boat House in Saint Petersburg

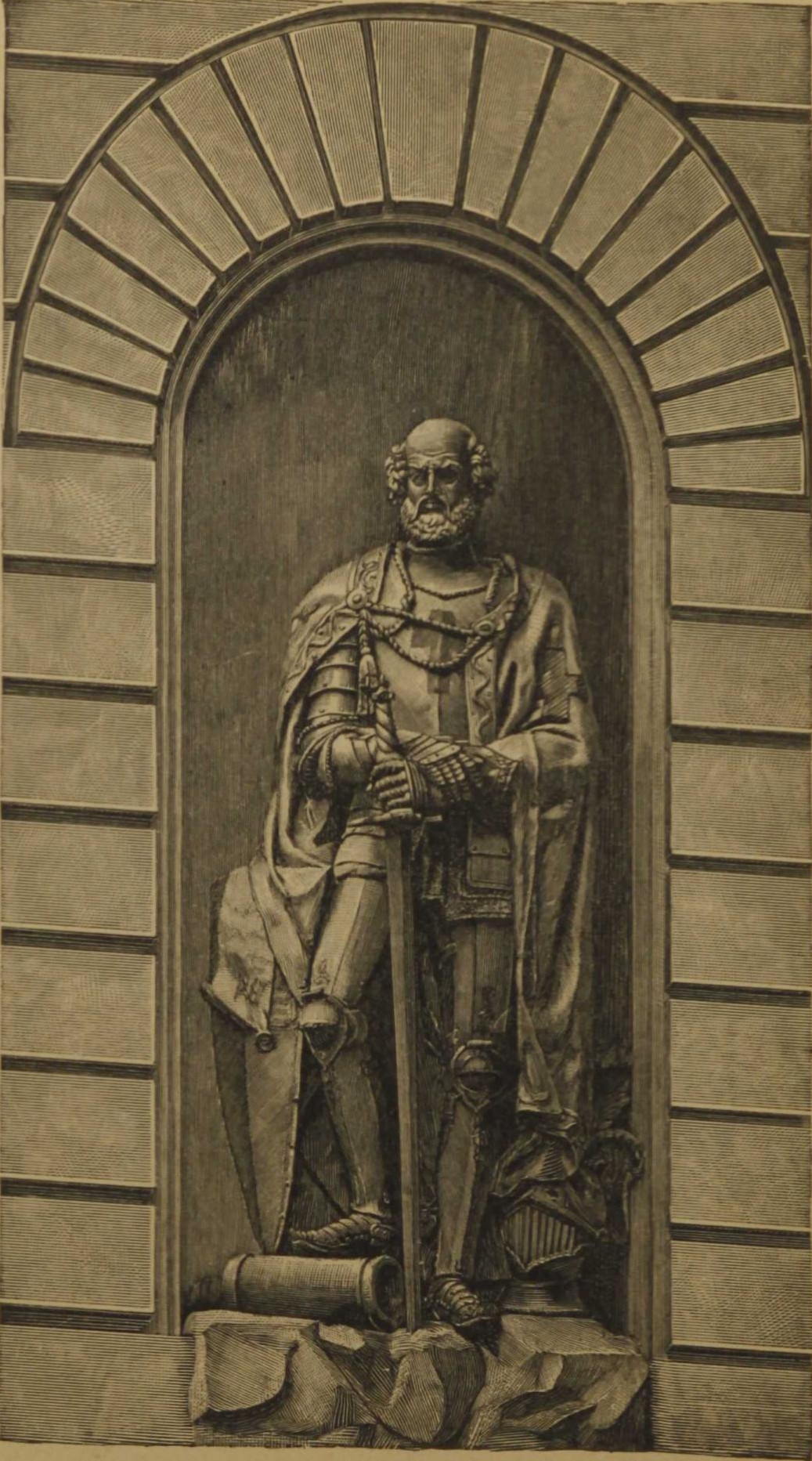
The original statue of Wolter von Plettenberg on the House of the Livonian Noble Corporation

== Sources ==
General writings

- Jensen, David (December 1903). "Автобиография ваятеля Д. И. Иенсена (1816–1902)". Russky Arkhiv (in Russian). Moscow: University Typography. pp. 653–658.
- Krivdina, Olga A. (2006). Ваятели и их судьбы (in Russian). Saint Petersburg: Sudarynya. pp. 39–70. ISBN 5-88718-003-X. OCLC 266515255.

Reference books

- Bulgakov, Fyodor I. [in Russian] (1889). "Иенсен, Давид Иванович". Наши художники (in Russian). Vol. 1. St. Petersburg: Suvorin Typography. pp. 160–161. OCLC 38661216.
- Kondakov, Sergei N. [in Russian] (1915). Юбилейный справочник Императорской Академии художеств. 1764–1914 (in Russian). Vol. 2. Saint Petersburg: Golike and Vilborg. pp. 255–256. OCLC 707072219.
- Somov, Andrei I. [in Russian] (1894). "Йенсен (Давид Иванович)". In Arsenyev, Konstantin K.; Petrushevsky, Fyodor F. [in Russian] (eds.). Brockhaus and Efron Encyclopedic Dictionary (in Russian). Vol. XIIIa. Saint Petersburg: Brockhaus and Efron. p. 640.
