= Vladimir Lutchenko =

Russian ice hockey player (born 1949)

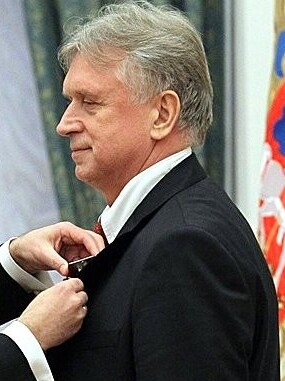
- Lutchenko in 2011
- Born: 2 January 1949 (age 77) Ramenskoye, Russian SFSR, Soviet Union
- Height: 6 ft 1 in (185 cm)
- Weight: 202 lb (92 kg; 14 st 6 lb)
- Position: Defence
- Shot: Left
- Played for: HC CSKA Moscow
- National team: Soviet Union
- Playing career: 1967–1981
Medal record
Men's ice hockey
Representing Soviet Union
Olympic Games
Gold medal – first place	1972 Sapporo	Team
Gold medal – first place	1976 Innsbruck	Team
World Championships
Gold medal – first place	1969 Stockholm
Gold medal – first place	1970 Sweden
Gold medal – first place	1971 Switzerland
Silver medal – second place	1972 Czechoslovakia
Gold medal – first place	1973 Soviet Union
Gold medal – first place	1974 Finland
Gold medal – first place	1975 West Germany
Silver medal – second place	1976 Poland
Bronze medal – third place	1977 Austria
Gold medal – first place	1978 Czechoslovakia
Gold medal – first place	1979 Soviet Union

Vladimir Yakovlevich Lutchenko (Russian: Владимир Яковлевич Лутченко; born 2 January 1949) is a retired Soviet ice hockey player who played in the Soviet Hockey League.

Lutchenko played for HC CSKA Moscow. He was inducted into the Russian and Soviet Hockey Hall of Fame in 1970. Lutchenko competed at the 1972 Winter Olympics and 1976 Winter Olympics. Additionally he played against Canada in the 1972 Summit Series and the 1974 Summit Series.
