= Alexander Sidelnikov =

Russian ice hockey player (1950–2003)

Personal information
- Full name: Alexander Nikolaevich Sidelnikov
- Born: August 12, 1950 Solnechnogorsk, Russian SFSR, Soviet Union
- Died: June 23, 2003 (aged 52) Kholmogory, Russia
Medal record
Men's ice hockey
Representing Soviet Union
Olympic Games
Gold medal – first place	1976 Innsbruck	Team
World Championships
Gold medal – first place	1973 Soviet Union
Gold medal – first place	1974 Finland
Silver medal – second place	1976 Poland
Bronze medal – third place	1977 Austria
Universiade
Gold medal – first place	1972 Lake Placid

Alexander Nikolaevich Sidelnikov (August 12, 1950 – June 23, 2003) was a Soviet ice hockey player who played goaltender in the Soviet Hockey League. He played for Krylya Sovetov Moscow. He was inducted into the Russian and Soviet Hockey Hall of Fame in 1976. He won a gold medal at the 1976 Winter Olympics.

Sidelnikov won 4 medals, 2 gold and one silver and bronze, at the World Ice Hockey Championships, in each case as back up to hockey goaltender legend Vladislav Tretiak. Notably he was the starting goalie for the USSR's stunning loss to Poland on April 8, 1976, being one of the great upsets of World Championship history.

== Career statistics ==
=== International ===
Year	Team	Event	GP	W	L	T	MIN	GA	SO	GAA	SV%
1972	Soviet Union	Universiade	-	-	-	-	-	-	-	-	—
1972	Soviet Union	Summit Series	0	0	0	0	0	0	0	-	—
1973	Soviet Union	WC	3	3	0	0	180	4	1	1.33	-
1974	Soviet Union	1974 Summit Series	1	1	0	0	60	2	0	2.00	.917
1974	Soviet Union	WC	3	2	0	0	160	6	0	2.25	.914
1976	Soviet Union	OLY	2	2	0	0	120	4	0	2.00	-
1976	Soviet Union	WC	1	0	1	0	24	4	0	10.20	.667
1977	Soviet Union	WC	4	1	0	0	120	6	0	3.00	-
Senior totals			14	9	1	0	664	26	1	2.35	—
