= Vyacheslav Anisin =

Russian ice hockey player (born 1951)

- Born: 11 July 1951 (age 75) Moscow, Soviet Union
- Height: 5 ft 8 in (173 cm)
- Weight: 168 lb (76 kg; 12 st 0 lb)
- Position: Centre
- Shot: Left
- Played for: HC CSKA Moscow; Krylya Sovetov Moscow; SKA Leningrad; HC Spartak Moscow; KHL Medveščak Zagreb; HC Milano Saima
- National team: Soviet Union
- Playing career: 1969–1990
Medal record
World Championships
Silver medal – second place	1972 Czechoslovakia
Gold medal – first place	1973 Soviet Union
Gold medal – first place	1974 Finland
Gold medal – first place	1975 West Germany

Vyacheslav Mikhailovich Anisin (born 11 July 1951) is a Russian retired professional ice hockey player.

Anisin played in the Soviet Championship League for HC CSKA Moscow, Krylya Sovetov Moscow, SKA Leningrad and HC Spartak Moscow. He would later play in the Yugoslav Ice Hockey League for KHL Medveščak and in Serie A in Italy for HC Milano Saima.

He also played for the Soviet team during the 1972 Summit Series and the 1974 Summit Series against Canada. He was inducted into the Russian and Soviet Hockey Hall of Fame in 1973.

== Personal life ==
Anisin was born in Moscow, Russia. His son Mikhail Anisin is also an ice hockey player and currently plays for UHC Dynamo of the Kontinental Hockey League. His daughter Marina Anissina is a former European, World and Olympic champion ice dancer who represented France. She retired after winning gold in the 2002 Winter Olympics in Salt Lake City, Utah.

Anisin was a recipient of the Soviet Medal "For Labour Valour".

Awards
Preceded by Vladimir Petrov	Soviet Scoring Champion; 1974	Succeeded by Vladimir Petrov
