= Alexander Bodunov =

Russian ice hockey player (1951–2017)

- Born: 3 June 1951 Moscow, RSFSR, USSR
- Died: 11 May 2017 (aged 65)
- National team: Soviet Union
- Playing career: 1969–1982
Medal record
World Championships
Gold medal – first place	1973 Soviet Union	Team
Gold medal – first place	1974 Finland	Team

Alexander Ivanovich Bodunov (Russian: Алекса́ндр Ива́нович Бодуно́в; 3 June 1951 – 11 May 2017) was a professional ice hockey player who played in the Soviet Hockey League.

He played for Krylya Sovetov Moscow. He also played for the Soviet team during the 1972 Summit Series and 1974 Summit Series against Canada and was a two-time world hockey champion in the USSR national team (1973, 1974).
