= Boris Mikhailov (ice hockey) =

Soviet ice hockey player (born 1944)

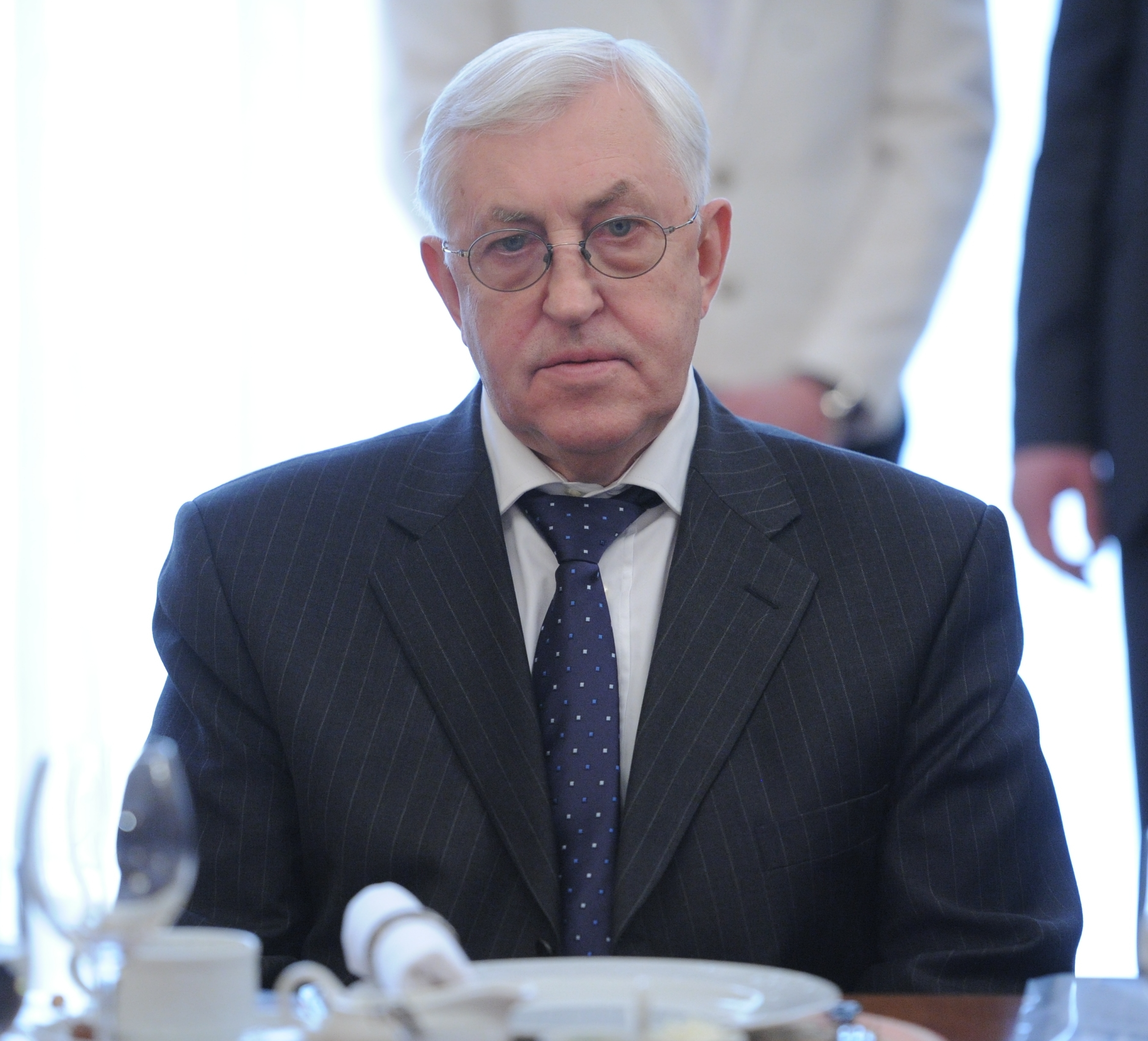
- Mikhailov in 2012
- Born: October 6, 1944 (age 82) Moscow, Russian SFSR, Soviet Union
- Height: 5 ft 10 in (178 cm)
- Weight: 169 lb (77 kg; 12 st 1 lb)
- Position: Right wing
- Shot: Left
- Played for: Kristall Saratov; HK Lokomotiv Moscow; HC CSKA Moscow
- National team: Soviet Union
- Playing career: 1962–1981
Medal record
Men's ice hockey
Representing Soviet Union
Olympic Games
| Gold medal – first place | 1972 Sapporo | Team |
| Gold medal – first place | 1976 Innsbruck | Team |
| Silver medal – second place | 1980 Lake Placid | Team |
World Championships
| Gold medal – first place | 1969 Sweden |
| Gold medal – first place | 1970 Sweden |
| Gold medal – first place | 1971 Switzerland |
| Silver medal – second place | 1972 Czechoslovakia |
| Gold medal – first place | 1973 Soviet Union |
| Gold medal – first place | 1974 Finland |
| Gold medal – first place | 1975 West Germany |
| Silver medal – second place | 1976 Poland |
| Bronze medal – third place | 1977 Austria |
| Gold medal – first place | 1978 Czechoslovakia |
| Gold medal – first place | 1979 Soviet Union |

Boris Petrovich Mikhailov (Russian: Бори́с Петро́вич Миха́йлов; born October 6, 1944) is a former Russian ice hockey player.

In 2000, he was inducted into the IIHF Hall of Fame.

== Career ==
Mikhailov played right wing on the top Soviet line of the 1970s for powerhouse CSKA Moscow, along with left winger Valeri Kharlamov and center Vladimir Petrov. During Soviet League play, he played in 572 games, scoring a record 428 goals along with 224 assists for a record 652 points.

On the Soviet national team, he played 14 seasons, most of them as captain. He scored over 200 goals with the national team, second only to Alexander Maltsev. He led his team to the Olympic gold medal in 1972 and 1976, a silver medal in 1980, eight IIHF World Championships (1969, 1970, 1971, 1973, 1974, 1975, 1978, 1979), and nine Izvestia championships. Mikhailov's last game with the Soviet national team was played in front of 14,000 people at Luzhniki Ice Palace. His teammates carried him around the rink on their shoulders to a thunderous ovation.

== Post-playing career ==
Upon his retirement from professional play, Mikhailov became a coach. In 1981–1984, 1992–1997, 2002–2005, and in March and November 2006, he was the head coach of SKA (St. Petersburg) (third medalist MHL 1994) and the head coach of CSKA from 1998–2001. From November 2007 to 2009, he was head coach of HC "Metallurg" Novokuznetsk.

Under his leadership (1992–1995, 2001–2002), the Russian national team won gold medals in the 1993 World Championships and finished second in 2002. He was head coach of the Russian team at the World Championships in 2005 and 2006 and at the Olympic Games in 2006.

Since 2011, together with Vladimir Petrov, Vladislav Tretiak, Georgy Poltavchenko, Sergei Egorov and Artur Chilingarov, he has been a member of the board of trustees of the International Tournament in Ice Hockey Arctic Cup.

== Personal life ==
Boris graduated from the Moscow State Academy of Physical Culture in 1979. His son Yegor Mikhailov is also a hockey player.

In the 2004 Disney biopic Miracle, he is portrayed by former NHL player Sasha Lakovic.

Mikhailov is a member of PutinTeam, Alexander Ovechkin's group that promotes President Putin and his policies.

== Career statistics ==
=== Regular season ===
| | | | Regular season |
| Season | Team | League | GP | G | A | Pts | PIM |
|---|---|---|---|---|---|---|---|
| 1962–63 | Avangard Saratov | Soviet II | 26 | 20 | 0 | 20 | 25 |
| 1963–64 | Avangard Saratov | Soviet III | | 4 |
| 1964–65 | Avangard Saratov | Soviet II | 38 | 23 | 2 | 25 | 50 |
| 1965–66 | Lokomotiv Moscow | Soviet | 28 | 18 | 8 | 26 | 8 |
| 1966–67 | Lokomotiv Moscow | Soviet | 44 | 19 | 7 | 26 | 16 |
| 1967–68 | CSKA Moscow | Soviet | 43 | 29 | 16 | 45 | 16 |
| 1968–69 | CSKA Moscow | Soviet | 42 | 36 | 14 | 50 | 14 |
| 1969–70 | CSKA Moscow | Soviet | 44 | 40 | 15 | 55 | 22 |
| 1970–71 | CSKA Moscow | Soviet | 40 | 32 | 15 | 47 | 16 |
| 1971–72 | CSKA Moscow | Soviet | 31 | 20 | 13 | 33 | 18 |
| 1972–73 | CSKA Moscow | Soviet | 30 | 24 | 13 | 37 | 20 |
| 1973–74 | CSKA Moscow | Soviet | 31 | 18 | 9 | 27 | 12 |
| 1974–75 | CSKA Moscow | Soviet | 35 | 40 | 11 | 51 | 30 |
| 1975–76 | CSKA Moscow | Soviet | 36 | 31 | 8 | 39 | 43 |
| 1976–77 | CSKA Moscow | Soviet | 34 | 28 | 23 | 51 | 10 |
| 1977–78 | CSKA Moscow | Soviet | 35 | 32 | 20 | 52 | 18 |
| 1978–79 | CSKA Moscow | Soviet | 43 | 30 | 24 | 54 | 23 |
| 1979–80 | CSKA Moscow | Soviet | 41 | 27 | 23 | 50 | 19 |
| 1980–81 | CSKA Moscow | Soviet | 15 | 4 | 5 | 9 | 4 |
| Soviet totals | | | 572 | 428 | 224 | 652 | 289 |

=== International ===
| Year | Team | Event | GP | G | A | Pts | PIM |
|---|---|---|---|---|---|---|---|
| 1969 | Soviet Union | WC | 9 | 9 | 5 | 14 | 6 |
| 1970 | Soviet Union | WC | 10 | 7 | 3 | 10 | 2 |
| 1971 | Soviet Union | WC | 9 | 7 | 3 | 10 | 2 |
| 1972 | Soviet Union | OLY | 3 | 2 | 0 | 2 | 0 |
| 1972 | Soviet Union | WC | 10 | 11 | 2 | 13 | 6 |
| 1972 | Soviet Union | SS | 8 | 2 | 3 | 5 | 9 |
| 1973 | Soviet Union | WC | 10 | 16 | 13 | 29 | 4 |
| 1974 | Soviet Union | WC | 10 | 8 | 8 | 16 | 16 |
| 1974 | Soviet Union | SS | 7 | 4 | 2 | 6 | 0 |
| 1975 | Soviet Union | WC | 9 | 7 | 8 | 15 | 2 |
| 1976 | Soviet Union | OLY | 6 | 3 | 1 | 4 | 2 |
| 1976 | Soviet Union | WC | 10 | 7 | 6 | 13 | 8 |
| 1977 | Soviet Union | WC | 10 | 12 | 7 | 19 | 4 |
| 1978 | Soviet Union | WC | 10 | 9 | 3 | 12 | 6 |
| 1979 | Soviet Union | WC | 8 | 4 | 8 | 12 | 0 |
| 1980 | Soviet Union | OLY | 7 | 6 | 5 | 11 | 2 |
| World & Olympic totals | | | 121 | 109 | 72 | 181 | 60 |

== Awards and recognitions ==
- Soviet MVP: 1978, 1977
- Top Soviet goal scorer: 1975, 1976, 1978
- 8-time Soviet All Star
- Best forward at the IIHF World Championships: 1973, 1979
- Top scorer at the IIHF World Championships: 1974
- Top goal scorer at the IIHF World Championships: 1977, 1978
- MVP at the 1979 Challenge Cup between the Soviet Union and the NHL All Stars
- Soviet Captain: 1972–1980
- Inducted into the IIHF Hall of Fame in 2000

Mikhailov was also one of the very few to receive the highest order of the Soviet Union, being awarded the Order of Lenin in 1978. He was also awarded the Medal "For Labour Valour" in 1969, Order of the Badge of Honour in 1972, Order of the Red Banner of Labour in 1975 and the Order "For Merit to the Fatherland", 4th class in 2004.

Awards
| Preceded by Helmut Balderis | Soviet MVP; 1978, 1979 | Succeeded by Sergei Makarov |
