= 1974 Summit Series =

Competition between Soviet and Canadian professional ice hockey players

	1	2	3	4	5	6	7	8	Total
Canada	3	4	5	5	2	2	4	2	1-4-3 (27)
Soviet Union	3	1	8	5	3	5	4	3	4-1-3 (32)
- Location(s): Canada (1–4); Soviet Union (5–8)
- Coaches: Billy Harris (Canada); Boris Kulagin (USSR)
- Referees: Tom Brown (Canada); Victor Dombrowski (USSR); Waldo Szczapek (Poland); Josef Kompalla (West Germany)
- Dates: September 17 – October 6, 1974
- Hall of Famers: Canada: Frank Mahovlich; Gordie Howe; Bobby Hull; Gerry Cheevers; Mark Howe; Soviet Union: Valeri Kharlamov; Vladislav Tretiak; Alexander Yakushev
- Networks: CBC, CTV

The 1974 Summit Series was the second competition between Soviet and Canadian professional ice hockey players. It used the same format as the 1972 Summit Series, with four games across Canada and four in Moscow. The Soviet team won the series 4–1–3, with Canada's lone victory coming at Maple Leaf Gardens in Toronto. The series was proposed and promoted by the World Hockey Association to draw national attention to the league. Therefore the Canadian roster was selected from the World Hockey Association instead of the National Hockey League.

The Soviets won the series 4–1–3. The series included a game-six fight and game-seven disputed goal, but after the first four games in Canada, Dick Beddoes concluded: "Canada must have a great deal of admiration for Team 74. They did much better than the skeptics expected ... They have played good and entertaining hockey against a younger Russian team".

== Organization and preparation ==
Negotiations for the event started at the 1974 World Junior Ice Hockey Championships, when Andrey Starovoytov of the Soviet Union approached Jack Devine and Gordon Juckes of the Canadian Amateur Hockey Association regarding another series. Initially the event was to be six-games, but it was later extended to eight. Team Canada players were each paid C$6,000 for participating in the event.

Team Canada prepared for the series by playing exhibition games against an all-star team of players from the Western Hockey League. They played five games:

- September 5, 1974 - Team Canada 7-2 win vs Western Hockey League All-Stars in Medicine Hat (attendance 5115)
- September 6, 1974 - Team Canada 6-5 win vs Western Hockey League All-Stars in Brandon, Manitoba
- September 8, 1974 - Team Canada 2-3 loss vs Western Hockey League All-Stars in Calgary (attendance 8000)
- September 10, 1974 - Team Canada 6-1 win vs Western Hockey League All-Stars in Saskatoon
- September 12, 1974 - Team Canada 8-0 win vs Western Hockey League All-Stars in Edmonton

Prior to the series the Soviet team played two games against the Finland men's national ice hockey team as part of the 1974 edition of the Izvestia Cup tournament:

- September 10, 1974 - Team Soviet 8-1 win vs Finland in Moscow
- September 13, 1974 - Team Soviet 4-3 win vs Finland in Moscow

== Players ==
Team Canada 1974 had three veterans of the Summit Series; Paul Henderson, Frank Mahovlich, and Pat Stapleton. Additionally the team had two legends, Bobby Hull and the 46-year-old Gordie Howe who played with his sons Mark Howe and Marty Howe.

Paul Shmyr played on defence, along with five-time Stanley Cup champion J.C. Tremblay. The goaltender was two-time Stanley Cup champion and future Hall of Famer Gerry Cheevers.

The main criticism of the Canadian player selections is that they were older and seemingly near the end of their careers.

The Soviet team was composed of Olympic and World Champion gold medalists. Three players became Hockey Hall of Fame inductees: Vladislav Tretiak, Valeri Kharlamov and Alexander Yakushev. Additionally, several Soviet all-stars had played in the 1972 Summit Series, including Vladimir Petrov, Boris Mikhailov, Alexander Maltsev, Valeri Vasiliev and Yuri Lebedev.

== Series summary ==
=== In Canada ===
The first training session of the USSR national team drew a full arena of spectators, including the players from the WHA national team, who were led by Bobby Hull. Tickets for the Canadian games sold out months in advance. In Quebec, the tickets were drawn in a lottery. People paid two dollars for a chance to get a ticket to the game; out of two million who bought a lottery ticket, only 15,000 got a ticket. In Winnipeg, $10 tickets were sold before the game for double their value.

=== Game one ===
The first game was played before an "emotional" full house at the Colisée de Québec, home of the Quebec Nordiques. The final result was a 3–3 tie. Canadian coach Billy Harris said he was "satisfied" with the result, and Soviet coach Boris Kulagin concurred, saying it was "an interesting and exciting game" and "We too are satisfied with the outcome tonight."

The star of the night was Bobby Hull, the perennial all-star who had been banned from the 1972 Team Canada because he had recently signed with the WHA. He scored two goals, including the game-tying goal with only 5:12 left. He stated, "Never been so tight before a game in my life, not even a 7th game of a Stanley Cup final." Hull was named the Canadian MVP of the game.

The game ended on a disappointing note for Frank Mahovlich, who had a clean breakaway on Soviet goalie Vladislav Tretiak with 36 seconds remaining, only to shoot the puck less than inch wide of the net: "I was trying to put the puck up high" he explained "But Tretiak's body was twisted like a pretzel ... So I hammered the puck past the post. He made his move. I made mine, and he beat me."

=== Game two ===
Just like in 1972, the second game was played at Maple Leaf Gardens before a capacity crowd and the Canadians triumphed with a 4–1 victory. Ralph Backstrom opened the game with his first of four series goals (and 8 points), leading the Soviets coaches and players to say he was one of Canada's best players.

One controversial event occurred two minutes into the third period. Vladimir Petrov's shot clearly scored hitting the back crossbar and quickly bouncing out of the net, and the red light went on. However, Canadian referee Tom Brown, and his linesman, over ruled the goal claiming he did not see the puck. Coach Kulagin, who admitted the goal would not have changed the final result, was highly critical of Brown and demanded he be replaced for the next game. Brown later admitted his mistake and apologized.

=== Game three ===
In the third game, the Soviet national team won 8–5. Cheevers sat out the third game because his father-in-law was in hospital after suffering a heart attack while watching game two. Don McLeod was the substitute.

Canada had a power-play during the final 1:04 due to Vladimir Lutchenko's holding penalty, and then Harris pulled the goalie McLeod for an extra skater, but they could not score. (Note: Some statistics indicate that Gilles Gratton played in game 3 of the series, but this mistake is a result of the fact that there is no official statistical record, only next day newspaper reports. Actually, during the final 1:04 minutes of the game, Team Canada had a power play and pulled their goalie Don McLeod for a 6 on 4 skater advantage. So their net was empty, and Gratton did not get any ice time.)

=== Game four ===
In the first period of the fourth game, Bobby Hull scored a hat trick. After the first period, the hosts led 5–2, but the Soviet national team pulled out a 5–5 draw, ending the Canadian part of the series with 17:17 points.

=== In the USSR ===
Before the Moscow part of the Series, the Canadian national team played two friendly matches in Helsinki and Gothenburg, defeating the Finns and the Swedes 8–3 and 4–3, respectively. The Canadians arrived in Moscow on September 27; about three thousand Canadian fans also arrived. Tickets cost from 10 to 50 rubles (though there were no tickets at the box office; they were distributed among organizations). However, people, hoping for an extra ticket, were on duty at the Luzhniki Stadium continuously, right up to the last game of the series.

=== Game five ===
Due to the injury of Alexander Yakushev, Lebedev and Bodunov now played with Shadrin, and Anisin — with Maltsev and Vikulov. The Anisin—Maltsev—Vikulov trio opened the scoring in the first game, and then Maltsev realized the majority. The game ended 3–2.

=== Game six ===
The sixth game featured an increased number of penalties taken by Team Canada. The Canadians received 33 penalty minutes per game (while the Soviets received 9). Mark Howe met Petrov harshly; in retaliation Vasilyev thoroughly crushed Bruce MacGregor. This game was overshadowed by the post-game fight between Rick Ley and Kharlamov. The latter left the ice with his face covered in blood. Many Soviet hockey players refused to shake hands with their rivals. The next day, Boris Kulagin said that "the players who inflicted injuries on Soviet hockey players deserve to be suspended from matches." The Canadians apologized; the incident was hushed up. At the same time, the Canadian side expressed dissatisfaction with the refereeing. The Soviets would win 5–2.

=== Game seven ===
In the seventh game, the Soviets played four units for the first time under Kulagin. Hull scored a goal at the same time as the final siren, giving the guests a chance for a draw, but referee Brown didn't count the goal.

=== Game eight ===
In the last game, Kulagin gave the opportunity to play to those who until then had been sitting in reserve. The game ended 3–2. The Soviet national team won three of the four Moscow games, tying the other.

== Aftermath ==
In an interview with Soviet Sport, Boris Kulagin warned not to overestimate the importance of the Soviet victory: "This series showed that our best players surpass Canadian professionals in the sum of all the components that make up hockey. But let's think about one detail: we are stronger than the top 20-25 players, and if we take 50 or 100 hockey players on each side? I'm afraid that perhaps no one will give a definite answer. And I urge both coaches and players to roll up their sleeves so that in a few years any major league club team can safely go on the ice against any foreign team. And not just 'calmly go out', but win!"

== Schedule and results ==
=== Game one ===
September 17, 1974	Canada	3–3 (1-0, 1-3, 1-0)	Soviet Union	Colisée de Québec; Attendance: 10958

Gerry Cheevers	Goalies	Vladislav Tretiak
John McKenzie 1 (André Lacroix, Bobby Hull) 12:13 Bobby Hull 1 (Bill Walton, Gordie Howe) (PP) 32:07 Bobby Hull 2 (André Lacroix, John McKenzie) 54:18 Goals Vladimir Lutchenko 1 (Gennady Tsygankov, Sergei Kapustin) 27:46 Valeri Kharlamov 1 (Valeri Vasiliev) 34:04 (PP) Vladimir Petrov 1 (Alexander Gusev, Valeri Kharlamov) 37:10 (PP)
10 min	Penalties	8 min
9, 10, 15 = 34	Shots	8, 11, 9 = 28

=== Game two ===
September 19, 1974	Canada	4–1 (2-0, 1-1, 1-0)	Soviet Union	Maple Leaf Gardens, Toronto; Attendance: 16485

Gerry Cheevers	Goalies	Vladislav Tretiak
Ralph Backstrom 1 (Gordie Howe, Mark Howe) 4:31 André Lacroix 1 (John McKenzie, J.C. Tremblay) (PP) 10:49; Bobby Hull 3 (André Lacroix, (John McKenzie) 22:50; Penalty Shot : Mike Walton - (no goal) 28:54 J.C. Tremblay 1 (André Lacroix, Bobby Hull) (PP) 57:03 Goals Alexander Yakushev 1 (Vladimir Shadrin, Yuri Lebedev) 33:09
12 min	Penalties	6 min
10, 16, 7 = 33	Shots	13, 8, 9 = 30

=== Game three ===
September 21, 1974	Canada	5–8 (1-1, 1-3, 3-4)	Soviet Union	Winnipeg Arena; Attendance: 11000

Don McLeod (58:56) empty net (1:04)	Goalies	Vladislav Tretiak
Bruce MacGregor 1 (Paul Henderson) 14:58 Tom Webster 1 (Serge Bernier, Marc Tardif) 32:40; Paul Henderson 1 (Jim Harrison) 54:31; Paul Henderson 2 (Jim Harrison, Bruce MacGregor) 55:04 Serge Bernier 1 (Tom Webster, Al Hamilton) 56:01 Goals Penalty Shot - Alexander Maltsev (no goal) 6:30 Alexander Yakushev 2 (Vladimir Shadrin) 17:25; Boris Mikhailov 1 (Vladimir Petrov) 21:23; Valeri Vasiliev 1 (Boris Mikhailov, Vladimir Petrov) 35:14; Alexander Maltsev 1 (Vyacheslav Anisin) 35:31; Alexander Yakushev 3 (Vladimir Shadrin) 42:35; Alexander Bodunov 1 48:44; Alexander Yakushev 4 51:27 Yuri Lebedev 1 (Vladimir Lutchenko) 58:05
12 min	Penalties	10 min
8, 14, 12 = 34	Shots	11, 16, 12 = 39

=== Game four ===
September 23, 1974	Canada	5–5 (5-2, 0-1, 0-2)	Soviet Union	Pacific Coliseum, Vancouver; Attendance: 15772

Gerry Cheevers	Goalies	Vladislav Tretiak
Gordie Howe 1 (Ralph Backstrom, Pat Stapleton) 4:20 Bobby Hull 4 (Frank Mahovlich) (PP) 12:45; Bobby Hull 5 (Pat Stapleton) 15:11; Frank Mahovlich 1 (Serge Bernier, Rejean Houle) 17:10 Bobby Hull 6 (André Lacroix) 17:45 Goals Valeri Vasiliev 2 (Valeri Kharlamov) 3:34 Boris Mikhailov 2 (Vladimir Petrov) (PP) 5:59; Alexander Yakushev 5 (Yuri Lebedev) 31:04; Alexander Maltsev 2 56:08 Alexander Gusev 1 (Boris Mikhailov, Vladimir Petrov) 56:59
12 min	Penalties	8 min
12, 10, 6 = 28	Shots	11, 8, 9 = 28

=== Game five ===
October 1, 1974	Soviet Union	3–2 (1-0, 1-1, 1-1)	Canada	Luzhniki Palace of Sports, Moscow; Attendance: 14200

Vladislav Tretiak	Goalies	Gerry Cheevers
Alexander Maltsev 3 (Vladimir Vikulov, Vyacheslav Anisin) 5:34 Alexander Maltsev 4 (Vladimir Shadrin, Vladimir Vikulov) (PP) 35:04 Alexander Gusev 2 51:48 Goals Gordie Howe 2 (Ralph Backstrom, Mark Howe) 20:15 Mark Howe 1 (Paul Shmyr) (PP) 58:10
10 min	Penalties	24 min
9, 10, 8 = 27	Shots	8, 4, 4 = 16

=== Game six ===
October 3, 1974	Soviet Union	5–2 (2-1, 2-1, 1-0)	Canada	Luzhniki Palace of Sports, Moscow

Vladislav Tretiak	Goalies	Gerry Cheevers
Boris Mikhailov 3 (Valeri Kharlamov) 0:34 Valeri Vasiliev 3 (PP) 2:43; Vyacheslav Anisin 1 (Vladimir Vikulov) 28:22; Yuri Shatalov 1 (Gennady Tsygankov) (PP) 33:57 Valeri Kharlamov 2 (Vladimir Vikulov) 53:00 Goals Rejean Houle 1 (Paul Shmyr) 15:56; Gordie Howe 3 (Mark Howe) 26:15
9 min	Penalties	33 min
14, 8, 7 = 29	Shots	13, 9, 6 = 28

=== Game seven ===
October 5, 1974	Soviet Union	4–4 (2-1, 2-2, 0-1)	Canada	Luzhniki Palace of Sports, Moscow

Vladislav Tretiak	Goalies	Gerry Cheevers
Vyacheslav Anisin 2 (Vladimir Lutchenko) 3:34 Yuri Tyurin 1 (Yuri Lebedev, Alexander Yakushev) 6:47; Alexander Gusev 3 (Vladimir Petrov, Valeri Kharlamov) (PP) 27:20 Boris Mikhailov 4 (Vladimir Petrov, Valeri Kharlamov) 27:59 Goals Tom Webster 2 (André Lacroix) 17:42 Ralph Backstrom 2 (Gordie Howe, Mark Howe) 22:55; Mark Howe 2 (J.C. Tremblay, Ralph Backstrom) (PP) 26:38 Ralph Backstrom 3 (J.C. Tremblay) 46:38
4 min	Penalties	2 min
11, 7, 3 = 21	Shots	10, 13, 7 = 30

=== Game eight ===
October 6, 1974	Soviet Union	3–2 (0-1, 1-0, 2-1)	Canada	Luzhniki Palace of Sports, Moscow

Alexander Sidelnikov	Goalies	Gerry Cheevers
Alexander Yakushev 6 (Vladimir Shadrin) (PP) 26:47; Viktor Shalimov 1 (PP) 40:54; Viktor Shalimov 2 (Alexander Yakushev) 46:59 / Goals / Bobby Hull 7 (J.C. Tremblay, Ralph Backstrom) (PP) 13:47 Ralph Backstrom 4 (Gordie Howe, Rick Ley) 52:42
10 min	Penalties	28 min
10, 12, 8 = 30	Shots	10, 8, 6 = 24

== Exhibition games ==
September 27, 1974	Finland	3–8 (0-3, 1-1, 2-4)	Canada	Helsinki, Finland; Attendance: 7000

Jorma Valtonen	Goalies	Don McLeod & Gilles Gratton (30 minutes each)
Lasse Oksanen (Pekka Marjamäki) (PP) 36:17 Seppo Ahokainen 40:58 Seppo Lindström (PP) 44:06 Goals Ralph Backstrom (Gordie Howe, Mark Howe) 0:47 Gordie Howe (Ralph Backstrom, Mark Howe) 6:47; André Lacroix (Bobby Hull) 11:25 André Lacroix (Bobby Hull) 38:24 Rejean Houle (Marty Howe) (PP) 48:06; Frank Mahovlich (Rick Ley) 52:04; Tom Webster (Mark Howe) 54:37 Frank Mahovlich 59:47
2 min	Penalties	6 min

September 29, 1974	Sweden	3–4 (0-3, 1-0, 2-1)	Canada	Gothenburg, Sweden; Attendance: 12273

Leif Holmqvist	Goalies	Gerry Cheevers & Don McLeod (30 minutes each)
Bjorn Johansson (Karl-Johan Sundqvist, Per-Olov Brasar) 24:46; Tord Lundström (Willy Lindström, Roland Bond) 44:02; Mats Åhlberg (Tord Lundström) 55:26 / Goals / Bobby Hull (André Lacroix, John McKenzie) 1:57; Mike Walton (Frank Mahovlich, Rejean Houle) 11:20; Gordie Howe (Mark Howe, Bobby Hull) 18:30 (PP) Frank Mahovlich (Rejean Houle, Pat Stapleton) 57:14
2 min	Penalties	4 min
11, 11, 11 = 33	Shots	15, 9, 10 = 34

October 8, 1974	Czechoslovakia	3–1 (2-0, 0-1, 1-0)	Canada	Sportovni Hala, Prague; Attendance: 14000

Jiri Holecek (15 mins) & Jiri Crha (45 mins)	Goalies	Don McLeod (35:15 mins) & Gilles Gratton (24:45 mins)
Jiří Bubla (Ivan Hlinka) 4:07; Ivan Hlinka (Bohuslav Ebermann) 9:55 Julius Hass (Eduard Novák) 43:16 / Goals / Tom Webster (Bobby Hull) 36:40
8 min	Penalties	8 min

== Statistics ==
SOURCE : 1974 Canada-USSR Summit Series

=== Canadians ===
Player	GP	G	A	Pts	PIM	TEAM
(Canada) Bobby Hull	8	7	2	9	0	Winnipeg Jets
(Canada) Ralph Backstrom	8	4	4	8	10	Chicago Cougars
(Canada) Gordie Howe	7	3	4	7	2	Houston Aeros
(Canada) André Lacroix	8	1	6	7	6	San Diego Mariners
(Canada) Mark Howe	7	2	4	6	4	Houston Aeros
(Canada) J.C. Tremblay	8	1	4	5	2	Quebec Nordiques
(Canada) John McKenzie	7	1	3	4	12	Vancouver Blazers
(Canada) Paul Henderson	7	2	1	3	0	Toronto Toros
(Canada) Tom Webster	4	2	1	3	6	New England Whalers
(Canada) Serge Bernier	8	1	2	3	4	Quebec Nordiques
(Canada) Pat Stapleton	8	0	2	2	12	Chicago Cougars
(Canada) Bruce MacGregor	5	1	1	2	5	Edmonton Oilers
(Canada) Frank Mahovlich	6	1	1	2	6	Toronto Toros
(Canada) Rejean Houle	7	1	1	2	2	Quebec Nordiques
(Canada) Paul Shmyr	7	0	2	2	4	Cleveland Crusaders
(Canada) Jim Harrison	3	0	2	2	6	Cleveland Crusaders
(Canada) Mike Walton	6	0	1	1	2	Minnesota Fighting Saints
(Canada) Al Hamilton	3	0	1	1	4	Edmonton Oilers
(Canada) Marc Tardif	5	0	1	1	10	Michigan Stags
(Canada) Rick Ley	7	0	1	1	14	New England Whalers
(Canada) Marty Howe	4	0	0	0	12	Houston Aeros
(Canada) Brad Selwood	4	0	0	0	2	New England Whalers
(Canada) Rick Smith	7	0	0	0	12	Minnesota Fighting Saints

NOTE - Tom Webster served a 2 minute bench minor penalty

=== Soviets ===
Player	GP	G	A	Pts	PIM	TEAM
(Soviet Union) Alexander Yakushev	7	6	2	8	2	HC Spartak Moscow
(Soviet Union) Valeri Kharlamov	8	2	6	8	4	CSKA Moscow
(Soviet Union) Vladimir Petrov	7	1	6	7	4	CSKA Moscow
(Soviet Union) Boris Mikhailov	7	4	2	6	0	CSKA Moscow
(Soviet Union) Vladimir Shadrin	8	0	5	5	11	HC Spartak Moscow
(Soviet Union) Alexander Maltsev	8	4	0	4	0	Dynamo Moscow
(Soviet Union) Valeri Vasiliev	8	3	1	4	7	Dynamo Moscow
(Soviet Union) Alexander Gusev	8	3	1	4	4	CSKA Moscow
(Soviet Union) Vyacheslav Anisin	8	2	2	4	0	Krylya Sovetov Moscow
(Soviet Union) Yuri Lebedev	8	1	3	4	6	Krylya Sovetov Moscow
(Soviet Union) Vladimir Vikulov	4	0	4	4	0	CSKA Moscow
(Soviet Union) Vladimir Lutchenko	8	1	2	3	4	CSKA Moscow
(Soviet Union) Viktor Shalimov	4	2	0	2	0	HC Spartak Moscow
(Soviet Union) Gennady Tsygankov	6	0	2	2	2	CSKA Moscow
(Soviet Union) Sergei Kapustin	5	0	1	1	6	Krylya Sovetov Moscow
(Soviet Union) Yuri Shatalov	4	1	0	1	0	Krylya Sovetov Moscow
(Soviet Union) Yuri Tyurin	4	1	0	1	4	Krylya Sovetov Moscow
(Soviet Union) Alexander Bodunov	7	1	0	1	4	Krylya Sovetov Moscow
(Soviet Union) Alexander Volchkov	2	0	0	0	0	CSKA Moscow
(Soviet Union) Yuri Fedorov	1	0	0	0	0	Torpedo Gorky
(Soviet Union) Konstantin Klimov	1	0	0	0	0	Krylya Sovetov Moscow
(Soviet Union) Vladimir Popov	1	0	0	0	2	CSKA Moscow
(Soviet Union) Sergei Kotov	5	0	0	0	0	Krylya Sovetov Moscow
(Soviet Union) Yuri Lyapkin	5	0	0	0	2	HC Spartak Moscow
(Soviet Union) Viktor Kuznetsov	8	0	0	0	4	Krylya Sovetov Moscow
(Soviet Union) Alexander Sapyolkin	1	0	0	0	0	SKA Leningrad
(Soviet Union) Alexander Filippov	1	0	0	0	0	Dynamo Moscow

=== Goaltenders ===
Player	G	MIN	GA	GAA	SVS%	TEAM
(Soviet Union) Vladislav Tretiak	7	420	25	3.57	.877	CSKA Moscow
(Canada) Gerry Cheevers	7	420	24	3.43	.876	Cleveland Crusaders
(Canada) Don McLeod	8	58:56	8	8.14	.794	Houston Aeros
(Soviet Union) Alexander Sidelnikov	8	60	2	2.00	.917	Krylya Sovetov Moscow
(Canada) Gilles Gratton	1	0	-	-	-	Toronto Toros
(Soviet Union) Vladimir Polupanov	1	0	-	-	-	Dynamo Moscow

Several Canadian players were selected but did not get to play: Barry Long, Pat Price, Wayne Dillon, Gavin Kirk, Dennis Sobchuk, Ron Chipperfield.
Several Soviet players were selected but did not get to play: Sergei Glukhov, Alexander Golikov, Sergei Korotkov, Alexander Kulikov, Vladimir Repnyov.

== Broadcasting ==
Like the 1972 Summit Series, CBC and CTV split the coverage, with CTV carrying games 1, 3, 6 and 7, while CBC aired games 2, 4, 5 and 8. CTV produced the telecasts. Johnny Esaw called the games for CTV and Don Chevrier called the action for CBC. Howie Meeker was the colour commentator for all games. Both Esaw and Chevrier conducted intermission and post-game interviews during the games which they did not do play-by-play. In the Soviet Union, coverage was by the Ministry of Telecommunications. The first 4 games featured the Gamerecorder, which was the first statistics computer used in professional sports. A print of the Gamerecorder is now held by the Hockey Hall of Fame.

== Legacy ==

In honour of the 45th anniversary of the Series, a gala evening was held at the Moscow Hockey Museum on October 7, 2019; the event was attended by Canadian chargé d’affaires ad interim Stéphane Jobin.

== See also ==
- 1972 Summit Series
- List of international ice hockey competitions featuring NHL players
- Canada Cup
- Super Series
- Aggie Kukulowicz, Canadian-born Russian language interpreter for the series
