= Alexander Volchkov (ice hockey, born 1952) =

Russian ice hockey player (born 1952)

Medal record

Men's ice hockey

Representing Soviet Union

World Championships
Gold medal – first place	1973 Soviet Union	

Alexander Volchkov (born January 11, 1952, in Moscow, Russia) is a retired professional ice hockey player who played in the Soviet Championship League. He played for HC CSKA Moscow. He also played for the Soviet team during the 1972 Summit Series and the 1974 Summit Series against Canada. He won a gold medal at the 1973 World Ice Hockey Championships where he played 10 games, scoring 3 goals, assisting on 3 goals and serving 2 penalty minutes.
