= Yuri Shatalov =

Russian ice hockey player (1945–2018)

Medal record

Men's ice hockey

Representing Soviet Union

World Championships
Gold medal – first place	1974 Finland	

Yuri Shatalov

Yuri Grigorievich Shatalov (Russian: Ю́рий Григо́рьевич Шата́лов; March 23, 1945 – March 19, 2018) was a Russian ice hockey player who played in the Soviet Hockey League. He played for Krylya Sovetov Moscow. He was inducted into the Russian and Soviet Hockey Hall of Fame in 1974.

He also played for the Soviet team during the 1972 Summit Series and the 1974 Summit Series against Canada. He won a gold medal at the 1974 World Ice Hockey Championships where he played 8 games, scoring 1 goal, assisting on 4 goals and serving 4 penalty minutes.
