= Alexander Gusev (ice hockey) =

Soviet ice hockey player (1947–2020)

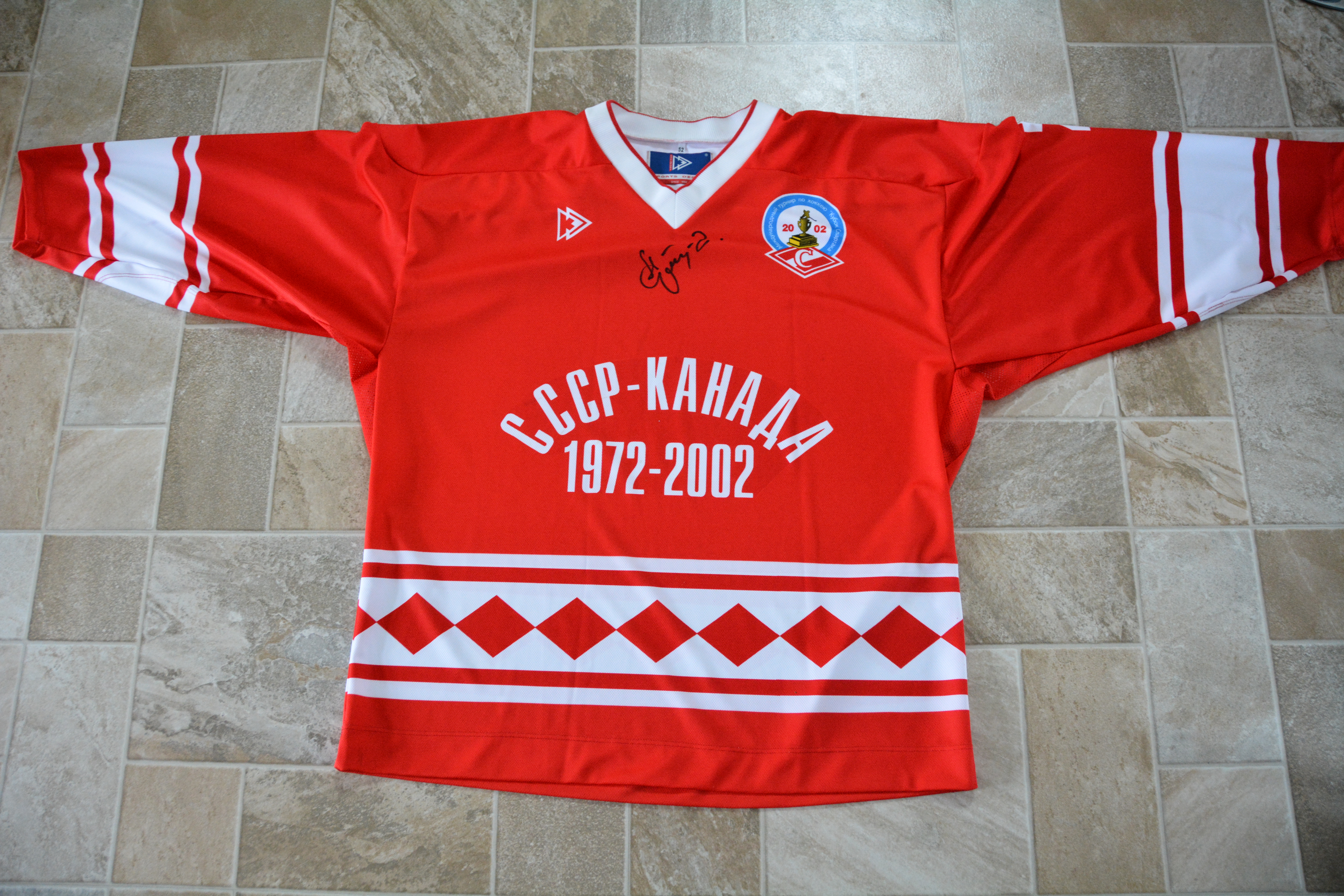
- Alexander Gusev Jersey #2
- Born: January 21, 1947 Moscow, Russian SFSR, Soviet Union
- Died: July 22, 2020 (aged 73)
- Height: 182 cm (6 ft 0 in)
- Weight: 90 kg (198 lb; 14 st 2 lb)
- Position: Defenceman
- Shot: Left
- Played for: HC CSKA Moscow; SKA Leningrad
- National team: Soviet Union
- Playing career: 1965–1979
Medal record
Men's ice hockey
Representing Soviet Union
Olympic Games
Gold medal – first place	1976 Innsbruck	Team
World Championships
Gold medal – first place	1973 Soviet Union	Team
Gold medal – first place	1974 Finland	Team
Silver medal – second place	1972 Czechoslovakia	Team
Bronze medal – third place	1977 Austria	Team

Alexander Vladimirovich Gusev (Russian: Александр Владимирович Гусев; 21 January 1947 – 22 July 2020) was a Russian Soviet ice hockey player and Olympic champion. He participated at the 1976 Winter Olympics in Innsbruck, where the Soviet team won the gold medal. He played the majority of his career with HC CSKA Moscow.

Gusev died on 22 July 2020 aged 73.
