= Gilles Gratton =

Canadian ice hockey player

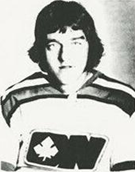
- Born: July 28, 1952 (age 74) LaSalle, Quebec, Canada
- Height: 5 ft 11 in (180 cm)
- Weight: 160 lb (73 kg; 11 st 6 lb)
- Position: Goaltender
- Caught: Left
- Played for: Ottawa Nationals; Toronto Toros; St. Louis Blues; New York Rangers
- National team: Canada
- NHL draft: 69th overall, 1972; Buffalo Sabres
- Playing career: 1972–1978

Gilles Gratton (born July 28, 1952) is a Canadian former professional ice hockey goaltender.

== Playing career ==
As a youth, Gratton played in the 1965 Quebec International Pee-Wee Hockey Tournament with a minor ice hockey team from LaSalle, Quebec.

Gratton began his junior hockey career in 1969 with the Oshawa Generals of the Ontario Hockey Association; after three years in Oshawa, Gratton was drafted in the fifth round of the 1972 NHL Amateur Draft by the Buffalo Sabres. Instead of signing with Buffalo (where his brother, Norm Gratton, would soon be playing after his acquisition from the Atlanta Flames), Gilles jumped to the new World Hockey Association, inking a deal with the Ottawa Nationals; in 1973, Gratton would move with the team to Toronto, as the franchise became the Toronto Toros. At the 1974 Summit Series Gratton was selected as Team Canada's number three goaltender, playing half games in exhibition matches against Finland and Czechoslovakia, but not seeing any ice time against the Soviet Union. (Note: Some statistics indicate he played in game 3 of the 1974 Summit Series, but this mistake is a result of the fact that there is no official statistical record, only next day newspaper reports. Actually, during the final 1:04 minutes of the game, Team Canada had a power play and pulled their goalie Don McLeod for a 6 on 4 skater advantage. So their net was empty, and Gratton did not get any ice time.)

In 1975, Gratton jumped to the St. Louis Blues of NHL, but after just six games decided he wanted to go back to Toronto and walked out on the team. However, the Blues refused to grant him his release, so he sat out the rest of the season. They relented during the summer and Gratton wound up with the New York Rangers, splitting time in goal with John Davidson. Finally, Gratton played one game with the minor-league New Haven Nighthawks in the 1977–78 AHL season before retiring.

Gratton is perhaps best known for his goalie mask, which was an adaptation of his astrological sign, Leo. However, Gratton states that he got the idea from a picture in a National Geographic magazine that he was reading on a plane flight, stating, "It's not a lion mask at all. It's a tiger." Allegedly, Gratton would live up to his "feline" image by growling at opposing players on the ice, and even hissing like a cat during a fight.

=== "Gratoony the Loony" ===
Throughout his career, Gratton, nicknamed "Gratoony the Loony", was known for his eccentric personality and outspoken character, often drawing attention away from his talent. While playing in the WHA, he once hurled insults against the opposing team's fans in San Diego ahead of a playoff game. Legend has it that Gratton once told his teammates he was reincarnated and had once been a soldier in the Spanish Inquisition. Gratton also allegedly believed that, in a previous existence, he was an executioner who had stoned people to death, and thus was "fated" to be a goalie as punishment. While with the Toros, he refused to play because the moon was in the wrong part of the sky, thereby not lined up with Jupiter. He later stated he did so to protest against the firing of coach Billy Harris.

On THN.com, he was voted to have the sixth-scariest goalie mask.

=== Post playing days ===
In October 2015, ECW Press announced that it would be publishing Gratton's autobiography, Grattoony the Loony, written with author Greg Oliver.

== Career statistics ==
=== Regular season and playoffs ===
			Regular season									Playoffs
Season	Team	League	GP	W	L	T	MIN	GA	SO	GAA	SV%	GP	W	L	T	MIN	GA	SO	GAA	SV%
1969–70	Oshawa Generals	OHA-Jr.	26	—	—	—	1550	129	0	4.99	—	—	—	—	—	—	—	—	—	—
1970–71	Oshawa Generals	OHA-Jr.	47	—	—	—	2808	234	0	5.00	—	—	—	—	—	—	—	—	—	—
1971–72	Oshawa Generals	OHA-Jr.	50	—	—	—	3000	178	3	3.56	—	10	5	4	1	600	31	0	3.10	—
1972–73	Ottawa Nationals	WHA	51	25	22	3	3021	187	0	3.71	.882	2	0	1	—	86	7	0	4.88	.904
1973–74	Toronto Toros	WHA	57	26	24	3	3200	188	2	3.53	.895	10	5	3	—	539	25	1	2.78	.913
1974–75	Toronto Toros	WHA	53	30	20	1	2881	185	2	3.85	.887	1	0	1	—	36	5	0	8.33	—
1975–76	St. Louis Blues	NHL	6	2	0	2	265	11	0	2.49	.921	—	—	—	—	—	—	—	—	—
1976–77	New York Rangers	NHL	41	11	18	7	2034	143	0	4.22	.858	—	—	—	—	—	—	—	—	—
1977–78	New Haven Nighthawks	AHL	1	0	1	0	60	6	0	6.00	.760	—	—	—	—	—	—	—	—	—
WHA totals			161	81	66	7	9102	560	4	3.69	.888	13	5	5	—	661	37	1	3.36	—
NHL totals			47	13	18	9	2299	154	0	4.02	.866	—	—	—	—	—	—	—	—	—

=== International ===
Year	Team	Event	GP	W	L	T	MIN	GA	SO	GAA
1974	Canada	SS	0	0	0	0	0	0	0	-
