= Vladimir Petrov (ice hockey) =

Russian ice hockey player (1947–2017)

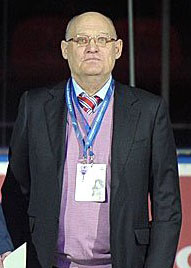
- Vladimir Petrov in February 2013
- Born: 30 June 1947 Krasnogorsk, Russian SFSR, Soviet Union
- Died: 28 February 2017 (aged 69) Moscow, Russia
- Height: 6 ft 0 in (183 cm)
- Weight: 196 lb (89 kg; 14 st 0 lb)
- Position: Centre
- Shot: Right
- Played for: Krylya Sovetov; CSKA Moscow; SKA Leningrad
- National team: Soviet Union
- Playing career: 1965–1983
Medal record
Men's ice hockey
Representing Soviet Union
Olympic Games
Gold medal – first place	1972 Sapporo	Team
Gold medal – first place	1976 Innsbruck	Team
Silver medal – second place	1980 Lake Placid	Team
World Championships
Gold medal – first place	1969 Sweden
Gold medal – first place	1970 Sweden
Gold medal – first place	1971 Switzerland
Silver medal – second place	1972 Czechoslovakia
Gold medal – first place	1973 Soviet Union
Gold medal – first place	1974 Finland
Gold medal – first place	1975 West Germany
Bronze medal – third place	1977 Austria
Gold medal – first place	1978 Czechoslovakia
Gold medal – first place	1979 Soviet Union
Gold medal – first place	1981 Sweden

Vladimir Vladimirovich Petrov (Russian: Влади́мир Влади́мирович Петро́в; 30 June 1947 – 28 February 2017) was a Russian ice hockey player, Olympic gold (1972, 1976) and silver medalist (1980).

Born in Krasnogorsk, Petrov played in the Soviet Ice Hockey League for Krylya Sovetov, Moscow (from 1965 to 1967), CSKA Moscow (from 1967 to 1981) and SKA, Leningrad (from 1981 to 1983). At CSKA Moscow and the Soviet national team, he, together with Boris Mikhailov and Valeri Kharlamov, formed one of the best offensive lines ever.

Petrov played for the Soviet team in three Winter Olympics, 1972 Soviet Union–Canada Summit Series and many IIHF World Championships. He is the fourth all-time leading top scorer at the World Championships, with 154 points (74 goals and 80 assists) in 102 games. He also scored 7 points (3 goals and 4 assists) in 8 games at the Summit Series. Petrov retired from ice hockey in 1983.

In the mid-1990s, Petrov was the president of Russian Ice Hockey Federation. In 2006, he was enshrined into the IIHF Hall of Fame.

Petrov died in 2017 and was buried in the Federal Military Memorial Cemetery in Moscow Oblast.

== Awards ==
- 1973, 1975, 1977, 1979 – World Championships All-Star
- 1973, 1975, 1977, 1979 – World Championships leading scorer
- 1972, 1973 – Soviet League Player of the Year
- 1973, 1975, 1977, 1979 – Soviet League All-Star
- 1970, 1973, 1975, 1978, 1979 – Soviet League leading scorer
- Order For Merit to the Fatherland 4th class
- Order For Merit to the Fatherland 3rd class
- Order of Friendship
- Two Orders of the Badge of Honour
- Two Medals "For Labour Valour"

== Career statistics ==
=== Regular season ===
			Regular season
Season	Team	League	GP	G	A	Pts	PIM
1965–66	Krylya Sovetov Moscow	Soviet	23	1	8	9	—
1966–67	Krylya Sovetov Moscow	Soviet	44	15	9	24	—
1967–68	CSKA Moscow	Soviet	38	21	19	40	—
1968–69	CSKA Moscow	Soviet	39	27	18	45	—
1969–70	CSKA Moscow	Soviet	43	51	21	72	—
1970–71	CSKA Moscow	Soviet	37	16	16	32	—
1971–72	CSKA Moscow	Soviet	32	21	16	37	—
1972–73	CSKA Moscow	Soviet	30	27	22	49	—
1973–74	CSKA Moscow	Soviet	28	14	14	28	34
1974–75	CSKA Moscow	Soviet	34	27	26	53	58
1975–76	CSKA Moscow	Soviet	34	22	22	44	46
1976–77	CSKA Moscow	Soviet	35	26	36	62	57
1977–78	CSKA Moscow	Soviet	31	28	28	56	41
1978–79	CSKA Moscow	Soviet	43	26	37	63	54
1979–80	CSKA Moscow	Soviet	32	21	20	41	28
1980–81	CSKA Moscow	Soviet	40	19	24	43	42
1981–82	SKA Leningrad	Soviet	20	4	3	7	24
1982–83	SKA Leningrad	Soviet	12	4	4	8	18
Soviet totals			595	370	343	713	402

=== International ===
Year	Team	Event	GP	G	A	Pts	PIM
1969	Soviet Union	WC	10	6	2	8	16
1970	Soviet Union	WC	10	5	3	8	8
1971	Soviet Union	WC	9	8	3	11	2
1972	Soviet Union	OLY	4	0	2	2	0
1972	Soviet Union	WC	10	6	6	12	6
1972	Soviet Union	SS	8	3	4	7	10
1973	Soviet Union	WC	10	18	16	34	12
1974	Soviet Union	WC	8	4	7	11	0
1974	Soviet Union	SS	7	1	6	7	4
1975	Soviet Union	WC	10	6	12	18	2
1976	Soviet Union	OLY	6	6	3	9	6
1977	Soviet Union	WC	10	7	14	21	8
1978	Soviet Union	WC	8	3	1	4	4
1979	Soviet Union	WC	8	7	8	15	10
1980	Soviet Union	OLY	7	4	2	6	6
1981	Soviet Union	WC	8	4	6	10	6
World Championship & Olympic totals			118	84	85	169	86

Awards and achievements
Preceded by Alexander Yakushev	Soviet Scoring Champion; 1970	Succeeded by Alexander Maltsev
Preceded by Valeri Kharlamov	Soviet Scoring Champion; 1973	Succeeded by Vyacheslav Anisin
Preceded by Vyacheslav Anisin	Soviet Scoring Champion; 1975	Succeeded by Victor Shalimov
Preceded by Helmuts Balderis	Soviet Scoring Champion; 1978, 1979	Succeeded by Sergei Makarov
