= Sergei Kapustin =

Soviet ice hockey player

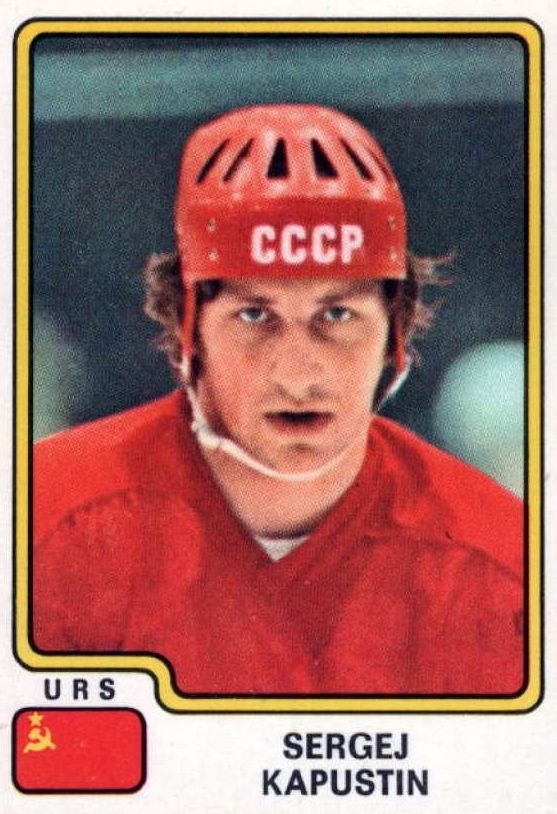
- Kapustin in 1979
- Born: 13 February 1953 Ukhta, Russian SFSR, Soviet Union
- Died: 4 June 1995 (aged 42)
- Height: 5 ft 11 in (180 cm)
- Weight: 191 lb (87 kg; 13 st 9 lb)
- Position: Left wing
- Shot: Left
- Played for: Krylya Sovetov; HC CSKA Moscow; HC Spartak Moscow; Innsbrucker EV; EC Salzburg
- National team: Soviet Union
- NHL draft: 141st overall, 1982; New York Rangers
- Playing career: 1971–1988
Medal record
Men's ice hockey
Representing the Soviet Union
Winter Olympics
Gold medal – first place	1976 Innsbruck
World Championships
Gold medal – first place	1974 Finland
Gold medal – first place	1975 West Germany
Gold medal – first place	1978 Czechoslovakia
Gold medal – first place	1979 Soviet Union
Gold medal – first place	1981 Sweden
Gold medal – first place	1982 Finland
Gold medal – first place	1983 West Germany
Silver medal – second place	1976 Poland
Bronze medal – third place	1977 Austria
Canada Cup
Gold medal – first place	1981 Canada

Sergei Alekseevich Kapustin (Russian: Сергей Алексеевич Капустин) (13 February 1953 – 4 June 1995) was a Soviet ice hockey player who played in the Soviet Hockey League. He played for HC CSKA Moscow, Krylya Sovetov Moscow, and HC Spartak Moscow.

Kapustin played 13 seasons with the Soviet Union national team. He was part of the team that won seven gold medals at the World Championships in 1974, 1975, 1978, 1979, 1981, 1982, 1983. Kapustin was voted to the first All-Star team at the 1978 and 1981 tournaments. He played for the Soviet Union in the 1974 Summit Series, the 1976 Canada Cup, the gold medal team at the 1976 Winter Olympics, the 1979 Challenge Cup, and the 1981 Canada Cup. He was voted "best forward" at the 1978 Izvestia Cup.

Kapustin was selected by the New York Rangers of the National Hockey League (NHL) in the 1982 NHL entry draft, as they believed it possible he might go to North America.

Kapustin was inducted into the Russian and Soviet Hockey Hall of Fame in 1975. He retired in December 1985 after that year's Izvestia Cup tournament, although he continued his career in Austrian clubs Innsbrucker EV and EC Salzburg, respectively. After the collapse of the latter, Kapustin retired. He died of sepsis in 1995 at age 42 after swimming in a Moscow pond, having cut his elbow on a rusty nail.

His younger brother Igor (1957—2023) was also a prominent ice hockey player.
