= Alexander Maltsev =

Russian ice hockey player (born 1949)

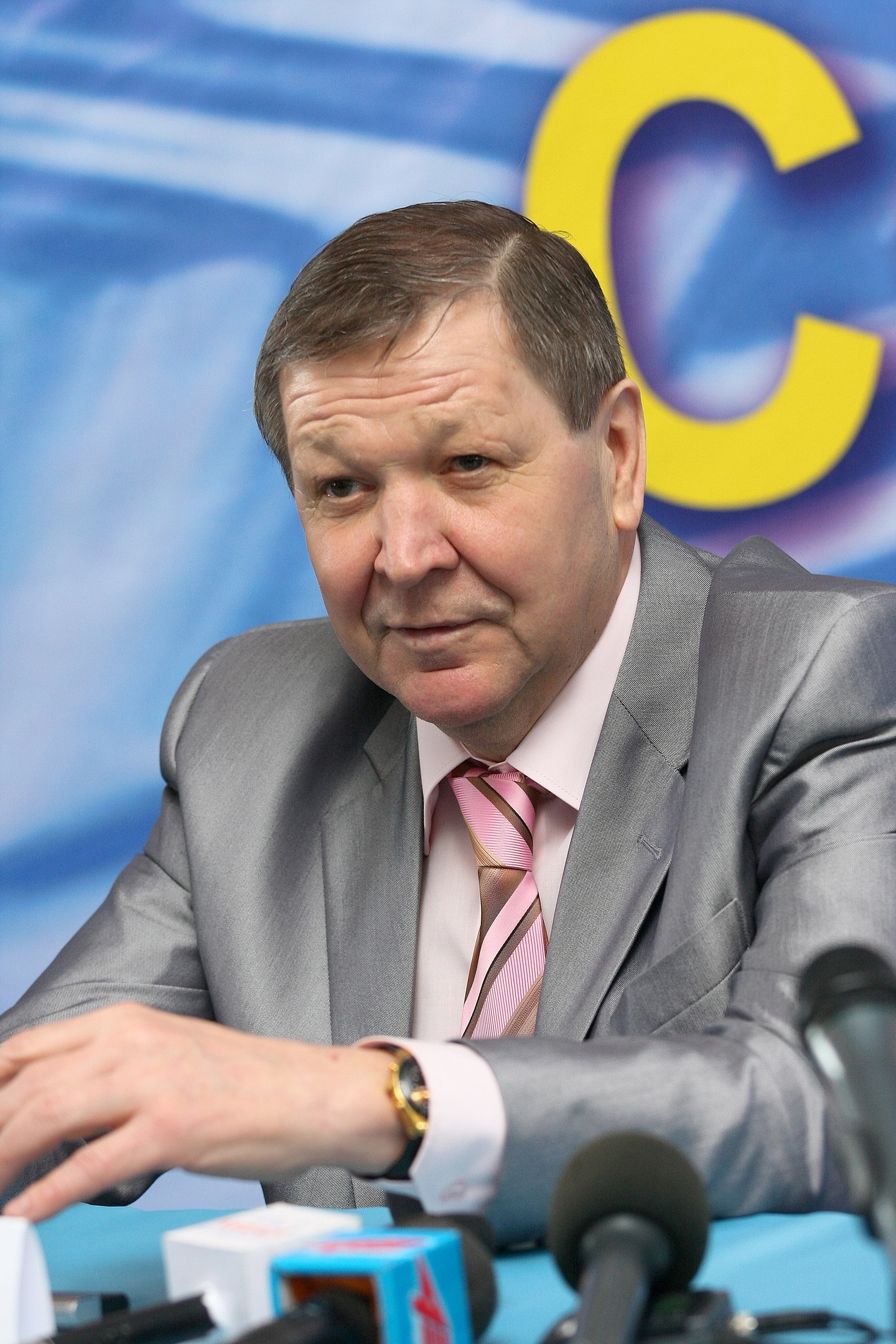
- Maltsev in 2019
- Born: 20 April 1949 (age 77) Kirovo-Chepetsk, Kirov Oblast, Russian SFSR, Soviet Union
- Height: 5 ft 9 in (175 cm)
- Weight: 170 lb (77 kg; 12 st 2 lb)
- Position: Centre/Right Wing
- Shot: Left
- Played for: Olimpiya Kirovo-Chepetsk; Dynamo Moscow; Újpesti TE
- National team: Soviet Union
- Playing career: 1966–1984; 1989–1990
Medal record
Men's ice hockey
Representing Soviet Union
Olympic Games
Gold medal – first place	1972 Sapporo	Team
Gold medal – first place	1976 Innsbruck	Team
Silver medal – second place	1980 Lake Placid	Team
World Championships
Gold medal – first place	1969 Sweden
Gold medal – first place	1970 Sweden
Gold medal – first place	1971 Switzerland
Silver medal – second place	1972 Czechoslovakia
Gold medal – first place	1973 Soviet Union
Gold medal – first place	1974 Finland
Gold medal – first place	1975 West Germany
Silver medal – second place	1976 Poland
Bronze medal – third place	1977 Austria
Gold medal – first place	1978 Czechoslovakia
Gold medal – first place	1981 Sweden
Gold medal – first place	1983 West Germany
Canada Cup
Gold medal – first place	1981 Canada

Alexander Nikolayevich Maltsev (Russian: Александр Николаевич Мальцев; born 20 April 1949) is a Russian former professional ice hockey forward and politician.

Maltsev began his sports career at the Olimpiya Kirovo-Chepetsk of his hometown of Kirovo-Chepetsk (1966-1967, first coach N. I. Poles). He then played for Dynamo Moscow in the Soviet League for 530 games from 1967 to 1984. He was one of the few Soviet stars not to play for CSKA Moscow. A six-time Soviet all-star, he led the league in scoring in 1970–71 and tied with Valeri Kharlamov for MVP in 1971–72.

Maltsev was on the USSR team during the 1972 Winter Olympics, 1976 Winter Olympics and 1980 Winter Olympics, winning gold in 1972 and 1976, and silver in 1980. He was named the best forward at the IIHF World Championships three times, leading the tournament in goals once and total scoring twice. He made the world championship all-star team on five occasions. Maltsev's 213 career goals in international play were the most by any Soviet player. He was inducted into the IIHF Hall of Fame in 1999.

Maltsev was awarded two Medals "For Labour Valour" in 1969 and 1972, the Order of the Badge of Honour in 1976 and the Order of the Red Banner of Labour in 1978.

== Career statistics ==
=== Regular season ===
			Regular season
Season	Team	League	GP	G	A	Pts	PIM
1967–68	Dynamo Moscow	Soviet	23	9	2	11	4
1968–69	Dynamo Moscow	Soviet	42	26	—	—	—
1969–70	Dynamo Moscow	Soviet	42	32	—	—	—
1970–71	Dynamo Moscow	Soviet	37	30	26	56	8
1971–72	Dynamo Moscow	Soviet	26	20	11	31	14
1972–73	Dynamo Moscow	Soviet	27	20	16	36	30
1973–74	Dynamo Moscow	Soviet	32	25	22	47	14
1974–75	Dynamo Moscow	Soviet	32	18	16	34	28
1975–76	Dynamo Moscow	Soviet	29	28	19	47	0
1976–77	Dynamo Moscow	Soviet	33	31	27	58	4
1977–78	Dynamo Moscow	Soviet	24	17	12	29	22
1978–79	Dynamo Moscow	Soviet	8	2	3	5	0
1979–80	Dynamo Moscow	Soviet	36	11	28	39	10
1980–81	Dynamo Moscow	Soviet	38	14	28	42	8
1981–82	Dynamo Moscow	Soviet	37	19	22	41	6
1982–83	Dynamo Moscow	Soviet	32	14	15	29	0
1983–84	Dynamo Moscow	Soviet	32	7	15	22	6
1989–90	Újpesti Dózsa SC	HUN	13	8	12	20	—
Soviet totals			446	329	271	585	154

- Soviet totals do not include numbers from the 1968–69 to 1969–70 seasons.

=== International ===
Year	Team	Event	GP	G	A	Pts	PIM
1968	Soviet Union	EJC	5	2	6	8	0
1969	Soviet Union	EJC	5	13	4	17	2
1969	Soviet Union	WC	10	5	6	11	0
1970	Soviet Union	WC	10	15	6	21	8
1971	Soviet Union	WC	10	10	6	16	2
1972	Soviet Union	OLY	5	4	3	7	0
1972	Soviet Union	WC	10	10	12	22	0
1972	Soviet Union	SS	8	0	5	5	0
1973	Soviet Union	WC	9	7	6	13	12
1974	Soviet Union	WC	10	6	4	10	2
1974	Soviet Union	SS	8	4	0	4	0
1975	Soviet Union	WC	10	8	6	14	2
1976	Soviet Union	OLY	6	7	7	14	0
1976	Soviet Union	WC	5	3	3	6	0
1976	Soviet Union	CC	5	3	4	7	2
1977	Soviet Union	WC	8	1	9	10	2
1978	Soviet Union	WC	10	5	8	13	0
1980	Soviet Union	OLY	7	6	4	10	0
1981	Soviet Union	WC	8	6	7	13	2
1981	Soviet Union	CC	4	1	1	2	0
1983	Soviet Union	WC	8	1	3	4	0
Junior totals			10	15	10	25	2
Senior totals			151	102	100	202	32

== Politics ==
In 2016, he ran for the State Duma election from A Just Russia party, coming in second in his constituency to a United Russia candidate.

Awards
Preceded by Anatoli Firsov	Soviet MVP; 1972	Succeeded by Valeri Kharlamov
Preceded by Vladimir Petrov	Soviet Scoring Champion; 1971	Succeeded by Valeri Kharlamov
