= Viktor Shalimov =

Russian ice hockey player

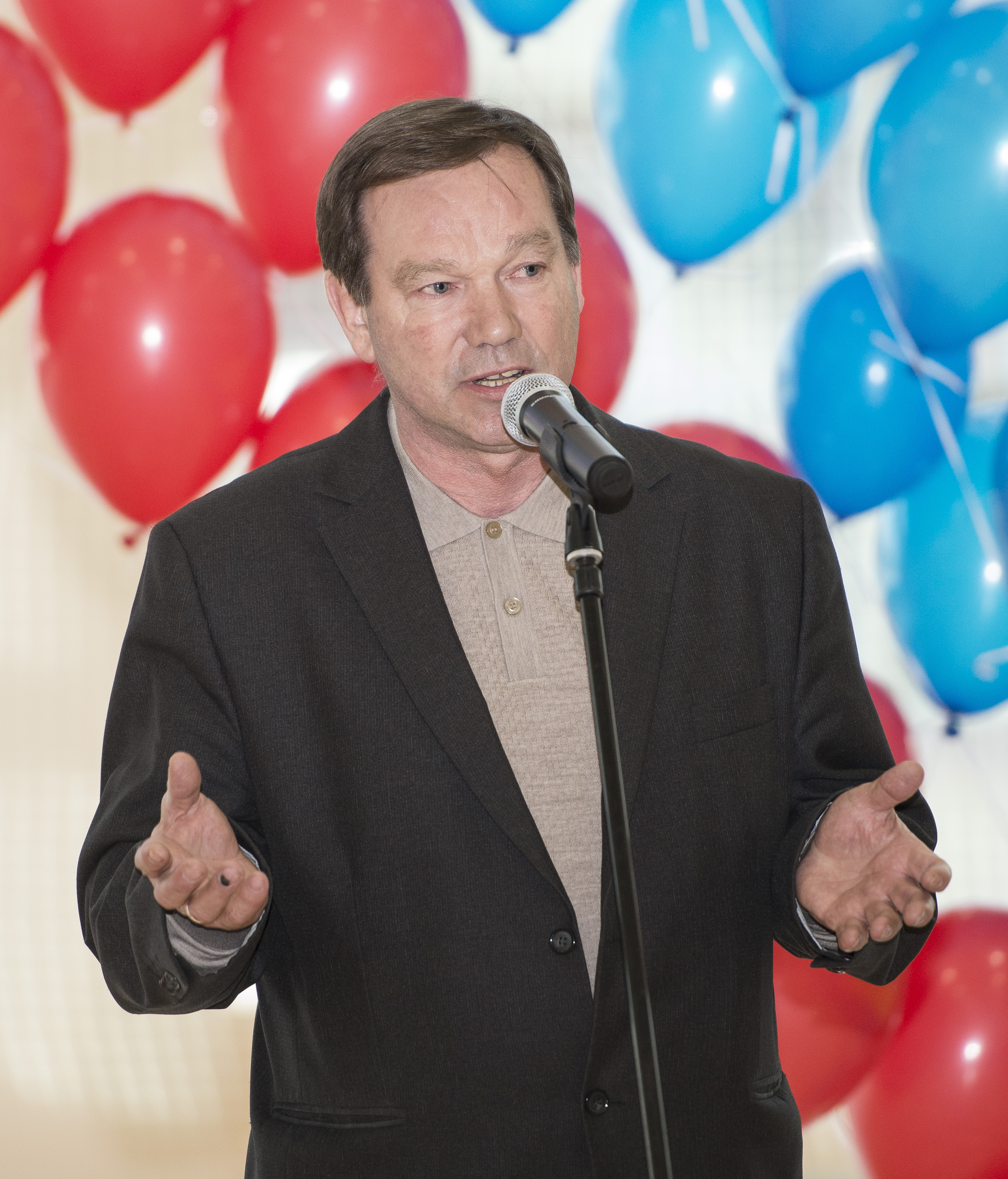
- Born: April 20, 1951 (age 75) Solnechnogorsk, Soviet Union
- Height: 5 ft 11 in (180 cm)
- Weight: 170 lb (77 kg; 12 st 2 lb)
- Position: Right wing
- Shot: Left
- Played for: Spartak Moscow; Innsbrucker EV; EC Salzburg
- National team: Soviet Union
- Playing career: 1969–1988
Medal record
Men's ice hockey
Representing Soviet Union
Olympic Games
Gold medal – first place	1976 Innsbruck	Team
World Championships
Gold medal – first place	1975 West Germany
Silver medal – second place	1976 Poland
Bronze medal – third place	1977 Austria
Gold medal – first place	1981 Sweden
Gold medal – first place	1983 Finland

Viktor Ivanovich Shalimov (Russian: Виктор Иванович Шалимов; born April 20, 1951, in Solnechnogorsk, Soviet Union) is a retired ice hockey player who played in the Soviet Hockey League. He played for HC Spartak Moscow. He was inducted into the Russian and Soviet Hockey Hall of Fame in 1975. He scored 66 goals in his 126 career games for the Soviet national team. He played in the 1976 Winter Olympics and was one of the top scorers of the tournament. He spent final seasons of his career in Austria, making him one of the first Soviet ice-hockey players to get to play abroad.

Awards
Preceded by Vladimir Petrov	Soviet Scoring Champion; 1976	Succeeded by Helmuts Balderis
