= Bruce MacGregor =

Canadian ice hockey player

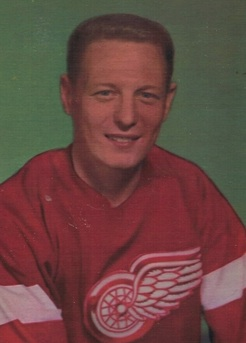
- Born: April 26, 1941 (age 85) Edmonton, Alberta, Canada
- Height: 5 ft 10 in (178 cm)
- Weight: 180 lb (82 kg; 12 st 12 lb)
- Position: Centre
- Shot: Right
- Played for: Detroit Red Wings; New York Rangers; Edmonton Oilers (WHA)
- National team: Canada
- Playing career: 1961–1976

Bruce MacGregor (born April 26, 1941) is a Canadian former professional ice hockey forward who played for the Detroit Red Wings and New York Rangers of the National Hockey League (NHL), and the Edmonton Oilers of the World Hockey Association (WHA). During his NHL career, MacGregor scored 213 goals and 257 assists in 893 games. He won 5 Stanley Cups with the Edmonton Oilers as the assistant general manager in 1984, 1985, 1987, 1988, 1990.

== Awards and achievements ==
- 1983–84 - NHL - Stanley Cup (Edmonton)
- 1984–85 - NHL - Stanley Cup (Edmonton)
- 1986–87 - NHL - Stanley Cup (Edmonton)
- 1987–88 - NHL - Stanley Cup (Edmonton)
- 1989–90 - NHL - Stanley Cup (Edmonton)
- Inducted Alberta Sports Hall of Fame 2015

== Career statistics ==
=== Regular season and playoffs ===
			Regular season					Playoffs
Season	Team	League	GP	G	A	Pts	PIM	GP	G	A	Pts	PIM
1958–59	Edmonton Oil Kings	WCHL	37	33	39	72	22	—	—	—	—	—
1958–59	Edmonton Oil Kings	MC	—	—	—	—	—	4	1	4	5	6
1959–60	Edmonton Oil Kings	WCHL	24	24	18	42	15	—	—	—	—	—
1959–60	Edmonton Oil Kings	MC	—	—	—	—	—	22	22	17	39	33
1960–61	Edmonton Flyers	WHL	54	20	26	46	33	—	—	—	—	—
1960–61	Detroit Red Wings	NHL	12	0	1	1	0	8	1	2	3	6
1961–62	Detroit Red Wings	NHL	65	6	12	18	16	—	—	—	—	—
1962–63	Detroit Red Wings	NHL	67	11	11	22	12	10	1	4	5	10
1963–64	Detroit Red Wings	NHL	63	11	21	32	15	14	5	2	7	12
1964–65	Detroit Red Wings	NHL	66	21	20	41	19	7	0	2	2	2
1965–66	Detroit Red Wings	NHL	70	20	14	34	28	12	1	4	5	2
1966–67	Detroit Red Wings	NHL	70	28	19	47	14	—	—	—	—	—
1967–68	Detroit Red Wings	NHL	71	15	24	39	13	—	—	—	—	—
1968–69	Detroit Red Wings	NHL	69	18	23	41	14	—	—	—	—	—
1969–70	Detroit Red Wings	NHL	73	15	23	38	24	4	1	0	1	2
1970–71	Detroit Red Wings	NHL	47	6	16	22	18	—	—	—	—	—
1970–71	New York Rangers	NHL	27	12	13	25	4	13	0	4	4	2
1972–73	New York Rangers	NHL	52	14	12	26	12	10	2	2	4	2
1973–74	New York Rangers	NHL	66	17	27	44	6	13	6	2	8	2
1974–75	Edmonton Oilers	WHA	72	24	28	52	10	—	—	—	—	—
1975–76	Edmonton Oilers	WHA	63	13	10	23	13	4	0	1	1	0
WHA totals			135	37	38	75	23	4	0	1	1	0
NHL totals			893	213	257	470	217	107	19	28	47	44

=== International ===
Year	Team	Event	GP	G	A	Pts	PIM
1974	Canada	SS	5	0	1	1	5
