= Yegor Mikhailov =

Russian ice hockey player

- Born: 23 July 1978 (age 47) Moscow, Soviet Union
- Height: 5 ft 8 in (173 cm)
- Weight: 161 lb (73 kg; 11 st 7 lb)
- Position: Right wing
- Shot: Left
- Played for: SKA Saint Petersburg; Spokane Chiefs; HC CSKA Moscow; Metallurg Magnitogorsk; HC Dynamo Moscow; HC Spartak Moscow
- Playing career: 1994–2015

Yegor Borisovich Mikhailov (sometimes Egor, Igor) (Russian: Eгор Борисович Михайлов; born 23 July 1978 in Moscow) is a Russian professional ice hockey winger currently playing for HC Spartak Moscow of the Kontinental Hockey League.

Mikhailov played the 1996–97 season in North America with the Spokane Chiefs of the Western Hockey League.

== Career statistics ==
			Regular season					Playoffs
Season	Team	League	GP	G	A	Pts	PIM	GP	G	A	Pts	PIM
1994–95	SKA Saint Petersburg	Russia	32	1	1	2	8	—	—	—	—	—
1994–95	SKA Saint Petersburg-2	Russia2	2	0	0	0	4	—	—	—	—	—
1995–96	SKA Saint Petersburg	Russia	46	8	3	11	14	2	0	0	0	0
1996–97	Spokane Chiefs	WHL	45	10	10	20	34	—	—	—	—	—
1997–98	SKA Saint Petersburg	Russia	42	14	11	25	34	2	0	0	0	2
1997–98	SKA Saint Petersburg-2	Russia3	1	0	0	0	2	—	—	—	—	—
1998–99	HC CSKA Moscow	Russia	42	7	9	16	34	3	0	0	0	4
1999–00	HC CSKA Moscow	Russia	37	1	5	6	20	2	0	1	1	0
1999–00	HC CSKA Moscow-2	Russia3	2	0	4	4	0	—	—	—	—	—
2000–01	HC CSKA Moscow	Russia	41	4	7	11	14	—	—	—	—	—
2001–02	Metallurg Magnitogorsk	Russia	47	9	6	15	28	8	1	2	3	2
2002–03	Metallurg Magnitogorsk	Russia	18	1	4	5	22	1	0	0	0	0
2002–03	Metallurg Magnitogorsk-2	Russia3	4	3	0	3	4	—	—	—	—	—
2003–04	SKA Saint Petersburg	Russia	60	9	22	31	30	—	—	—	—	—
2004–05	SKA Saint Petersburg	Russia	57	13	16	29	34	—	—	—	—	—
2005–06	HC Dynamo Moscow	Russia	30	3	6	9	30	4	1	0	1	4
2006–07	HC Dynamo Moscow	Russia	15	3	0	3	12	—	—	—	—	—
2006–07	HC CSKA Moscow	Russia	32	5	3	8	20	12	0	1	1	2
2007–08	Metallurg Novokuznetsk	Russia	57	17	22	39	73	—	—	—	—	—
2008–09	Metallurg Novokuznetsk	KHL	48	10	15	25	45	—	—	—	—	—
2009–10	HC CSKA Moscow	KHL	52	8	6	14	51	3	0	0	0	4
2010–11	HC CSKA Moscow	KHL	33	6	9	15	22	—	—	—	—	—
2010–11	HC Spartak Moscow	KHL	16	4	0	4	2	4	0	0	0	0
2011–12	HC Spartak Moscow	KHL	35	7	7	14	16	—	—	—	—	—
2012–13	HC Spartak Moscow	KHL	32	3	4	7	8	—	—	—	—	—
2013–14	Red Ice HC	NLB	45	23	20	43	44	4	0	1	1	2
2014–15	EHC Visp	NLB	37	5	18	23	24	4	1	0	1	2
Russia totals			556	95	115	210	373	34	2	4	6	14
KHL totals			216	38	41	79	144	7	0	0	0	4
