= Boris Kulagin =

Russian ice hockey player, coach (1924–1988)

- Boris Kulagin

Personal information
- Birth name: Boris Pavlovich Kulagin
- Born: December 31, 1924; Barnaul, RSFSR, Soviet Union
- Died: January 25, 1988 (aged 63); Moscow, Soviet Union

Sport
- Sport: Bandy; Ice hockey

Boris Pavlovich Kulagin (Russian: Борис Павлович Кулагин; December 31, 1924 – January 25, 1988) was a Soviet and Russian ice hockey player and coach. Kulagin was one of the first players in the Soviet Union to play organized ice hockey in the 1940s. Prior to this time Kulagin played bandy or "Russian hockey". Kulagin would later coach teams in the Soviet Union, eventually becoming national team coach in the 1970s.

Kulagin was born in Barnaul in the Siberia district of the Soviet Union. In 1930, along with his family, Kulagin moved to Moscow, where his father was stationed in the military. In 1936, Kulagin was enrolled in hockey lessons, joining the hockey (bandy) division of the Moscow Dynamo sports society. Kulagin continued to play ball hockey until the 1940s, when the Soviet Union Central Committee ordered the conversion of organized play into ice hockey, then considered "Canadian hockey". Kulagin disliked the transition from bandy but was bound to the change to remain in the profession. After a few seasons of Soviet ice hockey playing Canadian rules, Kulagin suffered a career-ending leg injury and transitioned into coaching. During the 1950s, Kulagin ran sports programs in Orenburg.

Kulagin was transferred to Moscow in the 1960s and Kulagin became assistant coach to Anatoly Tarasov at HC CSKA Moscow, the Central Red Army team. Tarasov was also the national team coach, and Kulagin became assistant on the national team. After Tarasov was removed from the national team head coach position, Kulagin was retained as assistant coach to head coach Vsevolod Bobrov. Kulagin was assistant coach on the first "super series" between the Soviet national team and the NHL-based Team Canada in 1972, the "Summit Series". During the season, Kulagin was head coach of the Soviet Wings. After his team won the Soviet league championship in 1974, Kulagin was promoted to national team coach to replace Bobrov.

Kulagin would be Soviet head coach in the second super series, the "1974 Summit Series" against a WHA-based Team Canada. Unlike 1972, the Soviets won the series and it would be the start of a decade of supremacy of ice hockey by the Soviet national team. Kulagin remained national team coach until the final period of the 1977 Ice Hockey World Championships. With Sweden in the lead 2–1 after two periods of play, and the Soviet Union needing a win to take the championship, Kulagin was replaced as head coach by assistant coach Konstantin Loktev by the head of the Soviet delegation. Kulagin went on to coach Rødovre Mighty Bulls in Denmark for 2 seasons, winning the Danish Championship in his first season. Kulagin returned to the Soviet Union in 1980 and coached Moscow Spartak until his death in 1988.

== Awards and honours ==
- Merited Coach of the USSR (1969)
- Order of the Red Banner of Labour (1975)
- Order of the Badge of Honour (1981)
- Elected to the Hall of Fame of Russian hockey (2004)
