= 1978 Ice Hockey World Championships =

1978 edition of the World Ice Hockey Championships

Tournament details
- Host country: Czechoslovakia
- Venue: 1 (in 1 host city)
- Dates: 26 April – 14 May
- Teams: 8

Final positions
- Champions: Soviet Union (15th title)
- Runners-up: Czechoslovakia
- Third place: Canada
- Fourth place: Sweden

Tournament statistics
- Games played: 40
- Goals scored: 322 (8.05 per game)
- Attendance: 362,642 (9,066 per game)
- Scoring leader: (West Germany) Erich Kühnhackl 16 points

The 1978 Ice Hockey World Championships took place in Prague, Czechoslovakia from 26 April to 14 May. Held at the Sportovní hala ČSTV in the capital city, it was the sixth time Czechoslovakia hosted the competition. Eight teams took part, with each team playing each other once in the first round, and then the four best teams meeting in a new round. This was the 45th World Championships, and also the 56th European Championships. The USSR won for the 15th time, narrowly defeating the incumbent Czechoslovaks.

On the final day, there was essentially a gold medal game, and a bronze medal game. The Soviets played the Czechoslovaks and needed to win by at least two to win the Championship. They took a three nothing lead, and hung to win by two, capturing gold by being even head-to-head with the Czechoslovaks, but having a cumulative two goal advantage against everyone else. Canada and Sweden came into the final game even, so the winner would claim the bronze. Pat Hickey scored with a minute left in the game to give Canada a three to two victory, and the medal.

Because of the allowance of professionals from the NHL into the tournament, a peculiar (and new) situation arose during this year's tournament. The Minnesota North Stars had players representing Canada (2), Sweden (3), and the United States (4).

== World Championship Group A (Czechoslovakia) ==
=== First round ===
Pos	Team	Pld	W	D	L	GF	GA	GD	Pts
1	Czechoslovakia	7	7	0	0	44	15	+29	14
2	Soviet Union	7	6	0	1	46	23	+23	12
3	Canada	7	4	0	3	32	26	+6	8
4	Sweden	7	4	0	3	35	21	+14	8
5	West Germany	7	2	1	4	23	35	−12	5
6	United States	7	1	1	5	25	42	−17	3
7	East Germany	7	1	1	5	13	45	−32	3
8	Finland	7	1	1	5	23	34	−11	3

26 April	Sweden	6–2	West Germany

26 April	Czechoslovakia	8–0	East Germany

26 April	Soviet Union	9–5	United States

27 April	Finland	6–4	Canada

27 April	Soviet Union	7–4	West Germany

27 April	Sweden	5–1	United States

28 April	Czechoslovakia	6–4	Finland

28 April	Canada	6–2	East Germany

29 April	Sweden	10–1	East Germany

29 April	Czechoslovakia	8–2	West Germany

30 April	Canada	7–2	United States

30 April	Soviet Union	6–3	Finland

1 May	Canada	6–2	West Germany

1 May	Soviet Union	10–2	East Germany

2 May	Czechoslovakia	8–3	United States

2 May	Sweden	6–1	Finland

3 May	West Germany	7–4	United States

3 May	East Germany	4–3	Finland

4 May	Czechoslovakia	5–0	Canada

4 May	Soviet Union	6–1	Sweden

5 May	West Germany	5–3	Finland

5 May	United States	7–3	East Germany

6 May	Czechoslovakia	6–4	Soviet Union

6 May	Canada	7–5	Sweden

7 May	East Germany	1–1	West Germany

7 May	Finland	3–3	United States

8 May	Czechoslovakia	3–2	Sweden

8 May	Soviet Union	4–2	Canada

=== Final Round 1–4 place ===
Pos	Team	Pld	W	D	L	GF	GA	GD	Pts
1	Soviet Union	10	9	0	1	61	26	+35	18
2	Czechoslovakia	10	9	0	1	54	21	+33	18
3	Canada	10	5	0	5	38	36	+2	10
4	Sweden	10	4	0	6	39	37	+2	8

10 May	Soviet Union	5–1	Canada

10 May	Czechoslovakia	6–1	Sweden

12 May	Czechoslovakia	3–2	Canada

12 May	Soviet Union	7–1	Sweden

14 May	Canada	3–2 (1–1, 1–1, 1–0)	Sweden	Sportovní hala ČSTV, Prague; Attendance: 14,500

14 May	Soviet Union	3–1 (1–0, 1–0, 1–1)	Czechoslovakia	Sportovní hala ČSTV, Prague; Attendance: 14,500

Vladislav Tretiak
Goalies
Jiří Holeček

Helmuts Balderis	1–0
Vladimir Petrov	2–0
Vladimir Golikov	3–0
	3–1	Ivan Hlinka

=== Consolation round 5–8 place ===
Pos	Team	Pld	W	D	L	GF	GA	GD	Pts
5	West Germany	10	3	3	4	35	43	−8	9
6	United States	10	2	2	6	38	58	−20	6
7	Finland	10	2	2	6	37	44	−7	6
8	East Germany	10	1	3	6	20	57	−37	5

East Germany was relegated to Group B.

9 May	Finland	4–4	West Germany

9 May	United States	5–5	East Germany

11 May	West Germany	0–0	East Germany

11 May	United States	4–3	Finland

13 May	West Germany	8–4 (2–1, 1–1, 5–2)	United States	Sportovní hala ČSTV, Prague; Attendance: 10,000

13 May	Finland	7–2 (3–1, 4–0, 0–1)	East Germany	Sportovní hala ČSTV, Prague; Attendance: 9,500

== World Championship Group B (Yugoslavia) ==
Played in Belgrade 17–26 March.

Pos	Team	Pld	W	D	L	GF	GA	GD	Pts
9	Poland	7	6	1	0	51	19	+32	13
10	Japan	7	5	1	1	26	17	+9	11
11	Switzerland	7	4	1	2	42	32	+10	9
12	Romania	7	3	1	3	41	29	+12	7
13	Hungary	7	3	0	4	21	36	−15	6
14	Norway	7	2	1	4	29	34	−5	5
15	Italy	7	1	1	5	32	41	−9	3
16	Yugoslavia	7	1	0	6	14	48	−34	2

Undefeated Poland was promoted to Group A, and both Italy and Yugoslavia were relegated to Group C.

17 March	Italy	4–5	Japan

17 March	Switzerland	1–8	Poland

17 March	Romania	6–4	Norway

17 March	Yugoslavia	2–4	Hungary

18 March	Hungary	4–3	Norway

18 March	Yugoslavia	2–5	Poland

19 March	Romania	5–5	Italy

19 March	Japan	1–6	Switzerland

20 March	Hungary	1–2	Japan

20 March	Romania	3–7	Switzerland

20 March	Norway	4–9	Poland

20 March	Yugoslavia	3–12	Italy

21 March	Poland	7–2	Hungary

21 March	Yugoslavia	1–7	Norway

22 March	Japan	5–2	Romania

22 March	Italy	4–7	Switzerland

23 March	Hungary	0–8	Romania

23 March	Switzerland	6–6	Norway

23 March	Italy	2–12	Poland

23 March	Yugoslavia	1–6	Japan

25 March	Switzerland	12–5	Hungary

25 March	Norway	4–3	Italy

25 March	Poland	2–2	Japan

25 March	Yugoslavia	0–11	Romania

26 March	Norway	1–5	Japan

26 March	Italy	2–5	Hungary

26 March	Yugoslavia	5–3	Switzerland

26 March	Poland	8–6	Romania

== World Championship Group C (Spain) ==
Played in the Canary Islands (Las Palmas) 10–19 March.

Pos	Team	Pld	W	D	L	GF	GA	GD	Pts
17	Netherlands	7	6	1	0	74	17	+57	13
18	Austria	7	5	1	1	65	31	+34	11
19	Denmark	7	4	1	2	59	25	+34	9
20	China	7	4	0	3	47	30	+17	8
21	Bulgaria	7	3	1	3	27	30	−3	7
22	France	7	3	0	4	46	39	+7	6
23	Spain	7	1	0	6	26	84	−58	2
24	Belgium	7	0	0	7	13	101	−88	0

The Netherlands and Austria were both promoted to Group B. China and Denmark also ended up being promoted to alleviate a political situation between the Chinese and the South Koreans and to address the IIHF missing that Austria should have been disqualified for using Pentti Hyytiäinen.

10 March	China	8–4	France

10 March	Netherlands	18–3	Belgium

10 March	Austria	7–4	Denmark

10 March	Spain	2–7	Bulgaria

12 March	China	3–2	Denmark

12 March	Austria	9–7	France

12 March	Spain	11–4	Belgium

12 March	Bulgaria	0–8	Netherlands

13 March	China	12–1	Belgium

13 March	Denmark	7–6	France

13 March	Spain	0–19	Netherlands

13 March	Austria	3–3	Bulgaria

15 March	Bulgaria	10–3	Belgium

15 March	Netherlands	12–3	France

15 March	Austria	9–4	China

15 March	Spain	2–10	Denmark

16 March	Netherlands	3–3	Denmark

16 March	France	9–0	Belgium

16 March	Spain	4–14	Austria

16 March	China	2–4	Bulgaria

18 March	Austria	19–1	Belgium

18 March	Denmark	8–3	Bulgaria

18 March	Spain	3–13	France

18 March	China	4–6	Netherlands

19 March	Denmark	22–1	Belgium

19 March	Bulgaria	0–4	France

19 March	Austria	4–8	Netherlands

19 March	Spain	4–14	China

== Ranking and statistics ==
1978 IIHF World Championship winners

Soviet Union
15th title

=== Tournament Awards ===
- Best players selected by the directorate:
  - Best Goaltender: (Czechoslovakia) Jiří Holeček
  - Best Defenceman: (Soviet Union) Viacheslav Fetisov
  - Best Forward: (Canada) Marcel Dionne
- Media All-Star Team:
  - Goaltender: (Czechoslovakia) Jiří Holeček
  - Defence: (Czechoslovakia) Jiří Bubla, (Soviet Union) Viacheslav Fetisov
  - Forwards: (Czechoslovakia) Ivan Hlinka, (Soviet Union) Sergei Kapustin, (Soviet Union) Alexander Maltsev

=== Final standings ===
The final standings of the tournament according to IIHF:

1st place, gold medalist(s)	Soviet Union
2nd place, silver medalist(s)	Czechoslovakia
3rd place, bronze medalist(s)	Canada
4	Sweden
5	West Germany
6	United States
7	Finland
8	East Germany

=== European championships final standings ===
The final standings of the European championships according to IIHF:

Gold medal	Soviet Union
Silver medal	Czechoslovakia
Bronze medal	Sweden
4	West Germany
5	East Germany
6	Finland
