= 1973 Ice Hockey World Championships =

1973 edition of the World Ice Hockey Championships

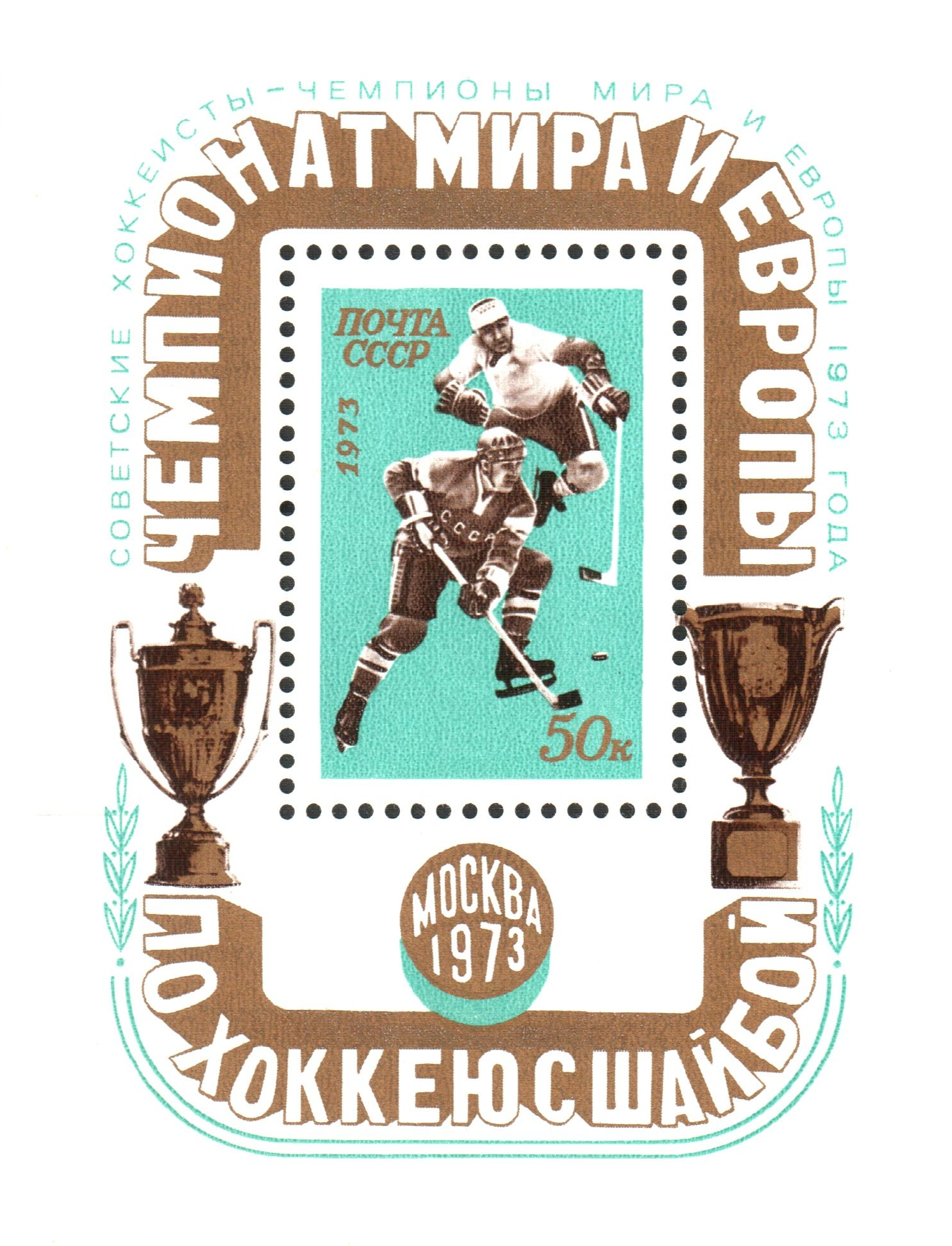
- A Soviet stamp sheet dedicated to the 1973 World Ice Hockey Championships

Tournament details
- Host country: Soviet Union
- Dates: 31 March – 15 April
- Teams: 6

Final positions
- Champions: Soviet Union (12th title)
- Runners-up: Sweden
- Third place: Czechoslovakia
- Fourth place: Finland

Tournament statistics
- Games played: 30
- Goals scored: 258 (8.6 per game)
- Attendance: 331,500 (11,050 per game)
- Scoring leader: (Soviet Union) Vladimir Petrov 34 points

The 1973 Ice Hockey World Championships were the 40th Ice Hockey World Championships and the 51st European Championships of ice hockey. The tournament took place in the Soviet Union from 31 March to 15 April and the games were played at the Palace of Sports of the Central Lenin Stadium in Moscow.

Six teams took part in the main tournament, with each team playing each other twice. The Soviet Union took back their world title and became World Champions for the 12th time.

== World Championship Group A (Soviet Union) ==
| Pos | Team | Pld | W | D | L | GF | GA | GD | Pts |
|---|---|---|---|---|---|---|---|---|---|
| 1 | Soviet Union | 10 | 10 | 0 | 0 | 100 | 18 | +82 | 20 |
| 2 | Sweden | 10 | 7 | 1 | 2 | 53 | 23 | +30 | 15 |
| 3 | Czechoslovakia | 10 | 6 | 1 | 3 | 48 | 20 | +28 | 13 |
| 4 | Finland | 10 | 3 | 1 | 6 | 24 | 39 | −15 | 7 |
| 5 | Poland | 10 | 1 | 1 | 8 | 14 | 76 | −62 | 3 |
| 6 | West Germany | 10 | 1 | 0 | 9 | 19 | 82 | −63 | 2 |

West Germany was relegated to Group B.

| 31 March | Czechoslovakia | 14–1 | Poland |

| 31 March | Soviet Union | 17–1 | West Germany |

| 1 April | Poland | 2–11 | Sweden |

| 1 April | Finland | 8–3 | West Germany |

| 2 April | Sweden | 2–0 | Czechoslovakia |

| 2 April | Soviet Union | 8–2 | Finland |

| 3 April | Czechoslovakia | 4–2 | West Germany |

| 3 April | Soviet Union | 9–3 | Poland |

| 4 April | West Germany | 2–8 | Sweden |

| 4 April | Poland | 0–5 | Finland |

| 5 April | Finland | 2–3 | Sweden |

| 5 April | Soviet Union | 3–2 | Czechoslovakia |

| 6 April | Poland | 2–4 | West Germany |

| 7 April | Finland | 2–4 | Czechoslovakia |

| 7 April | Soviet Union | 6–1 | Sweden |

| 8 April | Poland | 1–4 | Czechoslovakia |

| 8 April | West Germany | 2–18 | Soviet Union |

| 9 April | Sweden | 7–0 | Poland |

| 9 April | Finland | 2–1 | West Germany |

| 10 April | Czechoslovakia | 3–3 | Sweden |

| 10 April | Soviet Union | 9–1 | Finland |

| 11 April | West Germany | 2–7 | Czechoslovakia |

| 11 April | Soviet Union | 20–0 | Poland |

| 12 April | Sweden | 12–1 | West Germany |

| 12 April | Finland | 1–1 | Poland |

| 13 April | Sweden | 2–1 | Finland |

| 13 April | Soviet Union | 4–2 | Czechoslovakia |

| 14 April | West Germany | 1–4 | Poland |

| 15 April | Czechoslovakia | 8–0 | Finland |

| 15 April | Soviet Union | 6–4 | Sweden |

== World Championship Group B (Austria) ==
Played in Graz, 22 to 31 March. The Austrian team was coached by Father David Bauer who had established the Canada men's national ice hockey team.

| Pos | Team | Pld | W | D | L | GF | GA | GD | Pts |
|---|---|---|---|---|---|---|---|---|---|
| 7 | East Germany | 7 | 7 | 0 | 0 | 56 | 21 | +35 | 14 |
| 8 | United States | 7 | 5 | 1 | 1 | 52 | 23 | +29 | 11 |
| 9 | Yugoslavia | 7 | 4 | 2 | 1 | 36 | 22 | +14 | 10 |
| 10 | Romania | 7 | 4 | 1 | 2 | 24 | 20 | +4 | 9 |
| 11 | Austria | 7 | 2 | 0 | 5 | 21 | 44 | −23 | 4 |
| 12 | Japan | 7 | 2 | 0 | 5 | 23 | 28 | −5 | 4 |
| 13 | Switzerland | 7 | 2 | 0 | 5 | 26 | 44 | −18 | 4 |
| 14 | Italy | 7 | 0 | 0 | 7 | 18 | 54 | −36 | 0 |

East Germany was promoted to Group A, both Switzerland and Italy were relegated to group C. Rating Austria, Japan and Switzerland against each other head to head, they each had two points, Austria had a goal differential of +2, Japan +1, and Switzerland -3.

| 22 March | United States | 6–4 | Japan |

| 22 March | East Germany | 6–4 | Yugoslavia |

| 22 March | Switzerland | 4–3 | Italy |

| 22 March | Austria | 2–4 | Romania |

| 23 March | Yugoslavia | 6–6 | United States |

| 23 March | Austria | 6–5 | Italy |

| 24 March | Romania | 3–0 | Japan |

| 24 March | East Germany | 8–5 | Switzerland |

| 25 March | United States | 4–6 | East Germany |

| 25 March | Italy | 2–5 | Romania |

| 25 March | Yugoslavia | 6–0 | Switzerland |

| 25 March | Austria | 2–4 | Japan |

| 26 March | United States | 11–0 | Italy |

| 26 March | Austria | 1–6 | Yugoslavia |

| 27 March | Japan | 4–5 | Switzerland |

| 27 March | East Germany | 4–2 | Romania |

| 28 March | East Germany | 5–3 | Japan |

| 28 March | Romania | 5–4 | Switzerland |

| 28 March | Yugoslavia | 8–4 | Italy |

| 28 March | Austria | 0–9 | United States |

| 30 March | United States | 6–3 | Romania |

| 30 March | Yugoslavia | 4–3 | Japan |

| 30 March | Italy | 1–15 | East Germany |

| 30 March | Austria | 8–4 | Switzerland |

| 31 March | Italy | 3–5 | Japan |

| 31 March | Switzerland | 4–10 | United States |

| 31 March | Yugoslavia | 2–2 | Romania |

| 31 March | Austria | 2–12 | East Germany |

== World Championship Group C (Netherlands) ==
Played in Geleen, Rotterdam, Nijmegen, Utrecht, Tilburg and The Hague, from 9 to 18 March.

| Pos | Team | Pld | W | D | L | GF | GA | GD | Pts |
|---|---|---|---|---|---|---|---|---|---|
| 15 | Norway | 7 | 7 | 0 | 0 | 53 | 14 | +39 | 14 |
| 16 | Netherlands | 7 | 5 | 0 | 2 | 52 | 21 | +31 | 10 |
| 17 | Hungary | 7 | 5 | 0 | 2 | 44 | 24 | +20 | 10 |
| 18 | Bulgaria | 7 | 3 | 1 | 3 | 29 | 28 | +1 | 7 |
| 19 | China | 7 | 2 | 2 | 3 | 21 | 28 | −7 | 6 |
| 20 | France | 7 | 3 | 0 | 4 | 23 | 29 | −6 | 6 |
| 21 | Denmark | 7 | 0 | 2 | 5 | 22 | 58 | −36 | 2 |
| 22 | Great Britain | 7 | 0 | 1 | 6 | 18 | 60 | −42 | 1 |

Norway and the Netherlands were promoted to Group B.

| 9 March | China | 3–3 | Denmark |

| 9 March | Hungary | 9–0 | Great Britain |

| 9 March | Norway | 4–3 | Bulgaria |

| 9 March | Netherlands | 2–4 | France |

| 10 March | China | 3–3 | Bulgaria |

| 10 March | France | 3–1 | Great Britain |

| 10 March | Norway | 14–2 | Denmark |

| 10 March | Netherlands | 5–3 | Hungary |

| 12 March | Norway | 4–0 | China |

| 12 March | Bulgaria | 2–1 | Denmark |

| 12 March | Hungary | 7–1 | France |

| 12 March | Netherlands | 13–3 | Great Britain |

| 13 March | France | 6–3 | Denmark |

| 13 March | Norway | 11–3 | Great Britain |

| 13 March | Hungary | 9–6 | China |

| 13 March | Netherlands | 8–5 | Bulgaria |

| 15 March | China | 2–1 | France |

| 15 March | Bulgaria | 9–2 | Great Britain |

| 15 March | Norway | 6–0 | Hungary |

| 15 March | Netherlands | 14–0 | Denmark |

| 16 March | Norway | 8–3 | France |

| 16 March | Hungary | 5–1 | Bulgaria |

| 16 March | Great Britain | 8–8 | Denmark |

| 16 March | Netherlands | 7–0 | China |

| 18 March | China | 7–1 | Great Britain |

| 18 March | Bulgaria | 6–5 | France |

| 18 March | Hungary | 11–5 | Denmark |

| 18 March | Netherlands | 3–6 | Norway |

== Ranking and statistics ==
1973 IIHF World Championship winners

Soviet Union
12th title

=== Tournament Awards ===
- Best players selected by the directorate:
  - Best Goaltender: (Czechoslovakia) Jiří Holeček
  - Best Defenceman: (Soviet Union) Valeri Vasiliev
  - Best Forward: (Soviet Union) Boris Mikhailov
- Media All-Star Team:
  - Goaltender: (Czechoslovakia) Jiří Holeček
  - Defence: (Soviet Union) Alexander Gusev, (Sweden) Börje Salming
  - Forwards: (Soviet Union) Valeri Kharlamov, (Soviet Union) Boris Mikhailov, (Soviet Union) Vladimir Petrov

=== Final standings ===
The final standings of the tournament according to IIHF:

| 1st place, gold medalist(s) | Soviet Union |
| 2nd place, silver medalist(s) | Sweden |
| 3rd place, bronze medalist(s) | Czechoslovakia |
| 4 | Finland |
| 5 | Poland |
| 6 | West Germany |

=== European championships final standings ===
The final standings of the European championships according to IIHF:

| Gold medal | Soviet Union |
| Silver medal | Sweden |
| Bronze medal | Czechoslovakia |
| 4 | Finland |
| 5 | Poland |
| 6 | West Germany |
