= Soviet Union men's national ice hockey team =

Former men's national ice hockey team representing the Soviet Union

Soviet Union
- Nickname: The Red Machine (Russian: Красная машина)
- Most games: Alexander Maltsev (321)
- Top scorer: Alexander Maltsev (213)
- Most points: Sergei Makarov (248)
- IIHF code: URS
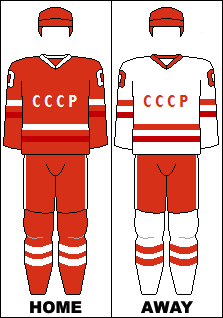

First international
- Soviet Union 23–2 East Germany (East Berlin, East Germany; 22 April 1951)

Biggest win
- Soviet Union 28–2 Italy (Colorado Springs, United States; 26 December 1967)

Biggest defeat
- Canada 8–2 Soviet Union (Ottawa, Canada; 9 January 1968); Czechoslovakia 9–3 Soviet Union (Prague, Czechoslovakia; 21 March 1975)

Olympics
- Appearances: 9 (first in 1956)
- Medals: Gold: 7 (1956, 1964, 1968, 1972, 1976, 1984, 1988); Silver: 1 (1980); Bronze: 1 (1960)

IIHF World Championships
- Appearances: 32 (first in 1954)
- Best result: Gold: 22 (1954, 1956, 1963, 1964, 1965, 1966, 1967, 1968, 1969, 1970, 1971, 1973, 1974, 1975, 1978, 1979, 1981, 1982, 1983, 1986, 1989, 1990)

Canada Cup
- Appearances: 5 (first in 1976)
- Best result: Winner: 1 (1981)

International record (W–L–T)
- 738–110–65

Medal record

Representing Soviet Union

Olympic Games
Gold medal – first place	1956 Cortina d'Ampezzo	
Gold medal – first place	1964 Innsbruck	
Gold medal – first place	1968 Grenoble	
Gold medal – first place	1972 Sapporo	
Gold medal – first place	1976 Innsbruck	
Gold medal – first place	1984 Sarajevo	
Gold medal – first place	1988 Calgary	
Silver medal – second place	1980 Lake Placid	
Bronze medal – third place	1960 Squaw Valley	

Canada Cup
Gold medal – first place	1981 Canada	

World Championship
Gold medal – first place	1954 Sweden	
Gold medal – first place	1963 Sweden	
Gold medal – first place	1965 Finland	
Gold medal – first place	1966 Yugoslavia	
Gold medal – first place	1967 Austria	
Gold medal – first place	1968 France	
Gold medal – first place	1969 Sweden	
Gold medal – first place	1970 Sweden	
Gold medal – first place	1971 Switzerland	
Gold medal – first place	1973 Soviet Union	
Gold medal – first place	1974 Finland	
Gold medal – first place	1975 West Germany	
Gold medal – first place	1978 Czechoslovakia	
Gold medal – first place	1979 Soviet Union	
Gold medal – first place	1981 Sweden	
Gold medal – first place	1982 Finland	
Gold medal – first place	1983 West Germany	
Gold medal – first place	1986 Soviet Union	
Gold medal – first place	1989 Sweden	
Gold medal – first place	1990 Switzerland	
Silver medal – second place	1955 West Germany	
Silver medal – second place	1957 Soviet Union	
Silver medal – second place	1958 Norway	
Silver medal – second place	1959 Czechoslovakia	
Silver medal – second place	1972 Czechoslovakia	
Silver medal – second place	1976 Poland	
Silver medal – second place	1987 Austria	
Bronze medal – third place	1961 Switzerland	
Bronze medal – third place	1977 Austria	
Bronze medal – third place	1985 Czechoslovakia	
Bronze medal – third place	1991 Finland	

The Soviet national ice hockey team (Note: Russian: Сборная СССР по хоккею с шайбой, romanized: Sbornaya SSSR po khokkeyu s shayboy) was the national men's ice hockey team of the Soviet Union. From 1954 to 1991, the team won at least one medal each year at either the Ice Hockey World Championships or the Olympic hockey tournament.

After dissolution of the Soviet Union in December 1991, the Soviet team competed as the CIS team (part of the Unified Team) at the 1992 Winter Olympics. After the Olympics, the CIS team ceased to exist and was replaced by Russia at the 1992 World Championship. Other former Soviet republics (Belarus, Estonia, Kazakhstan, Latvia, Lithuania and Ukraine) established their own national teams later that year. The International Ice Hockey Federation (IIHF) recognized the Ice Hockey Federation of Russia as the successor to the Soviet Union hockey federation and passed its ranking on to Russia. The other national hockey teams were considered new and sent to compete in Pool C.

The IIHF Centennial All-Star Team included four Soviet-Russian players out of a team of six: goalie Vladislav Tretiak, defenseman Vyacheslav Fetisov and forwards Valeri Kharlamov and Sergei Makarov who played for the Soviet team in the 1970s and the 1980s.

== History ==
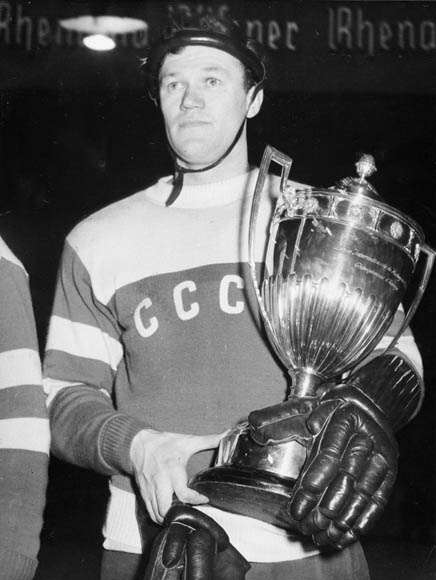
Vsevolod Bobrov during the 1956 Winter Olympics, the Soviet Union's first appearance at the Olympics.

Ice hockey was not properly introduced into the Soviet Union until the 1940s, though bandy, a similar game played on a larger ice field, had long been popular in the country. It was during a tour of FC Dynamo Moscow of the United Kingdom in 1945 that Soviet officials first got the idea of establishing an ice hockey program. They watched several exhibition matches in London, and National Hockey League President Clarence Campbell would later say that "This was the time when the Russians got the idea for their hockey team. The Russian soccer players were more interested in watching Canadian players play hockey than in soccer." The Soviet Championship League was established in 1946, and the national team was formed shortly after, playing their first matches in a series of exhibitions against LTC Praha in 1948.

The Soviets planned to send a team to the 1953 World Championships, but due to an injury to Vsevolod Bobrov, one of their star players, officials decided against going. They would make their debut at the 1954 World Championships instead. Largely unknown to the larger hockey world, the team surprised many by winning the gold medal, defeating Canada in the final game. In 2013, the Soviet national team was awarded the IIHF Milestone Award for winning the gold medal in their first appearance at the World Championships and the beginning of a rivalry against Canada.

The Soviets played their first exhibition tour in Canada in 1957, which perpetuated a rivalry between the countries. Throughout the rest of the 1950s the World Championships were largely contested between Canada and the Soviet Union. That changed in the early 1960s. Canada won the gold in 1961, and after missing the 1962 tournament due to political issues, the Soviets would win the gold medal every year until 1972. They faced perhaps their greatest upset at the 1976 World Championships; in their opening match against host Poland, the Soviets were defeated 6–4.

In 1972 the Soviets played Canada in an exhibition series that saw the Soviet national team play a team composed of National Hockey League (NHL) players for the first time. Both the Olympics and World Championships did not allow professionals, so the best Canadian players were never able to compete against the Soviets, and in protest at this Canada had left international hockey in 1970. This series, known as the Summit Series, was a chance to see how the NHL players would fare. In eight games (four in Canada, four in the USSR), the teams were close, and it took until the final 34 seconds of the eighth game for Canada to win the series, four games to three, with one tie.

At the 1980 Winter Olympics, the Soviets also had one of their most notable losses. Playing the United States in the medal round, the Soviets lost 4–3. This match, later dubbed the Miracle on Ice, was notable because it had the Soviets, recognized as the top international team in the world, against an American team composed largely of university-level players. The Americans would go on to win the gold medal in the tournament, while the Soviets finished with the silver, only the second time they failed to win gold at the Olympics since their debut in 1956.

The reforms of the 1980s in the Soviet Union had a detrimental effect on the national team. No longer afraid to speak out against their treatment, players like Viacheslav Fetisov and Igor Larionov openly critiqued the management style of their coach, Viktor Tikhonov, which included being secluded in a military-style barracks for eleven months of the year. They also sought the chance to move to North America and play in the NHL, though the authorities were reluctant to allow this. Negotiations with the NHL began in the late 1980s over this, and in 1989 several players, including both Fetisov and Larionov, were permitted to leave the Soviet Union and join NHL teams.

Yuri Korolev was head of the research group for the national men's team from 1964 to 1992, and contributed to the team winning seventeen Ice Hockey World Championships and seven Winter Olympic Games gold medals.

Journalist Vsevolod Kukushkin traveled with the national team as both a reporter and an English to Russian translator. He had access to the team's locker room and the opportunity to speak directly with the players and be part of their daily life. In his 2016 book The Red Machine, Kukushkin reported that the nickname for the Soviet national team came into usage during the 1983 Super Series, when a headline in a Minneapolis newspaper headline read "The Red Machine rolled down on us".

=== Amateur status of players ===
The Soviet team was populated with amateur players who were primarily full-time athletes hired as regular workers of a company (aircraft industry, food workers, tractor industry) or organization (KGB, Red Army, Soviet Air Force) that sponsored what would be presented as an after-hours social sports society hockey team for their workers in order to keep their amateur status. However, these players spent all their working hours practicing or training instead of doing their purported industry jobs.

By the 1970s, several national hockey federations, such as Canada, protested the use of the amateur status for players of Eastern Bloc teams and even withdrew from the 1972 and 1976 Winter Games in protest.

Until 1977, professional players were not able to participate in the World Championship, and it was not until 1988 that they could play in the Winter Olympics. Starting in 1989, Soviet players were permitted to join the NHL, but NHL teams would not release their players to participate in the 1992 and 1994 Winter Olympics. The 1998 Winter Olympics was the first time that the NHL took a break to allow active players to participate.

== Statistics ==
Leading scorers (Olympics, World Championships, Canada Cups, 1972 Summit Series)

1. Sergei Makarov – 248 points
2. Aleksandr Maltsev – 213+ points
3. Valeri Kharlamov – 199 points
4. Boris Mikhailov – 180 points
5. Vladimir Petrov – 176 points

== Tournament record ==
=== Olympic Games ===
Games	GP	W	L	T	GF	GA	Coach	Captain	Finish
(Italy) 1956 Cortina d'Ampezzo	7	7	0	0	40	9	Arkady Chernyshev	Vsevolod Bobrov	Gold
(United States) 1960 Squaw Valley	7	4	2	1	40	23	Anatoli Tarasov	Nikolai Sologubov	Bronze
(Austria) 1964 Innsbruck	8	8	0	0	73	11	Arkady Chernyshev	Boris Mayorov	Gold
(France) 1968 Grenoble	7	6	1	0	48	10	Arkady Chernyshev	Boris Mayorov	Gold
(Japan) 1972 Sapporo	5	4	0	1	33	13	Arkady Chernyshev	Viktor Kuzkin	Gold
(Austria) 1976 Innsbruck	6	6	0	0	56	14	Boris Kulagin	Boris Mikhailov	Gold
(United States) 1980 Lake Placid	7	6	1	0	63	17	Viktor Tikhonov	Boris Mikhailov	Silver
(Socialist Federal Republic of Yugoslavia) 1984 Sarajevo	7	7	0	0	48	5	Viktor Tikhonov	Viacheslav Fetisov	Gold
(Canada) 1988 Calgary	8	7	1	0	45	13	Viktor Tikhonov	Viacheslav Fetisov	Gold
(France) 1992 Albertville	As Unified Team								
1994 – present	Since 1994 Soviet Union and Unified Team have been succeeded by Russia								

=== World Championship ===
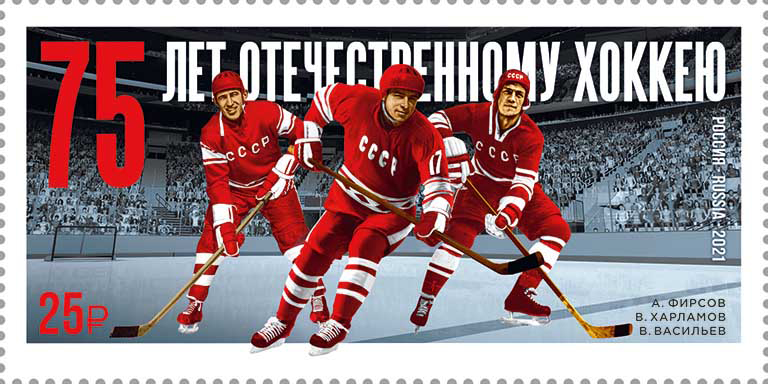
75th anniversary Russian postage stamp

Year	Location	Result
1954	Stockholm, Sweden	Gold
1955	Krefeld / Dortmund / Cologne, West Germany	Silver
1957	Moscow, Soviet Union	Silver
1958	Oslo, Norway	Silver
1959	Prague / Bratislava, Czechoslovakia	Silver
1961	Geneva / Lausanne, Switzerland	Bronze
1963	Stockholm, Sweden	Gold
1965	Tampere, Finland	Gold
1966	Ljubljana, Yugoslavia	Gold
1967	Vienna, Austria	Gold
1968	Grenoble, France	Gold
1969	Stockholm, Sweden	Gold
1970	Stockholm, Sweden	Gold
1971	Bern / Geneva, Switzerland	Gold
1972	Prague, Czechoslovakia	Silver
1973	Moscow, Soviet Union	Gold
1974	Helsinki, Finland	Gold
1975	Munich / Düsseldorf, West Germany	Gold
1976	Katowice, Poland	Silver
1977	Vienna, Austria	Bronze
1978	Prague, Czechoslovakia	Gold
1979	Moscow, Soviet Union	Gold
1981	Gothenburg / Stockholm, Sweden	Gold
1982	Helsinki / Tampere, Finland	Gold
1983	Düsseldorf / Dortmund / Munich, West Germany	Gold
1985	Prague, Czechoslovakia	Bronze
1986	Moscow, Soviet Union	Gold
1987	Vienna, Austria	Silver
1989	Stockholm / Södertälje, Sweden	Gold
1990	Bern / Fribourg, Switzerland	Gold
1991	Turku / Helsinki / Tampere, Finland	Bronze

=== Summit Series ===
- 1972 – Lost to Canada
- 1974 – Won series against Canada

On the 40th anniversary of the 1972 Summit Series, the IIHF Milestone Award was given to the Canadian and Russian teams for the event which had a "decisive influence on the development of the game". Reuters wrote that Canada was expected to win the series easily, but when they came from behind to win in the eighth and final game, it marked "the beginning of the modern hockey era".

=== Canada Cup ===
- 1976 – Finished in 3rd place
- 1981 – Won championship
- 1984 – Lost semifinal
- 1987 – Lost final
- 1991 – Finished in 5th place

=== Challenge Cup and Rendez-vous vs. NHL All-Stars ===
- 1979 – Won series
- 1987 – Tied series

=== Other tournaments ===
- Deutschland Cup: (gold) Gold medal (1988, 1991)
- Nissan Cup: (gold) Gold medal (1990)

== Team ==
=== Notable players ===
Leading forwards (1970s)

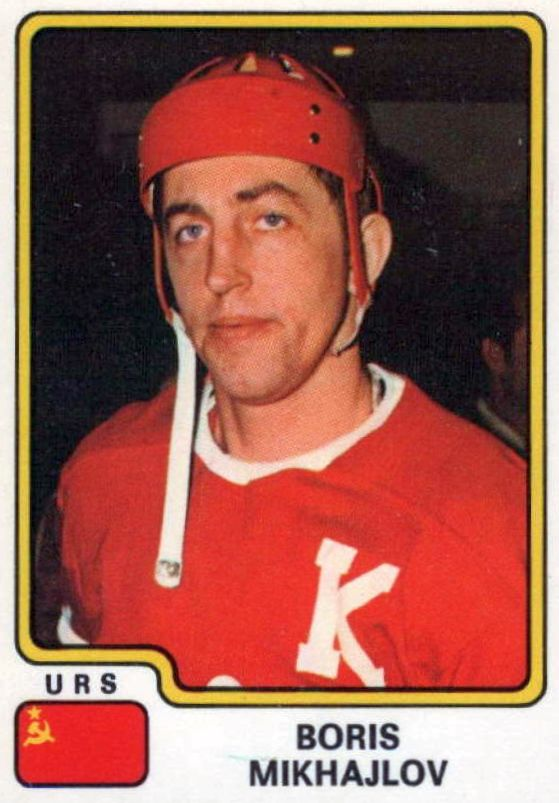

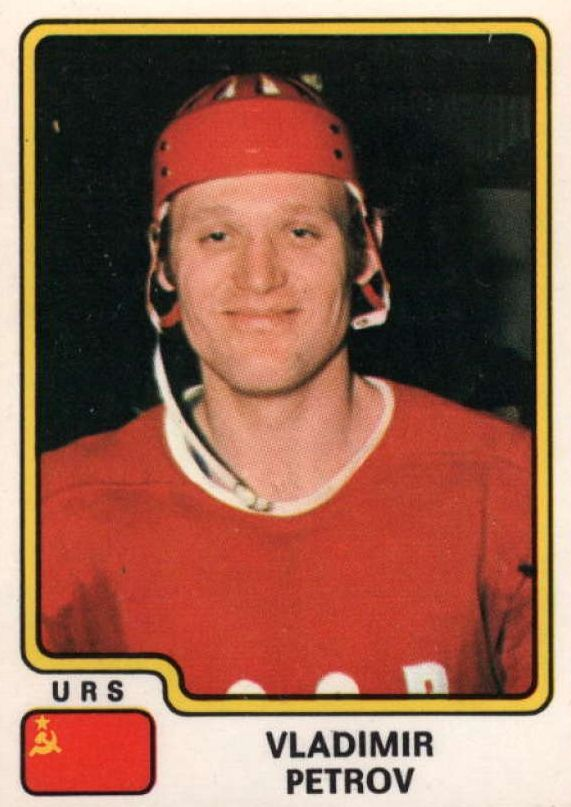

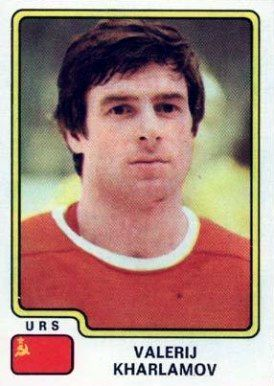
- Yevgeny Babich
- Helmuts Balderis
- Vsevolod Bobrov
- Vyacheslav Bykov
- Vitaly Davydov
- Vyacheslav Fetisov
- Anatoli Firsov
- Valeri Kamensky
- Sergei Kapustin
- Alexei Kasatonov
- Valeri Kharlamov
- Vladimir Krutov
- Alfred Kuchevsky
- Igor Larionov
- Sergei Makarov
- Alexander Maltsev
- Boris Mikhailov
- Vladimir Petrov
- Alexander Ragulin
- Vyacheslav Starshinov
- Vladislav Tretiak
- Valeri Vasiliev
- Alexander Yakushev
- Yevgeni Zimin
- Viktor Zinger

=== Coaching history ===
Years	Coach	Achievements
1953	Anatoli Tarasov	
1953–1957	Arkady Chernyshev	1 Olympic gold medal, 2 World Championship gold medals, 2 World Championship silver medals
1958–1960	Anatoli Tarasov	1 Olympic bronze medal, 2 World Championship silver medals
1961–1972	Arkady Chernyshev	3 Olympic gold medals, 9 World Championship gold medals, 1 World Championship silver medal, 1 World Championship bronze medal
1972–1974	Vsevolod Bobrov	2 World Championship gold medals
1974–1977	Boris Kulagin	1 Olympic gold medal, 1 World Championship gold medal, 1 World Championship silver medal, 1 World Championship bronze medal
1977–1991	Viktor Tikhonov	2 Olympic gold medals, 1 Olympic silver medal, 8 World Championship gold medals, 2 World Championship silver medals, 2 World Championship bronze medals

=== Former national jerseys ===
There were some exceptions to jersey colors, where the Soviet team played in red away rather than white (such as the 1981 Ice Hockey World Championships in Sweden).

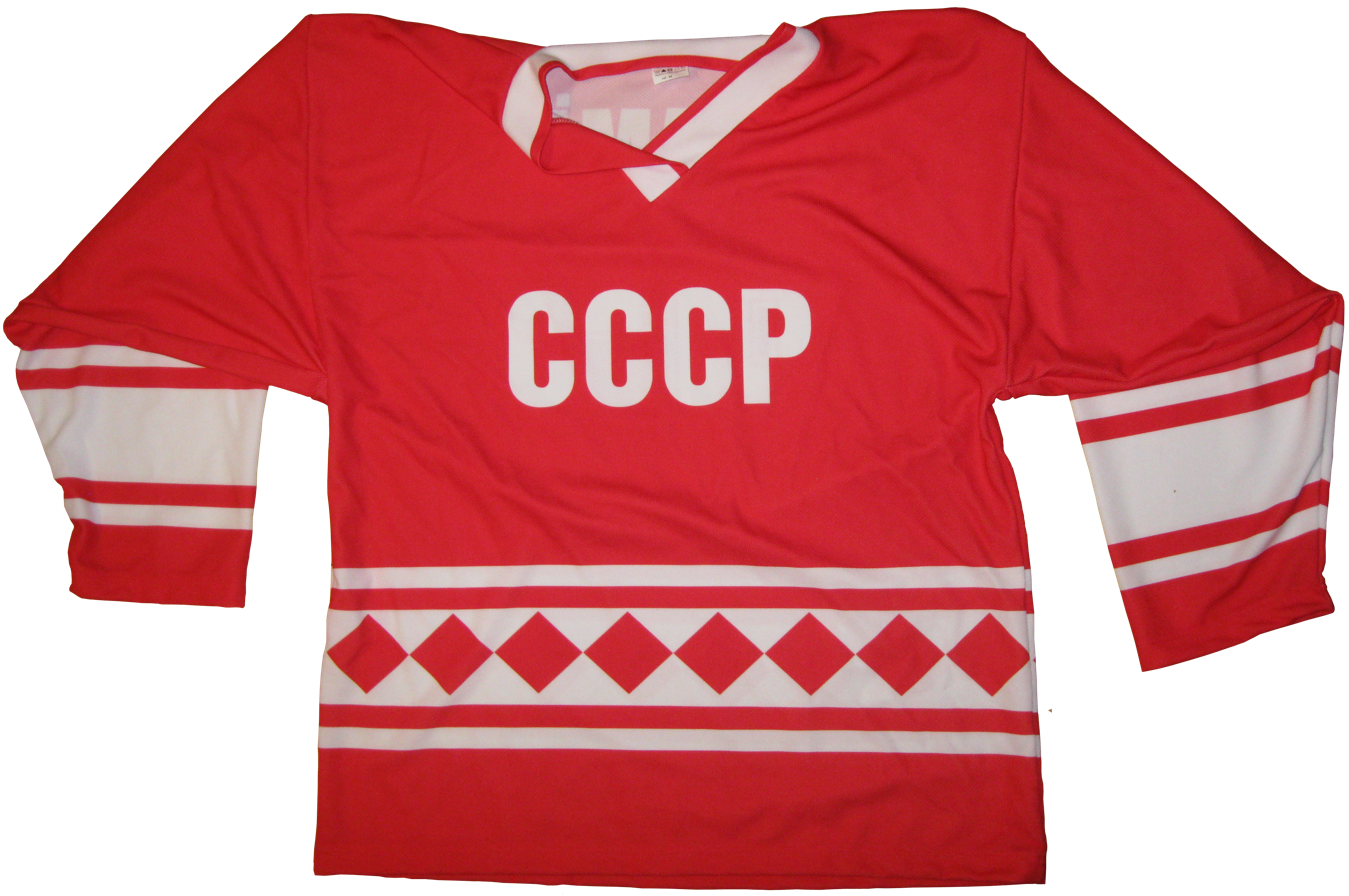
Soviet Union national ice hockey jersey

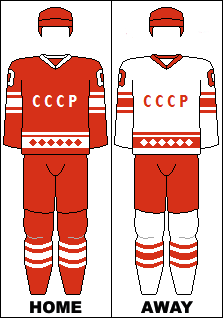
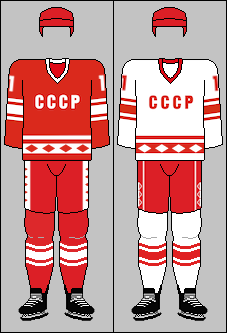
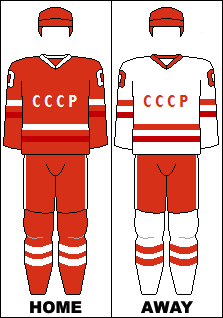
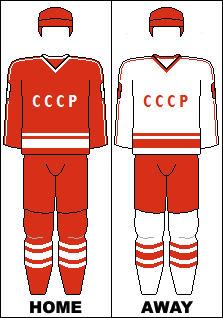
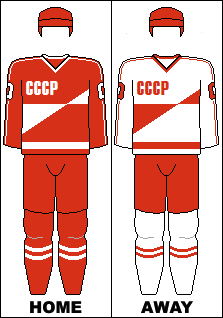
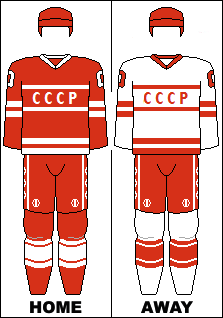
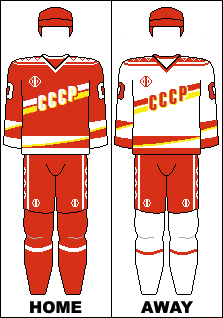

== Dissolution of the Soviet Union ==
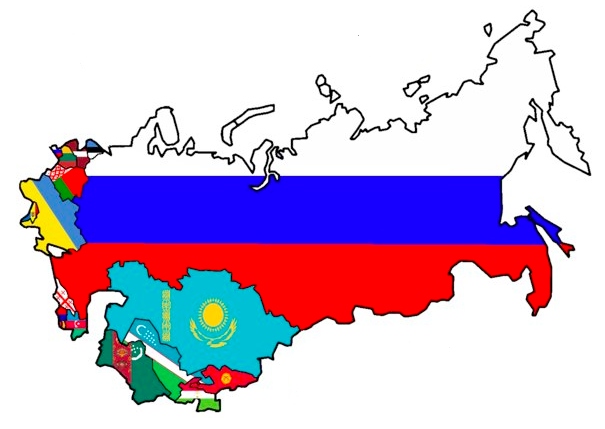

After the dissolution of the Soviet Union, Russia succeeded the Soviet Union while its other former republics started competing as their own national teams:

- Armenia men's national ice hockey team
- Azerbaijan men's national ice hockey team
- Belarus men's national ice hockey team
- Estonia men's national ice hockey team
- Georgia men's national ice hockey team
- Kazakhstan men's national ice hockey team
- Kyrgyzstan men's national ice hockey team
- Latvia men's national ice hockey team
- Lithuania men's national ice hockey team
- Turkmenistan men's national ice hockey team
- Ukraine men's national ice hockey team
- Uzbekistan men's national ice hockey team

== See also ==
- Russia national ice hockey team
- CIS national ice hockey team

== Bibliography ==
- Martin, Lawrence (1990), The Red Machine: The Soviet Quest to Dominate Canada's Game, Toronto: Doubleday Canada, ISBN 0-385-25272-2
- Podnieks, Andrew; Szemberg, Szymon (2008), World of Hockey: Celebrating a Century of the IIHF, Key Porter Books, ISBN 978-1-55168-307-2
