= 1974 Ice Hockey World Championships =

1974 edition of the World Ice Hockey Championships

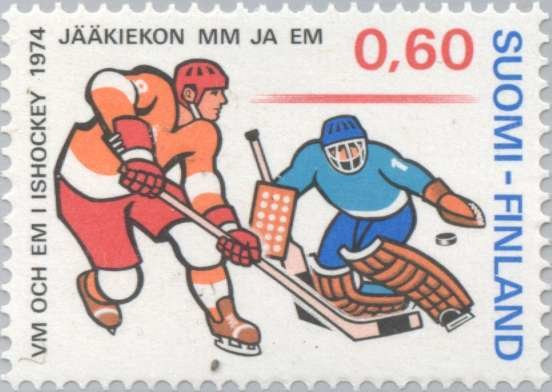

Tournament details
- Host country: Finland
- Venue: 1 (in 1 host city)
- Dates: 5–20 April
- Teams: 6

Final positions
- Champions: Soviet Union (13th title)
- Runners-up: Czechoslovakia
- Third place: Sweden
- Fourth place: Finland

Tournament statistics
- Games played: 30
- Goals scored: 236 (7.87 per game)
- Attendance: 192,856 (6,429 per game)
- Scoring leader: (Soviet Union) Boris Mikhailov 17 points

The 1974 Ice Hockey World Championships were the 41st Ice Hockey World Championships and the 52nd European Championships in ice hockey. The tournament took place in Finland from 5 to 20 April and the games were played in the capital, Helsinki. Six teams took part in the main tournament, all playing each other twice. The Soviet Union won the world championships for the 13th time, and also won their 16th European title.

The event was the second Ice Hockey World Championships hosted by Finland, and was organized by Harry Lindblad, president of the Finnish Ice Hockey Association.

For the first time in ice hockey World Championship history, two players were suspended for doping. They were the Swede Ulf Nilsson and the Finn Stig Wetzell who failed a drug test for the forbidden substance ephedrine. Both players were suspended for the rest of the tournament. Nilsson failed the test after Sweden's game against Poland, which Sweden won 4–1. The game was awarded to Poland as a 5–0 forfeit. The Finn, Wetzell, failed the test after Finland's match against Czechoslovakia, which Finland won 5–2, which was also awarded to Czechoslovakia as a 5–0 forfeit. The Finns were able to defeat Czechoslovakia again on the last day, which would have earned the Finns their first medal in history, if not for the points lost in the forfeited win.

== World Championship Group A (Finland) ==
Pos	Team	Pld	W	D	L	GF	GA	GD	Pts
1	Soviet Union	10	9	0	1	64	18	+46	18
2	Czechoslovakia	10	7	0	3	57	20	+37	14
3	Sweden	10	5	1	4	38	24	+14	11
4	Finland	10	4	2	4	34	39	−5	10
5	Poland	10	1	2	7	22	64	−42	4
6	East Germany	10	1	1	8	21	71	−50	3

East Germany were very unlucky to be relegated to Group B, as Poland's only win was the awarded default for a doping violation against Sweden.

5 April	Czechoslovakia	8–0	Poland

5 April	Soviet Union	5–0	East Germany

6 April	Poland	5–0 (1–4)	Sweden

6 April	Finland	7–3	East Germany

7 April	Sweden	2–3	Czechoslovakia

7 April	Finland	1–7	Soviet Union

8 April	Czechoslovakia	8–0	East Germany

8 April	Soviet Union	8–3	Poland

9 April	East Germany	1–10	Sweden

9 April	Finland	2–2	Poland

10 April	Czechoslovakia	7–2	Soviet Union

10 April	Finland	3–3	Sweden

11 April	Poland	3–5	East Germany

12 April	Finland	0–5 (5–2)	Czechoslovakia

12 April	Sweden	1–3	Soviet Union

13 April	Poland	3–12	Czechoslovakia

13 April	East Germany	3–10	Soviet Union

14 April	Sweden	3–1	Poland

14 April	Finland	7–1	East Germany

15 April	Czechoslovakia	0–3	Sweden

15 April	Soviet Union	6–1	Finland

16 April	East Germany	2–9	Czechoslovakia

16 April	Poland	0–17	Soviet Union

17 April	Sweden	9–3	East Germany

17 April	Finland	6–2	Poland

18 April	Soviet Union	3–1	Czechoslovakia

18 April	Finland	2–6	Sweden

19 April	East Germany	3–3	Poland

20 April	Finland	5–4	Czechoslovakia

20 April	Soviet Union	3–1	Sweden

== World Championship Group B (Yugoslavia) ==
Played in Hala Tivoli, Ljubljana, SR Slovenia, SFR Yugoslavia 21–30 March.

Pos	Team	Pld	W	D	L	GF	GA	GD	Pts
7	United States	7	7	0	0	40	14	+26	14
8	Yugoslavia	7	4	2	1	41	27	+14	10
9	West Germany	7	5	0	2	34	28	+6	10
10	Japan	7	4	0	3	31	31	0	8
11	Netherlands	7	2	1	4	33	37	−4	5
12	Romania	7	2	1	4	30	29	+1	5
13	Norway	7	1	1	5	18	31	−13	3
14	Austria	7	0	1	6	12	42	−30	1

The USA was promoted to Group A, and both Norway and Austria were relegated to Group C.

21 March	United States	7–4	Japan

21 March	West Germany	7–4	Norway

21 March	Romania	5–7	Netherlands

21 March	Yugoslavia	10–3	Austria

22 March	Netherlands	7–0	Norway

22 March	Yugoslavia	0–5	United States

23 March	Romania	10–1	Austria

23 March	West Germany	6–1	Japan

24 March	United States	5–3	Norway

24 March	West Germany	4–2	Austria

24 March	Netherlands	5–8	Japan

24 March	Yugoslavia	3–3	Romania

25 March	United States	7–4	Netherlands

25 March	Yugoslavia	4–4	Norway

26 March	Japan	4–3	Austria

26 March	West Germany	6–3	Romania

27 March	West Germany	5–3	Netherlands

27 March	United States	6–0	Austria

27 March	Romania	4–1	Norway

27 March	Yugoslavia	5–4	Japan

29 March	United States	5–1	Romania

29 March	Austria	3–3	Netherlands

29 March	Japan	4–1	Norway

29 March	Yugoslavia	10–4	West Germany

30 March	Austria	0–5	Norway

30 March	Romania	4–6	Japan

30 March	West Germany	2–5	United States

30 March	Yugoslavia	9–4	Netherlands

== World Championship Group C (France) ==
Played in Grenoble, Gap and Lyon, 8–17 March. This was North Korea's first World Championship.

Pos	Team	Pld	W	D	L	GF	GA	GD	Pts
15	Switzerland	7	6	0	1	63	4	+59	12
16	Italy	7	5	1	1	42	14	+28	11
17	Bulgaria	7	4	1	2	39	18	+21	9
18	Hungary	7	3	3	1	38	22	+16	9
19	France	7	4	0	3	37	25	+12	8
20	China	7	1	1	5	15	38	−23	3
21	Australia	7	1	0	6	13	74	−61	2
22	North Korea	7	1	0	6	12	64	−52	2

Switzerland and Italy were promoted to Group B.

8 March	Italy	11–2	North Korea

8 March	France	2–5	Bulgaria

8 March	Switzerland	13–0	China

8 March	Hungary	11–2	Australia

9 March	Switzerland	20–0	Australia

9 March	China	2–2	Hungary

9 March	France	12–4	North Korea

9 March	Italy	3–2	Bulgaria

11 March	Bulgaria	10–0	North Korea

11 March	France	1–4	Italy

11 March	Hungary	2–1	Switzerland

11 March	China	8–3	Australia

12 March	France	10–0	Australia

12 March	Bulgaria	5–5	Hungary

12 March	Switzerland	15–0	North Korea

12 March	Italy	5–1	China

14 March	Switzerland	4–0	Bulgaria

14 March	North Korea	3–2	China

14 March	Italy	13–0	Australia

14 March	France	6–4	Hungary

15 March	Hungary	10–2	North Korea

15 March	Switzerland	4–2	Italy

15 March	Bulgaria	11–4	Australia

15 March	France	6–2	China

17 March	Australia	4–1	North Korea

17 March	Italy	4–4	Hungary

17 March	Bulgaria	6–0	China

17 March	France	0–6	Switzerland

== Ranking and statistics ==
1974 IIHF World Championship winners

Soviet Union
13th title

=== Tournament Awards ===
- Best players selected by the directorate:
  - Best Goaltender: (Soviet Union) Vladislav Tretiak
  - Best Defenceman: (Sweden) Lars-Erik Sjöberg
  - Best Forward: (Czechoslovakia) Václav Nedomanský
- Media All-Star Team:
  - Goaltender: (Sweden) Curt Larsson
  - Defence: (Sweden) Lars-Erik Sjöberg, (Soviet Union) Valeri Vasiliev
  - Forwards: (Czechoslovakia) Vladimír Martinec, (Czechoslovakia) Václav Nedomanský, (Soviet Union) Alexander Yakushev

=== Final standings ===
The final standings of the tournament according to IIHF:

1st place, gold medalist(s)	Soviet Union
2nd place, silver medalist(s)	Czechoslovakia
3rd place, bronze medalist(s)	Sweden
4	Finland
5	Poland
6	East Germany

=== European championships final standings ===
The final standings of the European championships according to IIHF:

Gold medal	Soviet Union
Silver medal	Czechoslovakia
Bronze medal	Sweden
4	Finland
5	Poland
6	East Germany
