= Summit Series =

1972 USSR-Canada ice hockey series

- Hockey Canada's logo for series
	1	2	3	4	5	6	7	8	Total
Canada	3	4	4	3	4	3	4	6	4
Soviet Union	7	1	4	5	5	2	3	5	3
- Location(s): Canada (1–4); Soviet Union (5–8)
- Dates: September 2–28, 1972
- Series-winning goal: Paul Henderson (59:26, game 8)
- Hall of Famers: Canada: Bobby Clarke (1987); Yvan Cournoyer (1982); Ken Dryden (1983); Phil Esposito (1984); Tony Esposito (1988); Rod Gilbert (1982); Guy Lapointe (1993); Frank Mahovlich (1981); Stan Mikita (1983); Brad Park (1988); Gilbert Perreault (1990); Jean Ratelle (1985); Serge Savard (1986); Soviet Union: Valeri Kharlamov (2005); Vladislav Tretiak (1989); Alexander Yakushev (2018); Coaches: Harry Sinden (1983)

The Summit Series, Super Series 72, Canada–USSR Series (Russian: Суперсерия СССР — Канада, romanized: Superseriya SSSR — Kanada), or Series of the Century (French: Série du siècle), was an eight-game ice hockey series between the Soviet Union and Canada, held in September 1972. It was the first competition between the Soviet national team and a Canadian team represented by professional players of the National Hockey League (NHL), known as Team Canada. It was the first international ice hockey competition for Canada after they had withdrawn from such competitions in a dispute with the International Ice Hockey Federation (IIHF). The series was organized with the intention to create a true best-against-best competition in the sport of ice hockey. The Soviets had become the dominant team in international competitions, in which the Canadian professionals were ineligible to play. Canada had had a long history of dominance of the sport prior to the Soviets' rise.

The first four games of the series were held in Canada and the final four in Moscow. The Soviet Union surprised the Canadian team and most of the Canadian hockey media with an opening game victory, 7–3. Many Canadian sportswriters had predicted an overwhelming victory for Canada in the series. Canada won the next game 4–1; the third game was a tie. Canada lost the fourth game in Vancouver. The series resumed two weeks later in Moscow. The Soviets won the fifth game to take a two-game lead. The Canadians then won the final three games in Moscow to win the series four games to three, with one tie. The final game was won in dramatic fashion, with the Canadians overcoming a two-goal Soviet lead after two periods. The Canadians scored three times in the third, the final goal with 34 seconds left by Paul Henderson.

The series was played during the Cold War, and intense feelings of nationalism were aroused in fans in both Canada and the Soviet Union and players on the ice. The games introduced several talented Soviet players to North America, such as Hockey Hall of Fame inductees Alexander Yakushev, Valeri Kharlamov and goaltender Vladislav Tretiak. Team Canada, the first NHL and professional all-star team formed for international play, was led by Phil Esposito, who led the series in scoring, as well as contributing in other roles. The Canadian line of Bobby Clarke, Ron Ellis and Henderson, which was not expected to start for the team, as none were yet stars, played a surprisingly large role in the Canadian victory, with Henderson scoring the game-winning goal in each of the final three games. The series was filled with controversy, including disputes over officiating, and dirty play on the part of both teams highlighted by the deliberate slash of Kharlamov by Clarke in game six. There was also the exclusion of top Canadian player Bobby Hull, the second leading goalscorer in the NHL the previous season and who had led the league in goalscoring seven times, because he had signed a contract to play in the new World Hockey Association (WHA). A knee injury forced superstar defenceman Bobby Orr, the second leading point scorer in the league the previous season and scoring champion two years prior, to sit out.

== Background ==
From the beginning of the IIHF Ice Hockey World Championships in 1920, Canada would send a senior amateur club team, usually the previous year's Allan Cup champion, to compete as the Canadian entry. These teams were often university players or unpaid players playing ice hockey while being employed in some other profession full-time. From the 1920s until the 1950s, Canadian amateur club teams won most of the World Championship and Olympic titles. As a career, Canadian players would play instead in the various professional hockey leagues, the best reaching the NHL. Their professional status made them ineligible to play in the World Championships or Olympic Winter Games under the rules of the time. The last Canadian amateur club to win the world championship were the Trail Smoke Eaters in the 1961 championship.

In the earliest days of the Soviet Union, bandy or "Russian hockey" was played, not "Canadian hockey", and the Soviets did not compete in the Olympics or World Championships for ice hockey, which played the Canadian game. Post-World War II, a goal of the Central Committee of the Soviet Union was world supremacy in sport. The decision was made to transfer resources to the Canadian game. Starting in the 1940s, the Soviet Union started a Soviet hockey league playing the Canadian game. The elite sports societies of the Soviet Union, such as CSKA Moscow (Central Sports Club Army), Dynamo and Spartak, soon became the elite teams of the hockey league and supplied the players for the national team. Ostensibly amateurs, the players played hockey full-time and were paid by the government. The players had other titular professions; for example Moscow Dynamo players became officers of the KGB; CSKA Moscow players became officers in the army. This preserved a player's amateur status for Olympic and World Championship eligibility, and the players would have a career after their hockey playing days ended.

Entering international play in 1954, the Soviet national team, under the tutelage of Anatoly Tarasov, started to dominate the international competitions and won nine consecutive championships in the 1960s. In response, Canada developed a national team of its own. But Canada's best players usually became professionals, and the national team featured mostly university players. The Canadian team did not win any championships and was looked upon as a failure. By 1969, the Government of Canada had formed Hockey Canada, an organization to co-ordinate Canadian international play with its amateur organizations and the NHL. In July 1969, on a trial basis, the inclusion of nine professional players for any event for one year was agreed to by the IIHF. Canada entered a team with five professionals in the Izvestia tournament at Christmas in 1969, and nearly won the tournament. The IIHF then convened an emergency meeting in January 1970, and the rule allowing professionals was rescinded. In response, Canada withdrew from IIHF play. The 1970 IIHF World Championships, scheduled to be held in Canada for the first time, were transferred to Sweden after Canada refused to host the event.

== Organization ==
In the early 1970s, the idea of meetings between the national teams of the USSR and Canada began to be actively discussed again. Its main initiator was the Сhairman of the State Committee for Physical Culture and Sports of the USSR, Sergei Pavlov. The Canadian embassy in Moscow learned of the Soviets' interest in a series initially through reading an article in the Soviet Izvestia newspaper in the winter of 1971–1972. Diplomat Gary Smith, responsible for sport and cultural exchanges with the Soviet Union, read In December 1971 that the Soviets were looking for a new challenge in ice hockey. Smith met with Izvestia sports editor Boris Fedosov initially, then followed up with a meeting with Soviet hockey boss Andrei Starovoytov and other Soviet officials in January. The Soviets divulged that they were ready to play in a series between its national team and Canadian professionals. After the meetings, Canadian ambassador Robert Ford passed the matter to Ottawa to negotiate a series and Hockey Canada was given the task to nail down the terms for a series. In March, Canada proposed a round-robin tournament including Sweden and Czechoslovakia in September, with a fallback proposal for bilateral games instead. The Soviets agreed in principle with the resumption of ice hockey contacts with Canada, depending on the final conditions to be negotiated in April.

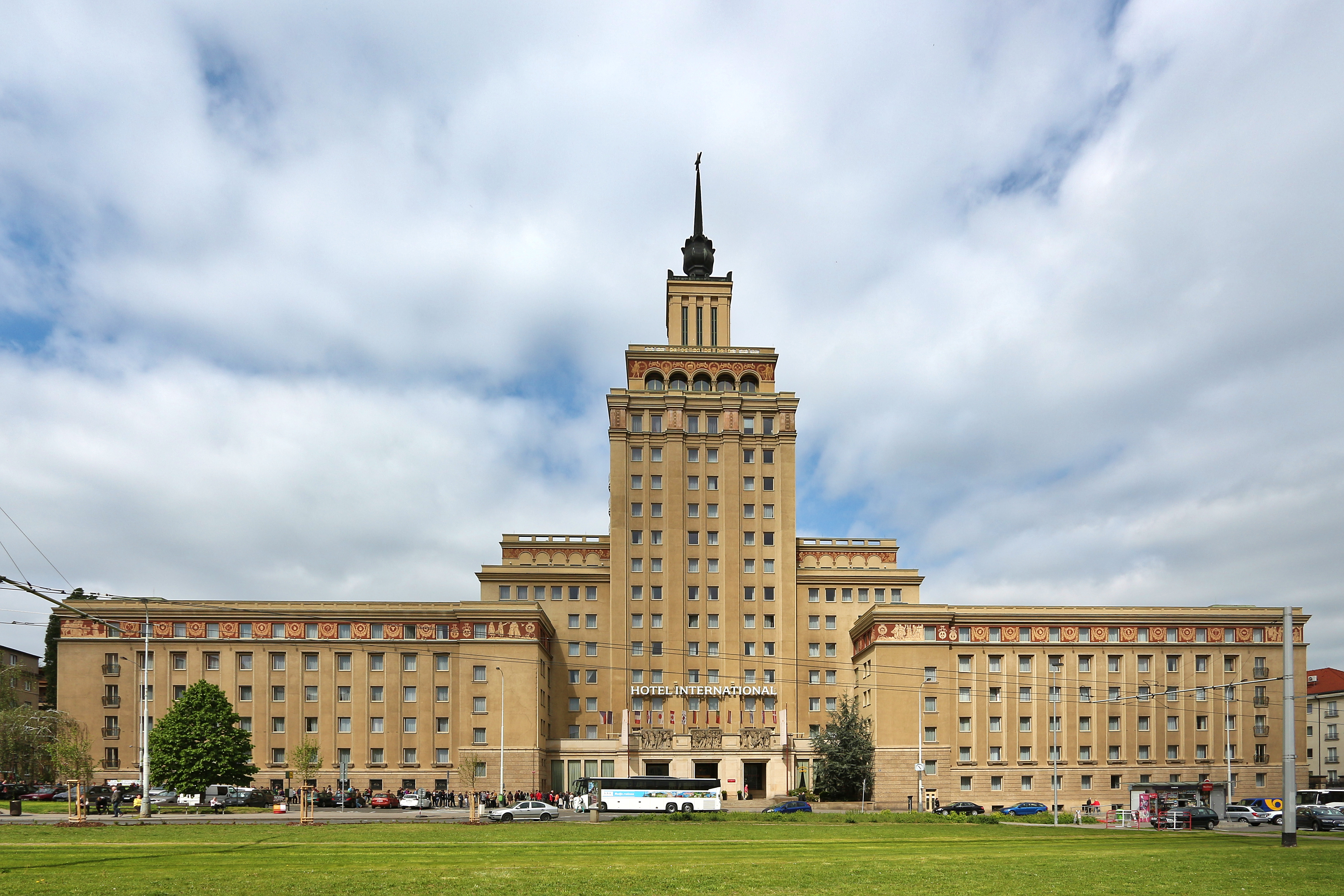
Negotiations for a series were finalized at Hotel International Prague in 1972.

The negotiations for the series were finalized at the Hotel International Prague during the 1972 World Ice Hockey Championships in April 1972. A "Letter of Agreement" was agreed upon and was signed on April 18, 1972, by Joe Kryczka, the Canadian Amateur Hockey Association (CAHA) president, Starovoytov the Soviet Union Ice Hockey Federation general secretary, Bunny Ahearne the president of the IIHF, and former CAHA president Fred Page as the vice-president of the IIHF.

The two sides agreed on the terms: four games in Canada in early September, and four games later in the month in the Soviet Union. Kryczka also announced that two games were to be held in Sweden before the Moscow segment of the series as part of a celebration of the fiftieth anniversary of ice hockey in Sweden. He also announced that Team Canada hoped to play a game or two in Czechoslovakia in return for previous visits by Czechoslovak teams to Canada. NHL President Clarence Campbell issued a statement that the league fully supported the proposed series.

The two sides agreed to hold the series in September and play the games under international rules. The Canadians agreed to IIHF amateur referees in the Canada part of the series, and European referees in the Moscow games. The refereeing would use the international two referee system, not the one referee, two linesmen system in place in the NHL, and, at the time, being introduced into international play. The Canadian side agreed to the terms under the belief that the Canadians would have no difficulty winning under any set of conditions. Kryczka felt that the Soviets had demanded the concessions for their own benefit, believing that their team was already equal to any NHL team. The agreement stipulated that Soviet players were to be paid CA$5,000 per game in Canada, and Canadian players were to be paid 5,000 Rbls per game in Moscow. It also stipulated the choice of referees was acceptable to both parties. Teams were limited to 19 players and a total of 30, including officials, with allowances for changes between the Canadian and Moscow segments.

During the summer, further details were settled. The Canadian games were scheduled for Montreal (Montreal Forum), Toronto (Maple Leaf Gardens), Winnipeg (Winnipeg Arena), and Vancouver (Pacific Coliseum) and the games in the Soviet Union were all to be held in Moscow at the Luzhniki Ice Palace. The NHL players at first objected to the September dates, suggesting dates in October or November when they would be in better shape but the idea was rejected by the Soviets. A game in Prague, at first proposed following the Swedish games and before travel to Moscow, was moved to take place after the Moscow series.

NHL players' union executive director and Hockey Canada director Alan Eagleson, while not involved in the initial negotiations, became a central figure in the organization of the series. Eagleson, who could call on a personal network of players, NHL owners, Hockey Canada executives and Canadian business, would be involved in most arrangements for the Canadian team. Eagleson would confide to Toronto Star reporter Alexander Ross, that he "un-negotiated" much of what had been negotiated between the governments. Eagleson placated the NHL owners by arranging that part of the series' proceeds would go to the NHL player's pension fund, reducing payments from the owners, and threatening to have his player clients play without NHL co-operation. Before the first game, Eagleson personally paid to settle a lawsuit won by a Montreal man, whose car had been destroyed in the 1968 Warsaw Pact invasion of Czechoslovakia. The court had ordered the Soviet team's hockey equipment seized to guarantee payment, threatening the start of the series.

Former Boston Bruins' coach Harry Sinden, who had been out of hockey since leaving the Bruins in 1970, was suggested by the media as a good candidate for the job of Team Canada's coach. Ron Brown, a sportswriter from Kingston, Ontario called Sinden and in the interview, Sinden admitted that he was available and willing to take the position. After a phone call from Sinden to Alan Eagleson, it was arranged for Sinden to have an interview with Hockey Canada's steering committee for the series in June. After the one interview, Hockey Canada selected Sinden for the position. Sinden selected former player John Ferguson as his assistant coach, after initially trying to recruit Ferguson as a player.

The Soviets selected Vsevolod Bobrov as the coach for the series. Bobrov was a former player who had played against Canada in the 1950s and later managed the Soviet national soccer team and the Moscow Spartak ice hockey team. Bobrov had been given the job as the Soviets' national ice hockey team coach, replacing long-time coach Anatoly Tarasov after the 1972 Winter Olympics. This was his second international assignment; his first was the 1972 World Championship, where Czechoslovakia had defeated the Soviet Union, ending a run of nine consecutive championships by the Soviets.

The Canadian team would be known as Team Canada for the first time. The name and sweater design was done by advertising agency Vickers and Benson. Eagleson wanted to call the team the "NHL All-Stars", but the agency convinced Eagleson otherwise, as the teams were from the USSR and Canada. The name Team Canada was inspired by the contemporary auto-racing team Team McLaren. The name is attributed to copy writer Terry Hill, whose first choice "The Dream Team" was rejected. The design of the sweater by designer John Lloyd utilized an enormous stylized maple leaf, like the Canadian flag, that covers the front. No numbers were on the sleeves, only on the back with the wording "CANADA" above the number. The sweater used only two colours: red and white, the maple leaf, numbers and letters in one colour and the rest of the sweater the other. The name, sweater design and a team song were all prepared in 24 hours, in time for a previously scheduled news conference. The series itself was simply known at the time as the Canada-USSR Series, although the name "Friendship Series" had been suggested by the Government of Canada Ministry of Foreign Affairs.

== Preparation ==
Along with coaching, Harry Sinden was given the task of selecting Team Canada, which would be the first true "team" composed of NHL all-stars. When Sinden announced the list of 35 Canadian players on July 12, one of the conditions of playing was revealed: players would have to have a signed NHL contract by August 13. His list of players included Bobby Hull, who by that time had already signed with the rival World Hockey Association (WHA) league. Three other players Sinden named—Gerry Cheevers, Derek Sanderson and J. C. Tremblay—had not yet signed with the WHA, but would do so and become ineligible. The condition had been negotiated between the NHL and Hockey Canada, and the NHL would not relent. The condition was widely criticized, including by the NHL's own Harold Ballard, the Toronto Maple Leafs owner and a harsh opponent of the WHA. Ballard felt that the series was the "unofficial world series of hockey and we want to win". Phil Reimer, a governor of Hockey Canada, resigned over the matter. Prime Minister Pierre Trudeau made a personal appeal, but Doug Fisher, chairman of Hockey Canada, refused to re-open the agreement between the NHL and Hockey Canada.

Prior to training camp, there were several changes in the roster. Jacques Laperrière withdrew and Guy Lapointe was selected as his replacement. Dennis Hull, brother of Bobby, considered turning down his invitation, but accepted because Bobby wished him to. Cheevers was replaced by his Boston teammate Eddie Johnston. Stan Mikita replaced Sanderson. Rick Martin replaced Bobby Hull. Bobby Orr, who had been selected although he was injured, remained with the team during the series and practiced with them, but did not play in any games.

Team Canada assembled in Toronto and started training camp on August 13. Sinden named four alternate captains: Esposito, Mikita, Frank Mahovlich and Jean Ratelle. The team trained for three weeks in Toronto and arrived in Montreal on August 31 for the first game. The team held a practice on September 1 at the Montreal Forum. The unheralded line of Bobby Clarke, Ron Ellis and Paul Henderson impressed in camp, enough to earn a place in the starting lineup for game one.

The Soviets named 31 players for its roster on August 11. The roster included four goaltenders, led by 20-year-old Vladislav Tretiak, Olympic and two-time world champion. The defence was led by Alexander Ragulin, who had played in three Olympics and nine world championships. The team was a veteran team with only a handful of players to make their national team debut. Several players were named provisionally, depending on their performance in the Sovietsky Sport tournament being held during August. Boris Kulagin, coach of Krylia Sovietov, was named the assistant coach. Among the forwards, the team did not name Anatoli Firsov, regarded as the "Bobby Hull" of the Soviets, who had reportedly spoken out against his new coach. Most of the players named were from the Soviet "Red Army" team HC CSKA Moscow, the team managed by former national coach Tarasov.

Along with their regular training, Bobrov had the Soviet players take boxing lessons in preparation for the series. The Soviets arrived in Montreal not long before the series, on August 30. Staying at Montreal's Queen Elizabeth Hotel, the team began two-a-day workouts at the St. Laurent Arena the next day. They were already acclimatized to the time zone as the team had been training on Montreal time for two weeks before travelling there. They brought 15 forwards, nine defencemen and three goaltenders. Veteran defenceman Vitali Davydov did not accompany the team to Canada. The reason given was injury, but the media questioned if Davydov had fallen out of favour with Bobrov. Firsov was reported as having a knee injury to explain his omission from the team.

During the pre-series period, two observers of the opposing team were allowed to scout the teams. Toronto Maple Leafs' coach John McLellan and Bob Davidson, the Leafs' head scout went to the Soviet Union to observe the Soviets in the Sovietsky Sport tournament. McLellan and Davidson observed two games, while Kulagin, along with Arkadi Chernyshev, a former assistant to Tarasov, observed all of the Canadians' practices in Toronto.

Bobby Orr of Team Canada observed the Soviets practice before the series. According to Orr, it was a "con job". The Soviets stumbled through their practices and used inadequate equipment. "I saw them at the Forum in Montreal last week and I felt sorry for them. Their lousy skates, stumbling over the blue line, fanning on shots. We were going to beat them so bad I felt sorry for them. What a con job."

While the Soviet team was in Canada, Rick Noonan, a trainer for the University of British Columbia’s sports teams, was assigned by Hockey Canada to assist the Soviets. Noonan, who would be later be named general manager of Team Canada for the 1980 Winter Olympics, was the only Canadian to have regular access to the Soviets' locker room, and he was behind the Soviets' bench during the first four games of the Summit Series.

== Expectations ==
At the time, the National Hockey League was considered to be where the best hockey players played, and its best players consisted largely of Canadians. The public consensus of hockey pundits and fans in North America was that other countries, the Soviets in this case, were simply no match for Canada's best. The Soviets were not expected to even give the Canadians a challenge, and Canada was going into this series expected to win handily. Sinden opined, "Canada is first in the world in two things: hockey and wheat." Alan Eagleson said, "We gotta win in eight games. Anything less than an unblemished sweep of the Russians would bring shame down on the heads of the players and the national pride." Vladislav Tretiak recalled: "The Canadians said that they were professionals, and amateurs played in Europe. Tarasov had been calling them to face off for a long time. But NHL responded: "Why do we need this? We will beat you with a double-digit score, we will kill everyone so that in the second period there will be no one on the court. Have you become amateur champions again? So study there, you have nothing to play with us."

Yvan Cournoyer remembered: "Everyone told us: don't worry, you'll beat them easily. We trained half-heartedly, so we didn't prepare for the upcoming meetings in the best way." At the same time, Phil Esposito perceived the upcoming series as "a real fight — capitalism against communism: "Do you know how we hated the damn communists? We had no right to lose. I didn't want to know the Russians. They were against our way of life, against private property." Soviet hockey players, also feeling responsible for the country, did not hate Canadians. They downplayed themselves, stating that they were in the Series to learn.

In a poll of experts conducted by The Hockey News, not one expected the Soviets to win a single game. Journalist Dick Beddoes of Toronto's The Globe and Mail offered to eat his words "shredded at high noon in a bowl of borscht on the steps of the Russian Embassy" if the Soviets won one game. Canadian journalists Milt Dunnell (Toronto Star), Jim Coleman (Southam), and Claude Larochelle (Le Soleil) predicted results of seven wins for Canada to one for the Soviets. American journalists Gerald Eskenazi (The New York Times) and Francis Rosa (Boston Globe) predicted eight wins to none, while Mark Mulvoy (Sports Illustrated) predicted seven wins to one for Canada.

Before the first game, former Canadiens' star goaltender Jacques Plante gave Soviet goaltender Tretiak advice on how to play the NHL forwards (losing the fact that Tretyak didn't speak English). Plante did this because he was "thinking of the humiliation he was almost certain to suffer". Plante himself predicted Canada would win "eight straight". In a game scouted by Team Canada, Tretiak had given up eight goals in a game played the day before his wedding.

A few Canadians gave a dissenting prognosis of the series. John Robertson of the Montreal Star warned that Team Canada was too poorly prepared and out of shape to win the series. He blamed the NHL: "This, the most important hockey event of our time, has been tacked onto the front of the NHL season as something only tolerated by the owners, and endorsed by the players as a means of enriching their pension plan." Former professional player Billy Harris who had coached Sweden's national team earlier in the year, predicted a Soviets' win, largely on the strength of Tretiak's goaltending. Former Canadian national team coach David Bauer also warned about the quality of the Soviets skating and their team play.

Prior to the series, Bobrov held a press luncheon in Moscow. He refused to consider that either team would sweep the series. To him, Team Canada had "the fire power, know-how and goaltending", but how would it adapt to international rules, two-referee system and amateur officials? He conceded that Phil Esposito would "be difficult to move from the front of the net. I expect there will be some surprises for us when we meet your Canadian stars." He also predicted that Valeri Kharlamov "will stand out, even against your best Canadians. By North American standards, he is small but he has an excellent shot. I think he will be effective." Sinden was aware of Kharlamov and he selected Ron Ellis to the Team Canada roster especially to cover Kharlamov.

== The series ==
=== Game one ===
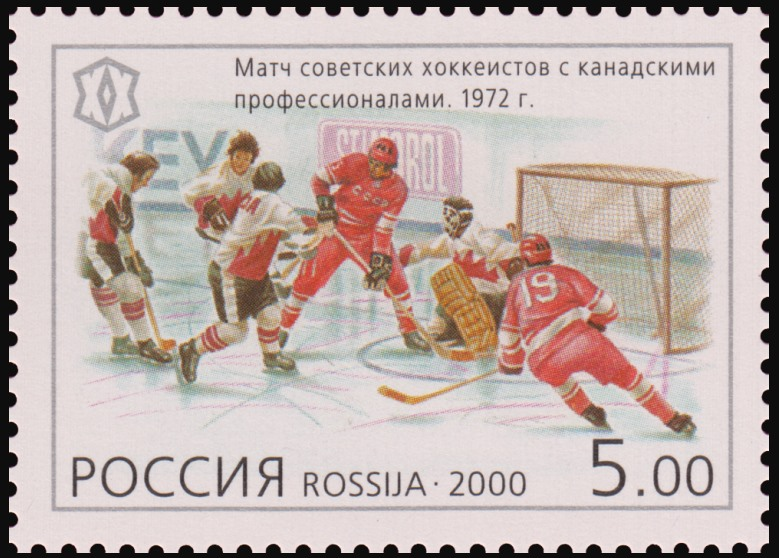
post stamp Soviet players match with Canadian professionals (1972).

Game one was held in Montreal in a very warm Montreal Forum on September 2 before 18,818 fans. The gamesmanship between the teams started before the opening puck drop. Canada was assigned the home team for all games in Canada, while the Soviets would be the home team in Moscow. The Soviets would not release their lineup until they had seen their opponents', which was the opposite order, considering they were the visitors. The official scorer had to return to the Soviets' dressing room and demand the lineup. Sinden wanted to put the Ellis-Clarke-Henderson line on against Valeri Kharlamov's line. The Soviets did not start Kharlamov's line and Sinden named Phil Esposito's line for the opening faceoff.

The move paid off as Esposito scored for Canada after just 30 seconds of play, knocking a puck out of the air behind Tretiak. But even after a few minutes, Sinden felt the Soviets were coming on and having no difficulty getting through Canada's defence. Henderson scored after six minutes to give Canada a two-goal lead on a faceoff win by Clarke (the only advantage that Team Canada had, in Sinden's estimation). To the Canadian spectators and media, the second goal gave the appearance that the pre-series predictions of a rout were being proven correct. But the Soviets got over any awe of the NHLers and scored twice to tie the game 2–2 before the end of the first period. Yevgeni Zimin scored on a pass from behind the net, and Vladimir Petrov scored a shorthanded goal on a Soviet 2-on-1 break, with Petrov potting the rebound after an initial Dryden save. According to Sinden, the Canadian players had lost their poise, "running all over the ice" trying to establish their hitting game, while the Soviets used an unexpected tactic, the long pass, to break a man out of their defensive zone. The Canadian defence was also dropping to the ice to block shots, while the Soviets simply skated around them to get a closer shot. Although Tretiak had given up two goals on Canada's first two shots, he recovered later in the period to make two critical saves off Esposito at point-blank range. According to Esposito, "at Christmas time, it would have been 4–0 for us."

In the second period, Kharlamov scored on a great individual effort to put the Soviets ahead 3–2. Kharlamov deked Don Awrey, skated around him, faked a backhand shot on goaltender Ken Dryden, then scored on the forehand. Kharlamov then scored a second goal to give the Soviets a two-goal lead at the end of the second period. During the period, the air temperature in the Forum (which had no air conditioning system) increased. By the end of the second period, the temperature in the Forum had reached 115 °F (46 °C).

For the third period, Sinden benched Awrey and the Jean Ratelle line, going with just three lines. In the third, Clarke scored to bring Canada within one. In the Canadians' attempt to tie the game, Yvan Cournoyer put a puck off the post, but the Soviets broke out afterwards and Boris Mikhailov scored on the counterattack to restore their two-goal lead with six minutes to play. Mikhailov skated across the Canadian net about 20 feet out, lured Dryden away from the goal crease, then back-handed the puck between the goalie's legs into the net. The strategy of three lines, combined with the heat in the arena, had left the Canadians exhausted, and the Soviets scored twice in the final minutes to finish with a 7–3 victory.

"I was stunned by their performance" was Sinden's assessment. Former Montreal Canadiens' coach Claude Ruel commented that the Soviets' forwards were one of the most finely honed units he had ever seen. "They are always moving, never standing around, they head-man the puck as well as anyone has ever done—and they always seem to be in the right place." According to Dryden: "We didn't play our game at all. After they tied it up, we started playing a panic type of game. Sometimes there were five men going for the puck at once." At the end of the game, Team Canada accidentally snubbed the Soviets by returning to the dressing room directly without shaking hands with the Soviets.

The win by the USSR team was celebrated into the early hours back home, and many took the next day off work. Valeri Kharlamov's father Boris held an impromptu party at his Moscow apartment. Dick Beddoes fulfilled his promise - he came to a hotel in Toronto, where Soviet hockey players lived, and ate a printed copy of his column after covering it with borscht.

=== Game two ===
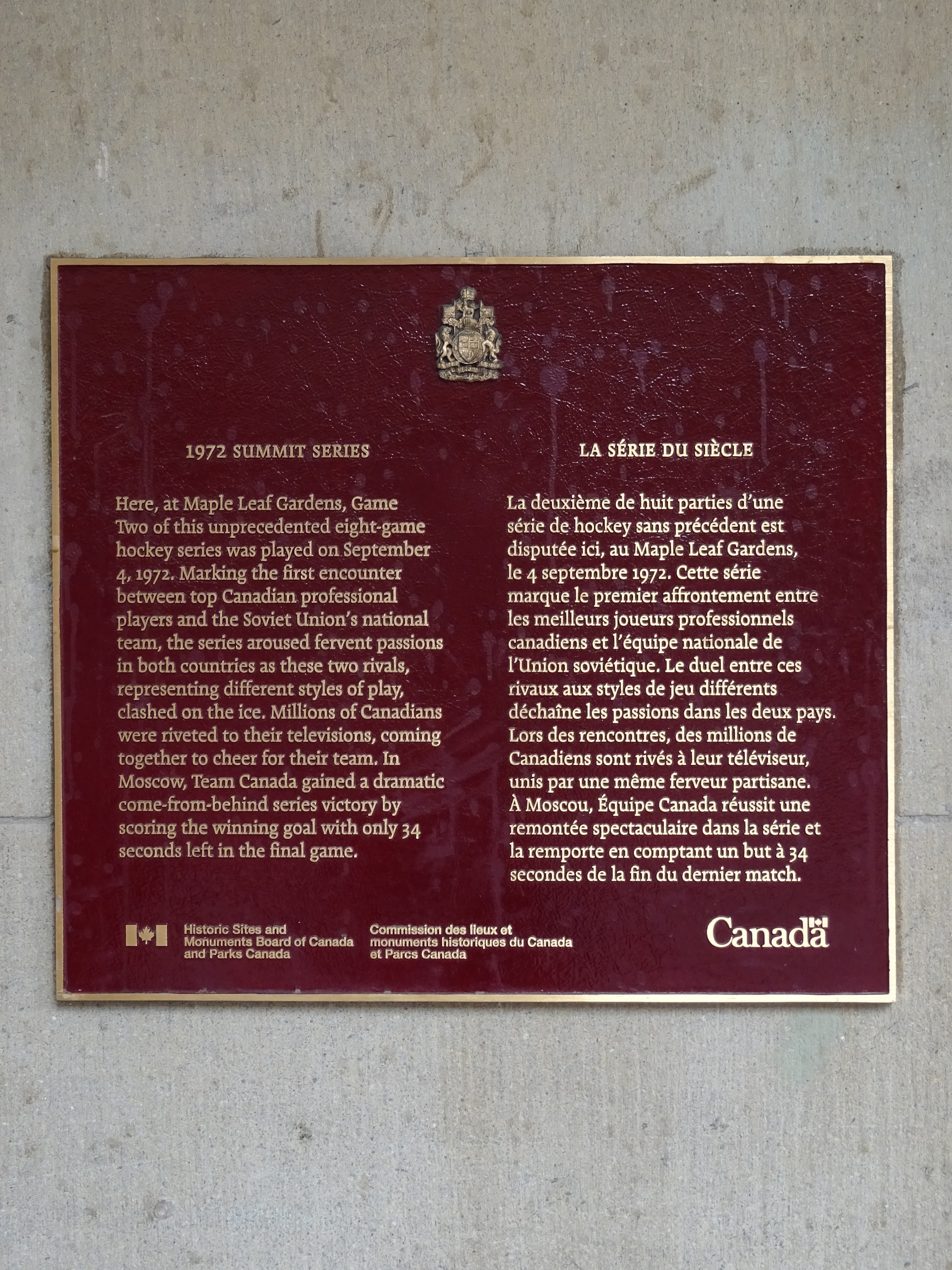
A historic plaque at Mattamy Athletic Centre on the Summit Series and game two at Maple Leaf Gardens.

The second game was played at Maple Leaf Gardens in Toronto on September 4. Sinden scratched several players from the first game, including Dryden, Awrey, Ratelle, Red Berenson, Rod Gilbert, Vic Hadfield, Mickey Redmond and Rod Seiling. Hadfield took the scratch hard, as he was from the Toronto area and felt he was being embarrassed in front of his hometown. On defence, Serge Savard, Pat Stapleton and Bill White were added, as were forwards Mikita, Wayne Cashman and J. P. Parisé. Tony Esposito, Phil's brother, took over goaltending duties. Sinden's changes were made to get "the diggers into the game and try to grind the Russians down. We had went for speed and quickness in our first lineup, yet the Russians were still faster and quicker."

Team Canada responded to their previous defeat with stronger play in this game. The first period was scoreless, but the Canadians used the period to intimidate the Soviets with hard body checking, especially from Cashman, Gary Bergman, Peter Mahovlich and Parisé, to throw the Soviets off their game. In the second period, Esposito again scored the first goal of the game, this time from a feed from his regular Boston Bruins' linemate Cashman, who had retrieved the puck deep in the Soviets' zone after colliding with USSR defenceman Vladimir Lutchenko. In the third period, Yvan Cournoyer wheeled around Alexander Ragulin and beat Tretiak to give Canada a 2–0 lead. Yakushev got the Soviets on the board after teammate Yevgeni Zimin missed on a breakaway. Yuri Lyapkin pounced on the rebound and fed it out front for Alexander Yakushev to bury the puck behind Esposito. Peter Mahovlich then scored a critical shorthanded goal, deking out the Soviet defender one-on-one, then Tretiak, to again give Canada a two-goal lead. His brother Frank then finished the scoring on a feed from Mikita, who had circled around a Soviet defenceman. Team Canada's 4–1 win tied the series at one game apiece.

The Soviet coaches blamed the loss on the officiating. Bobrov complained that the pair of American referees, Frank Larsen and Steve Dowling, let the Canadians get away with everything. After the game, the head of the USSR Hockey Federation, Andrei Starovoytov, charged the door of the officials' dressing room and kicked chairs over, exclaiming: "American referees allowed Canadian hockey players to act like a gang of outlaws." The two referees, scheduled to work game four in Vancouver, were replaced by the pair who had refereed games one and three, Gord Lee and Len Gagnon. Team Canada agreed to the Soviets' request to change referees, apparently not aware of Starovoytov's tantrum after game two.

=== Game three ===
Game three was played in the Winnipeg Arena on September 6. After the second game, the Soviets said that they had strayed into playing too much of the Canadian style, as individuals, and promised to return to their team style for the third game. Canada went with the same lineup as game two, with the exception of Ratelle replacing Bill Goldsworthy. Team Canada held leads of 3–1 and 4–2, but the Soviets rallied and the game ended in a 4–4 tie.

Canada took the lead only 1:54 into the game on a goal by Parisé, but Petrov replied shorthanded at 3:16 to tie. Petrov stole the puck from Frank Mahovlich for a breakaway and deked Tony Esposito to score. After a strong forecheck by the Canadians in the Soviets' zone, Ratelle scored off a turnover to put Canada ahead 2–1 after the first. In the second period, Wayne Cashman dug the puck out of a scrum in the corner to feed the puck to Phil Esposito, who scored to put Canada ahead 3–1. But on another Canadian power play, Kharlamov circled behind the Canadian defence and gathered a breakaway pass, then beat Tony Esposito to score the Soviets' second shorthanded goal. Paul Henderson scored unassisted seconds later to restore Canada's two-goal lead. However, the Soviets' "Youngster's Line" of Yuri Lebedev, Vyacheslav Anisin and Alexander Bodunov scored twice to tie the game at 4–4 after two periods. The third period was scoreless, creating what would prove to be the only tie of the eight-game series (there was no provision for overtime).

Team Canada assistant coach John Ferguson felt that the Canadians had gotten overconfident. "I was fooled again. I felt that after we had taken a 3–1 lead, the final score might be something like 7–1. But those two shorthanded goals. When you score one shorthanded goal it can turn it all around. But two? That's almost fatal." According to Tim Burke of the Montreal Gazette, both goaltenders, Tony Esposito and Vladislav Tretiak, reached great heights, or the outcome could have been 10–10. Tretiak was making an unexpected start for the Soviets, who had planned to start Viktor Zinger, but he was reported to be ill before the game. Soviet coach Bobrov complained about the officiating and the play of Wayne Cashman, stating that "if that game had been played in Europe, he would have spent the whole game in the penalty box."

=== Game four ===
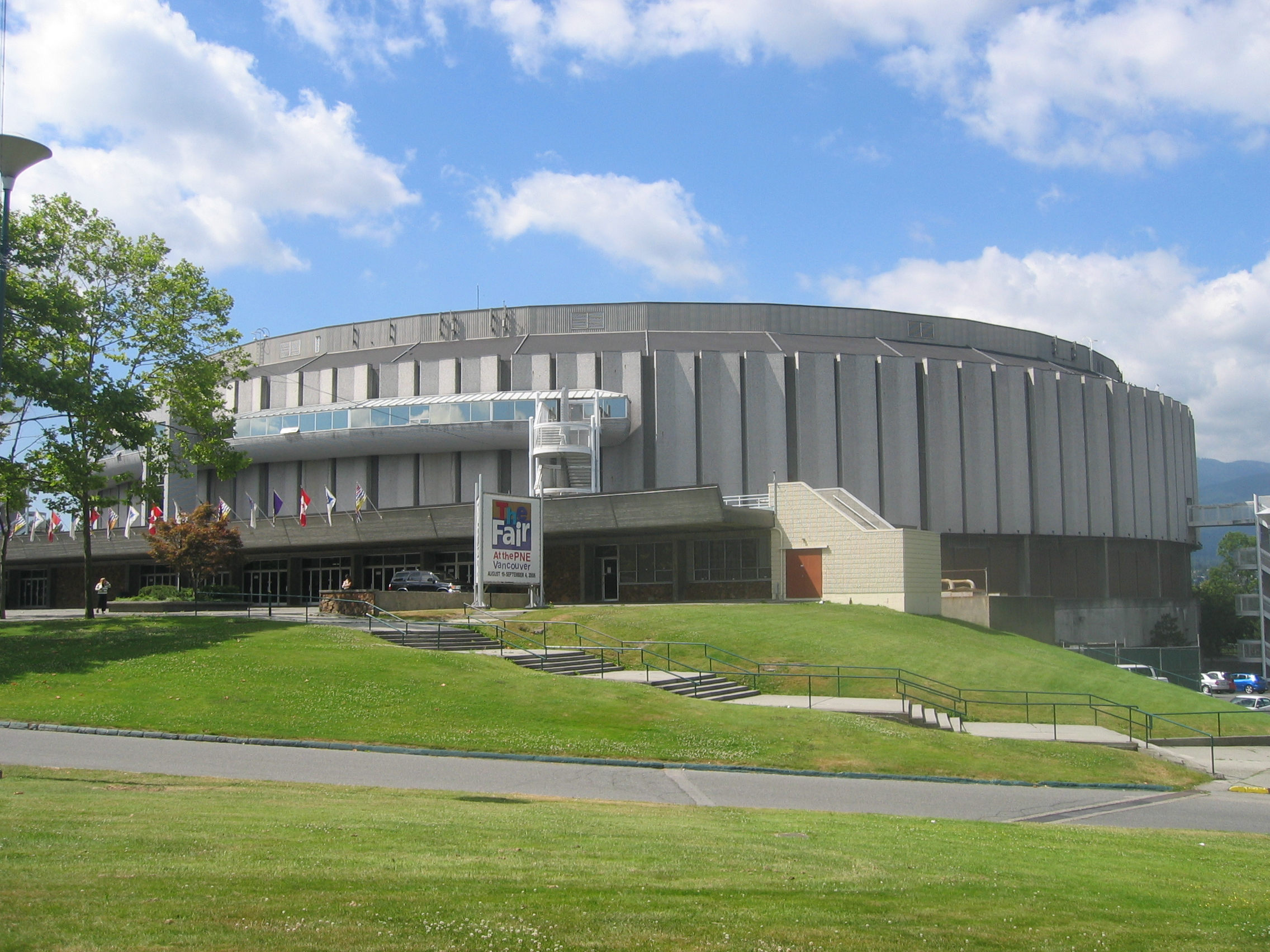
Pacific Coliseum in Vancouver in 2006. The fourth game of the series was held at the arena.

Game four was played in Vancouver at the Pacific Coliseum. The game started with two consecutive penalties by Bill Goldsworthy, and Boris Mikhailov converted both into power play goals to give the Soviets a 2–0 lead. Goldsworthy, starting in place of Cashman, was trying to counter his teammate's truculence, but only ended up hurting his team and was criticized privately by Sinden. In the second, Gilbert Perreault scored when a Soviet deflected his shot past Tretiak, but Blinov scored less than a minute later to restore the two-goal lead. Rod Gilbert scored a questionable goal that was disallowed, and Canada's protests went unheeded. To Sinden, that was the turning point of the game, and the result could have been different had the goal been allowed, although Sinden admitted that it was "a beating". Vikulov scored to put the Soviets ahead 4–1 after two periods. In the third, Goldsworthy made partial amends with a goal to get Canada to within 4–2, but then Shadrin scored to put the game out of reach. Dennis Hull scored a too-little, too-late goal in the final minute.

All the Canadian goals were scored by players Sinden had inserted in place of players who had played in Winnipeg. Still, Sinden felt that changing the lineup had been a mistake. According to Sinden, Ken Dryden, who had replaced Tony Esposito in goal, did not have a good game; he was shaky and Tretiak was great. According to Conacher, the Soviets used cross-ice passing in the attacking zone, a tactic that caused problems for Dryden. Serge Savard missed the game after fracturing his ankle in practice.

Team Canada was booed off the ice at the end of what was the final game of the series played in Canada. Responding to the negative public and media reaction in light of the expectation for an overwhelming Team Canada sweep of the series, Phil Esposito made an emotional outburst in a post-game interview:

To the people across Canada, we tried, we gave it our best, and to the people that boo us, geez, I'm really, all of us guys are really disheartened and we're disillusioned, and we're disappointed at some of the people. We cannot believe the bad press we've got, the booing we've gotten in our own buildings. If the Russians boo their players, the fans ... Russians boo their players ... Some of the Canadian fans—I'm not saying all of them, some of them booed us, then I'll come back and I'll apologize to each one of the Canadians, but I don't think they will. I'm really, really ... I'm really disappointed. I am completely disappointed. I cannot believe it. Some of our guys are really, really down in the dumps, we know, we're trying like hell. I mean, we're doing the best we can, and they got a good team, and let's face facts. But it doesn't mean that we're not giving it our 150%, because we certainly are. I mean, the more – everyone of us guys, 35 guys that came out and played for Team Canada. We did it because we love our country, and not for any other reason, no other reason. They can throw the money, uh, for the pension fund out the window. They can throw anything they want out the window. We came because we love Canada. And even though we play in the United States, and we earn money in the United States, Canada is still our home, and that's the only reason we come. And I don't think it's fair that we should be booed.

— Phil Esposito, in a post-game interview on national television

Brad Park and Frank Mahovlich also criticized the booing. According to Park: "We get nothing—not a dime for this. Brother, I'm sick". Other players were more sanguine. Dryden didn't lash out at the fans. "I'm disappointed, but I can understand it. The fans wanted us to do real good, and they're frustrated we didn't. I didn't think I deserved to be booed. Tretiak frustrated us, but I guess I didn't frustrate them enough."

After the fourth game, the series went on a two-week hiatus. The Soviets returned home and played in a domestic tournament. The Canadians took a few days off, then travelled to Sweden for a pair of exhibition games before arriving in Moscow.

=== Game five ===
Team Canada arrived in Moscow for the final four games at the Luzhniki Ice Palace, accompanied by 3,000 Canadian fans. Not long after starting practices in Moscow, Team Canada players Vic Hadfield, Rick Martin and Jocelyn Guevremont left the team and went home for what they felt was a lack of playing time. Team Canada used its practice time in the Dvoretz Sporta to learn the differences of the Soviet rinks. While there had been concern about the wider ice surface, what was most strange to the Canadian players was the fish netting draped at the ends of the rink above the boards instead of glass. Considered "in play", the netting was strung tight, and a slap shot to the netting could catapult the puck back as fast as the original shot.

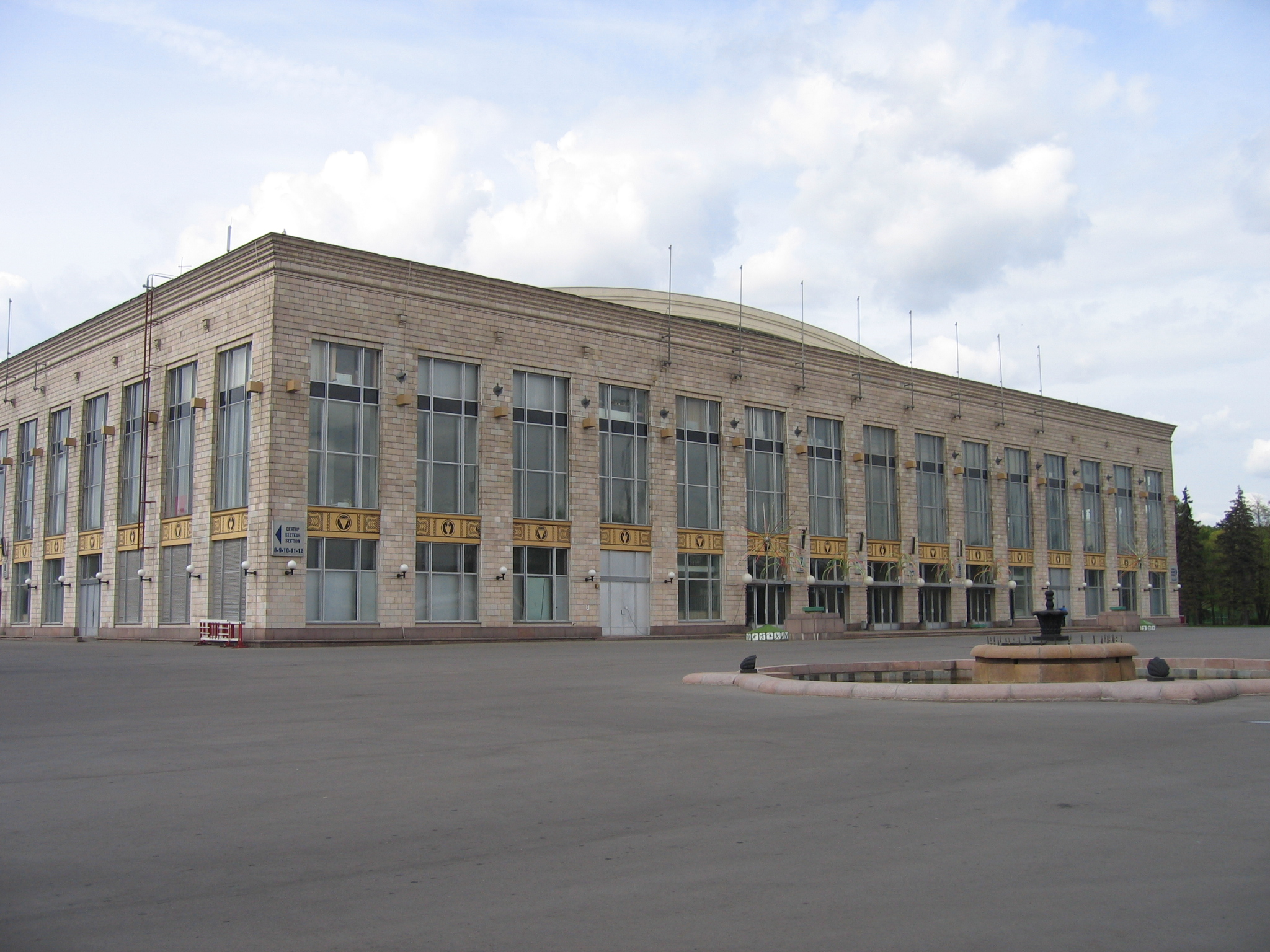
Luzhniki Palace of Sports in Moscow in 2007. The arena hosted games five to eight of the series.

Game five was held on September 22. Luzhniki was filled to its 14,000 capacity, including Communist Party General Secretary Leonid Brezhnev, Soviet Premier Alexei Kosygin and Soviet head of state Nikolai Podgorny and a large contingent of military in dress uniform. The 3,000 Canadian fans were given seats, but a group of 150 Canadian sports figures were left unseated. The players marched out to the rink for the game to loud cheers, accompanied by the song "No Coward Plays Hockey". During the pregame introductions, Jean Ratelle, captain for the night, was given the traditional gift of bread and salt. The players were all given red and white carnations. Phil Esposito was given flowers, but he slipped and fell on a flower stem, landing on his back. Esposito recovered to laugh at his pratfall, and bowed to the delight of all of the spectators.

Parisé scored the only goal of the first period, and Clarke and Henderson scored in the second to give Canada a 3–0 lead. In the third, Yury Blinov scored for the Soviets at 3:34 and Henderson scored at 4:56 to make it a 4-1 Canada lead. At 9:05, Anisin scored on a deflection to start a run of four straight Soviet goals. Vladimir Vikulov's goal at 14:46 was the game-winner for the USSR, whose 5–4 victory gave them a 3–1–1 series lead. According to Bobby Clarke, "we're not a defensive club, yet we tried to play defensively."

Despite the loss, all the Canadian fans in the arena sang "O Canada" as Team Canada left the ice. The cheering of the Canadian fans was unknown at Soviet hockey games. The Soviet newspaper Pravda noted wryly that the roof of the arena had withstood the loudness of the cheering and had remained in place.

Team Canada was now faced with the daunting task of having to win all three remaining games to win the series. To add to the Canadian struggles, Gilbert Perreault left Team Canada for home to focus on getting into shape for the upcoming NHL season. Perreault had played in game five, practiced with the team the day after, and then asked to return home.

Alexander Yakushev recalled: "After this difficult victory, we decided that everything was done, it was enough to win one match out of three. No one doubted that we would succeed."

=== Game six ===
Game six produced a vital Canadian 3–2 victory. After a scoreless first period, Lyapkin scored the first goal at 1:12 of the second, but the Canadians' confidence did not waver. The Canadians caught the Soviets in a lapse and scored three goals in a one-and-a-half-minute span to take a 3–1 lead. Hull flipped a rebound over Tretiak to tie the score after Gilbert had capitalized on a Soviet giveaway. Cournoyer scored on a setup from behind the net by Berenson. Fifteen seconds later, Henderson scored what turned out to be the winning third goal on a 30-foot slap shot. Yakushev scored late in the second on a power play to finish the scoring. At the end of the second period, Kharlamov seemed to level the position, but the judges did not count the goal, declaring that the puck hit the post.

According to Dryden, after the second period the Canadians had a wild conversation in the locker room. They understood that they were losing control of themselves and that this threatened defeat. For psychological reasons, Sinden kept the players in the locker room for five minutes longer than expected before the start of the third period.

According to Montreal Gazette sports editor Ted Blackman, Canadian players Ken Dryden and Brad Park turned in their first big games of the series. Dryden ended a personal losing streak to Soviet teams dating back to his amateur career and two previous games in the series. In his opinion, the Canadian penalty-killing unit of Serge Savard, Peter Mahovlich, Bill White and Pat Stapleton was "brilliant" as it held the Soviets to one power play goal despite a wide disadvantage in penalty minutes. Savard himself was recovering from a fractured ankle during the series. According to commentator Brian Conacher, Team Canada had adjusted its game to not play "dump and chase" but instead retain possession in the offensive zone. The strategy led directly to Henderson's winning goal on an interception of an errant Soviet pass. According to Conacher, "for the first time, the Soviets had opened the door a crack and Team Canada had rushed through like a freight train."

Following the game, the Canadians complained that Josef Kompalla and Franz Baader, the German referees (the same who refereed a controversial Canada-Sweden game), were biased, since Canada was assessed 31 minutes in penalties while the Soviets received only four minutes. Phil Esposito complained that one goal by the Soviets was directly the result of the referee dropping the puck while he was talking to a teammate. The Canadians gave the pair the nickname of "Badder and Worse".

==== The Slash ====
During game six, Valeri Kharlamov was targeted by Team Canada for attention. According to Conacher, "every time they get a chance, they're taking him for a rough ride along the boards." Kharlamov was the target of numerous body checks by Brad Park. Things started to heat up in the second period. Kharlamov had knocked down Bobby Clarke, who in retaliation rubbed Kharlamov's face with his glove to raise Kharlamov's temper, and the two exchanged punches. Bergman then stepped in and bumped into Kharlamov and harassed him all the way back to the bench. Peter Mahovlich later elbowed Kharlamov, who retaliated by dumping Mahovlich to the ice. Later, Clarke raced down the ice to catch a streaking Kharlamov and deliberately slashed Kharlamov's already sore ankle, injuring it and according to reports, fracturing it. Kharlamov skated over to the Canadians' bench and yelled at them before limping off the ice to the dressing room. The referees handed Clarke a minor penalty for slashing and an additional 10-minute misconduct penalty. Later, with Clarke still serving the misconduct, the referees also gave Dennis Hull a slashing penalty, during which Yakushev scored. Despite his injured ankle, Kharlamov returned to play and very nearly scored on a power play later in the second period. The Soviets' Mikhailov exacted his own retribution, kicking Bergman hard enough to cut his leg through his shin pads.

The incident was widely reported and condemned by the Soviet press. Kharlamov himself believed that "Bobby Clarke was given the job of taking me out of the game." The slash was apparently done at the instigation of assistant coach John Ferguson. "I remember that Kharlamov's ankle was hurting pretty bad. I called Clarke over to the bench, looked over at Kharlamov and said, 'I think he needs a tap on the ankle.' I didn't think twice about it. It was Us versus Them. And Kharlamov was killing us. I mean, somebody had to do it." Dick Beddoes asked Clarke about it later at a team reunion, calling it a "wicked two-hander", to which Clarke replied "Dick, if I hadn't learned how to lay on a two-hander once in a while, I'd never have left Flin Flon."

In a 2006 interview with the Russian Sport Express magazine, Clarke stated that he was unaware of Kharlamov's sore ankle at the time and does not recall Ferguson telling him to target the ankle. Further, he recalled that Kharlamov had used stick work on him, and Clarke's slash was in retribution for Kharlamov's actions:

We were going for the puck together, he pushed me with the stick, then turned around and skated away. I caught up with him and hit him on the leg, not thinking at all where and how I hit. I could hit them on the leg, but don't forget that they did the same things to me. I am all for fairness, so the players who play tough hockey have to be prepared to get the same thing back. And I was ready for that. Soviet hockey had no fights so the players used other methods to get the point across. Like a little bit of 'stick work' here and there, you know. And I personally don't mind this. I am a tough player and I respect toughness in others. But if I am poked with a stick I will do the same. We just had to adapt to the new ways of doing things, that's all.

— Bobby Clarke, in a 2006 interview with Sport Express magazine

On the 30th anniversary of the series, Henderson called the incident "the low point of the series", but would later apologize to Clarke. In his 2007 book, Conacher wrote that "from the broadcast booth I was shocked and disgusted when I saw Clarke viciously chop at Kharlamov's left ankle." He noted "that emotionally these games had clearly gone beyond sport for Team Canada and had truly become unrestricted war on ice." Media opinion is divided on the effect it had on the outcome of the series. The controversy and admissions that have come forth throughout the years have led some to the belief that the incident could be considered a form of cheating. Kharlamov, who had been one of the Soviets' best forwards, missed game seven, when the Soviets could have clinched the series and while he did play in game eight, he was not at 100% and did not score. In Clarke's opinion, there were other factors for Team Canada's turnaround in Moscow: "In Moscow we played much better than in Canada. We were almost equal to the Soviet team physically by then, we passed much better, we shot the puck much better, we became faster and played better on defence. Besides, when you have nothing to lose, it is easier to play. And after the fifth game we had nothing to lose."

=== Game seven ===
Czech referee Rudolf Baťa and Swede referee Ove Dahlberg officiated the seventh game, and it was announced that the German referee pair of Josef Kompalla and Franz Baader had been sent home and Baťa and Dahlberg would referee the final game, in exchange for a promise that Bergman would not publicly berate Bobrov.

Harry Sinden described tactical training in this way: "Before the match, we made one significant rearrangement, which turned out to be very useful. During the last two games, the Russians did not miss Esposito, so he did not score goals. He was controlled by Petrov. Then we decided to outsmart them by playing four lines. We knew that our opponents were unlikely to break up their team to counter this."

Team Canada won game seven by a 4–3 score to even the series 3–3–1. In the first period, Phil Esposito scored two goals while Yakushev and Petrov tallied for the USSR, ending the first period tied 2–2. The second period was scoreless. In the third, Gilbert put Canada ahead, but Yakushev scored again to tie the score 3-3. At 17:54, Henderson fooled Soviet defender Tsygankov with a pass through the Soviet's feet, then skated around him to pick up the puck and break in on Tretiak. As Henderson shot and scored, Valeri Vasiliev tripped Henderson who did not see his shot go in. The goal light went on and off quickly and Team Canada rushed onto the ice to congratulate Henderson before there was any doubt raised about the goal. The Soviet coach Bobrov publicly blamed the loss on Tsygankov. After the game, Henderson commented about the goal as the "one that gave him his most personal satisfaction ever".

The game also featured a controversial incident. At 16:26 of the third period, a scuffle broke out between Canada's Bergman and the USSR's Mikhailov, in which Mikhailov tried to kick Bergman twice.

=== Game eight ===
Controversy ensued when the Soviets wanted to back out of the refereeing agreement. The Soviets wanted to include the German pair of referees originally scheduled for the game. Eagleson threatened to pull Team Canada from playing the eighth game. In a compromise, Kompalla refereed along with Bata instead of Baader. The ill will spilled over into the presentation of a totem pole as a gift from Team Canada. The pre-game presentation was cancelled by the Soviets, but restored on the insistence of Team Canada. According to Sinden, Eagleson stated that they "were going to take this totem pole and bring it to centre ice and they'll have to take it or skate around it the whole game".

Heading into the eighth and final game, each team had three wins, three losses and one tie, but the Soviets were two goals ahead in goal differential. In Canada, much of the country enjoyed an unofficial 'half a day' holiday, with many students in Toronto being sent home the afternoon of the game (which began at 1 pm Eastern Time), while many others watched the game at work or school. In Montreal's Central Station, 5,000 fans gathered around ten TV sets to watch the game, which was simulcast in English on the Canadian Broadcasting Corporation (CBC) television network, the CTV Television Network, and in French on the TV Radio-Canada television network. Until the men's hockey gold medal game of the 2010 Winter Olympics, it was the most-watched sporting event in the history of Canadian television.

Team Canada took a number of questionable early penalties. With two Canadians (White and Peter Mahovlich) off, Yakushev scored to give the Soviets the lead 1–0. The game was delayed after a mistaken call against Parisé (he was called for interference, but Parisé admitted later he was guilty of cross-checking) and emotions boiled over. Parisé was called for a misconduct for banging his stick on the ice, and when he saw the misconduct called, he dashed across the ice with his stick raised. Parisé nearly swung his stick at Kompalla and got a match penalty. Sinden threw a chair on the ice. Some writers have commented that the incidents resulted in the rest of the game being refereed capably.

After Parisé's penalty was served, it was Canada's turn to go on the power play, and Esposito scored his sixth goal of the series to tie it at 1–1. The teams exchanged power plays before Lutchenko scored a power-play goal on a slap shot to put the Soviets ahead 2–1. Brad Park then scored his only goal of the series at even strength to complete some pretty passing between Dennis Hull and the Rangers' teammates of Ratelle, Gilbert and Park to tie the score. The period ended with the teams tied 2–2.

In the second, the Soviets started with a quick goal by Vladimir Shadrin after 21 seconds. The last ten minutes saw two goals from the Soviets: Yakushev scoring his seventh of the series followed by Valery Vasiliev on the power play to put the Soviets ahead 5–3 after two periods. White had countered for Canada midway through the period. It was one of few moments for Canada to cheer as the Soviets played an excellent period. The other was a goal-saving play by Phil Esposito who stopped a shot by Yury Blinov, who had faked goaltender Dryden out of position and had an empty net to shoot at. Esposito stopped the puck with his stick on the goal line. Blinov and the crowd had prematurely celebrated the apparent goal, and Blinov shook his head in disbelief.

Sinden told the players to "try to get one back quickly, but play tight defensively and not allow the game to get out of hand. Don't gamble until after the half-way point if need be." Esposito scored to put the Canadians within one. The tension rose at the rink, and extra soldiers were dispatched for security. It was matched on the ice as Gilbert and Yevgeni Mishakov had a fight. Veteran Canadian hockey commentator Foster Hewitt noticed that "You can feel the tension almost everywhere!"

At the ten-minute mark, Sinden noticed that the Soviets had changed their style, playing defensively to protect the lead rather than pressing. However, the strategy backfired on the Soviets. The change in tactics gave the Canadians more chances to score and Cournoyer scored to tie the game 5-5.

After the Cournoyer goal, the goal judge refused to put the goal light on despite the fact that it was signalled a goal on the ice. In response, Alan Eagleson (seated across the ice from the Team Canada bench) attempted to reach the timer's bench to protest, causing a ruckus in the crowd as he made his way there. As he was being subdued by the Soviet police, the Canadian players headed over and Peter Mahovlich jumped over the boards to confront the police with his stick. Eagleson was freed and escorted by the coaches across the ice to the bench. In anger, he shoved his fist to the Soviet crowd, as a few other Canadian supporters also gave the finger to the Soviets. Soviet commentator Nikolai Ozerov uttered a phrase that had become legendary: "We don't need such hockey!" (Russian: «Такой хоккей нам не нужен!», romanized: Takoy hokkey nam ne nuzhen!).

The Soviets continued to play defensively. Sinden speculates the Soviets were willing to accept the tie and win the series on goal differential.

==== The Goal ====
The famous photograph of Paul Henderson by Frank Lennon

In the final minute of play, with Phil Esposito, Yvan Cournoyer and Peter Mahovlich out on the ice, Paul Henderson stood up at the bench and called Mahovlich off the ice as he was skating by. "I jumped on the ice and rushed straight for their net. I had this strange feeling that I could score the winning goal", recalls Henderson. Bobby Clarke was supposed to replace Esposito, but Phil did not come off ("There was no way I was coming off the ice in that situation," Esposito said). Cournoyer picked up a puck that had been passed around the boards by the Soviets in a clearing attempt. He missed Henderson with a pass, but two Soviets mishandled the puck in the corner and Esposito shot the puck on Tretiak.

Henderson, who had fallen behind the net, got up and went to the front of the net, where he was uncovered. Henderson got the rebound of Esposito's shot, shot the puck and was stopped, but recovered the rebound. With Tretiak down, he put the puck past the goalie with only 34 seconds to play. Foster Hewitt's voice rose in excitement as he called the winning goal:

Cournoyer has it on that wing. Here's a shot. Henderson made a wild stab for it and fell. Here's another shot. Right in front, they score! Henderson has scored for Canada!

— Foster Hewitt, calling the play-by-play description of Henderson's goal."

The scene was captured on film by cameraman Frank Lennon. The picture became iconic in Canada. Canada held on to win the game and the series, four games to three with one tie. Pat Stapleton picked up the puck for a keepsake after the game.

Somewhat overshadowed by Henderson's winning goal was a four-point game by Phil Esposito, who tallied two goals and two assists and had a hand in all three goals of the third period. Esposito was the only player on either team to score four points in a game during the series. According to Ron Ellis, he had "never seen another player have a period where there was so much pressure and was still able to accomplish what he did". Sinden considered it to be Esposito's "finest hour". Esposito describes it as "there was no stopping me. And I think some of the guys got a little angry with me. If we had lost, I would have been the goat. But we didn't lose. I just had enough faith in myself, that I was going to get it done, one way or another."

The series ended with no ceremony. After a brief on-ice gathering of Canadian players and team officials, the opposing teams shook hands and skated off the ice. There was no trophy or prize money at stake, and the players received no medals, not even a commemorative token.

=== Aftermath ===
Team Canada arrived back in Canada on October 1. The team was mobbed by an estimated crowd of 10,000 at Montreal's Dorval Airport. Also greeting the team were Prime Minister Pierre Trudeau and City of Montreal Mayor Jean Drapeau. Montrealers Ken Dryden, Serge Savard, Yvan Cournoyer, Jean Ratelle and coach John Ferguson stayed in Montreal, while the rest of the team travelled on to Toronto. In Toronto, an estimated crowd of 80,000 attended a ceremony at Nathan Phillips Square to salute the players. The players were welcomed by Ontario Premier Bill Davis and Toronto Mayor William Dennison.

After the series, it was reported that NHL president Campbell and Chicago Black Hawks' owner Bill Wirtz had concluded an agreement with the Soviets for the Soviet national team to play an exhibition series in January 1973 against the Boston Bruins, New York Rangers and Chicago Black Hawks. Campbell characterized the reports as "presumptuous". The NHL and the Soviets had held talks during the Moscow games, during which the Soviets had requested further games, but Campbell stated "we don't even know if we could schedule such a series" and "we're a long way from any arrangement." Although the 1973 exhibition series did not take place, exhibition series would take place a few years later.

Kompalla gave an interview with newspaper General-Anzeiger after the series. "When I recall these matches, my flesh creeps. Ten more such games and I would age several years. I am very glad that I got back home uninjured." He went on to state that the Canadians played "very crudely, purposely using foul methods that endanger the lives of their rivals". He complained that the Canadian team threw "cucumbers and other leftovers" at his colleague Franz Baader on the flight from Moscow to Prague and harassed visitors in hotels. Bobby Hull also criticized Team Canada, stating that the fighting and gestures of the Canadian players "were a bad example to young players and diplomatically harmful".

The Soviet coaches Bobrov and Kulagin were interviewed after the series in Sovietsky Sport. They accused Team Canada of "trying several methods to intimidate their players, though this war of nerves did not bring them success". The coaches said they were astonished that the Canadians argued with the referees. They singled out Team Canada Assistant Coach John Ferguson for his "pugnacity". They did compliment Team Canada on their defensive skills, but felt that the Soviets were technically superior, and, but for some deplorable mistakes by their players, the Soviets would have won the series.

Alan Eagleson was not repentant for his actions during game eight. Eagleson was not the only one jostled by police; Eagleson's wife and the Canadian ambassador's wife were also jostled. Eagleson woke up with bruises from his treatment. Eagleson regretted the incident and planned to not get involved in further series. He did get a letter of support from Robert Ford, the ambassador, who basically agreed with Eagleson's actions. Mail and messages about the incident was mostly in favour of Eagleson. According to Ted Blackman, Canadian fans were basically understanding of Team Canada's actions as being provoked while the team was under duress.

=== Soviets' gamesmanship ===
As well as the disputes over the refereeing, the goal judges on several occasions did not turn on the red light indicating a goal after a Canadian score. After Henderson's goal in game seven, Sinden sent the entire team off the bench to ensure the goal was counted. A similar incident during game eight led to the melee that Eagleson was involved in.

During Team Canada's stay in Moscow, the team's treatment was the source of numerous complaints by the players. When leaving Sweden, the team was informed that the players would stay at one hotel, their wives at another. The players threatened not to go, and the arrangements were changed to keep the players and wives together at the Intourist Hotel. The players' wives were fed substandard food and the players would smuggle some of their food to their wives. The team had contracted to have Canadian beer and steaks delivered to them in Moscow. The beer was lost at the airport, while the steaks were cut in half. At a practice after game six, the Soviets tried to cut short the Canadians' practice.

During their stay in Moscow, the players visited Red Square, theatres, ballet, museums and the Kremlin, meeting with many ordinary Muscovites. According to Frank Mahovlich, in Canada, before leaving for the Soviet Union, the players were accompanied by a bunch of instructions that their hotel rooms would be full of listening devices. This gave rise to a famous anecdote about how Makhovlich unscrewed the fasteners of a huge chandelier in an Intourist's conference room.

== Other Team Canada games ==
=== Sweden ===
During the two-week hiatus between games four and five, the Canadians visited Sweden and played two exhibition games versus the Sweden national team. The Team Canada management had arranged for the visit to Sweden to get used to the bigger ice surfaces in Europe, and stopping in Sweden would provide some rest for Team Canada before resuming the series in Moscow. The games took place on September 16 and 17 at the Johanneshovs Isstadion arena in Stockholm. Canada won game one 4–1; the second game was a 4–4 tie. The first exhibition game introduced Canada to the two West German referees, Josef Kompalla and Franz Baader. These two referees would figure prominently in games six and eight of the Canada-Soviet Union series.

Sinden considered the first period of the first Swedish game the team's worst since the team was put together, but the team improved and started to take command. Henderson, Clarke, Cashman and Parisé scored. Sinden criticized the German referees: "... they were absolutely terrible. They couldn't even skate. They were miles behind the play all night and don't know the damn rules. Their incompetence helped the game become very bitter." The players were also introduced to the style of play of the Swedes, who were well used to using stick work to throw off their opponents. "They were spearing, holding, interfering, and most of all, backstabbing." The Canadian players would retaliate and be penalized for their retribution. As an example of the referees' incompetence, Sinden pointed out that Esposito had been penalized for cross-checking, and given a misconduct for it. Sinden, who had played international ice hockey, knew that under international rules at the time, you could not give a misconduct for cross-checking.

A dirty incident marred the second game. Cashman was cut in the mouth by Sweden's Ulf Sterner's stick. The cut to his tongue required nearly 50 stitches and forced him to miss the rest of the Summit Series, although he stayed with the team. Sterner was not penalized on the play. During the first intermission, Team Canada and Team Sweden scuffled in the runway to their dressing rooms before being separated by police. Canada took a 2–1 lead in the game, but the Swedes were not in awe of Canada like they had been at the beginning of game one. The Swedish tactics were effective; Canada took 31 minutes in penalties to Sweden's two. Sweden led the game 4–3 before Esposito scored on a 35-foot shot in the final minute. The Swedish defenceman had actually backed into their goaltender, allowing Esposito an easy shot for goal. Sinden also admitted that the tying goal was off-side but the referees had missed the call. Sinden was "thrilled with the tie. I wouldn't be able to stomach their gloating if they beat us."

Team Canada was heavily criticized by the Swedish media for its "criminal"-style play during the two games. Pictures in the newspapers highlighted the blood from a two-stitch cut the Swedish captain Lars-Erik Sjöberg had received on a cross-check from Vic Hadfield. Reports of the games led to criticism from back home in Canada, which incensed Sinden. The team cooled off the next day with a session in Södertälje playing for the employees of a Volkswagen plant. The team played mock games against local teams of youngsters 12 and 13 years in age. The practice improved the mood of the players. The team drank beer on the bus, and started "singing songs like a bunch of kids". Several of the players then went out drinking, impressing Sinden the next day with their best practice session to date. The time in Sweden helped bring Team Canada together as a team and focused them for the final four games.

=== Czechoslovakia ===
After the series, Team Canada played an exhibition game against the Czechoslovak national team; at the time, the world champions. The game took place on September 30 at the Sportovní hala in Prague and ended in a 3–3 tie. Canada took the lead in the first period on goals by Serge Savard and Peter Mahovlich. The Czechoslovak team tied it with two goals in the second by Bohuslav Stastny. Jiri Kochta scored at 2:28 of the third and the lead nearly held up until the end. Canada pulled its goalie and Savard scored his second goal with four seconds left.

For the game, Stan Mikita was named captain of the Canadian team. Mikita had left Czechoslovakia at age eight to live in Canada with an aunt and uncle, leaving behind his mother. During player introductions, Mikita received the largest ovation of any player. He took the opening faceoff and very nearly scored during the game.

== Broadcasting ==
The games' broadcasts were produced by Hockey Canada, using experienced hockey commentators from Canadian television networks. In English, CBC Television (CBC) and CTV Television Network (CTV) split the coverage, with CTV carrying games one, three, five, seven and eight, while CBC aired games two, four, six and eight. Foster Hewitt called the play-by-play and former player Brian Conacher was the colour commentator for all of the games. At the request of the broadcasters, Hewitt came out of semi-retirement to be part of the broadcast. In French, all games were broadcast on TV Radio-Canada and the broadcast team was Rene Lecavalier and former player Jacques Plante for the games played in Canada, and with SRC's Richard Garneau for the games played in Moscow - Garneau was already in Europe, having covered the 1972 Summer Olympics. For the eighth game, it was estimated that 16 million Canadians watched the match. (A year earlier, the national census had counted 21,963,000 Canadians.)

A partnership between Bobby Orr Enterprises and Harold Ballard bought the broadcast rights from Hockey Canada for CA$750,000. The bid, negotiated by Alan Eagleson, who, at the time, was both Orr's agent and a Hockey Canada director, outbid McLaren Advertising, producers of Hockey Night in Canada, which had offered $500,000. Ballard-Orr realized a profit on the series of CA$1.2 million.

Internationally, the series was broadcast in a total of 24 countries. In the US, the series was picked up by some television stations, such as WSNS (Channel 44) in Chicago. The telecasts of games one through four were produced by WSBK (Channel 38) in Boston and called by Bruins' announcers Fred Cusick and John Peirson. After efforts by WSBK to get rights to the four games in Moscow broke down, a last-minute deal by Boston public television station WGBH-TV allowed it to broadcast the CBC/CTV feed of games five through eight and to make the telecast available to PBS stations in several American cities, mostly those who had NHL, minor-league, or major college hockey teams. WGBH fed the Canadian telecasts; games six, seven, and eight were seen on WGBH and PBS on a tape-delay in prime-time.

The Soviet play-by-play was done by Nikolai Ozerov. In the style of that time, the Soviets did not televise anything during the pre-game, intermissions or post-game. During the intermission, the screen went black, with classical music playing quietly. After the games, the broadcast simply ended and Soviet television networks returned to regular programming.

== Legacy ==
While Canada won the series, the Soviets earned the respect of fans and players alike. The Canadians went from scoffing at their antiquated equipment and strange training methods and practices to admiration for their talent and conditioning. Frank Mahovlich said, "give the Russians a football and they'd win the Super Bowl in two years."

Soviet experts drew attention to a number of elements of the game that were not practiced by the USSR national team or were used rather poorly. In an interview with the Soviet Sportivnye Igry magazine, Vsevolod Bobrov called the Canadians' strong point the ability to focus and solve individual tactical problems, and the Soviet hockey players — collective tactics and teamwork of units. He also noted the difference between the Soviet and Canadian styles of goal shots.

Many Soviet citizens believed that the outcome may have been different if Anatoli Firsov and Vitaly Davydov had not sat out the series to protest a coaching change. In response, some offer that Canada was without Bobby Orr and Bobby Hull, Orr due to his knee troubles and Hull due to the exclusion of Canadians playing in the World Hockey Association. These were arguably the best Canadian players at the time (along with Phil Esposito), so neither team had all of its greatest talent on the ice. The Soviet team had an obvious advantage of playing together year-round. Meanwhile, the Canadian team was picked and prepared in only a few weeks and most players were not yet in top shape when the series began. At the time, NHL players did not regularly train during the summer months, using the period for a holiday or other activities.

According to IIHF historians, Szemberg and Podnieks, the Summit Series convinced Canadians that ice hockey was now a global game and that any one of the top national teams in the world could win the Olympic or World Championship titles. Sweden national team coach Billy Harris (a former NHL player) later recalled that "the (Swedish) media would ask me, 'do you see even one Swedish player who could possibly have a chance in the National Hockey League?' I answered, 'No, I see 14 of them!'"

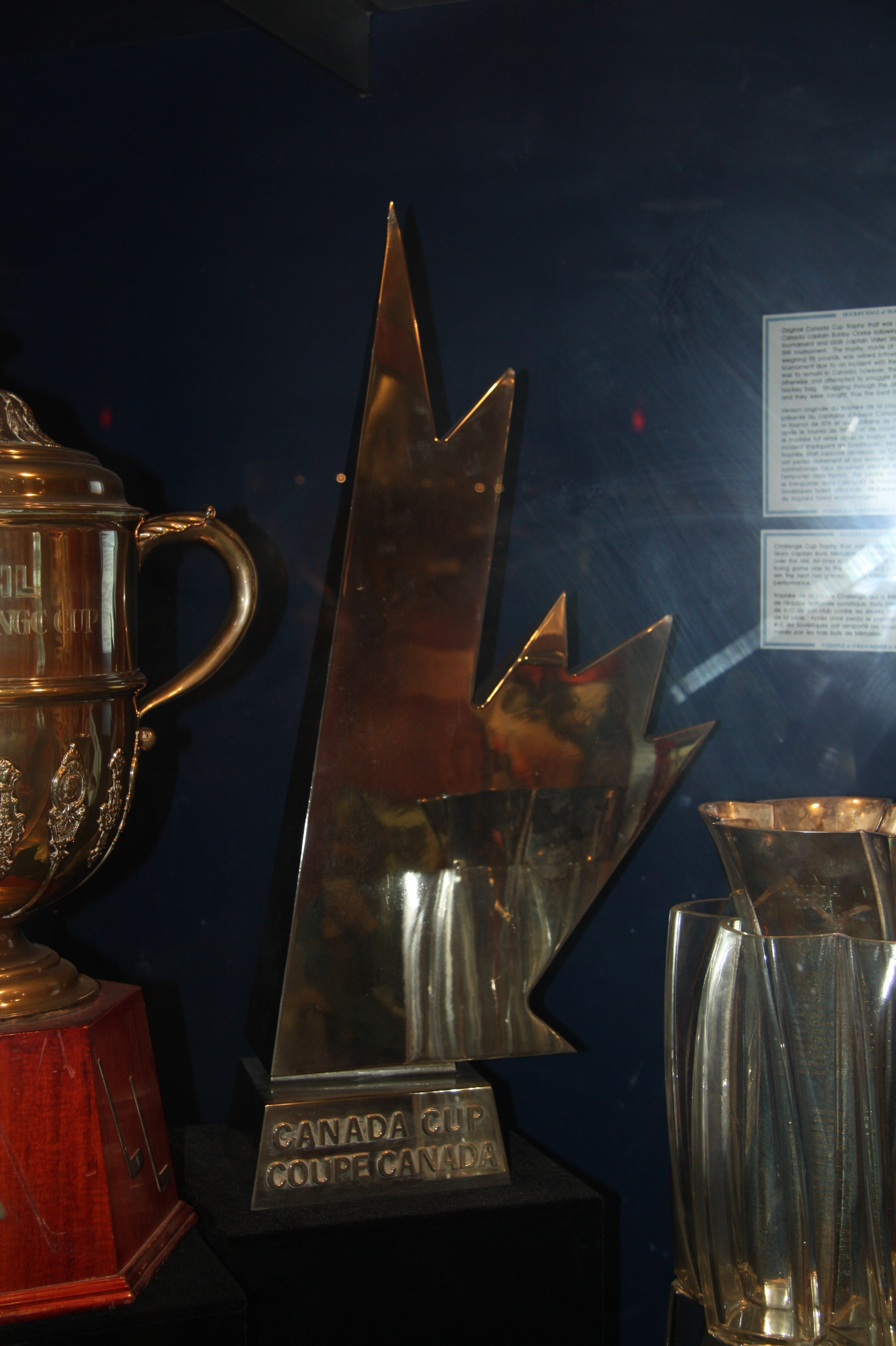
The Canada Cup at the Hockey Hall of Fame.

The success of the Summit Series led the NHL to organize further exhibitions against top Soviet clubs, such as the 1975-76 "Super Series '76 This was followed by the inaugural Canada Cup "best-on-best" tournament in 1976.

In North America, the Series (particularly the first few games) exposed the need for better preparation and off-season training. Philadelphia Flyers coach Fred Shero became an avid student of the Soviet style and was one of the first to bring the Soviet training techniques to the NHL as the Flyers won two Stanley Cup championships in 1974 and 1975. Tom Mellor (who joined the small but rapidly growing group of American-born NHL players after the 1972 Olympics) lamented that the NHL training methods of the early 1970s were vastly inferior to those of the Soviets. "When I went to play for Detroit after the Olympics, Alex Delvecchio was the coach. ... When he would coach, we would do a couple of one-on-ones, two-on-twos, three-on-twos, we'd scrimmage, and he would scrimmage with us. At the end of the scrimmage, we'd do a couple of figure eights and then go to the bar. That was the NHL and pro mentality." Mark Howe commented that the Soviet national team must have trained six hours on the day of a game in the 1972 Winter Olympics.

Mark Mulvoy covering the series for Sports Illustrated, called the series. "the single-greatest event I ever covered", and "the Summit Series was magical in every way. Kids being let out of school, TVs wheeled into classrooms, the emotion of it..." Swedish sports journalists were extremely impressed by the toughness and "never say die" fighting spirit of the Canadians, who lost only one game out of seven on European ice despite often trailing in the third period. According to Soviet player Boris Mikhailov, who later became a coach, "it was a meeting between two schools of hockey and we have since continued this great exchange and we have learned from each other, taking the best of both styles."

As time passed, the significance of the series grew in the public consciousness, and the term "Summit Series" became its unofficial accepted name. In Canada, the Summit Series is a source of national pride, and is seen by many as a landmark event in Canadian cultural history. In Canada, Paul Henderson's goal is considered to be the most famous in the history of the game, and can be referred to simply as "the goal". The series is also seen by many Canadians as an important win in the Cold War.

=== Legacy events ===
Many of the 1972 Summit Series players faced each other again in subsequent international contests. Henderson played the Soviets in the 1974 Summit Series organized by the WHA. Eleven of the Soviet 1972 team players played against the Montreal Canadiens in the December 31, 1975, game of the Super Series '76. Seven players of Team Canada 1972 played for Montreal (Frank Mahovlich, Pete Mahovlich, Awrey, Cournoyer, Dryden, Lapointe and Savard). Many of the players also played in the 1976 Canada Cup, including Bobby Orr, making his first appearance against the Soviets as a professional. He had missed the chance in the Super Series '76, also due to injury.

In 1987, fifteen years after the series, a 60-minute commemorative video was directed and produced by Tom McKee and published by Labatt Brewing Company Limited, Toronto. The video includes interviews with Alan Eagleson and former players Bobby Clarke, Yvan Cournoyer, Paul Henderson, and Serge Savard in the studio. Every goal from the series is included as is a mention of the Soviets' "shenanigans", as they try to interfere with one of the Canadians' practices in Moscow. Eagleson was later barred from public appearances with Team Canada members after his fraud convictions related to his hockey business dealings.

In 1989, Marcel Dionne retired as a member of the New York Rangers. He was the last active player from the Canadian roster. That same year, Sergei Priakin became the first Soviet to be given permission to play in the NHL, for the Calgary Flames.

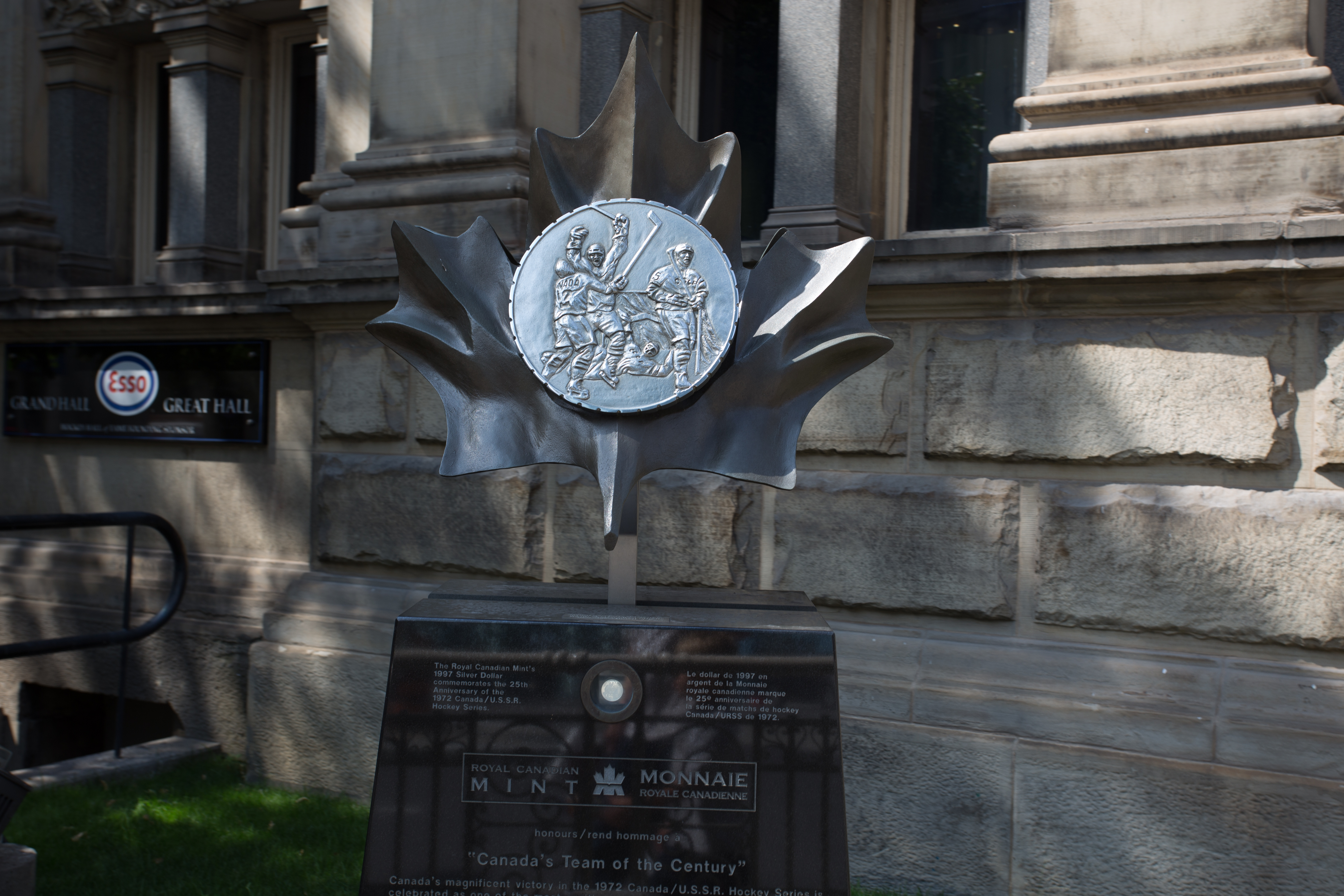
A sculpture of a coin minted by the Royal Canadian Mint in 1997 to commemorate the event

In 1997, the Royal Canadian Mint released a commemorative silver dollar coin to mark the 25th anniversary.

On November 2, 2005, the team was honoured, en masse, as members of the Canadian Sports Hall of Fame. In the induction ceremony, Phil Esposito spoke: "A lot of people will go back and say 1972 changed the face of the game and actually I believe it did. I'm not so sure it changed for the better, by the way. But it did change the way we think and look at hockey in this country."

In 2006, the CBC aired a two-part mini-series called Canada Russia '72, directed by T. W. Peacocke. The film is a dramatization of the series. The film was later made available on DVD.

In 2007, for the 35th anniversary of the series, Canadian and Russian national junior teams competed in the 2007 Super Series. Four games were played in Russia, followed by four in Canada. Canada won seven of eight games and game seven was a tie.

In 2010, the sweater Henderson wore while scoring the decisive final goal of the series was put up for auction by an anonymous American collector. The 42nd and winning bid of US$1,067,538 ($1,275,000 with auction fees, confirmed as the world record for hockey memorabilia by Guinness World Records in March 2012.) was placed by Mitchell Goldhar, a Canadian shopping mall mogul. It was also announced that Goldhar would be taking it on a tour of Canada, the locations of which to be decided by voters on Facebook.

In 2012, the 40th anniversary, several events took place. The 2012 Canada–Russia Challenge, a series between Canadian and Russian players took place in August. In September, two books were published to mark the anniversary. That month, in Russia, members of Team Canada went on a tour of Russian cities to celebrate the anniversary. A reciprocal tour of Canada was planned but no funding was available from the Government of Canada to sponsor the tour. Nevertheless, the anniversary was marked with several events in Canada. Team Canada received a star on Canada's Walk of Fame in Toronto. The series was replayed that month on Canadian television, and the Canadian team was honoured with a dinner at the Hockey Hall of Fame. Alan Eagleson was not part of any of the festivities. Also on the 40th anniversary, the IIHF Milestone Award was given to the Canadian and Russian teams for the event which had a "decisive influence on the development of the game". Reuters wrote that Canada was expected to win the series easily, but when they came from behind to win in the eighth and final game, it marked "the beginning of the modern hockey era".

In 2022, CBC Television produced a documentary mini-series about the series, entitled Summit '72. The documentary discusses the influence of Canadian Lloyd Percival's book The Hockey Handbook, which had been used extensively as a reference by the Soviets. Percival was not surprised at the first-game loss to the Soviets, when many Canadian analysts had predicted a Canadian runaway.

=== Cultural references ===
Henderson's goal in 1972 has been described as the "goal that everyone remembers" by the Canadian rockers The Tragically Hip in their song "Fireworks" from their album Phantom Power. The song describes the national eruption of celebration over the goal.

In the 1994 film Anna: 6 – 18, director Nikita Mikhalkov observes that to be a great nation, "Russia needed great enemies". The film then shows Phil Esposito in the penalty box from video of the series. Esposito is "performing a menacing pantomime" in the words of author Dave Bidini. The term "Esposito" also was added as a derogatory term to street slang in Russia.

In 2022, Russian indie project Past Day released a sovietwave track "USSR–Canada 1972", dedicated to the 50th anniversary of the Summit Series. It includes fragments of Nikolai Ozerov's reports.

== Schedule and results ==
=== Game one ===
September 2, 1972; 20:00 EDT	Canada	3–7 ( 2–2, 0–2, 1–3 )	Soviet Union	The Forum, Montreal

Ken Dryden	Goalies	Vladislav Tretiak
P. Esposito 1 (Bergman, F. Mahovlich) 0:30; Henderson 1 (Clarke, Ellis) 6:32 Clarke 1 (Henderson, Ellis) 48:22 / Goals / Zimin 1 (Yakushev, Shadrin) 12:30; Petrov 1 (Mikhailov) (sh) 17:28; Kharlamov 1 (Maltsev) 22:40; Kharlamov 2 (Maltsev) 30:18 Mikhailov 1 (Blinov) 53:32; Zimin 2 (unassisted) 54:29; Yakushev 1 (Shadrin) 58:37
8 min	Penalties	8 min
32	Shots	30

Source: Podnieks

=== Game two ===
September 4, 1972; 20:00 EDT	Canada	4–1 ( 0–0, 1–0, 3–1 )	Soviet Union	Maple Leaf Gardens, Toronto

Tony Esposito	Goalies	Vladislav Tretiak
P. Esposito 2 (Cashman, Park) 27:14; Cournoyer 1 (Park) (pp) 41:19 P. Mahovlich 1 (P. Esposito) (sh) 46:47; F. Mahovlich 1 (Cournoyer, Mikita) 48:59 / Goals / Yakushev 2 (Lyapkin, Zimin) 45:53
8 min	Penalties	8 min
36	Shots	21

Source: Podnieks

=== Game three ===
September 6, 1972; 19:00 CDT	Canada	4–4 ( 2–1, 2–3, 0–0 )	Soviet Union	Winnipeg Arena, Winnipeg

Tony Esposito	Goalies	Vladislav Tretiak
Parisé 1 (P. Esposito, White) 1:54 Ratelle 1 (Bergman, Cournoyer) 18:25; P. Esposito 3 (Parisé, Cashman) 24:19 Henderson 2 (Ellis, Clarke) 33:47 / Goals / Petrov 2 (unassisted) (sh) 3:16 Kharlamov 3 (Tsygankov) (sh) 32:56 Lebedev 1 (Vasiliev, Anisin) 34:59; Bodunov 1 (Anisin) 38:28
18 min	Penalties	8 min
38	Shots	25

Source: Podnieks

=== Game four ===
September 8, 1972; 17:00 PDT	Canada	3–5 ( 0–2, 1–2, 2–1 )	Soviet Union	Pacific Coliseum, Vancouver

Ken Dryden	Goalies	Vladislav Tretiak
Perreault 1 (unassisted) 25:37 Goldsworthy 1 (Bergman, P. Esposito) 46:54; Hull 1 (Goldsworthy, P. Esposito) 59:38 / Goals / Mikhailov 2 (Lutchenko, Petrov) (pp) 2:01; Mikhailov 3 (Lutchenko, Petrov) (pp) 7:29 Blinov 1 (Petrov, Mikhailov) 26:34; Vikulov 3 (Kharlamov, Maltsev) 33:52 Shadrin 1 (Yakushev, Vasiliev) 51:05
6 min	Penalties	4 min
41	Shots	31

Source: Podnieks

=== Game five ===
September 22, 1972; 20:00 MSD	Canada	4–5 ( 1–0, 2–0, 1–5 )	Soviet Union	Luzhniki Palace of Sports, Moscow

Tony Esposito	Goalies	Vladislav Tretiak
Parisé 2 (Gilbert, Perreault) 15:30; Clarke 2 (Henderson) 22:36; Henderson 3 (Clarke, Lapointe) 31:58 Henderson 4 (Clarke) – 44:56 / Goals / Blinov 2 (Petrov, Kuzkin) 43:34 Anisin 1 (Lyapkin, Yakushev) 49:05; Shadrin 2 (Anisin) 49:13; Gusev 1 (Ragulin, Kharlamov) 51:41; Vikulov 2 (Kharlamov) 54:46
10 min	Penalties	12 min
37	Shots	33

Source: Podnieks

=== Game six ===
September 24, 1972; 20:00 MSD	Canada	3–2 ( 0–0, 3–2, 0–0 )	Soviet Union	Luzhniki Palace of Sports, Moscow

Ken Dryden	Goalies	Vladislav Tretiak
Hull 2 (Gilbert) 25:13; Cournoyer 2 (Berenson) 26:21; Henderson 5 (unassisted) 26:36 / Goals / Lyapkin 1 (Yakushev, Shadrin) 21:12 Yakushev 3 (Shadrin, Lyapkin) (pp) 37:11
31 min	Penalties	4 min
22	Shots	29

Source: Podnieks

=== Game seven ===
September 26, 1972; 20:00 MSD	Canada	4–3 ( 2–2, 0–0, 2–1 )	Soviet Union	Luzhniki Palace of Sports, Moscow

Tony Esposito	Goalies	Vladislav Tretiak
P. Esposito 4 (Henderson, Ellis) 4:09 P. Esposito 5 (Parisé, Savard) 17:34; Gilbert 1 (Hull, Ratelle) 42:13; Henderson 6 (Savard) 57:54 / Goals / Yakushev 4 (Shadrin, Lyapkin) 10:17; Petrov 2 (Vikulov, Tsygankov) (pp) 16:27 Yakushev 5 (Maltsev, Lutchenko) 45:15
23 min	Penalties	17 min
25	Shots	31

Source: Podnieks

=== Game eight ===
September 28, 1972; 20:00 MSD	Canada	6–5 ( 2–2, 1–3, 3–0 )	Soviet Union	Luzhniki Palace of Sports, Moscow

Ken Dryden	Goalies	Vladislav Tretiak
P. Esposito 6 (Park) (pp) 6:45; Park 1 (Hull, Ratelle) 16:59 White 1 (Ratelle, Gilbert) 30:32 P. Esposito 7 (P. Mahovlich) 42:27; Cournoyer 3 (Park, P. Esposito) 52:56; Henderson 7 (P. Esposito) 59:26 / Goals / Yakushev 6 (Maltsev, Lyapkin) (pp) 3:34; Lutchenko 1 (Kharlamov) (pp) 13:10 Shadrin 3 (unassisted) 20:21; Yakushev 7 (unassisted) 31:43; Vasiliev 1 (Shadrin) (pp) 36:44
25 min	Penalties	15 min
36	Shots	27

Source: Podnieks

=== Canada vs. Sweden ===
Game one

September 16, 1972	Canada	4–1 ( 1–0, 1–1, 2–0 )	Sweden	Johanneshovs Isstadion, Stockholm

Tony Esposito	Goalies	Christer Abrahamsson
Henderson (Ellis) 1:45; Clarke 1 (Ellis) 21:20 Park 1 (unassisted) 49:15; Cashman 1 (Parisé) 56:04 / Goals / Sterner 1 (Sjoberg) (pp) 23:51
27 min	Penalties	8 min
32	Shots	20

Source: Dryden & Mulvoy, Podnieks

Game two

September 17, 1972	Canada	4–4 ( 1–0, 1–1, 2–3 )	Sweden	Johanneshovs Isstadion, Stockholm

Eddie Johnston	Goalies	Curt Larsson
Hadfield 1 (Gilbert) 10:30 Don Awrey 1 (unassisted) 29:15 Martin 1 (Perreault) 43:32 Esposito 1 (unassisted) (sh) 59:13 / Goals / Nilsson 1 (Sjoberg) 21:12 Lundstrom 1 (Hammarstrom) 43:16 Hansson 1 (Hedberg) (pp) 47:09; Hammarstrom 1 (Lundstrom) (pp) 51:17
24 min	Penalties	4 min
23	Shots	31

Source: Dryden & Mulvoy, Podnieks

=== Canada vs. Czechoslovakia ===
September 30, 1972	Canada	3–3 ( 2–0, 0–2, 1–1 )	Czechoslovakia	Sportovni Hala, Prague

Ken Dryden	Goalies	Jiri Holecek
Savard 1 (Park) (pp) 8:19; P. Mahovlich 1 (Tallon) 13:55 Parisé 1 (Savard, Park) 59:56 / Goals / Stastny 1 (Bubla) 29:02; Stastny 2 (unassisted) (pp) 35:22; Kochta 1 (Holecek) (pp) 42:28
17 min	Penalties	10 min
24	Shots	33

Source: Podnieks, Dryden & Mulvoy

== Statistics ==
Statistics do not include the games in Czechoslovakia and Sweden.

=== Team ===
Team	W	L	T	GF	GA	PP	PPG	SHG	PIM	SOG	SA
Canada	4	3	1	31	32	23	2	1	145	267	481
USSR	3	4	1	32	31	38	9	3	82	227	517

Source: MacSkimming 1996, Dryden & Mulvoy

=== Players ===
Canada
Scoring

#	Player	Pos	GP	G	A	Pts	PIM	+/-	Team
7	Phil Esposito	C	8	7	6	13	15	+2	Boston Bruins
19	Paul Henderson	LW	8	7	3	10	4	+6	Toronto Maple Leafs
28	Bobby Clarke	C	8	2	4	6	18	+2	Philadelphia Flyers
12	Yvan Cournoyer	RW	8	3	2	5	2	E	Montreal Canadiens
5	Brad Park	D	8	1	4	5	2	+4	New York Rangers
10	Dennis Hull	LW	4	2	2	4	4	+4	Chicago Black Hawks
22	J. P. Parisé	LW	6	2	2	4	28	+1	Minnesota North Stars
8	Rod Gilbert	RW	6	1	3	4	9	+1	New York Rangers
18	Jean Ratelle	C	6	1	3	4	0	−2	New York Rangers
2	Gary Bergman	D	8	0	3	3	13	+5	Detroit Red Wings
6	Ron Ellis	RW	8	0	3	3	8	+3	Toronto Maple Leafs
33	Gilbert Perreault	C	2	1	1	2	0	+2	Buffalo Sabres
9	Bill Goldsworthy	RW	3	1	1	2	4	E	Minnesota North Stars
27	Frank Mahovlich	LW	6	1	1	2	0	−2	Montreal Canadiens
20	Pete Mahovlich	LW	7	1	1	2	4	+1	Montreal Canadiens
17	Bill White	D	7	1	1	2	8	+7	Chicago Black Hawks
14	Wayne Cashman	RW	2	0	2	2	14	+2	Boston Bruins
23	Serge Savard	D	5	0	2	2	0	−1	Montreal Canadiens
21	Stan Mikita	C	2	0	1	1	0	+1	Chicago Black Hawks
15	Red Berenson	LW	2	0	1	1	0	E	Detroit Red Wings
25	Guy Lapointe	D	7	0	1	1	6	−3	Montreal Canadiens
24	Mickey Redmond	RW	1	0	0	0	0	−1	Detroit Red Wings
26	Don Awrey	D	2	0	0	0	0	−2	Boston Bruins
11	Vic Hadfield	LW	2	0	0	0	0	−3	New York Rangers
16	Rod Seiling	D	3	0	0	0	0	−6	New York Rangers
3	Pat Stapleton	D	7	0	0	0	0	+6	Chicago Black Hawks

Goaltending

#	Player	GP	W	L	T	GA	GAA	SV%	Team
35	Tony Esposito	4	2	1	1	13	3.33	.882	Chicago Black Hawks
29	Ken Dryden	4	2	2	0	19	4.75	.838	Montreal Canadiens

Sources: The Globe and Mail, Society for International Hockey Research, Plus-minus: Dryden & Mulvoy

=== Did not play ===
Seven other players were part of Team Canada, but did not play against the Soviet Union. The injured Bobby Orr did not play any games with Team Canada, while the other six played against Sweden, and Dionne, Glennie and Tallon played against Czechoslovakia. The seven players, with their jersey numbers:

- Brian Glennie (#38), Jocelyn Guevremont (#37), Bobby Orr (#4), Dale Tallon (#32) – defence
- Marcel Dionne (#34), Rick Martin (#36) – forward
- Eddie Johnston (#1) – goaltender

In addition, three junior-age players were invited to training camp to take part in practices only. All three were clients of Alan Eagleson; had been drafted in the first round of the 1972 NHL entry draft just five weeks before Team Canada roster was selected; and started their professional careers just days after the Summit Series ended. The three worked with the team until it left for Europe after the Canadian stage of the Summit Series. The three players, with their jersey numbers:

- John Van Boxmeer (#40) - defence
- Billy Harris (#39) - forward
- Michel Larocque (#30) - goaltender

==== Coaches ====
- Harry Sinden – coach
- John Ferguson – assistant

Notes

- Seven Canadians played in all eight games: Phil Esposito, Bergman, Park, Cournoyer, and the high scoring line (3 goals with all three earning a point, 4 goals with two of the three earning a point) of Clarke, Henderson and Ellis.

Soviet Union
Scoring

#	Player	Pos	GP	G	A	Pts	PIM	+/-	Team
15	Alexander Yakushev	LW	8	7	4	11	2	+5	Spartak Moscow
19	Vladimir Shadrin	C	8	3	5	8	0	+7	Spartak Moscow
17	Valeri Kharlamov	LW	7	3	4	7	16	E	CSKA Moscow
16	Vladimir Petrov	C	8	3	4	7	10	−6	CSKA Moscow
25	Yuri Lyapkin	D	6	1	4	5	2	+3	Spartak Moscow
13	Boris Mikhailov	LW	8	3	2	5	7	−4	CSKA Moscow
10	Alexander Maltsev	RW	8	0	5	5	0	−6	Dynamo Moscow
22	Vyacheslav Anisin	C	7	1	3	4	2	+3	Krylya Sovetov Moscow
3	Vladimir Lutchenko	D	8	1	3	4	0	−1	CSKA Moscow
11	Yevgeni Zimin	F	2	2	1	3	0	+1	Spartak Moscow
9	Yury Blinov	LW	5	2	1	3	2	−2	CSKA Moscow
18	Vladimir Vikulov	RW	6	2	1	3	0	−8	CSKA Moscow
6	Valery Vasiliev	D	6	1	2	3	2	+1	Dynamo Moscow
7	Gennadiy Tsygankov	D	8	0	2	2	4	−5	CSKA Moscow
23	Yuri Lebedev	RW	3	1	0	1	2	−2	Krylya Sovetov Moscow
24	Alexander Bodunov	LW	3	1	0	1	0	−1	Krylya Sovetov Moscow
2	Aleksandr Gusev	D	6	1	0	1	2	−1	CSKA Moscow
5	Alexander Ragulin	D	6	0	1	1	4	−2	CSKA Moscow
4	Viktor Kuzkin	D	7	0	1	1	8	−5	CSKA Moscow
29	Alexander Martynyuk	RW	1	0	0	0	0	E	Spartak Moscow
21	Viacheslav Solodukhin	C	1	0	0	0	0	−2	SKA Leningrad
8	Vyacheslav Starshinov	F	1	0	0	0	0	−1	Spartak Moscow
14	Yuri Shatalov	D	2	0	0	0	0	+1	Krylya Sovetov Moscow
30	Alexander Volchkov	C	3	0	0	0	0	E	CSKA Moscow
26	Yevgeny Paladiev	D	3	0	0	0	0	+2	Spartak Moscow
12	Yevgeni Mishakov	LW	6	0	0	0	11	−7	CSKA Moscow

Goaltending

#	Player	GP	W	L	T	GA	GAA	SV%	Team
20	Vladislav Tretiak	8	3	4	1	31	3.88	.882	CSKA Moscow

Sources: The Globe and Mail, Society for International Hockey Research, Plus-minus: Dryden & Mulvoy

==== Did not play ====
- Vitaly Davydov – defence
- Anatoli Firsov – forward/left wing
- Viktor Zinger (#1), Alexander Sidelnikov (#27), Alexander Pashkov – goaltenders

Jersey numbers: The Globe and Mail

==== Coaches ====
- Vsevolod Bobrov – coach
- Boris Kulagin – assistant

Notes

- With the exception of SKA Leningrad's Solodukhin, every Soviet player came from a team based in Moscow.

== See also ==
- 1974 Summit Series
- Aggie Kukulowicz, Canadian-born Russian language interpreter for the series
- List of international ice hockey competitions featuring NHL players
- Politics and sports
