= Andrei Starovoytov =

Soviet ice hockey administrator and referee (1915–1997)

- Born: 16 December 1915; Smolensk, Russian Empire
- Died: 23 March 1997 (aged 81); Moscow, Russia
- Education: State Central Institute of Physical Education
- Occupations: Ice hockey referee and administrator
- Known for: General Secretary of the Soviet Union Ice Hockey Federation
- Awards: Olympic Order (1986); IIHF Hall of Fame (1997); Russian Hockey Hall of Fame (2004)

Andrei Vasilyevich Starovoytov (Russian: Андрей Васильевич Старовойтов; 16 December 1915 – 22 March 1997) was a Russian ice hockey administrator, referee and player. He won three Soviet ice hockey championships as a player, and was later an ice hockey referee at eight World Championships. He was the general secretary of the Soviet Union Ice Hockey Federation for 17 years, and negotiated Soviet participation in the Summit Series. He was posthumously inducted into the IIHF Hall of Fame.

== Early life and playing career ==
Andrei Vasilyevich Starovoytov was born in Smolensk, on 16 December 1915. He started playing ice hockey and bandy as a youth during the 1930s. He was a Smolensk regional champion in speed skating, before he moved to Moscow at age 21 to enter the football and hockey department of the Higher School of Coaches. He did not pursue coaching, but continued his studies at the State Central Institute of Physical Education.

In Moscow, Starovoytov played bandy for Spartak before being recruited to play ice hockey for the Soviet Armed Forces. While playing hockey, he worked at the Lenin Military-Political Academy, and was awarded the Medal "For the Victory over Germany in the Great Patriotic War 1941–1945", and the Medal "For Battle Merit" in 1944. Starovoytov played as a defenceman for HC CSKA Moscow from 1946 to 1951, where he established himself as a tough player and strong skater, who played on the second line. He was a member of championship teams in 1948, 1949 and 1950, and scored 10 goals in 50 games at the Soviet championships. With CSKA Moscow, he played for coach Pavel Korotkov, and became a lifelong friend of team captain Vsevolod Bobrov. When Korotkov retired, Starovoytov declined an offer to became coach of the team, citing work commitments to the Lenin Military-Political Academy. Anatoly Tarasov became coach of the team, then cut Starovoytov one year later.

== Refereeing career ==
Starovoytov later served as an ice hockey referee in the top tier of Soviet hockey from 1951 to 1969. He was the first Soviet hockey referee to work international games, and was chairman of the All-Union Board of Referees from 1955 to 1960. He officiated at the Ice Hockey World Championships eight times including, 1955, the 1956 Winter Olympics, 1957, 1958, 1961, 1963, 1965 and 1966. He was named one of the top ten referees in Soviet hockey in 12 different seasons. He was also a member of the International Ice Hockey Federation (IIHF) referee council from 1969 to 1986.

== Administration career ==
In the 1960s, Starovoytov led efforts to establish the International Moscow Tournament, later known as the Izvestia Trophy and the Channel One Cup. He convinced the Communist Party of the Soviet Union that the competition was needed to prepare for the Ice Hockey World Championships, and to elevate Russia's influence in international hockey. He served as the general secretary of the Soviet Union Ice Hockey Federation from 1969 to 1986. During that period, the Soviet Union national ice hockey team won three gold medals at the Winter Olympic Games, and 12 gold medals at the Ice Hockey World Championships.

Negotiating with Joe Kryczka of the Canadian Amateur Hockey Association, Starovoytov arranged for the Soviet national team to play the Canada men's national ice hockey team in what became known as the 1972 Summit Series. The agreement was signed and announced on 18 April 1972, at the Hotel International Prague during the 1972 World Ice Hockey Championships, and approved by Bunny Ahearne and Fred Page of the IIHF. Starovoytov agreed to the eight-game series feeling that his Soviet players would be able to defeat Canadian professionals from the National Hockey League. His confidence was evident from an interview with journalist Red Fisher, where Starovoytov believed his country could win all eight games.

Canada prevailed with four wins and a draw in eight games, but he was not deterred in having another competition. During the 1974 World Junior Ice Hockey Championships, Starovoytov approached Canadian leaders Jack Devine and Gordon Juckes, regarding having another series. The 1974 Summit Series was agreed to be a six-games series versus professionals from the World Hockey Association, but was later extended to eight games. The Soviets won the rematch with four victories and three draws in eight games.

== Later life and honors ==
In 1986, Starovoytov was made an honorary life member of the IIHF, and received the Olympic Order in 1986 for contributions to ice hockey. He died in Moscow on 23 March 1997, and was interred at the Golovinskoye Cemetery in Moscow.

Starovoytov was posthumously inducted into the builder category of the IIHF Hall of Fame in 1997. The Kontinental Hockey League established the Andrei Starovoytov Award in 1997, also known as the "Golden Whistle" to recognize its referee of the year. In 2004, he was inducted into the Russian Hockey Hall of Fame.
