= Alexander Martynyuk =

Soviet ice hockey player (1945–2022)

Alexander Akimovich Martynyuk (Russian: Александр Акимович Мартынюк; 11 September 1945 – 16 November 2022) was a Russian ice hockey player who played in the Soviet Hockey League.

== Career ==
He played for HC Spartak Moscow with linemates Alexander Yakushev and Vladimir Shadrin. During the 1973 World Ice Hockey Championships Martynyuk scored eight goals against West Germany. He was inducted into the Russian and Soviet Hockey Hall of Fame in 1973.
