= Vladimir Shadrin =

Russian ice hockey player (1948–2021)

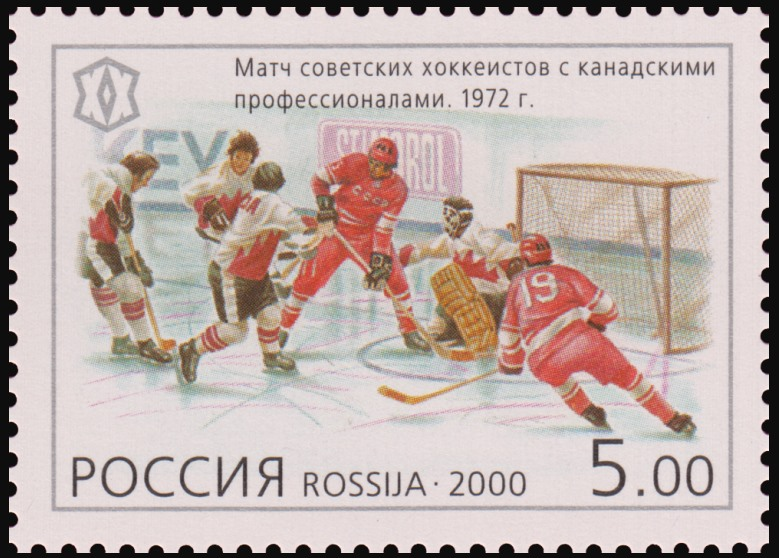
- Shadrin No.19
- Born: 6 June 1948 Moscow, Russian SFSR, Soviet Union
- Died: 26 August 2021 (aged 73) Moscow, Russia
- Height: 5 ft 11 in (180 cm)
- Weight: 187 lb (85 kg; 13 st 5 lb)
- Position: Centre
- Shot: Left
- Played for: HC Spartak Moscow; Oji Seishi
- National team: Soviet Union
- Playing career: 1964–1983

Vladimir Shadrin
Medal record

Men's ice hockey

Representing Soviet Union

Olympic Games
Gold medal – first place	1972 Sapporo	Team
Gold medal – first place	1976 Innsbruck	Team

World Championships
Gold medal – first place	1970 Sweden	
Gold medal – first place	1971 Switzerland	
Silver medal – second place	1972 Czechoslovakia	
Gold medal – first place	1973 Soviet Union	
Gold medal – first place	1974 Finland	
Gold medal – first place	1975 West Germany	
Silver medal – second place	1976 Poland	
Bronze medal – third place	1977 Austria	

Vladimir Nikolaevich Shadrin (Russian: Владимир Николаевич Шадрин; 6 June 1948 – 26 August 2021) was a Russian ice hockey centre who played in the Soviet Championship League from 1964 to 1979 for HC Spartak Moscow. He also played in the Japan Ice Hockey League for Oji Seishi between 1979 and 1983. He was inducted into the Russian and Soviet Hockey Hall of Fame in 1971.

== Biography ==
Shadrin won three Soviet League championships with Spartak Moscow (1967, 1969, 1976). On the international level, Shadrin won two Olympic gold medals and five World Championship titles. He was one of the stars on the Soviet team that played Team Canada in the famous 1972 Summit Series. During this series he finished second in team scoring, behind Alexander Yakushev, with three goals and five assists for eight points.

Shadrin, who had cancer, died on 26 August 2021, after contracting COVID-19. He was 73.
