= Viktor Zinger =

Russian ice hockey goltender (1941–2013)

- Born: October 29, 1941 Davydovo, USSR
- Died: September 24, 2013 (aged 71) Moscow, Russia
- Height: 172 cm (5 ft 8 in)
- Weight: 70 kg (154 lb; 11 st 0 lb)
- Position: Goaltender
- Played for: HC Spartak Moscow
- National team: Soviet Union
- Playing career: 1958–1977
Medal record
Representing Soviet Union
Olympic Games
Gold medal – first place	1968 Grenoble	Team
World Championships
Gold medal – first place	1965 Finland	Team
Gold medal – first place	1966 Yugoslavia	Team
Gold medal – first place	1967 Austria	Team
Gold medal – first place	1969 Sweden	Team

Viktor Aleksandrovich Zinger (Russian: Ви́ктор Алекса́ндрович Зи́нгер, 29 October 1941 – 24 September 2013) was a Russian ice hockey goaltender. As a member of the Soviet national team he won gold medals at the Winter Olympics in 1968 and at the world championships in 1965, 1966, 1967 and 1969. From 1965 to 1967 he was a backup for Viktor Konovalenko. In 1969 he was the starting goalie and played in all 10 games (backed up by Viktor Puchkov). In the spring of 1969 Zinger also toured Canada as a member of a Moscow Selects team that played the Canadian National team and various regional teams.

Zinger was also back up to Vladislav Tretiak in the classic 1972 Summit Series against Canadian NHL players, but he did not see any ice time. He was inducted into the Russian and Soviet Hockey Hall of Fame in 1967.

Zinger started his club career in 1958, with HC CSKA Moscow coached by Anatoly Tarasov. At the time CSKA already had two strong goaltenders, Nikolai Puchkov and Yuri Ovchukov. Hence Zinger had no opportunity to play in the Soviet League until 1961, when he was transferred to SKA Kuibyshev. In 1964 he moved to HC Spartak Moscow and played for them until retiring in 1977. With Spartak he won the Soviet title in 1967, 1969 and 1976 and placed second in the IIHF European Champions Cup in 1970 and 1977. After retiring from competitions, Zinger had a long career with Spartak, first as goaltender coach of the main team and then as head coach of the junior team.

== Career statistics ==
=== International ===
Year	Team	Event	GP	W	L	T	MIN	GA	SO	GAA	SV%
1965	Soviet Union	WC	2	2	0	0	120	3	0	1.50	—
1966	Soviet Union	WC	2	2	0	0	-	0	1	0.00	—
1967	Soviet Union	WC	4	3	0	0	-	-	1	-	.944
1968	Soviet Union	OLY	2	2	0	0	120	1	1	0.50	.963
1969	Soviet Union	WC	10	8	2	0	-	-	0	-	-
1972	Soviet Union	Summit Series	0	0	0	0	0	0	0	-	—
Senior totals			20	17	2	0	-	-	3	-	—
