= Yury Blinov =

Russian ice hockey player (born 1949)

Medal record

Men's ice hockey

Representing Soviet Union

Olympic Games
Gold medal – first place	1972 Sapporo	Team

Yury Ivanovich Blinov (born January 13, 1949, in Moscow, Soviet Union) is a retired Soviet ice hockey player who played in the Soviet Hockey League. He played for HC CSKA Moscow. He was also a member of the Soviet team for the Summit Series against Canada. He was inducted into the Russian and Soviet Hockey Hall of Fame in 1972.
