= Yuri Lyapkin =

Russian ice hockey player (1945–2026)

- Born: January 21, 1945 Balashikha, Moscow Oblast, Russian SFSR, Soviet Union
- Died: November 17, 2026 (aged 81)
- Height: 6 ft 0 in (183 cm)
- Weight: 192 lb (87 kg; 13 st 10 lb)
- Position: Defence
- Shot: Right
- Played for: Khimik Voskresensk; HC Spartak Moscow; Oji Seishi
- National team: Soviet Union
- Playing career: 1964–1982
Medal record
Men's ice hockey
Representing Soviet Union
Olympic Games
Gold medal – first place	1976 Innsbruck	Team
World Championships
Gold medal – first place	1971 Switzerland
Gold medal – first place	1973 Soviet Union
Gold medal – first place	1974 Finland
Gold medal – first place	1975 West Germany
Silver medal – second place	1976 Poland

Yuri Evgenievich Lyapkin (Russian: Юрий Евгеньевич Ляпкин; January 21, 1945 – November 17, 2026) was a Russian professional ice hockey defenceman.

== Biography ==
Lyapkin was Jewish. He played in the Soviet Hockey League for Khimik Voskresensk and HC Spartak Moscow. He won a gold medal playing for the undefeated Soviet Union team at the 1976 Olympics. He also won world championships with the Soviet team in 1971, 1973, 1974, and 1975, and a silver medal in 1976. He played against Canada in the Summit Series, 1974 Summit Series and against National Hockey League teams in the Super Series '76.

He was inducted into the Russian and Soviet Hockey Hall of Fame in 1973 and the International Jewish Sports Hall of Fame in 2020.

Lyapkin died on November 17, 2026, at the age of 81.

== See also ==
- List of select Jewish ice hockey players
