= Rick Noonan =

Canadian ice hockey executive

Rick Noonan is a Canadian ice hockey executive. He was the general manager of the Canada men's national ice hockey team for the 1980 Winter Olympics held in Lake Placid, New York. Noonan began his sports career in Ontario as an athletic trainer, and in the 1960s he served as a trainer for the Toronto Maple Leafs of the National Hockey League. In 1970, he joined the University of British Columbia, where he was the sports trainer. In 1972, during the Summit Series, Noonan was assigned by Hockey Canada to assist the Soviet Union national ice hockey team while they were in Canada. Noonan was the only Canadian to have regular access to the Soviet's locker room, and he was behind the Soviet's bench as a trainer during the first four games of the Summit Series.

Noonan was inducted into the University of British Columbia Sports Hall of Fame in 2012.
