= Alexander Yakushev =

Russian ice hockey player (born 1947)

- Hockey Hall of Fame, 2018
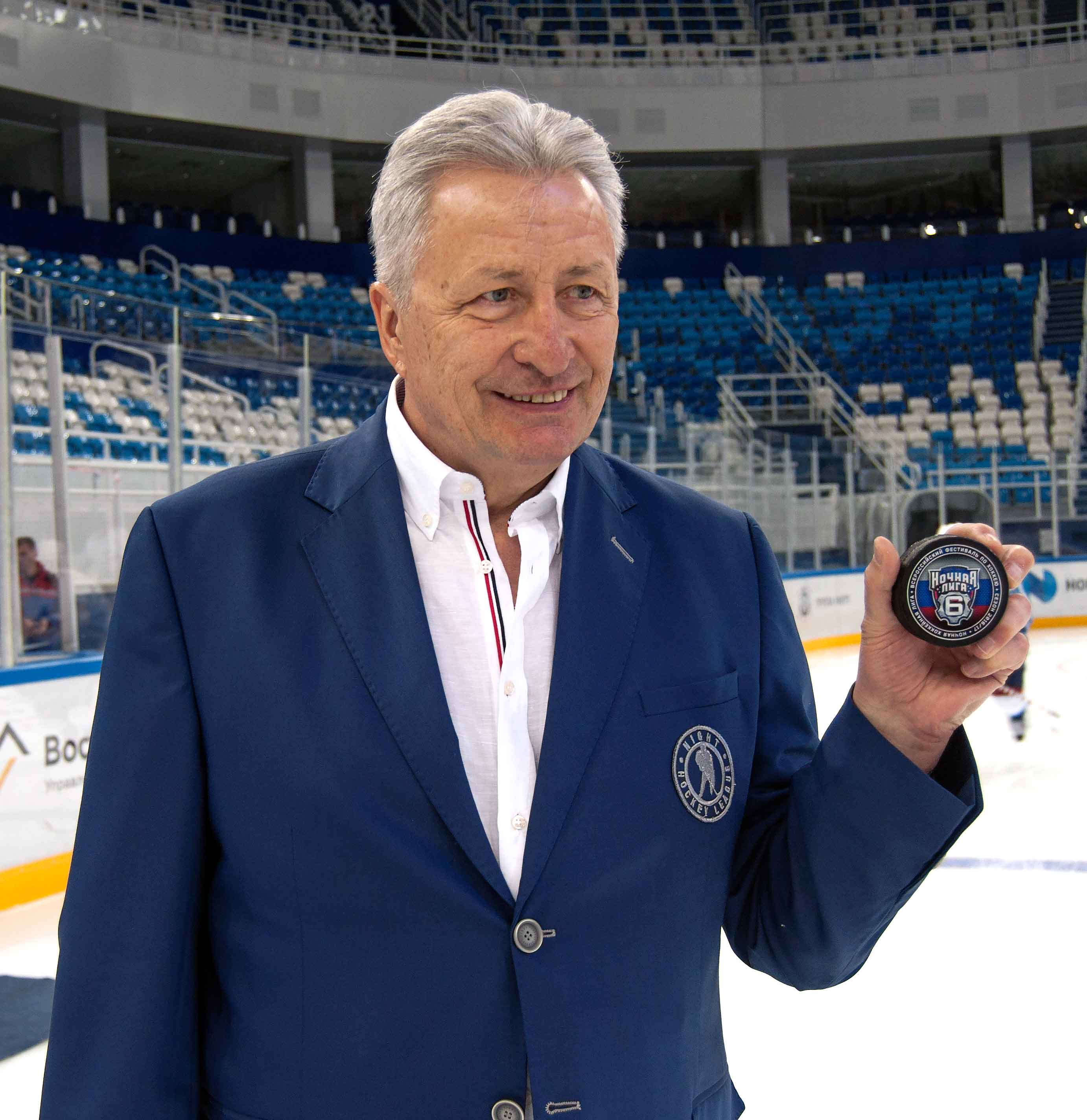
- Yakushev in 2014
- Born: January 2, 1947 (age 79) Balashikha, Russian SFSR, Soviet Union
- Height: 6 ft 3 in (191 cm)
- Weight: 201 lb (91 kg; 14 st 5 lb)
- Position: Left wing
- Shot: Left
- Played for: HC Spartak Moscow; EC Kapfenberg
- National team: Soviet Union
- Playing career: 1964–1983
Medal record
Olympic Games
Gold medal – first place	1972 Sapporo	Team
Gold medal – first place	1976 Innsbruck	Team
World Championships
Gold medal – first place	1967 Austria
Gold medal – first place	1969 Sweden
Gold medal – first place	1970 Sweden
Silver medal – second place	1972 Czechoslovakia
Gold medal – first place	1973 Soviet Union
Gold medal – first place	1974 Finland
Gold medal – first place	1975 West Germany
Silver medal – second place	1976 Poland
Bronze medal – third place	1977 Austria
Gold medal – first place	1979 Soviet Union

Alexander Sergeyevich Yakushev (Russian: Александр Серге́евич Якушев; born January 2, 1947) is a Russian former ice hockey player and coach. As a member of the Soviet Union men's national ice hockey team, he played in the Summit Series, the Ice Hockey World Championships, and the Olympic Games. He later coached HC Spartak Moscow and the Russian national team. He is inducted into both the IIHF Hall of Fame and the Hockey Hall of Fame.

== Playing career ==
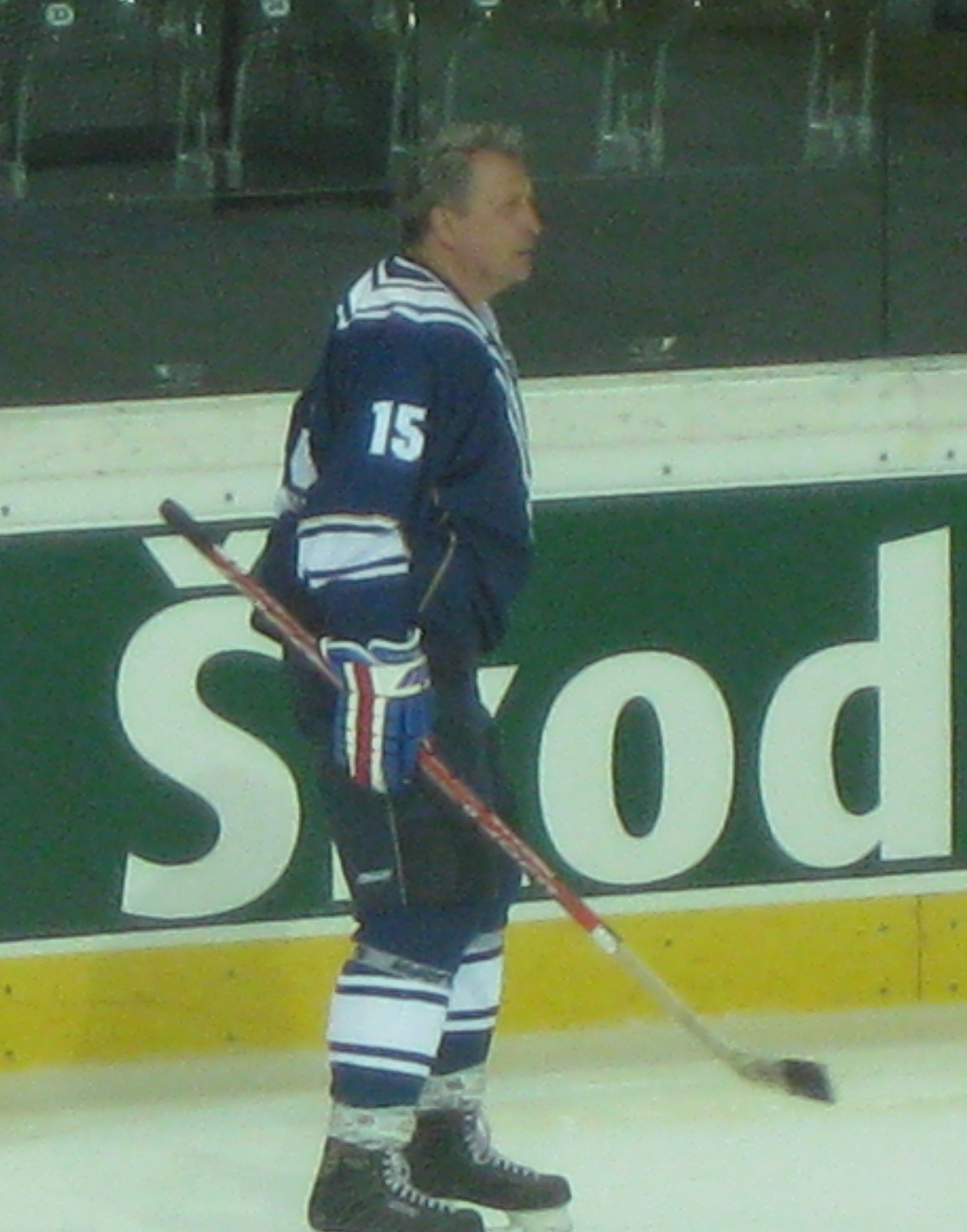
Alexander Yakushev in May 2009

Born in Moscow, Alexander Yakushev is best known as one of the stars for the Soviet Union men's national ice hockey team that played Team Canada in the famous 1972 Summit Series. His style of play was atypical of his colleagues who were fast and skilled; he was often described as the equivalent of Canada's Phil Esposito. By the end of the Summit Series, Yakushev led the Soviets in scoring with 7 goals and 4 assists for 11 points. He has also played in numerous Olympic and World Championship tournaments, winning Olympic gold in 1972 and 1976 and having been crowned World Champion seven times.

== Coaching career ==
After retiring from hockey, Yakushev coached HC Spartak Moscow for several years and between 1998 and 2000 he led the Russia men's national ice hockey team.

== Honors ==
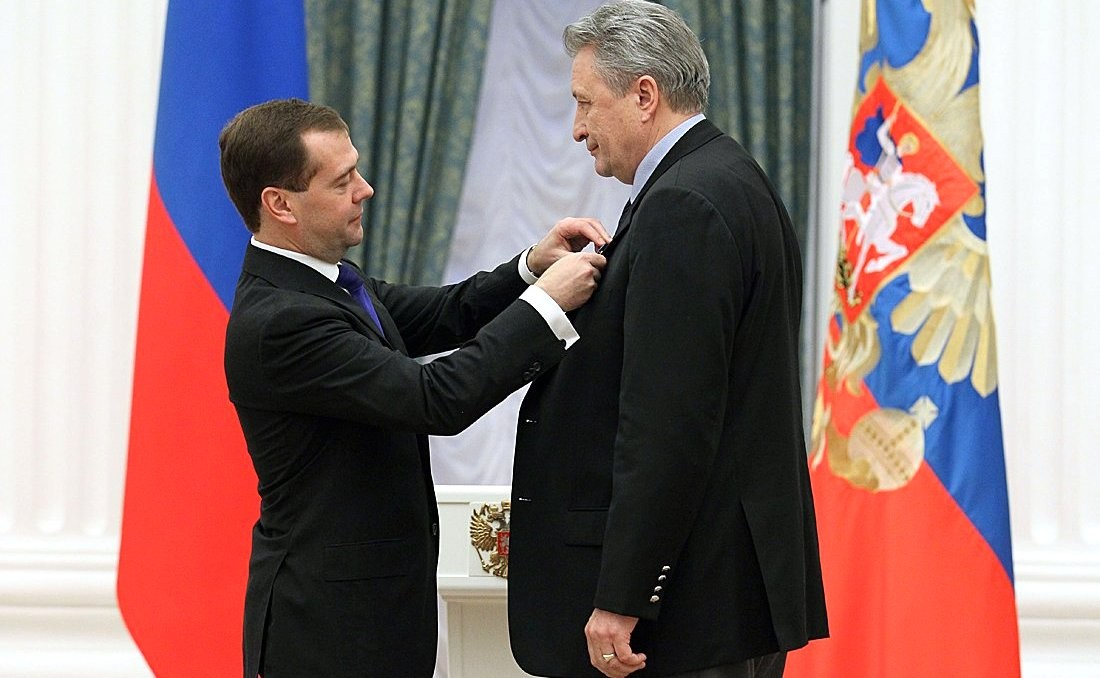
With Dmitry Medvedev at presentation of the Order of Honour, 29 December 2011

Yakushev was inducted into the IIHF Hall of Fame in 2003. On June 26, 2018, it was announced that he would be inducted into the Hockey Hall of Fame, joining fellow Summit Series teammates Vladislav Tretiak and Valeri Kharlamov.

=== International statistics ===
Year	Team	Comp	GP	G	A	Pts	PIM
1967	Soviet Union	WC	2	1	0	1	0
1969	Soviet Union	WC	6	1	1	2	2
1970	Soviet Union	WC	6	3	3	6	8
1972	Soviet Union	SS	8	7	4	11	4
1972	Soviet Union	OG	5	0	3	3	2
1972	Soviet Union	WC	10	11	4	15	0
1973	Soviet Union	WC	10	9	6	15	2
1974	Soviet Union	SS	7	6	2	8	2
1974	Soviet Union	WC	10	7	7	14	2
1975	Soviet Union	WC	8	11	5	16	2
1976	Soviet Union	OG	6	4	9	13	2
1976	Soviet Union	WC	10	6	1	7	0
1977	Soviet Union	WC	10	7	4	11	0
1979	Soviet Union	WC	8	4	2	6	8
World Championship totals			80	60	33	93	23
Olympic totals			11	4	12	16	4

Awards
Preceded by Vyacheslav Starshinov	Soviet Scoring Champion; 1969	Succeeded by Vladimir Petrov
