= Vikulov =

Vikulov (Russian: Викулов) is a surname. Notable people with the surname include:

- Sergei Vikulov (born 1957), Russian ice hockey player
- Sergey Vikulov (1922–2006), Soviet Russian poet and editor
- Vladimir Vikulov (1946–2013), Soviet ice hockey player
