= 1972 Ice Hockey World Championships =

1972 edition of the World Ice Hockey Championships

Tournament details
- Host country: Czechoslovakia
- Venue: 1 (in 1 host city)
- Dates: 7–22 April
- Teams: 6

Final positions
- Champions: Czechoslovakia (3rd title)
- Runners-up: Soviet Union
- Third place: Sweden
- Fourth place: Finland

Tournament statistics
- Games played: 30
- Goals scored: 288 (9.6 per game)
- Attendance: 285,564 (9,519 per game)
- Scoring leader: (Soviet Union) Alexander Maltsev 22 points

The 1972 Ice Hockey World Championships was the 39th edition of the Ice Hockey World Championships. The tournament was held in Prague, Czechoslovakia from 7 to 22 April 1972, and the Czechoslovakia national team won the tournament, the third time they had done so and first since 1949, ending the Soviet Union's streak of nine consecutive titles. In addition it was the Czechoslovaks' 12th European title.

For the first time, a separate tournament is held for both the World Championships and the Winter Olympics. Previously, the Olympic tournament was held in lieu of a world championships, with the winner being declared world champion for that year. It also marked the first time in international ice hockey that all goaltenders were required to wear face masks.

The American team, who had won the silver medal earlier in the year at the Olympics, failed to win the 'B' pool, losing to Poland in their final game.

== World Championship Group A (Czechoslovakia) ==
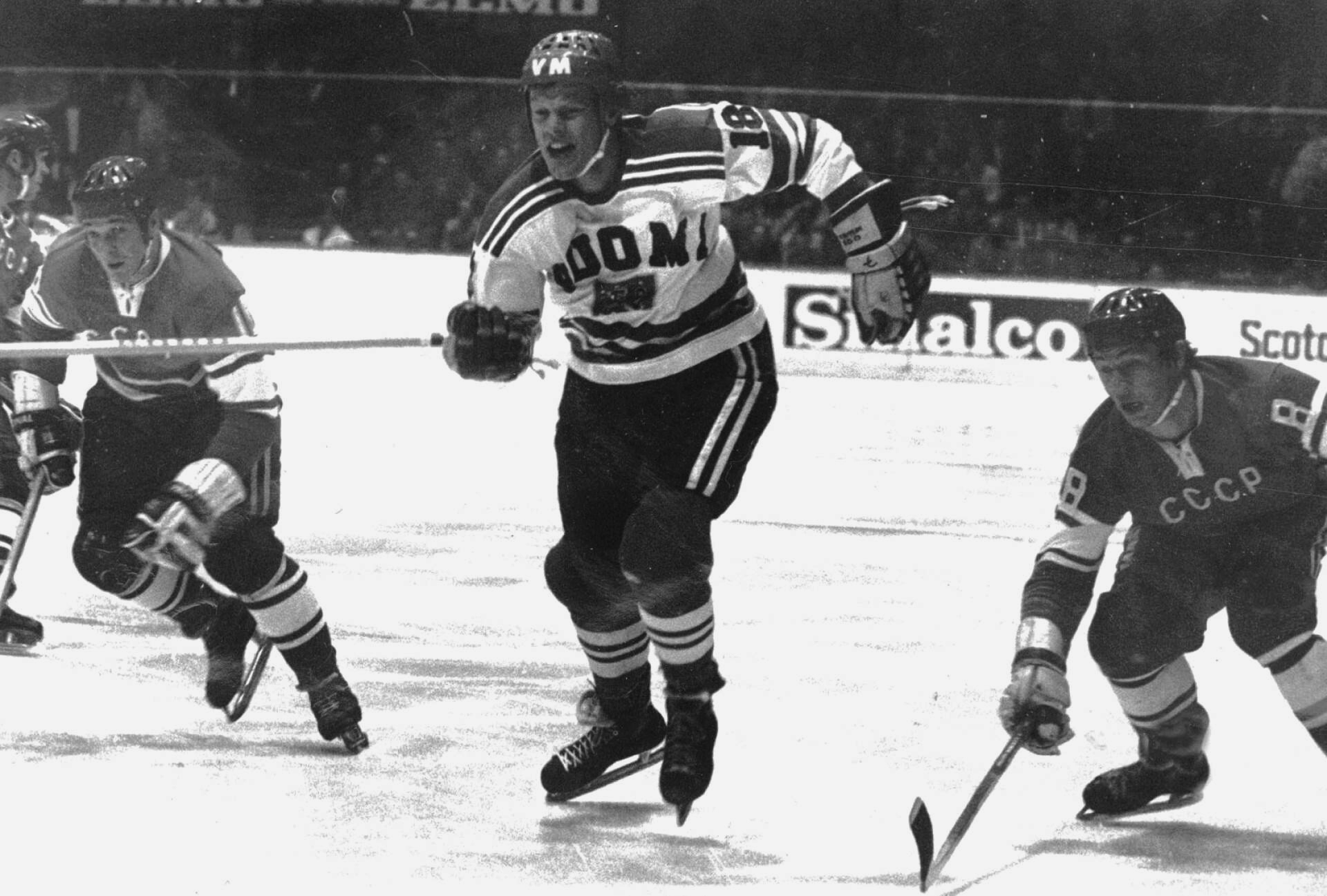
Finland–Soviet Union game in Prague. Alexander Maltsev (left side), Valeri Vasiliev (right side) and Lauri Mononen (middle) are pictured.

| Pos | Team | Pld | W | L | D | GF | GA | GD | Pts |
|---|---|---|---|---|---|---|---|---|---|
| 1 | Czechoslovakia | 10 | 9 | 0 | 1 | 72 | 16 | +56 | 19 |
| 2 | Soviet Union | 10 | 7 | 1 | 2 | 78 | 17 | +61 | 16 |
| 3 | Sweden | 10 | 5 | 4 | 1 | 49 | 33 | +16 | 11 |
| 4 | Finland | 10 | 4 | 6 | 0 | 47 | 48 | −1 | 8 |
| 5 | West Germany | 10 | 2 | 8 | 0 | 21 | 76 | −55 | 4 |
| 6 | Switzerland | 10 | 1 | 9 | 0 | 19 | 96 | −77 | 2 |

| 7 April | Czechoslovakia | 19–1 | Switzerland |

| 7 April | Soviet Union | 11–0 | West Germany |

| 8 April | Switzerland | 1–12 | Sweden |

| 8 April | West Germany | 5–8 | Finland |

| 9 April | Czechoslovakia | 4–1 | Sweden |

| 9 April | Finland | 2–10 | Soviet Union |

| 10 April | Czechoslovakia | 8–1 | West Germany |

| 10 April | Soviet Union | 10–2 | Switzerland |

| 11 April | West Germany | 0–10 | Sweden |

| 11 April | Switzerland | 3–2 | Finland |

| 12 April | Finland | 1–2 | Sweden |

| 12 April | Czechoslovakia | 3–3 | Soviet Union |

| 13 April | Switzerland | 3–6 | West Germany |

| 14 April | Sweden | 2–11 | Soviet Union |

| 14 April | Czechoslovakia | 5–3 | Finland |

| 15 April | Czechoslovakia | 12–2 | Switzerland |

| 15 April | West Germany | 0–7 | Soviet Union |

| 16 April | Sweden | 8–5 | Switzerland |

| 16 April | Finland | 13–3 | West Germany |

| 17 April | Soviet Union | 7–2 | Finland |

| 17 April | Czechoslovakia | 2–0 | Sweden |

| 18 April | Czechoslovakia | 8–1 | West Germany |

| 18 April | Switzerland | 0–14 | Soviet Union |

| 19 April | Sweden | 7–1 | West Germany |

| 19 April | Finland | 9–1 | Switzerland |

| 20 April | Sweden | 4–5 | Finland |

| 20 April | Czechoslovakia | 3–2 | Soviet Union |

| 21 April | West Germany | 4–1 | Switzerland |

| 22 April | Czechoslovakia | 8–2 | Finland |

| 22 April | Soviet Union | 3–3 | Sweden |

== World Championship Group B (Romania) ==
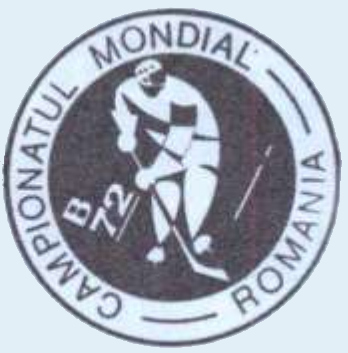

Played in Bucharest from 24 March to 2 April.

| Pos | Team | Pld | W | L | D | GF | GA | GD | Pts |
|---|---|---|---|---|---|---|---|---|---|
| 7 | Poland | 6 | 6 | 0 | 0 | 41 | 12 | +29 | 12 |
| 8 | United States | 6 | 5 | 1 | 0 | 39 | 22 | +17 | 10 |
| 9 | East Germany | 6 | 4 | 2 | 0 | 31 | 18 | +13 | 8 |
| 10 | Romania | 6 | 3 | 3 | 0 | 25 | 26 | −1 | 6 |
| 11 | Japan | 6 | 1 | 4 | 1 | 20 | 49 | −29 | 3 |
| 12 | Yugoslavia | 6 | 1 | 5 | 0 | 25 | 28 | −3 | 2 |
| 13 | Norway | 6 | 0 | 5 | 1 | 15 | 41 | −26 | 1 |

Poland was promoted to Group A, both Norway and France were relegated to Group C. The French team boycotted the tournament in a protest over their federation's failure to finance the team's participation in the Sapporo Olympics

| 24 March | United States | 5–3 | Yugoslavia |

| 24 March | Poland | 9–1 | Norway |

| 24 March | East Germany | 7–1 | Japan |

| 25 March | Romania | 3–2 | Yugoslavia |

| 26 March | East Germany | 5–2 | Norway |

| 26 March | United States | 14–5 | Japan |

| 27 March | Romania | 7–2 | Norway |

| 27 March | Poland | 11–1 | Japan |

| 27 March | East Germany | 4–3 | Yugoslavia |

| 29 March | United States | 6–5 | East Germany |

| 29 March | Japan | 4–4 | Norway |

| 29 March | Romania | 0–7 | Poland |

| 30 March | Romania | 3–8 | East Germany |

| 30 March | United States | 5–1 | Norway |

| 30 March | Poland | 5–3 | Yugoslavia |

| 1 April | Romania | 10–3 | Japan |

| 1 April | Yugoslavia | 11–5 | Norway |

| 1 April | Poland | 6–5 | United States |

| 2 April | Japan | 6–3 | Yugoslavia |

| 2 April | Romania | 2–4 | United States |

| 2 April | Poland | 3–2 | East Germany |

== World Championship Group C (Romania) ==
Played in Miercurea-Ciuc from 3 March to the 12th. The Chinese won their first game ever played in a World Championship.

| Pos | Team | Pld | W | L | D | GF | GA | GD | Pts |
|---|---|---|---|---|---|---|---|---|---|
| 14 | Austria | 6 | 5 | 0 | 1 | 21 | 12 | +9 | 11 |
| 15 | Italy | 6 | 4 | 1 | 1 | 31 | 13 | +18 | 9 |
| 16 | China | 6 | 2 | 2 | 2 | 19 | 20 | −1 | 6 |
| 17 | Bulgaria | 6 | 3 | 3 | 0 | 20 | 19 | +1 | 6 |
| 18 | Hungary | 6 | 2 | 2 | 2 | 31 | 24 | +7 | 6 |
| 19 | Denmark | 6 | 1 | 5 | 0 | 11 | 33 | −22 | 2 |
| 20 | Netherlands | 6 | 1 | 5 | 0 | 13 | 25 | −12 | 2 |

Both Austria and Italy were promoted to Group B.

| 3 March | China | 4–3 | Bulgaria |

| 3 March | Hungary | 11–4 | Denmark |

| 4 March | Italy | 3–1 | Netherlands |

| 4 March | Austria | 4–2 | Denmark |

| 5 March | Italy | 6–2 | Bulgaria |

| 5 March | Netherlands | 4–3 | China |

| 6 March | Bulgaria | 6–2 | Hungary |

| 6 March | China | 6–1 | Denmark |

| 6 March | Austria | 4–2 | Netherlands |

| 8 March | Italy | 7–1 | China |

| 8 March | Austria | 4–3 | Hungary |

| 8 March | Bulgaria | 5–3 | Netherlands |

| 9 March | Italy | 8–0 | Denmark |

| 9 March | Austria | 4–2 | Bulgaria |

| 9 March | Hungary | 6–1 | Netherlands |

| 11 March | China | 2–2 | Austria |

| 11 March | Denmark | 4–2 | Netherlands |

| 11 March | Hungary | 6–6 | Italy |

| 12 March | Bulgaria | 2–0 | Denmark |

| 12 March | Hungary | 3–3 | China |

| 12 March | Austria | 3–1 | Italy |

== Ranking and statistics ==
1972 IIHF World Championship winners

Czechoslovakia
3rd title

=== Tournament Awards ===
- Best players selected by the directorate:
  - Best Goaltender: (Finland) Jorma Valtonen
  - Best Defenceman: (Czechoslovakia) František Pospíšil
  - Best Forward: (Soviet Union) Alexander Maltsev
- Media All-Star Team:
  - Goaltender: (Czechoslovakia) Jiří Holeček
  - Defence: (Czechoslovakia) Oldřich Machač, (Czechoslovakia) František Pospíšil
  - Forwards: (Soviet Union) Valeri Kharlamov, (Soviet Union) Alexander Maltsev, (Soviet Union) Vladimir Vikulov

=== Final standings ===
The final standings of the tournament according to IIHF:

| 1st place, gold medalist(s) | Czechoslovakia |
| 2nd place, silver medalist(s) | Soviet Union |
| 3rd place, bronze medalist(s) | Sweden |
| 4 | Finland |
| 5 | West Germany |
| 6 | Switzerland |

=== European championships final standings ===
The final standings of the European championships according to IIHF:

| Gold medal | Czechoslovakia |
| Silver medal | Soviet Union |
| Bronze medal | Sweden |
| 4 | Finland |
| 5 | West Germany |
| 6 | Switzerland |
