= List of members of the IIHF Hall of Fame =

List of indcutees into the IIHF Hall of Fame

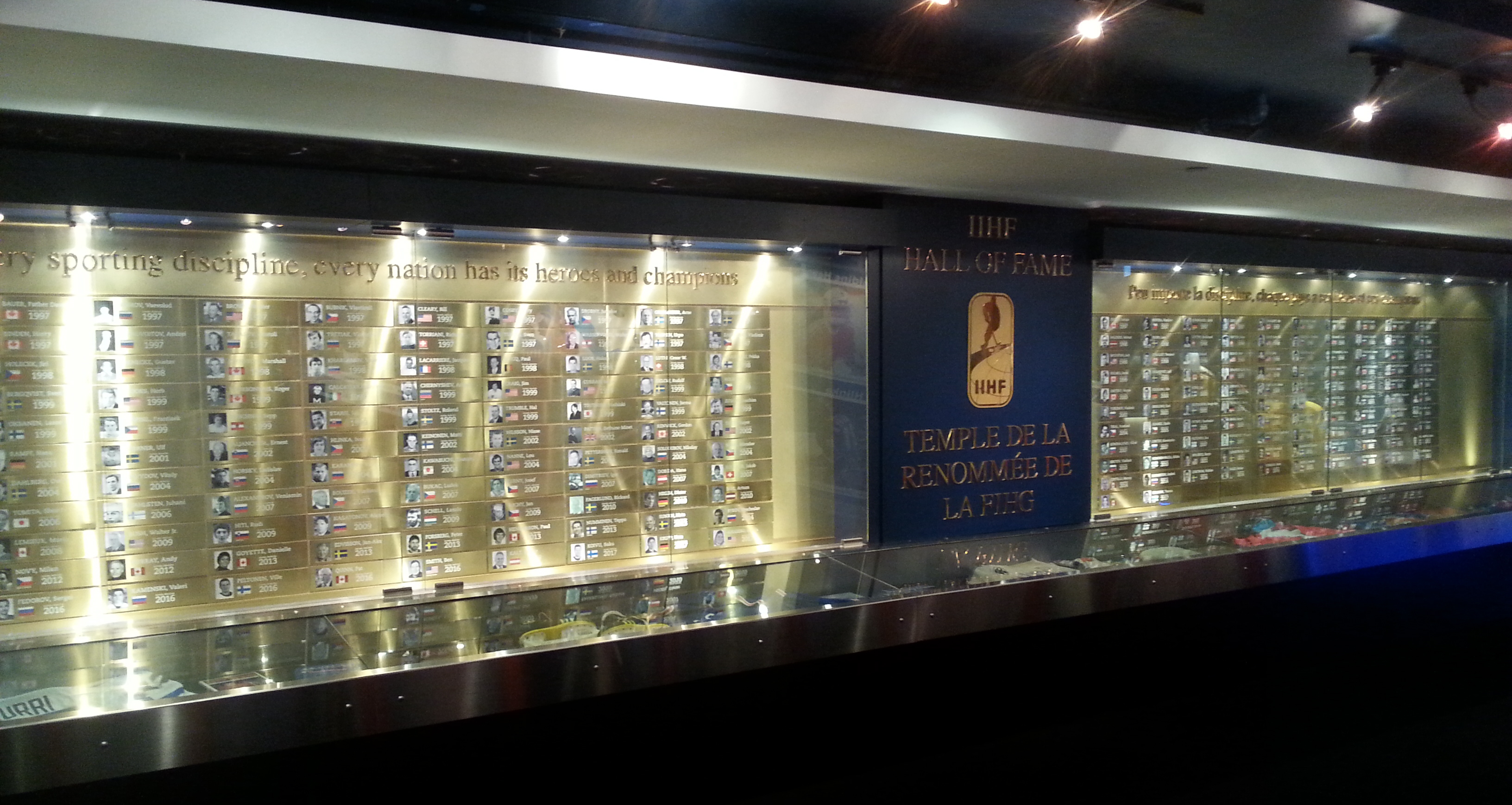
IIHF Hall of Fame honor roll

In 1997 the International Ice Hockey Federation (IIHF) established the IIHF Hall of Fame in Zürich, Switzerland. The IIHF Hall of Fame is intended to honor individuals who have made valuable contributions both internationally and in their home countries. The first class, which was composed of Paul Loicq, plus 30 other individuals, was introduced during the 1997 World Championships in Helsinki, Finland. The IIHF established the Torriani Award in 2015, which is given annually to a player with an "outstanding career from non-top hockey nation". Members are inducted into the Hall into four separate categories: player, referee, builder (an individual that "manages" or grows the game), and the Torriani Award.

The IIHF and the Hockey Hall of Fame in Toronto, Ontario, Canada, agreed on a long-term contract whereby the Hockey Hall of Fame became the permanent residence for the IIHF Hall of Fame. On 29 June 1998, the Hockey Hall of Fame opened its newly revamped Exhibition Center containing an international area known as the World of Hockey Zone, which houses the exhibits for the IIHF Hall of Fame. The IIHF also recognizes individuals with the Paul Loicq Award, presented to a person who has made "outstanding contributions to the IIHF and international ice hockey". Recipients of the Paul Loicq Award are not included in the list of inductees into the Hall of Fame. There are 269 inductees as of 2026.

== Members ==
List of the 269 inductees into the IIHF Hall of Fame as of 2026. (Note: 261 IIHF Hall of Fame inductees as of 2025.) (Note: Eight additional inductees in 2026; including six into the player category, one into the builder category, and one into Torriani Award category.)

Name	Country	Category	Year elected
Quido Adamec	Czech Republic	Referee	2005
Bunny Ahearne	Great Britain	Builder	1997
Boris Alexandrov	Kazakhstan	Builder	2019
Veniamin Alexandrov	Russia	Player	2007
Daniel Alfredsson	Sweden	Player	2018
Ernest Aljančič	Slovenia	Player	2002
Andres Ambühl	Switzerland	Player	2026
Helmuts Balderis	Latvia	Player	1998
Rudi Ball	Germany	Player	2004
Fr. David Bauer	Canada	Builder	1997
Patrice Bergeron	Canada	Player	2026
Art Berglund	United States	Builder	2008
Curt Berglund	Sweden	Builder	2003
Sven Bergqvist	Sweden	Player	1999
Ron Berteling	Netherlands	Torriani Award	2020/2022 (Note: The 2020 induction ceremony was scheduled during the 2020 IIHF World Championship, but was delayed due to the COVID-19 pandemic. The IIHF Hall of Fame class of 2020/2022 was inducted during the 2022 IIHF World Championship.)
Lasse Björn	Sweden	Player	1998
Rob Blake	Canada	Player	2018
Vsevolod Bobrov	Russia	Player	1997
Peter Bondra	Slovakia	Player	2016
Roger Bourbonnais	Canada	Player	1999
Vladimír Bouzek	Czech Republic	Player	2007
Philippe Bozon	France	Player	2008
Herb Brooks	United States	Builder	1999
Walter A. Brown	United States	Builder	1997
Vlastimil Bubník	Czech Republic	Player	1997
Mike Buckna	Canada	Builder	2004
Luděk Bukač	Czech Republic	Builder	2007
Pavel Bure	Russia	Player	2012
Walter Bush Jr.	United States	Builder	2009
Karyn Bye	United States	Player	2011
Vyacheslav Bykov	Russia	Player	2014
Enrico Calcaterra	Italy	Builder	1999
Cassie Campbell-Pascall	Canada	Player	2026
Ferdinand Cattini	Switzerland	Player	1998
Hans Cattini	Switzerland	Player	1998
Josef Černý	Czech Republic	Player	2007
Zdeno Chára	Slovakia	Player	2025
Chris Chelios	United States	Player	2018
Arkady Chernyshev	Russia	Builder	1999
Bill Christian	United States	Player	1998
Mong-won Chung	South Korea	Builder	2020/2022
Bill Cleary	United States	Player	1997
Gerry Cosby	United States	Player	1997
Murray Costello	Canada	Builder	2014
Jim Craig	United States	Player	1999
Mike Curran	United States	Player	1999
Ove Dahlberg	Sweden	Referee	2004
Jesper Damgaard	Denmark	Torriani Award	2018
Natalie Darwitz	United States	Player	2024
Melody Davidson	Canada	Builder	2024
Vitali Davydov	Russia	Player	2004
Igor Dmitriev	Russia	Builder	2007
Hans Dobida	Austria	Builder	2007
Sandra Dombrowski	Switzerland	Referee	2023
Jaroslav Drobný	Czech Republic	Player	1997
Vladimír Dzurilla	Slovakia	Player	1998
Jan-Åke Edvinsson	Sweden	Builder	2013
Rudolf Eklöw	Sweden	Builder	1999
Carl Erhardt	Great Britain	Player	1998
Rickard Fagerlund	Sweden	Builder	2010
René Fasel	Switzerland	Builder	2021
Sergei Fedorov	Russia	Player	2016
Viacheslav Fetisov	Russia	Player	2005
Anatoli Firsov	Russia	Player	1998
Peter Forsberg	Sweden	Player	2013
James Foster	Great Britain	Player	2023
Jozef Golonka	Slovakia	Player	1998
Danielle Goyette	Canada	Player	2013
Cammi Granato	United States	Player	2008
Wayne Gretzky	Canada	Player	2000
Arne Grunander	Sweden	Builder	1997
Henryk Gruth	Poland	Player	2006
Bengt-Åke Gustafsson	Sweden	Player	2003
Karel Gut	Czech Republic	Player	1998
Tony Hand	Great Britain	Torriani Award	2017
Dominik Hašek	Czech Republic	Player	2015
Geraldine Heaney	Canada	Player	2008
Anders Hedberg	Sweden	Player	1997
Dieter Hegen	Germany	Player	2010
Raimo Helminen	Finland	Player	2012
Paul Henderson	Canada	Player	2013
Heinz Henschel	Germany	Builder	2003
W. A. Hewitt	Canada	Builder	1998
Kai Hietarinta	Finland	Builder	2025
Rudi Hiti	Slovenia	Player	2009
Ivan Hlinka	Czech Republic	Player	2002
Jiří Holeček	Czech Republic	Player	1998
Jiří Holík	Czech Republic	Player	1999
Derek Holmes	Canada	Builder	1999
Leif Holmqvist	Sweden	Player	1999
Ladislav Horský	Slovakia	Builder	2004
Phil Housley	United States	Player	2012
Fran Huck	Canada	Player	1999
Cristobal Huet	France	Player	2023
Jørgen Hviid	Denmark	Builder	2005
Artūrs Irbe	Latvia	Player	2010
Gustav Jaenecke	Germany	Player	1998
Jaromír Jágr	Czech Republic	Player	2024
Angela James	Canada	Player	2008
Tore Johannessen	Norway	Builder	1999
Mark Johnson	United States	Player	1999
Marshall Johnston	Canada	Player	1998
Jörgen Jönsson	Sweden	Player	2019
Kenny Jönsson	Sweden	Player	2024
Tomas Jonsson	Sweden	Player	2000
Gordon Juckes	Canada	Builder	1997
Timo Jutila	Finland	Player	2003
Dieter Kalt Sr.	Austria	Builder	2017
Valeri Kamensky	Russia	Player	2016
Yury Karandin	Russia	Referee	2004
Alexei Kasatonov	Russia	Player	2009
Tsutomu Kawabuchi	Japan	Builder	2004
Matti Keinonen	Finland	Player	2002
Valeri Kharlamov	Russia	Player	1998
Andrei Khomutov	Russia	Player	2014
Anatoli Khorozov	Ukraine	Builder	2006
Udo Kießling	Germany	Player	2000
Dave King	Canada	Builder	2001
Saku Koivu	Finland	Player	2017
Jakob Kölliker	Switzerland	Player	2007
Josef Kompalla	Germany	Referee	2003
Viktor Konovalenko	Russia	Player	2007
Vladimír Kostka	Czech Republic	Builder	1997
Niklas Kronwall	Sweden	Player	2026
Ralph Krueger	Canada	Builder	2026
Uwe Krupp	Germany	Player	2017
Vladimir Krutov	Russia	Player	2010
Erich Kühnhackl	Germany	Player	1997
Kalervo Kummola	Finland	Builder	2023
Jari Kurri	Finland	Player	2000
Viktor Kuzkin	Russia	Player	2005
Jacques Lacarrière	France	Player	1998
Philippe Lacarrière	France	Builder	2018
Igor Larionov	Russia	Player	2008
Leszek Laszkiewicz	Poland	Torriani Award	2025
Robert Lebel	Canada	Builder	1997
Brian Leetch	United States	Player	2023
Jere Lehtinen	Finland	Player	2018
Mario Lemieux	Canada	Player	2008
Igor Liba	Slovakia	Player	2024
Nicklas Lidström	Sweden	Player	2014
Harry Lindblad	Finland	Builder	1999
Vic Lindquist	Canada	Player	1997
Paul Loicq	Belgium	Builder	1997
Konstantin Loktev	Russia	Player	2007
Håkan Loob	Sweden	Player	1998
Henrik Lundqvist	Sweden	Player	2025
Tord Lundström	Sweden	Player	2011
Cesar Lüthi	Switzerland	Builder	1998
Oldřich Machač	Czech Republic	Player	1999
Barry MacKenzie	Canada	Player	1999
Louis Magnus	France	Builder	1997
Sergei Makarov	Russia	Player	2001
Josef Maleček	Czech Republic	Player	2003
Alexander Maltsev	Russia	Player	1999
Pekka Marjamäki	Finland	Player	1998
Seth Martin	Canada	Player	1997
Kim Martin Hasson	Sweden	Player	2025
Vladimír Martinec	Czech Republic	Player	2001
John Mayasich	United States	Player	1997
Boris Mayorov	Russia	Player	1999
Jack McCartan	United States	Player	1998
Jackie McLeod	Canada	Player	1999
Konstantin Mihailov	Bulgaria	Torriani Award	2019
Boris Mikhailov	Russia	Player	2000
Mike Modano	United States	Player	2019
Bohumil Modrý	Czech Republic	Player	2011
Andy Murray	Canada	Builder	2012
Bob Nadin	Canada	Builder	2018
Lou Nanne	United States	Player	2004
Mats Näslund	Sweden	Player	2005
Václav Nedomanský	Czech Republic	Player	1997
Scott Niedermayer	Canada	Player	2015
Frans Nielsen	Denmark	Player	2025
Riikka Nieminen-Välilä	Finland	Player	2010
Kent Nilsson	Sweden	Player	2006
Nils Nilsson	Sweden	Player	2002
Milan Nový	Czech Republic	Player	2012
Petteri Nummelin	Finland	Player	2024
Kalevi Numminen	Finland	Builder	2011
Teppo Numminen	Finland	Player	2013
Gábor Ocskay	Hungary	Torriani Award	2016
Lasse Oksanen	Finland	Player	1999
Terry O'Malley	Canada	Player	1998
Caroline Ouellette	Canada	Player	2023
Žigmund Pálffy	Slovakia	Player	2019
Eduard Pană	Romania	Player	1998
György Pásztor	Hungary	Builder	2001
Peter Patton	Great Britain	Builder	2002
Esa Peltonen	Finland	Player	2007
Ville Peltonen	Finland	Player	2016
Vladimir Petrov	Russia	Player	2006
Ronald Pettersson	Sweden	Player	2004
František Pospíšil	Czech Republic	Player	1999
Jaroslav Pouzar	Czech Republic	Player	2024
Sepp Puschnig	Austria	Player	1999
Pat Quinn	Canada	Builder	2016
Alexander Ragulin	Russia	Player	1997
Hans Rampf	Germany	Player	2001
Robert Reichel	Czech Republic	Player	2015
Gord Renwick	Canada	Builder	2002
Robert Ridder	United States	Builder	1998
Fran Rider	Canada	Builder	2015
John P. Riley Jr.	United States	Builder	1998
Maria Rooth	Sweden	Player	2015
Angela Ruggiero	United States	Player	2017
Thomas Rundqvist	Sweden	Player	2007
Günther Sabetzki	Germany	Builder	1997
Joe Sakic	Canada	Player	2017
Ruslan Salei	Belarus	Player	2014
Börje Salming	Sweden	Player	1998
Miroslav Šatan	Slovakia	Player	2019
László Schell	Hungary	Referee	2009
Florence Schelling	Switzerland	Player	2026
Alois Schloder	Germany	Player	2005
Mathias Seger	Switzerland	Player	2020/2022
Teemu Selänne	Finland	Player	2017
Harry Sinden	Canada	Player	1997
Ben Smith	United States	Builder	2016
Ryan Smyth	Canada	Player	2020/2024 (Note: Smyth's induction was delayed until 2024 due to the COVID-19 pandemic.)
Nikolai Sologubov	Russia	Player	2004
Andrei Starovoytov	Russia	Builder	1997
Vyacheslav Starshinov	Russia	Player	2007
Ján Starší	Slovakia	Builder	1999
Peter Šťastný	Slovakia	Player	2000
Ulf Sterner	Sweden	Player	2001
Roland Stoltz	Sweden	Player	1999
Mark Streit	Switzerland	Player	2020/2022
Göran Stubb	Finland	Builder	2000
Arne Strömberg	Sweden	Builder	1998
Miroslav Šubrt	Czech Republic	Builder	2004
Jan Suchý	Czech Republic	Player	2009
Mats Sundin	Sweden	Player	2013
Vicky Sunohara	Canada	Player	2025
Viktor Szélig	Hungary	Torriani Award	2023
Anatoly Tarasov	Russia	Builder	1997
František Tikal	Czech Republic	Player	2004
Viktor Tikhonov	Russia	Builder	1998
Kimmo Timonen	Finland	Player	2020/2022
Zuzana Tomčíková	Slovakia	Torriani Award	2026
Shoichi Tomita	Japan	Builder	2006
Lucio Topatigh	Italy	Torriani Award	2015
Bibi Torriani	Switzerland	Player	1997
Vladislav Tretiak	Russia	Player	1997
Ladislav Troják	Slovakia	Player	2011
Hal Trumble	United States	Builder	1999
Yoshiaki Tsutsumi	Japan	Builder	1999
Sven Tumba	Sweden	Player	1997
Doru Tureanu	Romania	Player	2011
William Thayer Tutt	United States	Builder	2002
Xaver Unsinn	Germany	Builder	1998
Jorma Valtonen	Finland	Player	1999
Thomas Vanek	Austria	Player	2026
Dezső Varga	Romania	Torriani Award	2024
Valeri Vasiliev	Russia	Player	1998
David Výborný	Czech Republic	Player	2025
Juhani Wahlsten	Finland	Player	2006
Walter Wasservogel	Austria	Builder	1997
Harry Watson	Canada	Player	1998
Hayley Wickenheiser	Canada	Player	2019
Unto Wiitala	Finland	Referee	2003
Alexander Yakushev	Russia	Player	2003
Alexei Yashin	Russia	Player	2020/2022
Urpo Ylönen	Finland	Player	1997
Vladimir Yurzinov	Russia	Builder	2002
Steve Yzerman	Canada	Player	2014
Vladimír Zábrodský	Czech Republic	Player	1997
Henrik Zetterberg	Sweden	Player	2023
Joachim Ziesche	Germany	Player	1999

== Gallery ==
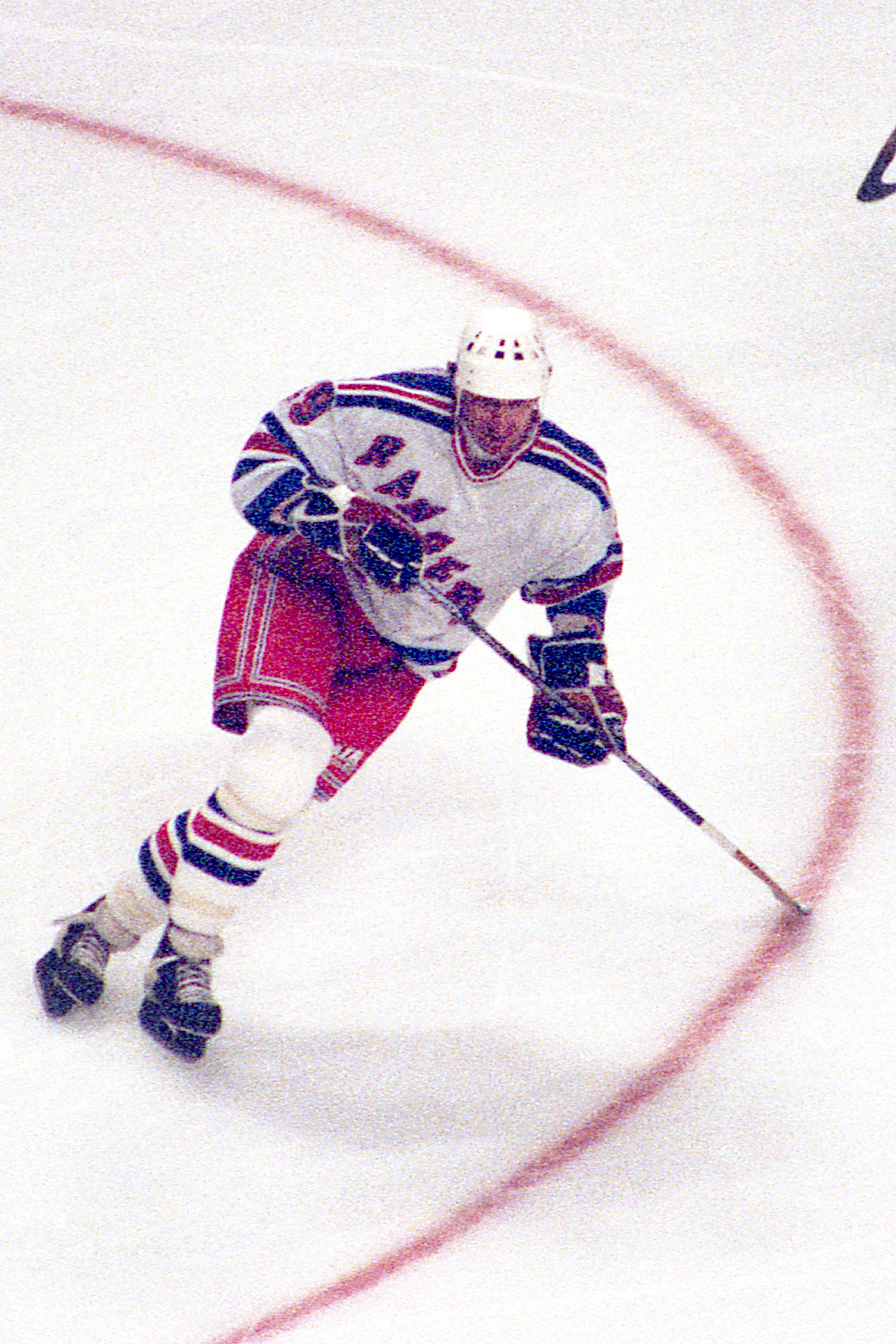
Wayne Gretzky was a part of three Canada Cup winning teams and the Executive director of Canada's 2002 Olympic team.

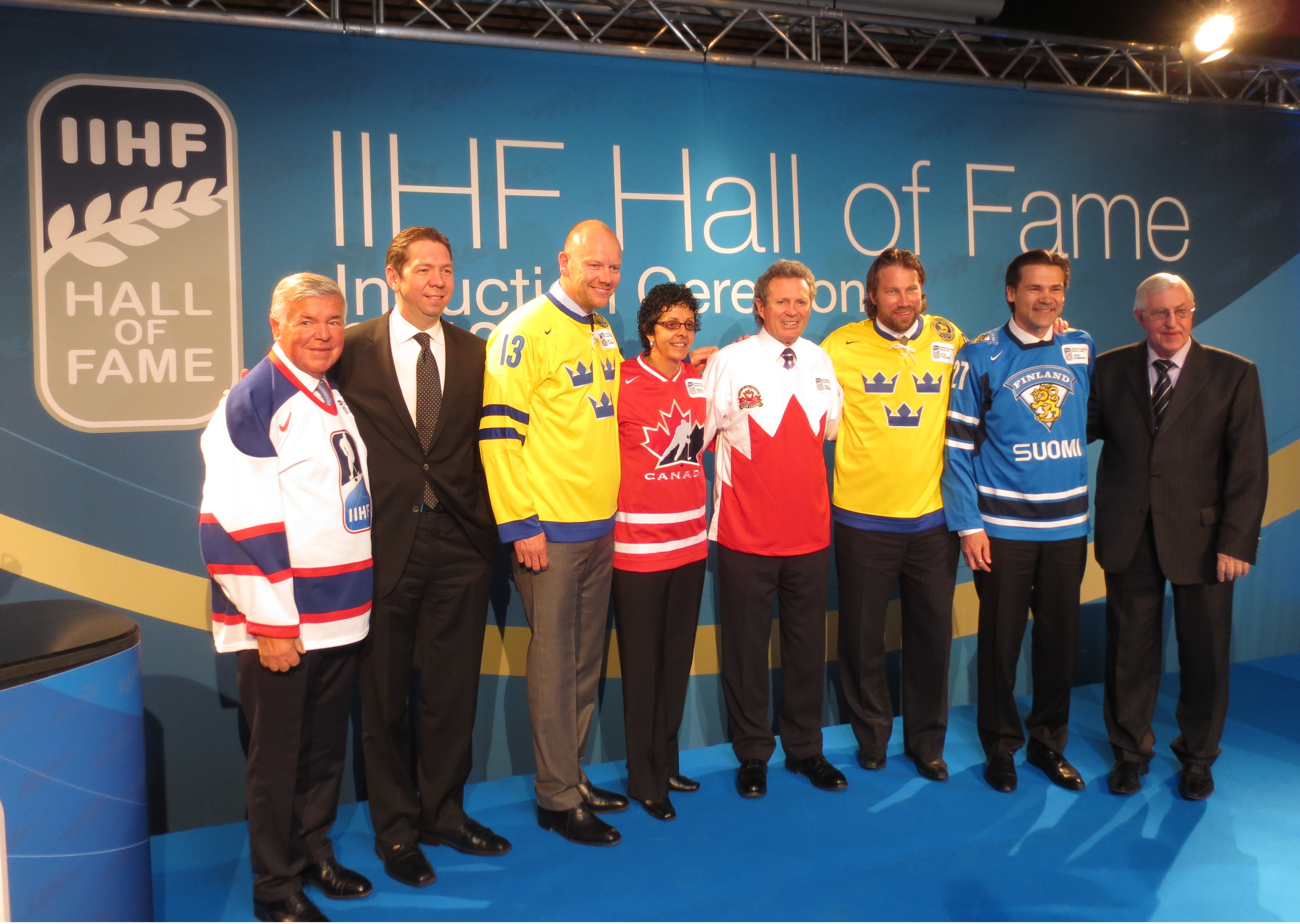
New members in 2013: Jan-Åke Edvinsson, Gord Miller, Mats Sundin, Danielle Goyette, Paul Henderson, Peter Forsberg and Teppo Numminen. Boris Mikhailov, member since 2000, on the right.

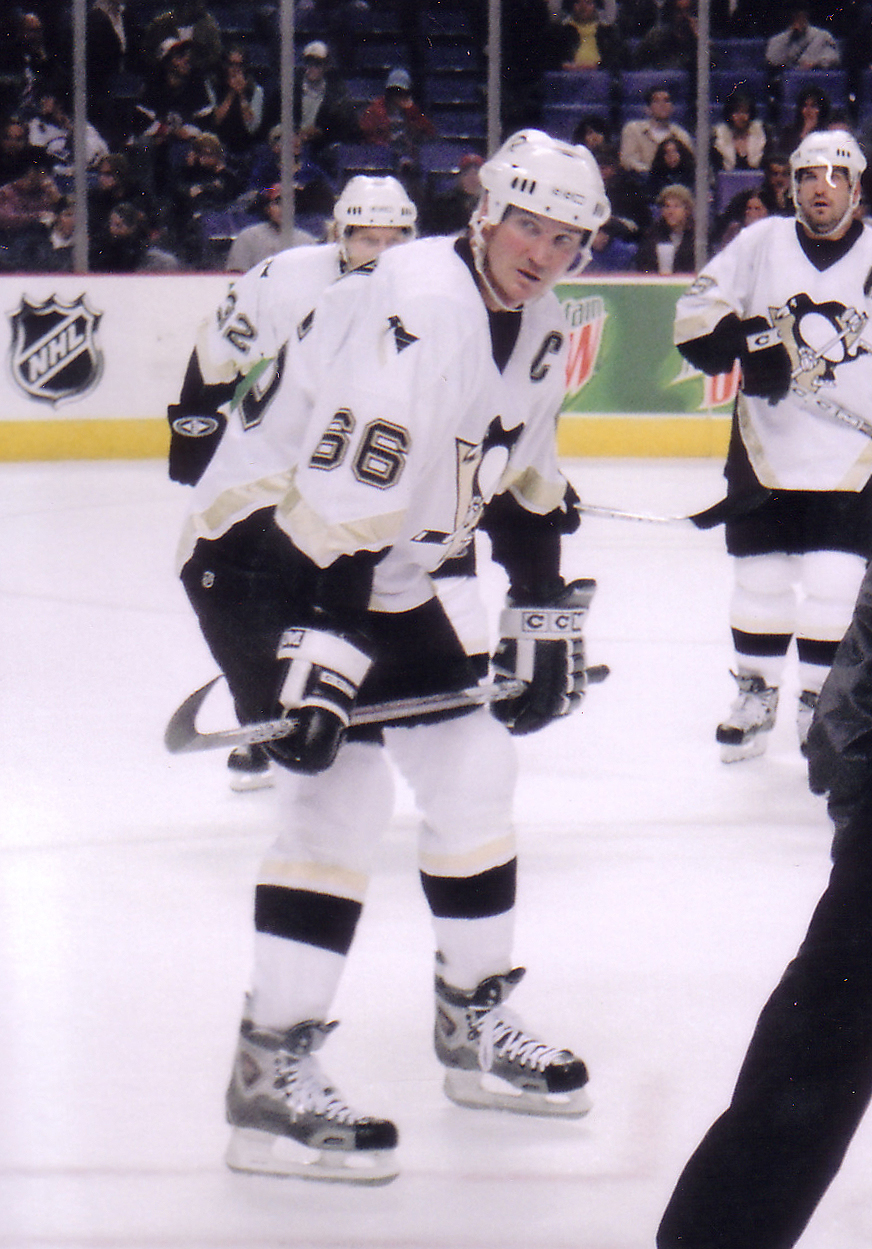
Mario Lemieux won a gold medal at the 2002 Winter Olympics.

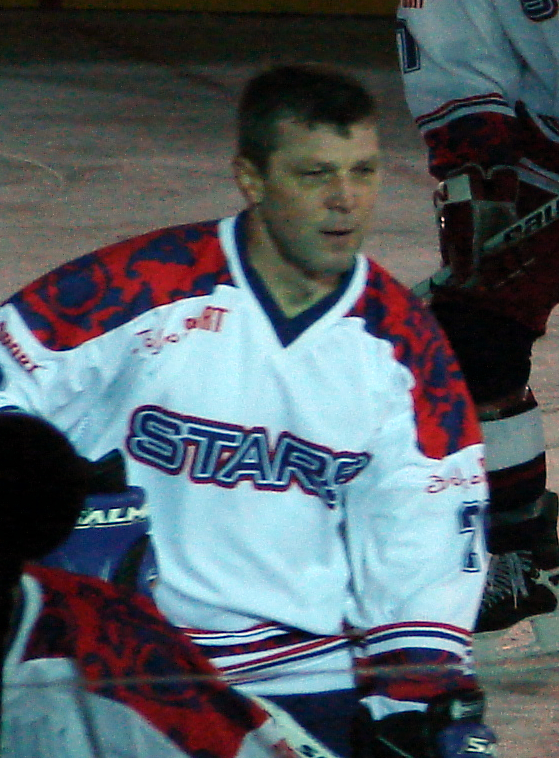
Peter Šťastný played for Czechoslovakia in the 1980 Olympics, for Slovakia in the 1994 Games and won the 1984 Canada Cup with Canada.

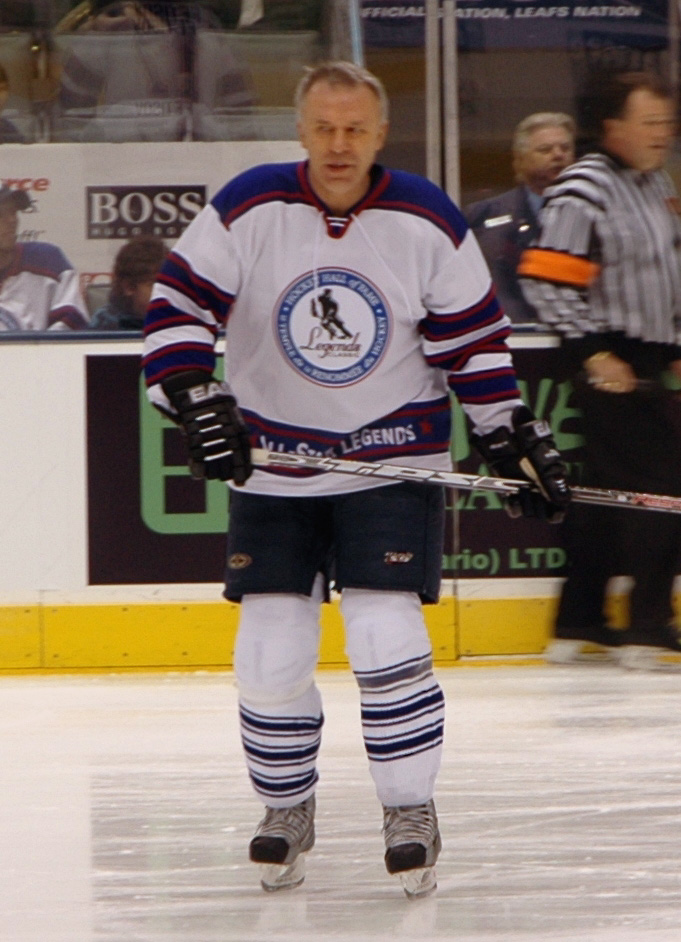
Slava Fetisov won Olympic gold medals in 1984 and 1988.

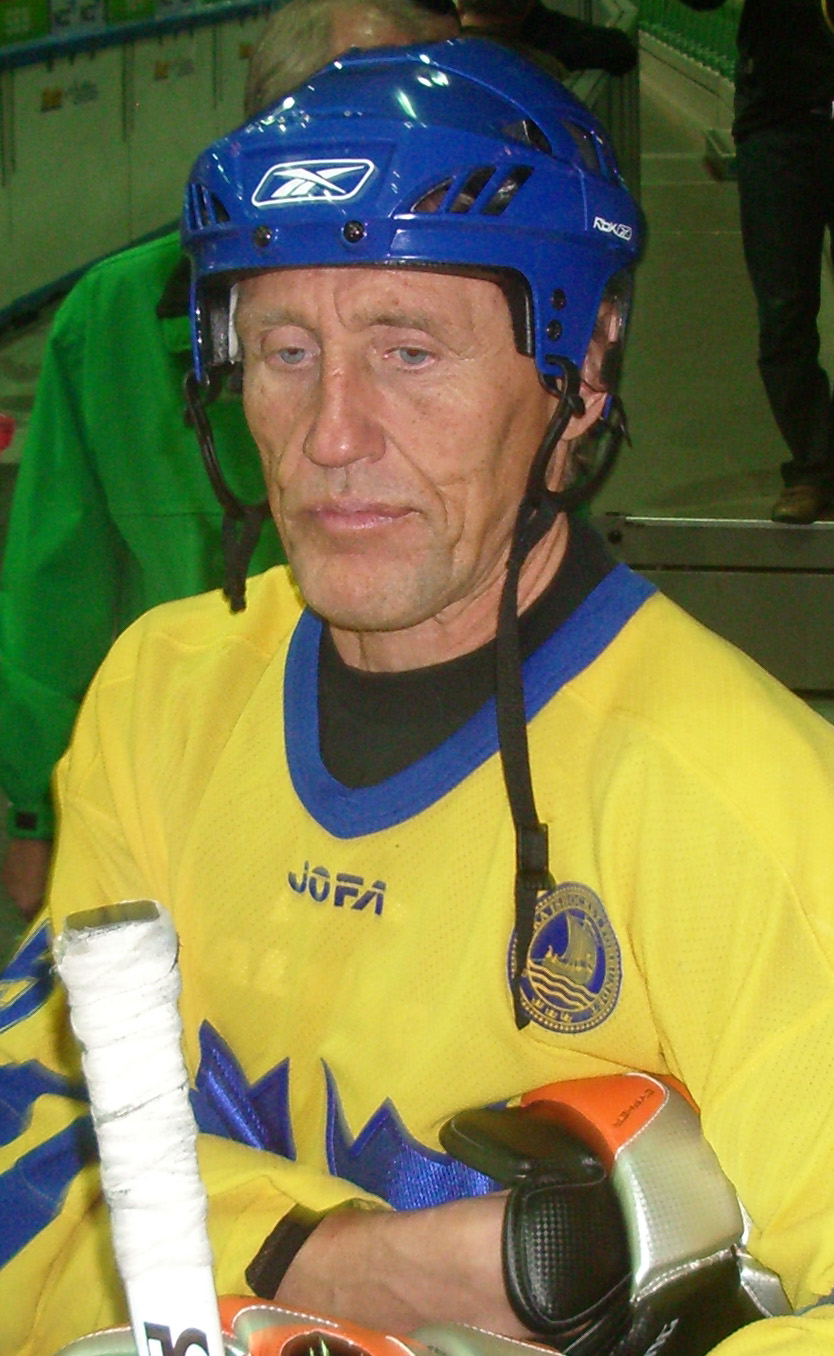
Börje Salming was inducted in 1998 for Sweden.

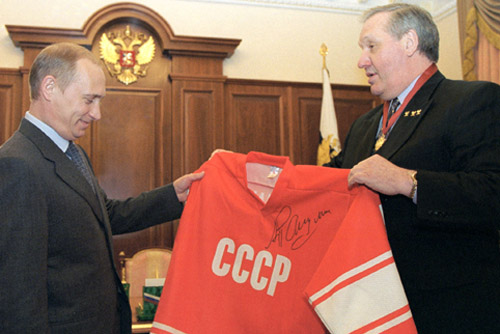
Alexander Ragulin (right) won a combined 13 gold medals in Olympic and World Championship play.

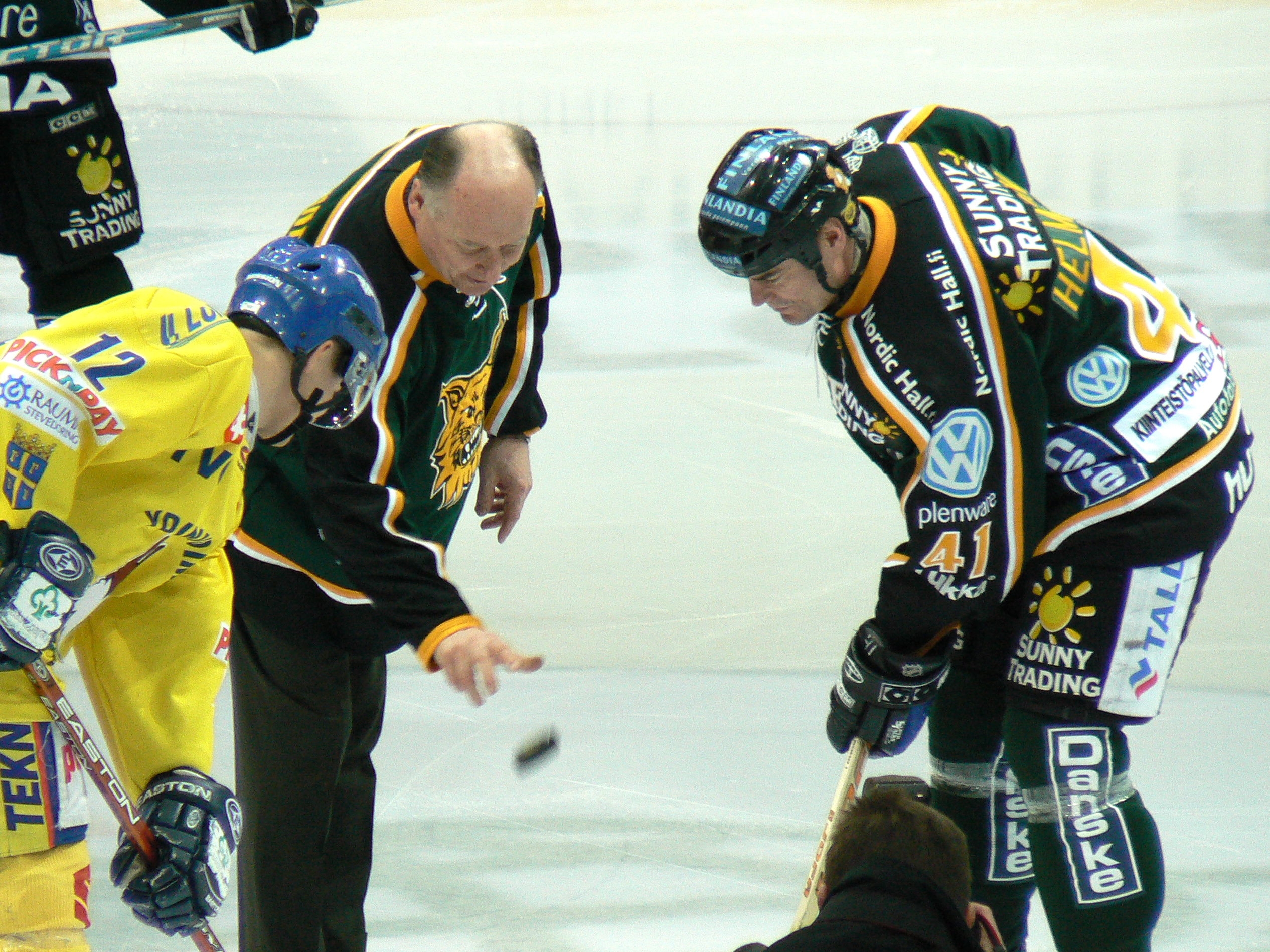
Lasse Oksanen (dropping the puck) was inducted in 1999 for Finland.

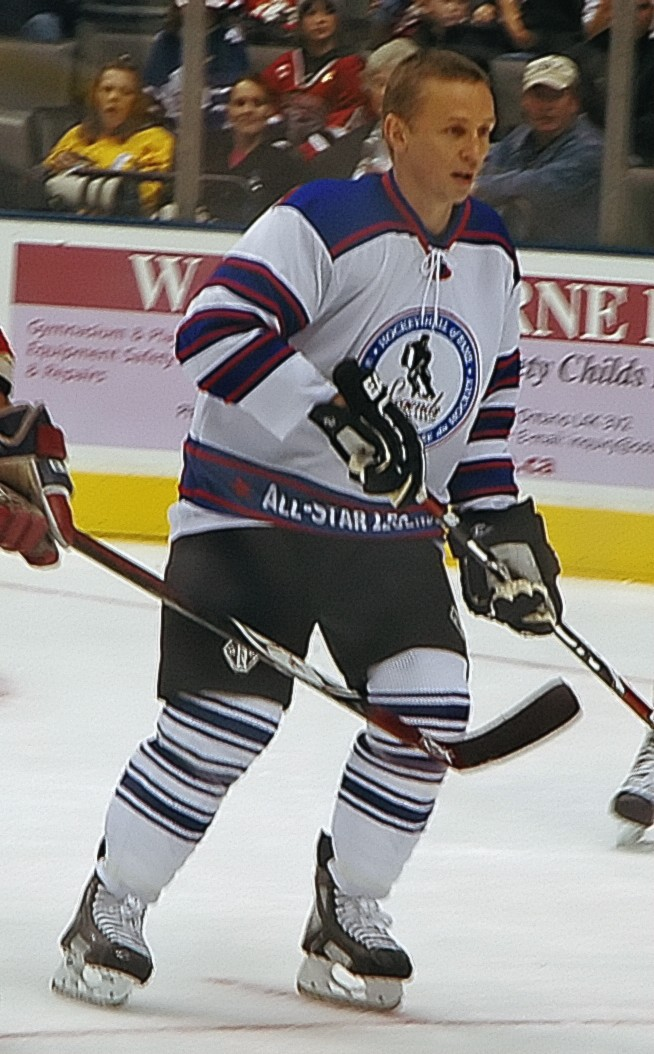
Igor Larionov is a member of the "Triple Gold Club".

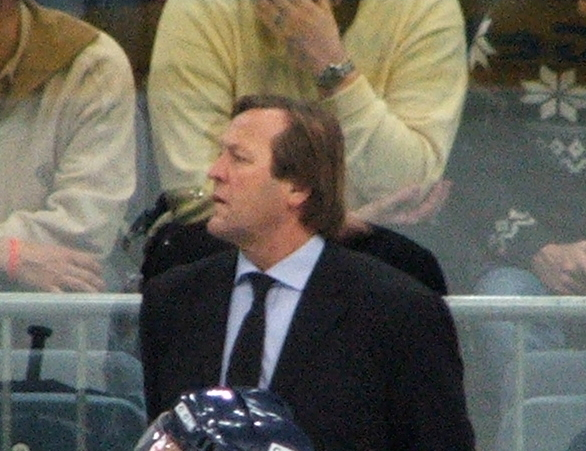
Erich Kühnhackl was part of the West Germany bronze medal winning team in 1976. One of three Olympic ice hockey medals for Germany.

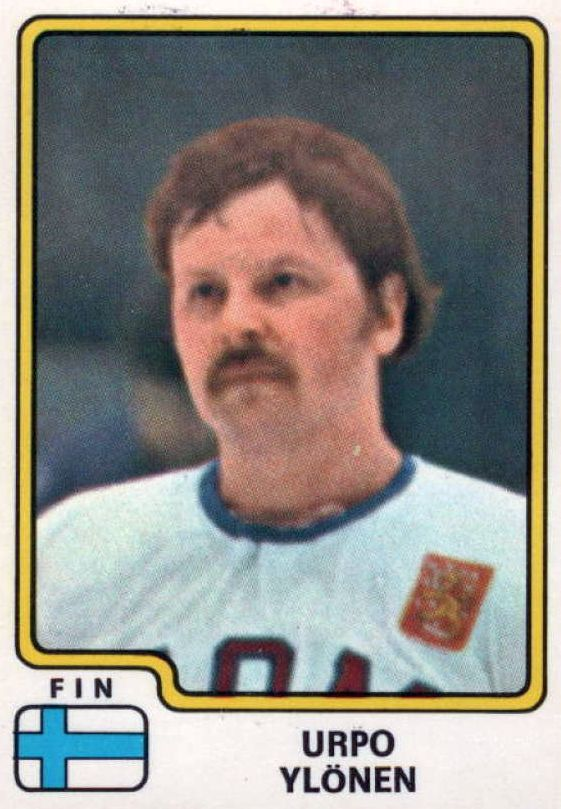
Urpo Ylönen was one of Finland's first top goalkeepers, in 60's and 70's. Ylönen played in the ninth World Championships and two Winter Olympics

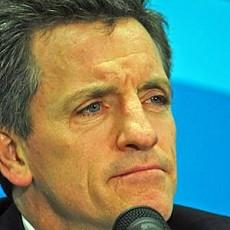
Mark Johnson won a gold medal in the 1980 Olympics and coached the USA women's team in the 2010 Games.

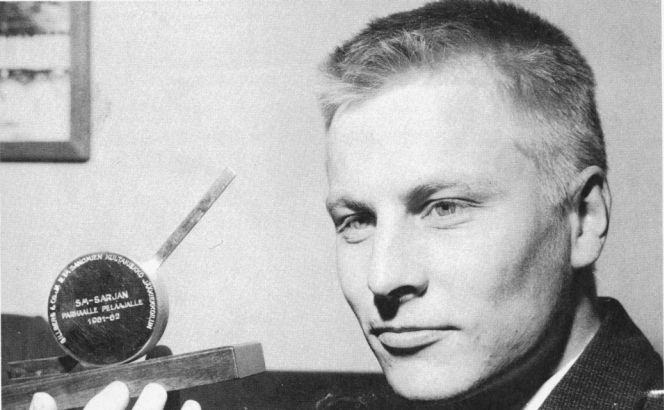
Juhani Wahlsten was inducted in 2006. Wahlsten played for Finland in the Winter Olympics in 1960, 1964, and 1968, and is also known as the "Father of Ringette" in Finland.

== Members by country ==
List of the 261 IIHF Hall of Fame members by country as of 2026:

Country	Members
Canada	41
Russia	36
Sweden	35
Czech Republic	27
United States	26
Finland	24
Germany	13
Slovakia	12
Switzerland	11
Austria	5
France	5
Great Britain	5
Hungary	4
Denmark	3
Japan	3
Romania	3
Italy	2
Latvia	2
Poland	2
Slovenia	2
Belarus	1
Belgium	1
Bulgaria	1
Kazakhstan	1
Netherlands	1
Norway	1
South Korea	1
Ukraine	1
