= Hans Dobida =

Austrian ice hockey administrator (1929–2025)

- Born: 13 May 1929; Graz, First Austrian Republic
- Died: 16 January 2025 (aged 95)
- Known for: Austrian Ice Hockey Association president, and International Ice Hockey Federation council member
- Awards: Austrian Decoration of Honour; IIHF Hall of Fame; German Ice Hockey Hall of Fame; Slovenian Hockey Hall of Fame

Hans Dobida (13 May 1929 – 16 January 2025) was an Austrian ice hockey administrator. Playing ice hockey and on the Austria men's national handball team in early life, he had a lengthy involvement with ATSE Graz while serving as president of the Austrian Ice Hockey Association. He helped Austria organize hosting ice hockey at the Olympic Games and the Ice Hockey World Championships; and as a member of the International Ice Hockey Federation (IIHF) council, oversaw the IIHF Continental Cup, and sat on the IIHF Inline Hockey World Championship committee. He was inducted into the IIHF Hall of Fame, the German Ice Hockey Hall of Fame, and the Slovenian Hockey Hall of Fame, and received the Decoration of Honour for Services to the Republic of Austria.

== Early life ==
Hans Dobida was born in Graz, on 13 May 1929. As a youth in Graz, he played both ice hockey and handball, and was a member of the Austria men's national handball team. Playing two sports was made possible due to shorter sport seasons at the time, and playing on natural ice outdoors in winters. He played for the ATSE Graz second-level team (ATUS Eggenberg) from 1950 to 1954, and served as head of section at ATSE Graz from 1947 to 1977. The club were Austrian Hockey League champions in 1975 and 1978, and became the first team based in Styria to win the national championship.

== Austrian Ice Hockey Association ==
Dobida became vice-president of the Austrian Ice Hockey Association in 1962, then took over as its president in 1977, when Walter Wasservogel moved on to international ice hockey. During this time, he served on the organizing committees when Austria hosted the 1964 and 1976 Winter Olympics; and the Ice Hockey World Championships in 1967, 1973, 1977, 1987 and 1996. He was also chairman of the 1970 IIHF European U19 Championship Group B hosted in Austria. He was proud of the 1973 event for which all games involving the Austria men's national team were sold out, with an over-capacity crowd in the final at Eisstadion Liebenau. He welcomed a new branch into the national association in 1994, when the Lower Austrian Ice Hockey Association separated from the Vienna branch. He retired as president of the Austrian Ice Hockey Association in 1996, and was succeeded by Dieter Kalt Sr. After retirement, he remained in an advisory role with ATSE Graz as of 2019.

In addition to his work with the Austrian Ice Hockey Association, Dobida was secretary of the Austrian Olympic Committee from 1989 to 1997. He was also a member of the Austrian Federal Sports Organization, the Association for Sport and Physical Culture in Austria, and the Styrian State Sports Organization.

== International Ice Hockey Federation ==
Dobida began in international hockey in 1977, as the delegate from the Austrian Ice Hockey Association to the International Ice Hockey Federation (IIHF). He later served on the IIHF council from 1986 to 2008, and was its treasurer from 1998 to 2008. He also served as an IIHF auditor, and participated in its strategic consulting group. He acted as chairman of approximately 50 tournaments including the Ice Hockey World Championships, and served as chairman of the IIHF Continental Cup until 2018. He was chairman of the 2008 IIHF Inline Hockey World Championship committee in Bratislava. He stated that the IIHF's roller in-line hockey program provided development opportunities for IIHF members, and has grown in popularity and credibility with organizational support from Walter Bush, and the participation of former National Hockey League players.

== Honors and awards ==
Dobida was named an honorary president of the Austrian Ice Hockey Association on 29 June 1996, and later an honorary member of the Austrian Olympic Committee. He was inducted into the German Ice Hockey Hall of Fame in 2004, and into the Slovenian Hockey Hall of Fame in the inaugural class of 2007. He was inducted into the IIHF Hall of Fame in 2007, in the builder category. The induction ceremony took place at the 2007 IIHF World Championship in Moscow. He was later made a life member of the IIHF in 2008. He was given the Panathlon International Award in 2011, as a founding member of Club Graz. He was also an honorary member of the Austrian Olympic Committee, and was a recipient of the "Gold Medal" class of the Decoration of Honour for Services to the Republic of Austria.

== Personal life ==
Dobida studied civil engineering, then was employed by an insurance company following in his father's work.

Dobida died on 16 January 2025, at age 95.
