= Luděk Bukač =

Czech ice hockey player and manager (1935–2019)

- Born: 4 August 1935 Ústí nad Labem, Czechoslovakia
- Died: 20 April 2019 (aged 83)
- Position: Centre
- Played for: ČLTK Praha; HC Sparta Praha; HC Dukla Jihlava
- National team: Czechoslovakia
- Playing career: 1949–1967

Luděk Bukač (4 August 1935 – 20 April 2019) was a Czech ice hockey player and manager. He died on 20 April 2019 at the age of 83.

As a player, Bukač played for ČLTK Praha, HC Sparta Praha and HC Dukla Jihlava, while as a manager, he coached HC Sparta Praha, HC Košice and HC České Budějovice.

As a coach, Bukač managed the Czechoslovak, Austrian, German, and Czech national teams; the latter of which won the 1996 IIHF World Championship. He was inducted into the IIHF Hall of Fame in 2023.
