= Vladimír Kostka =

Czech ice hockey player and coach (1922–2009)

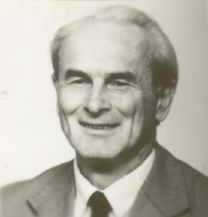
- Born: 20 August 1922; Třebíč, Czechoslovakia
- Died: 18 September 2009 (aged 87); Prague, Czech Republic
- Known for: Czechoslovakia men's national ice hockey team coach; President of the Czechoslovak Ice Hockey Federation
- Honors: Czech Ice Hockey Hall of Fame; IIHF Hall of Fame

Vladimír Kostka (20 August 1922 – 18 September 2009) was a Czech ice hockey coach and president of the Czechoslovak Ice Hockey Federation. Kostka was inducted into the IIHF Hall of Fame in 1997, and into the Czech Ice Hockey Hall of Fame in 2008.

After a career as a hockey player and professor, Kostka coached the Czechoslovakia men's national ice hockey team to a bronze medal at the 1968 Winter Olympics and a gold medal at the 1972 World Ice Hockey Championships. While with the team, Kostka invented the Left wing lock, a defensive ice hockey strategy which helped Czechoslovakia win numerous medals at the World Ice Hockey Championships.

== Career ==
Kostka began his hockey career as a player in the Czechoslovak league between 1938 and 1954. After finishing his minor career, Kostka lectured as a professor before joining the Czechoslovakia men's national ice hockey team as a member of the coaching staff in the late 1960s. While a professor, Kostka served as the Dean of the Faculty of Physical Education and Sports department at Charles University and was a Senate member for the university.

As a coach, Kostka led Czechoslovakia's national team to a gold medal at the 1972 World Ice Hockey Championships, multiple silver and bronze medals at the following World Championships, and a bronze medal at the 1968 Winter Olympics. The gold medal win at the 1972 World Championships halted the Soviet Unions record for most consecutive World Championship wins at nine.

Kostka is considered to be the inventor of the contemporary defensive ice hockey strategy called left wing lock. The technique involved moving the left-wingers beside the defensemen, creating an obstacle in the middle zone. This technique was used by the Czechoslovakia national team during the World Championships and later by Scotty Bowman with the Detroit Red Wings in the National Hockey League.

After retiring from coaching, Kostka was elected president of the Czechoslovak Ice Hockey Federation and joined the International Ice Hockey Federation (IIHF) coaches committee. He also used his coaching experience to write books about hockey strategy which have been translated into multiple languages. Kostka was inducted into the IIHF Hall of Fame in 1997, and into the Czech Ice Hockey Hall of Fame in 2008.
