= Bouzek =

Bouzek (feminine: Bouzková) is a Czech surname. It originated as a pet form of the Czech given names Budislav, Budivoj, etc. Notable people with the surname include:

- Marie Bouzková (born 1998), Czech tennis player
- Vladimír Bouzek (1920–2006), Czech ice hockey player
