= Walter Wasservogel =

Austrian ice hockey administrator (1919–1993)

- Born: 20 February 1919; Austria
- Died: 14 April 1993 (aged 74)
- Known for: Austrian Ice Hockey Association; International Ice Hockey Federation
- Awards: IIHF Hall of Fame; Olympic Order

Walter Wasservogel (20 February 1919 – 14 April 1993) was an Austrian ice hockey administrator. He served as president of the Austrian Ice Hockey Association and later as the general secretary of the International Ice Hockey Federation. He received the Olympic Order and was inducted into the IIHF Hall of Fame.

== Austrian career ==
Wasservogel was born 20 February 1919 in Austria, and won four national championships playing ice hockey there. He later joined the Austrian Ice Hockey Association in 1947, and served as its president from 1962 to 1977. He oversaw the organization of international ice hockey events hosted in Austria, which included the 1964 Winter Olympics, the 1967 World Ice Hockey Championships, the 1976 Winter Olympics and the 1977 World Ice Hockey Championships. In 1977, he undermined the International Olympic Committee's rules for amateur only players at World Ice Hockey Championships, and said that the participating players were really professionals instead of amateurs, and that ice hockey at the Winter Olympic Games would be finished within eight years unless professionals were accepted. He was succeeded as president of the Austrian Ice Hockey Association by Hans Dobida in 1977.

== International career ==
Wasservogel also served as a council member of the International Ice Hockey Federation (IIHF) from 1969 to 1978, and then became the first full-time general secretary of the IIHF, serving in the role from 1978 until 1986. When three players of the Poland men's national ice hockey team sought political asylum in Austria in 1982, he stated that the players would have to wait 18 months before playing in another country, unless the Polish Ice Hockey Federation released them.

== Later life and honors ==
Wasservogel was named an honorary president of the Austrian Ice Hockey Association in 1977, and received the Olympic Order in 1986. He was made a life member of the IIHF in 1986, and was posthumously inducted into the IIHF Hall of Fame as a builder in 1997.

Wasservogel died 14 April 1993.
