= Viktor Szélig =

Hungarian ice hockey player (born 1975)

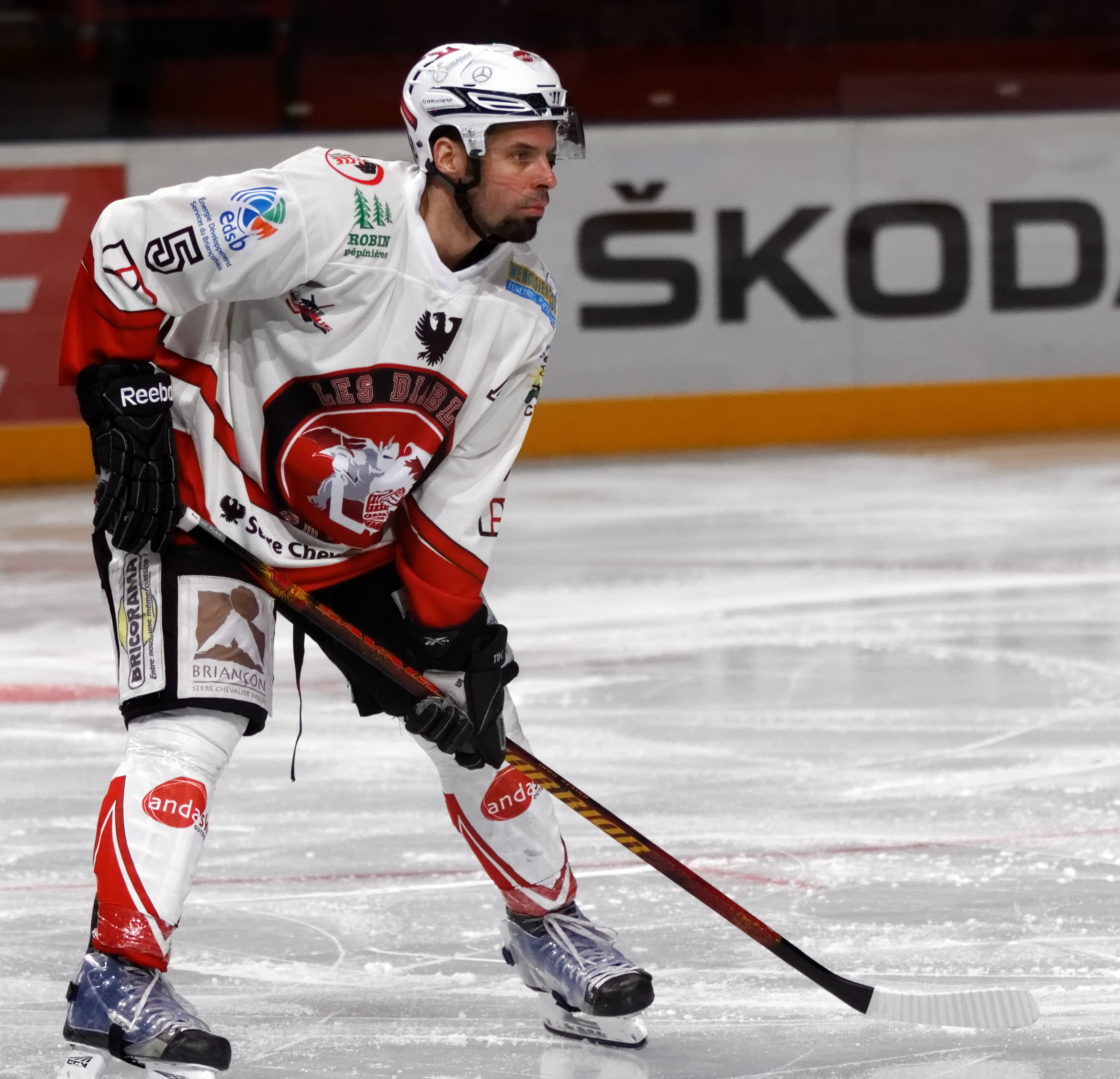
- Born: September 22, 1975 (age 50) Dunaújváros, Hungary
- Height: 6 ft 1 in (185 cm)
- Weight: 198 lb (90 kg; 14 st 2 lb)
- Position: Defence
- Shot: Right
- Played for: Dunaferr SE; Diables Rouges de Briançon
- National team: Hungary
- Playing career: 1994–2015

Viktor Szélig (born September 22, 1975) is a Hungarian former professional ice hockey defenceman. He was inducted into the IIHF Hall of Fame in 2023, as a recipient of the Torriani Award.

== Career ==
Szélig began his career with Dunaferr SE in the OB I bajnoksag in the 1994-95 season. He played with Dunaferr in the OB I bajnoksag, and the Interliga, until he joined Diables Rouges de Briançon in 2006. Szelig has played with Briancon for the last eight years.

During his international career, Szelig has participated in two IIHF European Junior Championships, three IIHF World U20 Championship, and seventeen IIHF World Championships since 1993.

Szélig was recognized with the Torriani Award from the International Ice Hockey Federation (IIHF) for his career in international ice hockey. The award also inducted him into the IIHF Hall of Fame.
