= Rita Hrbacek =

Austrian ice hockey administrator

Rita Hrbacek is an Austrian retired ice hockey administrator. She joined the Austrian Ice Hockey Association in 1964 working as a secretary until 1976. She then transferred to the International Ice Hockey Federation (IIHF) working as a secretary until 1983. She returned to the Austrian Ice Hockey Association as its secretary general in 1989. She retired her position on 31 May 2004 after 40 years of service to ice hockey, and was succeeded by Christian Hartl as the secretary general. The IIHF made Hrbacek the Paul Loicq Award recipient in 2005, for her services to international ice hockey.
