= Protectorate of Bohemia and Moravia men's national ice hockey team =

Protectorate of Bohemia and Moravia
- IIHF code: PBM

First international
- (Protectorate of Bohemia and Moravia) Bohemia and Moravia 5–1 (Nazi Germany) Germany (Prague, Bohemia and Moravia; 11 January 1940); Last international (Protectorate of Bohemia and Moravia) Bohemia and Moravia 2–1 Hungary (Prague, Bohemia and Moravia; 7 February 1940)

Biggest win
- (Protectorate of Bohemia and Moravia) Bohemia and Moravia 12–0 (Slovak Republic (1939–1945)) Slovakia (Garmisch-Partenkirchen, Germany; 1 February 1940)

Biggest defeat
- none

International record (W–L–T)
- 5–0–1

The Protectorate of Bohemia and Moravia national ice hockey team was the national men's ice hockey team of the German Protectorate of Bohemia and Moravia. The team competed in six exhibition matches between 11 January to 7 February 1940. The team was absorbed into the reformed Czechoslovakia men's national ice hockey team after the Protectorate was dissolved and became part of the third Czechoslovak Republic.

== History ==
The Protectorate of Bohemia and Moravia played its first game in January 1940 against Germany during an exhibition game being held in Prague, Protectorate of Bohemia and Moravia. The team won the game 5–1. The following month the team competed in five exhibition matches with three held in Garmisch-Partenkirchen, Germany, and the other two in Prague. Bohemia and Moravia's first game in Garmisch-Partenkirchen was against Slovakia which they won 12–0. This was recorded as Bohemia and Moravia's largest win in their short international participation. The other two games in Garmisch-Partenkirchen were against Italy and Hungary which they won 5–0 and 6–0 respectively. After their three games in Germany, the team returned to Prague to compete in a two-game series against Hungary. The first game ended in a 1–1 draw while Bohemia and Moravia won the second 2–1.

After playing their last game on 7 February 1940, the team was succeeded by the reformed Czechoslovakia men's national ice hockey team after the Protectorate of Bohemia and Moravia was dissolved and became part of the third Czechoslovak Republic.

== All-time record against other nations ==
Team	GP	W	T	L	GF	GA
Hungary	3	2	1	0	9	2
(Slovak Republic (1939–1945)) Slovakia	1	1	0	0	12	0
Italy	1	1	0	0	5	0
Germany	1	1	0	0	5	1
