= Jaroslav Walter =

Czech ice hockey player and coach

Medal record

Representing Czechoslovakia

Men's Ice Hockey
| Bronze medal – third place | 1964 Innsbruck | Team |

Jaroslav Walter (January 6, 1939 in Sobědraž (now part of Kostelec nad Vltavou), Czechoslovakia – June 20, 2014) was an ice hockey player who played for the Czechoslovak national team. He won a bronze medal at the 1964 Winter Olympics. Between 1991 and 1992, he served as assistant coach of the Czechoslovak national team.
