= Mike Buckna =

Canadian-Slovak ice hockey player and coach (1913–1996)

- Born: 5 September 1913; Trail, British Columbia, Canada
- Died: 6 January 1996 (aged 82); Trail, British Columbia, Canada
- Played for: Trail Smoke Eaters
- National team: Czechoslovakia

Mike Matthew Buckna (5 September 1913 – 6 January 1996) was a Canadian amateur ice hockey player and coach of Slovak origin. Between stints as a player with the Trail Smoke Eaters, Buckna was instrumental in developing hockey in Czechoslovakia throughout the 1930s and 1940s. Buckna established the sport at the grassroots level while coaching the Czechoslovak national team to European and World Championship titles, as well as a silver medal at the 1948 Olympics.

== Hockey career ==
Buckna began his career with his hometown amateur team, the Trail Smoke Eaters, in 1932. During his rookie year, he helped the team to a Savage Cup championship as the top provincial senior hockey team in British Columbia.

Two years later, Buckna went overseas to Prague, Czechoslovakia, to visit his parents' homeland. After joining LTC Praha's hockey club as player and coach, Buckna continued on in the same dual role with the Czechoslovak national team. Buckna led the country to back-to-back European titles in 1938 and 1939. He returned home due to the German occupation of Czechoslovakia as part of World War II.

Back in North America, he was offered a contract with the Chicago Blackhawks of the National Hockey League (NHL) after a successful tryout, but declined. He resumed playing with the Smoke Eaters and led the club with 66 points in 1941–42.

In 1946, Buckna moved back to Prague and was given authority over Czechoslovakia's entire hockey system. At the grassroots level, he established a minor hockey system, organized hockey clinics and coached junior and senior teams throughout the country. He resumed his head coaching position with the national team, leading them to the country's first ever World Championship title in 1947. The following year, he earned his third European title. At the 1948 Winter Olympics, the Czechoslovaks won a silver medal, losing only to Canada.

Buckna returned home from Czechoslovakia a second time shortly after the Olympics due to the 1948 Czechoslovak coup d'état and resumed playing for the Smoke Eaters. In his first year back, he won his Savage Cup with the team. After retiring as a player, he was offered a coaching position with the Canadian national team in 1956, but declined, going on to coach the Rossland Warriors and Junior Smoke Eaters instead.

== Personal life ==
Buckna was born in Trail, British Columbia to Slovak parents who emigrated to Canada from Podbiel, present-day Slovakia. He worked in his hometown with Cominco, a mining company, and in his family's hotel business. Buckna met his wife, Aloisie Frolikova, a European champion tennis player, while playing and coaching hockey in Czechoslovakia; they were married in Prague on March 26, 1938. Buckna returned to Trail with Frolikova the following year. Following his retirement from hockey, he and his wife bought his family's hotel business, operating it until 1974. Two years later, his wife died on November 29, 1976. Buckna continued to live in Trail until he died on January 6, 1996.

== Honours ==
- Inducted into the British Columbia Sports Hall of Fame (builder category) in 1989.
- Inducted into the International Ice Hockey Federation Hall of Fame (builder category) in 2004.
