= Karel Gut =

Czech ice hockey player and coach

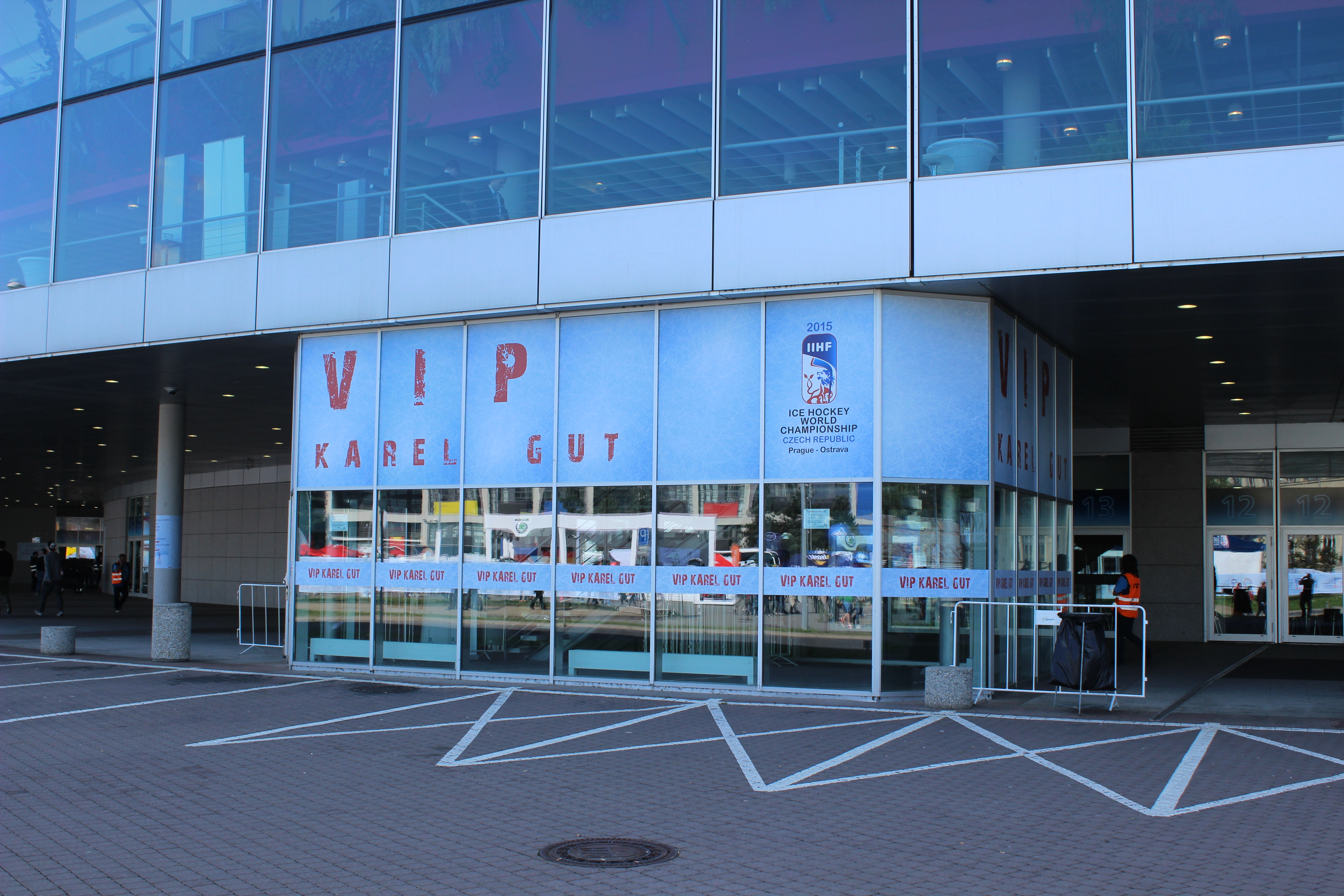
- "Karel Gut" VIP area in Prague's O2 Arena at the 2015 IIHF World Championship.
- Born: 16 September 1927 Prague, Czechoslovakia
- Died: 6 January 2014 (aged 86) Prague, Czech Republic
- Position: Defence
- Shot: Left
- Played for: Czechoslovak Extraliga
- National team: Czechoslovakia
- Playing career: 1951–1964
Medal record
Representing Czechoslovakia
Ice hockey
World Championships
Bronze medal – third place	1955
Bronze medal – third place	1957
Bronze medal – third place	1959
Gold medal – first place	1976 Poland
Gold medal – first place	1977 Austria
World Cup 6 appearances
Winter Olympics 3 appearances

Karel Gut (16 September 1927 – 6 January 2014) was a Czech ice hockey player and coach, who later worked in sports management. He was born in Prague and later played in the Czechoslovak Extraliga. While Gut played soccer in his youth, he was better known as an, "offensive-minded hockey defenseman". Gut was inducted into the International Ice Hockey Federation Hall of Fame in 1998, and has also been inducted into the Czechoslovak Ice Hockey Hall of Fame.

== Playing career ==
Born in Prague, Czechoslovakia, Gut eventually began playing in the Czechoslovak Extraliga with HC ATK Praha. He later played for Tatra Smíchov from 1951 to 1953. He would play the rest of his career with Spartak Praha Sokolova. Gut also captained the Czechoslovakia men's national ice hockey team from 1952 to 1960.

As a player, he won three bronze medals at the Ice Hockey World Championships, first in 1955 where he was voted the tournament's best defenceman, then again in 1957 and in 1959. Gut also made three appearances at the Winter Olympics, and six World Cup appearances.

== Coaching career ==
In 1964 he retired from his playing career in ice hockey and became an ice hockey coach.

Between 1973 and 1979 Gut was the coach for the then Czechoslovakia men's national ice hockey team who he led on to win the gold at the Ice Hockey World Championships in 1976 in Poland and 1977 in Austria.

In the late 1970s, after having observed Roger Neilson of the Toronto Maple Leafs using ringette rings and concepts during a practice in Canada, Gut went back to Czechoslovakia and introduced and modified these ideas and applied them to the training system for the national men's team's practices, which was then also applied as a training aid for Czechoslovakia's university ice hockey teams.

== Management career ==
When Czechoslovakia was divided, Gut became chairman of the Czech Ice Hockey Association. The team went on to take the gold medal at the 1998 Winter Olympics in Japan and won four VM-Gold in 1996, 1999, 2000 and 2001.

== Later life and honors ==
Gut was inducted into the International Ice Hockey Federation Hall of Fame in 1998, and has also been inducted into the Czechoslovak Ice Hockey Hall of Fame. He died on January 6, 2014, at age 86.
