= Dieter Kalt Sr. =

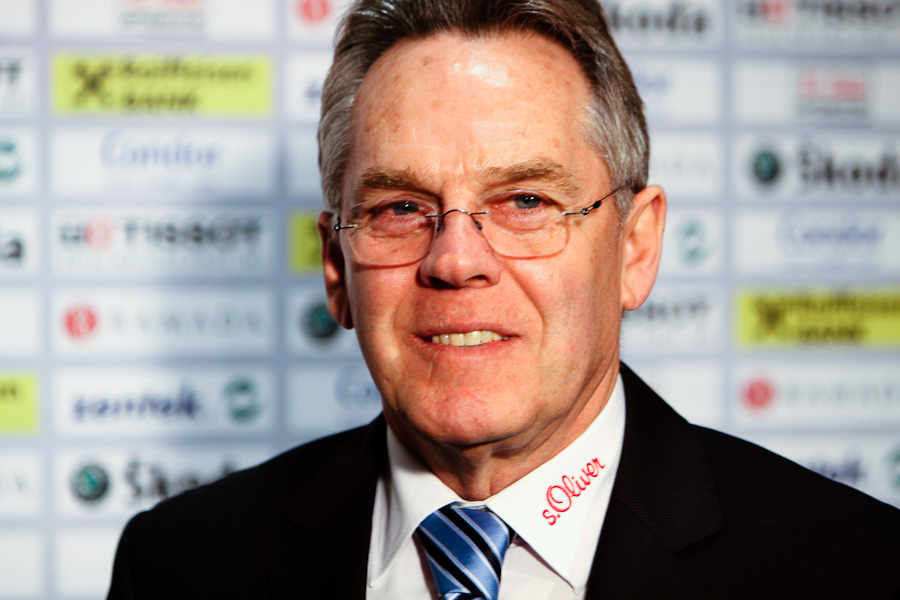
- Born: 29 July 1941 (age 84); Klagenfurt, Austria, Nazi Germany
- Known for: President of the Austrian Ice Hockey Association
- Children: Dieter Kalt
- Honors: IIHF Hall of Fame (2017)
Ice hockey career
- National team: Austria
- Playing career: 1961–1972

Dieter Kalt Sr. (born 29 July 1941) is an Austrian former ice hockey player and hockey executive.

After representing Austria at the Ice Hockey World Championships and Winter Olympic Games, Kalt joined the Austrian Ice Hockey Association and served as president from 1996 to 2016. He was inducted into the IIHF Hall of Fame in 2017 as a builder.

== Career ==
Kalt began his ice hockey career as a player in the Austrian league. As a player, Kalt competed in a total of eight Ice Hockey World Championships and two Winter Olympics with Austria's national team. He also played for EC KAC and ATSE Graz while completing his law degree. After retiring, Kalt spent time as a referee and coach before joining the Austrian Ice Hockey Association in 1976. He was eventually elected to the Austrian Ice Hockey Association Board where he helped guide Austria to five Olympic Games. From 1982 to 2006, Kalt served as district captain of the Sankt Veit an der Glan District.

In 1996, following the retirement of Hans Dobida, Kalt was elected president of the association. As president, he also served on the various International Ice Hockey Federation (IIHF) committees and on the Austrian Olympic Committee as Secretary, Legal Adviser, and Treasurer. In 2002, Kalt was re-elected to a four-year term as president of the Austrian Ice Hockey Federation. In his third year after being re-elected, Kalt helped bring the IIHF World Championship to Austria. He played an integral role in the development and preparations for the 2005 IIHF World Championship in which Austria was hosting. In his capacity as president of the Austrian Ice Hockey Federation, he simultaneously served as president of the organizing committee and as a legal adviser.

As president of the Austrian Ice Hockey Federation in 2010, Kalt was awarded the Golden Medal of the state capital by Austrian mayor Christian Scheider for his services to the sport of hockey in Austria.

Kalt served as president for the Austrian Ice Hockey Association for 20 years before retiring in 2016. He was awarded the Carinthian Provincial Order in silver for his service to Austrian hockey upon his retirement. In 2017, Kalt was elected as an honorary member of the Austrian Olympic Committee and inducted into the IIHF Hall of Fame as a builder. He became the fourth Austrian to be inducted into the IIHF Hall of Fame.

== Personal life ==
His son, Dieter Kalt, is also a former professional ice hockey player. He competed in the Olympic Games and World Championship for Austria as well.

In 2010, Kalt was hospitalized due to a heart attack and was forced to miss attending the 2010 Winter Olympics.
