= Vladimír Bouzek =

Czech ice hockey player

- Born: 3 December 1920 Třebíč, Czechoslovakia
- Died: 31 July 2006 (aged 85)
- Position: Centre
- Shot: Left
- Played for: SK Horácká Slavia Třebíč; SK Zbrojovka Židenice; HC Vítkovice; SK Královo Pole
- National team: Czechoslovakia
- Playing career: 1936–1955
Association football career
- Position: Forward
Senior career*
Years	Team	Apps	(Gls)
1943–1948	Slezská Ostrava		
1950–1952	Vítkovice Železárny		
1953	Slávia Bratislava		
International career
1950–1951	Czechoslovakia	3	(0)
1950	Czechoslovakia B	2	(1)
- * Club domestic league appearances and goals

Vladimír Bouzek (3 December 1920 – 31 July 2006) was an ice hockey player who played in the Czechoslovak First Ice Hockey League. He won a silver medal at the 1948 Winter Olympics. He was inducted into the IIHF Hall of Fame in 2007.

Bouzek also played football as a forward, and made three appearances for the Czechoslovakia national team between 1950 and 1951. He made 151 appearances and scored 80 goals in the Czechoslovak First League, mainly for clubs based in Ostrava.
