= Jaroslav Pitner =

Czech ice hockey coach

- Born: 26 February 1926; Czechoslovakia
- Died: 2009
- Other name: "General of Ice Hockey"
- Occupation: Ice hockey coach
- Known for: Coaching the Czechoslovakia men's national ice hockey team

Jaroslav Pitner (26 February 1926 – 2009) was a Czech ice hockey coach. He was nicknamed "General of Ice Hockey".

Pitner led the Czechoslovak national team to key victories over the Soviet team in 1969, a year after the Soviet Union led Warsaw Pact invasion of Czechoslovakia. Under his leadership, the team also won the world title in 1972, as well as a silver medal at the 1968 Winter Olympics and a bronze at the 1972 games.
