= Czechoslovakia men's national ice hockey team =

Former men's national ice hockey team representing Czechoslovakia

Czechoslovakia
- Association: Czechoslovak Ice Hockey Association
- Most games: Jiří Holík (319)
- Top scorer: Josef Maleček (216)
- Most points: Josef Maleček (285)
- Home stadium: Štvanice Winter Stadium, Prague 1933–1969 (demolished in 2011); Nikolajka Winter Stadium, Prague 1969–1970 (closed in 2022); Sports halls of ČSTV in PKOJF, Prague 1970–1992 (now Fortuna Sports Hall)
- IIHF code: TCH
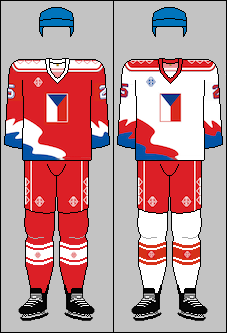

First international
- Canada 15–0 Czechoslovakia (Antwerp, Belgium; 24 April 1920); Last international Czechoslovakia 7–2 Switzerland (Moscow, Russia; 19 December 1992)

Biggest win
- Czechoslovakia 24–0 Yugoslavia (Basel, Switzerland; 3 February 1939); Czechoslovakia 24–0 Belgium (Prague, Czechoslovakia; 21 February 1947); Czechoslovakia 27–3 East Germany (East Berlin, East Germany; 25 April 1951); Czechoslovakia 25–1 Japan (Moscow, the Soviet Union; 4 March 1957)

Biggest defeat
- Canada 30–0 Czechoslovakia (Chamonix, France; 28 January 1924)

Olympics
- Appearances: 16 (first in 1920)
- Medals: Silver: 4 (1948, 1968, 1976, 1984); Bronze: 4 (1920, 1964, 1972, 1992)

IIHF World Championships
- Appearances: 52 (first in 1930)
- Best result: Gold: 6 (1947, 1949, 1972, 1976, 1977, 1985); Silver: 10 (1961, 1965, 1966, 1971, 1974, 1975, 1978, 1979, 1982, 1983); Bronze: 14 (1933, 1938, 1955, 1957, 1959, 1963, 1969, 1970, 1973, 1981, 1987, 1989, 1990, 1992)

Canada Cup
- Appearances: 5 (first in 1976)
- Best result: 2nd: (1976)

Czechoslovakia men's national ice hockey team
Medal record

Men's ice hockey

Olympic Games
Silver medal – second place	1948 St. Moritz	Team
Silver medal – second place	1968 Grenoble	Team
Silver medal – second place	1976 Innsbruck	Team
Silver medal – second place	1984 Sarajevo	Team
Bronze medal – third place	1920 Antwerp	Team
Bronze medal – third place	1964 Innsbruck	Team
Bronze medal – third place	1972 Sapporo	Team
Bronze medal – third place	1992 Albertville	Team

World Championships
Gold medal – first place	1947 Czechoslovakia	
Gold medal – first place	1949 Sweden	
Gold medal – first place	1972 Czechoslovakia	
Gold medal – first place	1976 Poland	
Gold medal – first place	1977 Austria	
Gold medal – first place	1985 Czechoslovakia	
Silver medal – second place	1961 Switzerland	
Silver medal – second place	1965 Finland	
Silver medal – second place	1966 Yugoslavia	
Silver medal – second place	1971 Switzerland	
Silver medal – second place	1974 Finland	
Silver medal – second place	1975 West Germany	
Silver medal – second place	1978 Czechoslovakia	
Silver medal – second place	1979 Soviet Union	
Silver medal – second place	1982 Finland	
Silver medal – second place	1983 West Germany	
Bronze medal – third place	1933 Czechoslovakia	
Bronze medal – third place	1938 Czechoslovakia	
Bronze medal – third place	1955 West Germany	
Bronze medal – third place	1957 Soviet Union	
Bronze medal – third place	1959 Czechoslovakia	
Bronze medal – third place	1963 Sweden	
Bronze medal – third place	1969 Sweden	
Bronze medal – third place	1970 Sweden	
Bronze medal – third place	1973 Soviet Union	
Bronze medal – third place	1981 Sweden	
Bronze medal – third place	1987 Austria	
Bronze medal – third place	1989 Sweden	
Bronze medal – third place	1990 Switzerland	
Bronze medal – third place	1992 Czechoslovakia	

The Czechoslovakia men's national ice hockey team was the national ice hockey team of Czechoslovakia, and competed from 1920 until 1992. The successor to the Bohemia national ice hockey team, which was a European power prior to World War I, the Czechoslovak national team first appeared at the 1920 Summer Olympics, two years after the creation of the state. In the 1940s, they established themselves as the best team in Europe, becoming the first team from the continent to win two World Championships (1947 and 1949). After the arrival of the Soviet Union on the international hockey scene in the 1950s, the Czechoslovaks regularly fought Sweden and Canada for silver and bronze medals, and sometimes beat the Soviets. In total, they won the gold medal six times.

Due to the split of the country Czechoslovakia into the Czech Republic and Slovakia, the team was replaced in 1993 with the Czech and the Slovak national teams. The International Ice Hockey Federation (IIHF) recognized the Czech national team as a successor of Czechoslovakia national team and kept it in the top group, while the Slovak national team was entered into the lowest level, Pool C, winning promotion in successive years to join the elite division in 1996.

== Notable events ==
- First game: 24 April 1920, Antwerp: Canada 15–0 Czechoslovakia
- Last game: 19 December 1992, Moscow: Czechoslovakia 7–2 Switzerland
- Largest victory:
  - 3 February 1939, Basel: Czechoslovakia 24–0 Yugoslavia
  - 21 February 1947, Prague: Czechoslovakia 24–0 Belgium
  - 25 April 1951, East Berlin: Czechoslovakia 27–3 East Germany
  - 4 March 1957, Moscow: Czechoslovakia 25–1 Japan
- Largest defeat: 28 January 1924, Chamonix: Canada 30–0 Czechoslovakia
- Plane crash on 8 November 1948. Six players on the way to an exhibition tour in the UK were killed in the crash of a charter flight from Paris to London.

== Notable players ==
- Mike Buckna
- Ladislav Troják
- Ján Starší
- Jaroslav Drobný
- Vladimír Dzurilla
- Jozef Golonka
- Dominik Hašek
- Ivan Hlinka
- Jiří Holeček
- Jan Hrdina
- František Kaberle Sr.
- Karel Koželuh
- Igor Liba
- Vincent Lukáč
- Josef Maleček
- Vladimír Martinec
- Václav Nedomanský
- Milan Nový
- Dušan Pašek
- Jan Peka
- František Pospíšil
- Jaroslav Pouzar
- Dárius Rusnák
- Vladimír Růžička
- Marián Šťastný
- Peter Šťastný
- Jan Suchý
- František Tikal

=== Former National jerseys ===
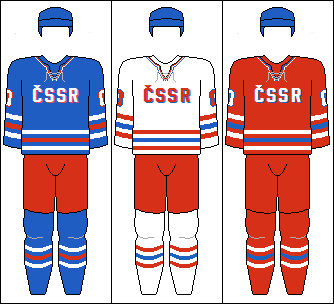
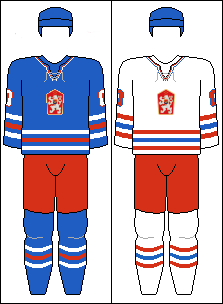
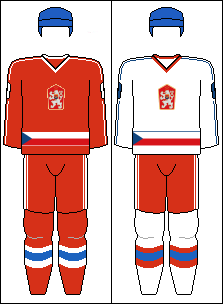
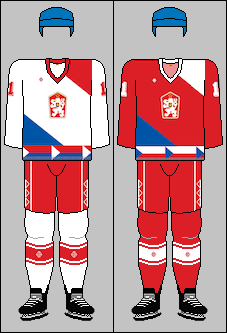
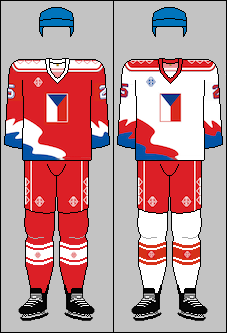

== Olympic record ==
Games	GP	W	OW	T	OL	L	GF	GA	Coach	Captain	Finish	Rank
(Belgium) 1920 Antwerp	3	1	0	0	0	2	1	31	?	Josef Šroubek	Bronze medal Round	3rd place, bronze medalist(s)
(France) 1924 Chamonix	3	1	0	0	0	2	14	41	?	Josef Šroubek	First round	5th
(Switzerland) 1928 St. Moritz	2	1	0	0	0	1	3	5	?	Josef Šroubek	First round	7th
(United States) 1932 Lake Placid	did not participate											
(Nazi Germany) 1936 Garmisch-Partenkirchen	9	5	0	0	0	4	16	18	?	Josef Maleček	Final Round	4th
(Switzerland) 1948 St. Moritz	8	7	0	1	0	0	80	18	Mike Buckna	Vladimír Zábrodský	Round-robin	2nd place, silver medalist(s)
(Norway) 1952 Oslo	8	6	0	0	0	2	47	18	Jiří Tožička, Josef Herman	Karel Gut	Round-robin	4th
(Italy) 1956 Cortina d'Ampezzo	7	3	0	0	0	4	32	36	Vladimír Bouzek	Karel Gut	Final Round	5th
(United States) 1960 Squaw Valley	7	3	0	0	0	4	44	31	Eduard Farda, Ladislav Horský	Karel Gut	Medal Round	4th
(Austria) 1964 Innsbruck	7	5	0	0	0	2	38	19	Jiří Anton, Vladimír Kostka	Vlastimil Bubník	Final Round	3rd place, bronze medalist(s)
(France) 1968 Grenoble	7	5	0	1	0	1	33	17	Jaroslav Pitner, Vladimír Kostka	Jozef Golonka	Final Round	2nd place, silver medalist(s)
(Japan) 1972 Sapporo	5	3	0	0	0	2	26	13	Jaroslav Pitner, Vladimír Kostka	Josef Černý	Final Round	3rd place, bronze medalist(s)
(Austria) 1976 Innsbruck	5	3	0	0	0	2	17	10	Karel Gut, Ján Starší	František Pospíšil	Final Round	2nd place, silver medalist(s)
(United States) 1980 Lake Placid	6	4	0	0	0	2	40	17	Karel Gut, Luděk Bukač, Stanislav Neveselý	Bohuslav Ebermann	Consolation round	5th
(Socialist Federal Republic of Yugoslavia) 1984 Sarajevo	7	6	0	0	0	1	40	9	Luděk Bukač, Stanislav Neveselý	František Černík	Final Round	2nd place, silver medalist(s)
(Canada) 1988 Calgary	8	4	0	0	0	4	33	28	Ján Starší, František Pospíšil	Dušan Pašek	Final Round	6th
(France) 1992 Albertville	8	6	0	0	0	2	36	21	Ivan Hlinka, Jaroslav Walter	Tomáš Jelínek	Bronze Medal Game	3rd place, bronze medalist(s)
(Norway) 1994 Lillehammer	Since 1993, Czechoslovakia has been split and was succeeded by the Czech Republic and Slovakia											

== Canada Cup record ==
Year	GP	W	T	L	GF	GA	Coach	Captain	Finish	Rank
1976	7	3	1	3	23	20	Karel Gut, Ján Starší	František Pospíšil	Final	2nd
1981	6	2	2	2	22	17	Luděk Bukač, Stanislav Neveselý	Milan Nový	Semi-finals	3rd
1984	5	0	1	4	10	21	Luděk Bukač, Stanislav Neveselý	Vladimír Caldr	Round-robin	5th
1987	5	2	1	2	12	15	Ján Starší, František Pospíšil	Dušan Pašek	Semi-finals	4th
1991	5	1	0	4	11	18	Ivan Hlinka, Jaroslav Walter	František Musil	Round-robin	6th

== European Championship record ==
Games	GP	W	T	L	GF	GA	Coach	Captain	Finish	Rank
1910–1914	did not participate. Was Bohemia.									
(Sweden) 1921 Stockholm	1	0	0	1	4	6	?	?	Final	2nd place, silver medalist(s)
(Switzerland) 1922 St. Moritz	2	2	0	0	11	3	?	?	Round-robin	1st place, gold medalist(s)
(Belgium) 1923 Antwerp	4	2	0	2	16	9	?	?	Round-robin	3rd place, bronze medalist(s)
(Italy) 1924 Milan	did not participate.									
(Czechoslovakia) 1925 Štrbské Pleso, Starý Smokovec	3	3	0	0	10	0	?	?	Round-robin	1st place, gold medalist(s)
(Switzerland) 1926 Davos	7	5	0	2	18	8	?	?	Final round	2nd place, silver medalist(s)
(Austria) 1927 Wien	5	1	1	3	7	6	?	?	Round-robin	5th
(Hungary) 1929 Budapest	4	4	0	0	8	3	?	?	Final	1st place, gold medalist(s)
(Germany) 1932 Berlin	6	1	1	4	10	10	?	?	Final round	5th

== World Championship record ==
Championship	GP	W	OW	T	OL	L	GF	GA	Coach	Captain	Finish	Rank
(France) / (Austria) / (Germany) 1930 Chamonix/Vienna/Berlin	1	0	–	0	–	1	1	3	?	?	Quarter-finals	8th
(Poland) 1931 Krynica-Zdrój	7	3	–	1	–	3	10	7	?	?	Quarter-finals	5th
(Czechoslovakia) 1933 Prague	8	6	–	0	–	2	17	12	?	Josef Maleček	3rd place Game	3rd place, bronze medalist(s)
(Italy) 1934 Milan	5	2	–	0	1	2	6	4	?	?	Third round	5th
(Switzerland) 1935 Davos	9	5	–	0	–	4	38	15	?	?	Final Round	4th
(United Kingdom) 1937 London	8	4	–	2	–	2	22	9	?	Josef Maleček	Consolation round	6th
(Czechoslovakia) 1938 Prague	7	4	–	1	–	2	9	6	Mike Buckna	Josef Maleček	3rd place Game	3rd place, bronze medalist(s)
(Switzerland) 1939 Zürich/Basel	10	3	–	2	–	5	37	9	Mike Buckna	Josef Maleček	3rd place Game	4th
1940	Protectorate of Bohemia and Moravia was absorbed into the reformed Czechoslovakia											
(Czechoslovakia) 1947 Prague	7	6	–	0	–	1	85	10	Mike Buckna	František Pácalt	Round-robin	1st place, gold medalist(s)
(Sweden) 1949 Stockholm	7	5	–	0	–	2	42	12	Antonín Vodička	Vladimír Zábrodský	Final Round	1st place, gold medalist(s)
(United Kingdom) 1950 London	did not participate											
(France) 1951 Paris	did not participate											
(Switzerland) 1953 Zürich/Basel	(4)	(3)	–	(0)	–	(1)	(32)	(15)	Eduard Farda	Karel Gut	did not finish/Disqualified	
(Sweden) 1954 Stockholm	7	4	–	0	–	3	41	21	Vladimír Bouzek, Jiří Anton	Karel Gut	Round-robin	4th
(West Germany) 1955 Krefeld/Dortmund/Cologne	8	5	–	1	–	2	63	22	Vladimír Bouzek, Jiří Anton	Karel Gut	Round-robin	3rd place, bronze medalist(s)
(Soviet Union) 1957 Moscow	7	5	–	1	–	1	66	9	Vladimír Bouzek, Bohumil Rejda	Karel Gut	Round-robin	3rd place, bronze medalist(s)
(Norway) 1958 Oslo	7	3	–	2	–	2	21	21	Bohumil Rejda	Karel Gut	Round-robin	4th
(Czechoslovakia) 1959 Prague/Bratislava/Brno/Ostrava	8	5	–	0	–	3	46	22	Vlastimil Sýkora	Karel Gut	Final Round	3rd place, bronze medalist(s)
(Switzerland) 1961 Geneva/Lausanne	7	6	–	1	–	0	33	9	Zdeněk Andršt, Vladimír Kostka	Vlastimil Bubník	Final Round	2nd place, silver medalist(s)
(United States) 1962 Colorado Springs, Denver	did not participate											
(Sweden) 1963 Stockholm	7	5	–	1	–	1	41	16	Jiří Anton	Vlastimil Bubník	Final Round	3rd place, bronze medalist(s)
(Finland) 1965 Tampere	7	6	–	0	–	1	43	10	Vladimír Bouzek, Vladimír Kostka	František Tikal	Final Round	2nd place, silver medalist(s)
(Socialist Federal Republic of Yugoslavia) 1966 Ljubljana	7	6	–	0	–	1	32	15	Vladimír Bouzek, Vladimír Kostka	František Tikal	Final Round	2nd place, silver medalist(s)
(Austria) 1967 Vienna	7	3	–	2	–	2	29	18	Vladimír Bouzek, Jaroslav Pitner	František Tikal	Final Round	4th
(Sweden) 1969 Stockholm	10	8	–	0	–	2	40	20	Jaroslav Pitner, Vladimír Kostka	Jozef Golonka	Final Round	3rd place, bronze medalist(s)
(Sweden) 1970 Stockholm	10	5	–	1	–	4	47	30	Jaroslav Pitner, Vladimír Kostka	Josef Černý	Final Round	3rd place, bronze medalist(s)
(Switzerland) 1971 Bern/Geneva	10	7	–	1	–	2	44	20	Jaroslav Pitner, Vladimír Kostka	Josef Černý	Final Round	2nd place, silver medalist(s)
(Czechoslovakia) 1972 Prague	10	9	–	0	–	1	72	16	Jaroslav Pitner, Vladimír Kostka	František Pospíšil	Final Round	1st place, gold medalist(s)
(Soviet Union) 1973 Moscow	10	6	–	1	–	3	48	20	Jaroslav Pitner, Vladimír Kostka	František Pospíšil	Final Round	3rd place, bronze medalist(s)
(Finland) 1974 Helsinki	10	7	–	0	–	3	57	20	Karel Gut, Ján Starší	František Pospíšil	Final Round	2nd place, silver medalist(s)
(West Germany) 1975 Munich/Düsseldorf	10	8	–	0	–	2	55	19	Karel Gut, Ján Starší	František Pospíšil	Final Round	2nd place, silver medalist(s)
(Poland) 1976 Katowice	10	9	–	1	–	0	67	14	Karel Gut, Ján Starší	František Pospíšil	Final Round	1st place, gold medalist(s)
(Austria) 1977 Vienna	10	7	–	1	–	2	54	32	Karel Gut, Ján Starší	František Pospíšil	Final Round	1st place, gold medalist(s)
(Czechoslovakia) 1978 Prague	10	9	–	0	–	1	54	21	Karel Gut, Ján Starší	Ivan Hlinka	Final Round	2nd place, silver medalist(s)
(Soviet Union) 1979 Moscow	6	3	–	1	–	2	25	30	Karel Gut, Ján Starší	Ivan Hlinka	Final Round	2nd place, silver medalist(s)
(Sweden) 1981 Gothenburg/Stockholm	6	2	–	2	–	2	20	22	Luděk Bukač, Stanislav Neveselý	Milan Nový	Final Round	3rd place, bronze medalist(s)
(Finland) 1982 Helsinki/Tampere	10	5	–	2	–	3	38	20	Luděk Bukač, Stanislav Neveselý	Milan Nový	Final Round	2nd place, silver medalist(s)
(West Germany) 1983 Düsseldorf/Dortmund/Munich	10	6	–	2	–	2	40	21	Luděk Bukač, Stanislav Neveselý	František Černík	Final Round	2nd place, silver medalist(s)
(Czechoslovakia) 1985 Prague	10	7	–	1	–	2	48	22	Luděk Bukač, Stanislav Neveselý	Dárius Rusnák	Final Round	1st place, gold medalist(s)
(Soviet Union) 1986 Moscow	10	5	–	1	–	4	38	21	Ján Starší, František Pospíšil	Dárius Rusnák	Consolation round	5th
1987 Austria	10	6	–	2	–	2	32	22	Ján Starší, František Pospíšil	Dušan Pašek	Final Round	3rd place, bronze medalist(s)
(Sweden) 1989 Stockholm/Södertälje	10	4	–	2	–	4	38	21	Pavel Wohl, Stanislav Neveselý	Vladimír Růžička	Final Round	3rd place, bronze medalist(s)
(Switzerland) 1990 Bern/Fribourg	10	5	–	1	–	4	40	30	Pavel Wohl, Stanislav Neveselý	Jiří Doležal	Final Round	3rd place, bronze medalist(s)
(Finland) 1991 Helsinki/Turku/Tampere	10	4	–	0	–	6	28	27	Stanislav Neveselý, Josef Horešovský	Bedřich Ščerban	Consolation round	6th
(Czechoslovakia) 1992 Prague/Bratislava	8	6	–	0	1	1	33	12	Ivan Hlinka, Jaroslav Walter	Tomáš Jelínek	3rd place Game	3rd place, bronze medalist(s)
(Germany) 1993 Munich/Dortmund	Since 1993 Czechoslovakia has been split and was succeeded by Czech Republic and Slovakia.											

== See also ==
- Czech Republic men's national ice hockey team
- Slovakia men's national ice hockey team
- Protectorate of Bohemia and Moravia men's national ice hockey team
- Bohemia national ice hockey team
- List of accidents involving sports teams
