= Austrian Ice Hockey Association =

Ice hockey governing body in Austria

Austria
- Association name: Österreichischer Eishockeyverband
- IIHF Code: AUT
- IIHF membership: 18 March 1912
- President: Gernot Mittendorfe
- IIHF men's ranking: 14
- IIHF women's ranking: 16

The Austrian Ice Hockey Association (German: Österreichischer Eishockeyverband, ÖEHV) is an association of Austrian sports clubs with ice hockey activities.

The highest-level hockey league in Austria is the Austrian Hockey League which is also called Erste Bank Eishockey Liga.

== Notable people ==
Presidents

- Walter Wasservogel, 1962 to 1977.
- Hans Dobida, 1977 to 1996.
- Dieter Kalt Sr., 1996 to 2016.

Secretary general

- Rita Hrbacek, 1989 to 2004.

== National teams ==
- Austria men's national ice hockey team
- Austria men's national junior ice hockey team
- Austria men's national under-18 ice hockey team
- Austria women's national ice hockey team
- Austria women's national under-18 ice hockey team
