= Walter Bush =

American ice hockey administrator (1929–2016)

- Hockey Hall of Fame, 2000 (Builder)
- Born: September 25, 1929 Minneapolis, Minnesota, U.S.
- Died: September 22, 2016 (aged 86) Naples, Florida, U.S.

Walter Lewis Bush Jr. (September 25, 1929 – September 22, 2016) was an American ice hockey administrator. He was born in Minneapolis, Minnesota. He attended and graduated from Dartmouth College in 1951.

In 1960, he organized and promoted a semi-pro Northwestern League consisting of six teams in Minnesota, Iowa and Nebraska sanctioned under the auspices of the Amateur Hockey Association of the United States (AHAUS). He was also instrumental in bringing National Hockey League hockey to his home state with the Minnesota North Stars as a minority owner. As the president of USA Hockey for nearly two decades, he was responsible for two key achievements: he (alongside Lou Nanne) successfully lobbied for Herb Brooks to coach the Olympic team in the 1980 games (which resulted in a gold medal), and Bush was instrumental in the efforts that brought women's hockey into the Olympic program in 1998. He assumed in June 2003 the position of USA Hockey's chairman of the board, a position he still held in May 2009.

Bush was vice-president of the International Ice Hockey Federation (IIHF) in 1996, when he and Kimmo Leinonen led efforts to establish the IIHF Hall of Fame.

From 1996 to 2001, he was the owner and chairman of the board of the American Hockey League's Kentucky Thoroughblades.

He was inducted into the United States Hockey Hall of Fame in 1980 and later inducted into the Hockey Hall of Fame in 2000. He was awarded the Olympic Order in 2002, and was inducted into the IIHF Hall of Fame in 2009.

He was portrayed in the 2004 Disney film Miracle by Sean McCann. Bush died on September 22, 2016, at the age of 86.

== See also ==
- List of members of the Hockey Hall of Fame
- List of members of the United States Hockey Hall of Fame
- List of members of the IIHF Hall of Fame

Sporting positions
New creation	Minnesota North Stars principal owner 1967–1978	Succeeded by George Gund III; Gordon Gund
