= Left wing lock =

Defensive ice hockey strategy

In this diagram, the red team is executing a left wing lock.

The left wing lock is a defensive ice hockey strategy similar to the neutral zone trap.

In the most basic form, once puck possession changes, the left wing moves back in line with the defencemen. Each defender (including the left winger) plays a zone defence and is responsible for a third of the ice each. Since there are normally only two defencemen, this tactic helps to avoid odd man rushes.

With the reinforced defensive line, the centre and right wing forecheck aggressively. Often the forecheckers will try to drive the puck over to the opponent's right wing.

Under coach Scotty Bowman, the Detroit Red Wings began using "the lock" heavily during the 1994-95 NHL season, earning the Presidents' Trophy for the league's best record during the regular season. The following season Detroit was even more dominant, finishing one point short of the NHL record for most points in a season by a team. However, the system broke down during the playoffs each year, especially as they were frustrated by the neutral zone trap strategy employed by Jacques Lemaire's New Jersey Devils in the 1995 Stanley Cup Finals. It was not until 1997 that Detroit broke through and finally matched their regular-season success with a Stanley Cup championship.

Although "the lock" was made famous by the Red Wings and has been used to great success in their Stanley Cup runs in the past decade, they are not credited with inventing it. The "lock" was invented in Czechoslovakia to work against the dominant Soviet teams of the 1970s. A former assistant coach under Scotty Bowman, Barry Smith, was credited with seeing the left wing lock in Europe and bringing it back to the Red Wings.

The simplicity of "the lock" has made it popular at all levels of hockey and it is not uncommon to see it implemented in youth hockey.
