= Torriani Award =

International ice hockey award

The Torriani Award is given annually by the International Ice Hockey Federation (IIHF) to an ice hockey player with an "outstanding career from non-top hockey nation". It was inaugurated in 2015, and is awarded alongside the annual IIHF Hall of Fame induction ceremony at the Ice Hockey World Championships. It is named for Bibi Torriani, who played internationally for the Switzerland men's national ice hockey team. Recipients of the Torriani Award are inducted into the IIHF Hall of Fame into their own category, separate from other players, referees and builders.

When the award was first announced, IIHF president René Fasel was quoted as saying; "we wanted to create a trophy which honours players for a great international career irrespective of where they played. Nowadays, with NHL players and international players often being the same, we feel that there are so many top players to honour. Still, we wanted to ensure we recognized players who didn’t necessarily win Olympic and World Championship medals but who still had remarkable careers. As a result, we created the Torriani Award, and Lucio Topatigh is a very worthy first recipient".

== Recipients ==
Year	Recipient	Nation	International accomplishments
2015	Lucio Topatigh	Italy	Played for the Italy men's national team from 1990 until 2002, and again at the 2006 Winter Olympics where he was the oldest on the team.
2016	Gábor Ocskay	Hungary	Played 187 games for the Hungary men's national team, helping the team gained promotion to the Ice Hockey World Championships top tier.
2017	Tony Hand	Great Britain	Played for the Great Britain men's national team at 11 Ice Hockey World Championships, was the first British player drafted by a National Hockey League team.
2018	Jesper Damgaard	Denmark	Played 256 games for the Denmark men's national team at 17 Ice Hockey World Championships.
2019	Konstantin Mihailov	Bulgaria	Played for the Bulgaria men's national team at 28 Ice Hockey World Championships, and three IIHF Inline Hockey World Championships with the Bulgaria men's national inline hockey team, then retired from international play at age 51.
2020/2022 (Note: The presentation of the award during the 2020 IIHF World Championship, was delayed until the 2022 IIHF World Championship due to the COVID-19 pandemic. Berteling received the award during the class of 2020/2022 IIHF Hall of Fame induction.)	Ron Berteling	Netherlands	Played for the Netherlands ice hockey at the 1980 Winter Olympics, and served as captain of the Netherlands men's national ice hockey team from 1982 to 1993. He appeared in 14 Ice Hockey World Championships, and holds the record of 213 games played for the national team.
2023	Viktor Szélig	Hungary	Played for the Hungary men's national team at seventeen Ice Hockey World Championships.
2024	Dezső Varga	Romania	Played for the Romania men's national team from 1959 to 1977, and served as the captain from 1969 onward, the only Romanian to play in three Winter Olympic Games tournaments, and participated in 17 Ice Hockey World Championships.
2025	Leszek Laszkiewicz	Poland	Played for the Poland men's national team at 18 Ice Hockey World Championships, including the top tier during the 2002 IIHF World Championship.
2026	Zuzana Tomčíková	Slovakia	Played for Slovakia women's national team at nine Women's World Championships and the 2010 Winter Olympics

== See also ==
- Paul Loicq Award
