= Centre (ice hockey) =

Ice hockey position

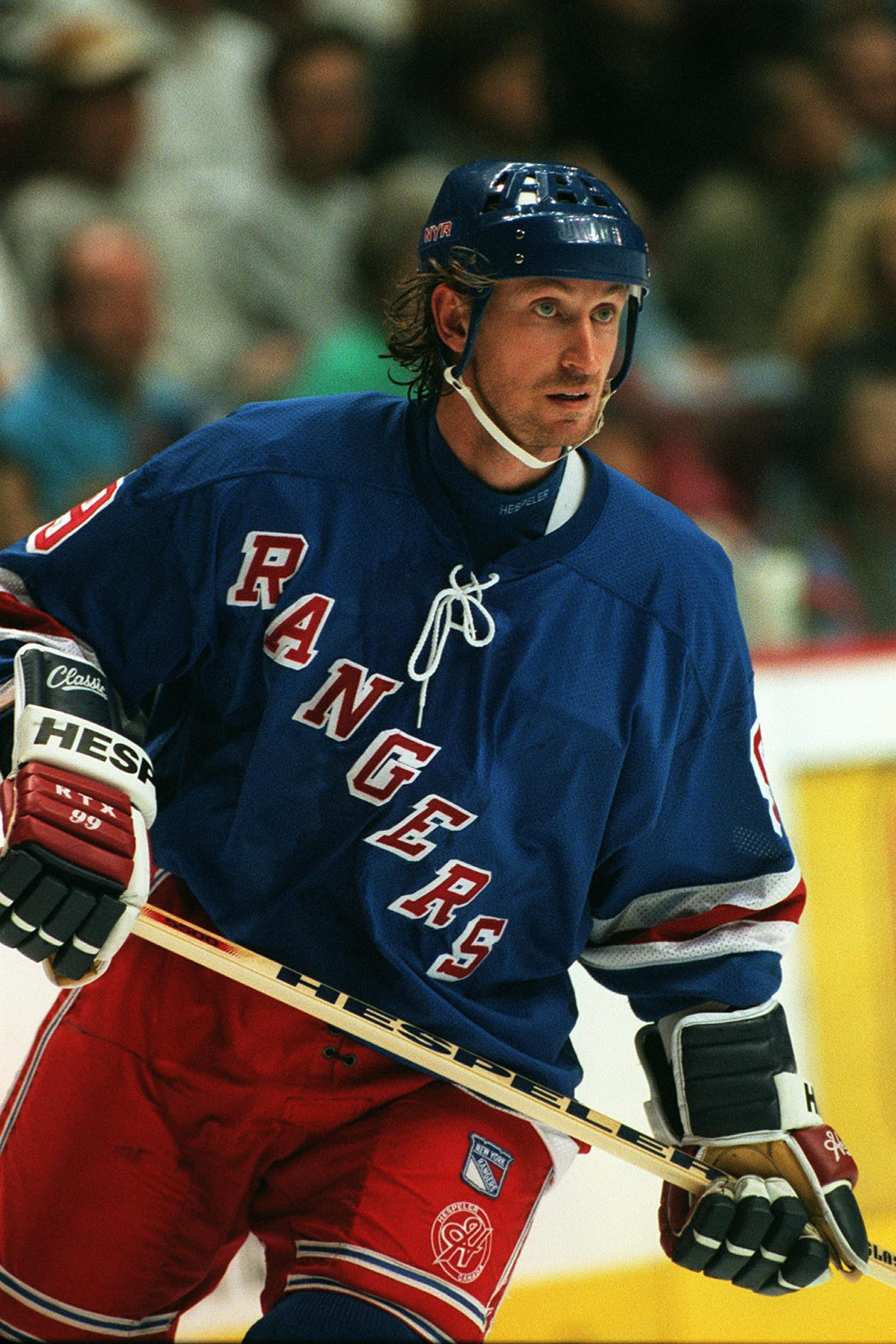
Wayne Gretzky played his entire NHL career as a centre.

The centre (or center in American English) in ice hockey is a forward position of a player whose primary zone of play is the middle of the ice, away from the sideboards. Centres have more flexibility in their positioning and therefore often end up covering more ice surface than any other player. Centres are ideally strong, fast skaters who are able to backcheck quickly from deep in the opposing zone. Generally, centres are expected to be gifted passers more so than goal scorers, although there are exceptions - typically larger centres who position themselves directly in front of the net in order to score off rebounds. They are also expected to have exceptional "ice vision", hockey IQ, intelligence, and creativity. They also generally are the most defensively-oriented forwards on the ice, as they are expected to play the role of the third player in defense, after the defencemen. Centres usually play as part of a line of players that are substituted frequently to keep fresh and keep the game moving.

== Offensive zone play ==
Centres are required to cover a good portion of the ice in all three zones. Where the centre tends to play in the offensive zone is usually a matter of coaching and personal preference. Centres are responsible for keeping the flow of the game moving, and generally handle, and pass the puck more than any other position player. Because of this, most good centres tend to score significantly more assists than goals because the play goes through them as they try to find open teammates. His or her responsibilities in the zone are analogous to the classic number 10 playmaker in soccer.

Because the range of offensive styles teams like to use, exactly how centres are used in the offensive zone is as varied as the players themselves. Generally the centre's role on offence is to move the offence through himself, setting up other players, and providing support for puck battles. They roam around most areas of the ice in the zone and have a lot of freedom in decision making. They are also expected to constantly be in motion causing defenders to have a hard time tracking them.

=== Zone entry ===
The matter of bringing the puck in the zone generally is accomplished in two ways. The first involves the team's best puck carrier (usually the centre) using their speed and quickness to cross the blue line with the puck and set up the offence. The second is colloquially called a "dump in", in which an attacking player (almost always a defenceman or centre) shoots the puck from the neutral zone into either corner behind the opposing net in hopes that the onrushing wingers can beat the opposing defenders to it and gain control. The centre's role here is to provide support for the wingers if they become engaged in a puck battle, and give the battling winger an option to try to move the puck to, or to try to scoop up loose pucks as they become available. Once the puck is freed the offence can then set up as normal.

=== Behind the net ===
When a centre's winger is being attacked along the boards, the centre can take position behind the net to receive the pressured winger's pass. Behind the net is a natural place for some centres to play. It is a very difficult position to defend because it forces the opposing defensemen to leave the front of the net. It also gives the centre a clear view of the ice and most importantly the slot area. From here the centre has clear passing lanes and minimizes the distance and difficulty of passes to nearly any part of the slot.

=== In the slot ===
Many centres use their mobility and freedom to take advantage of the slot area, the area in between the faceoff dots, about 5 to 15 feet from the goal. The slot area is notorious goal-scoring territory because of its proximity to the net and the difficulty the opposing team has in defending it. Many centres like this area because of its openness. Possessing the puck here gives the centre many different options, as well as a central position in the offensive play. From here the player can choose to shoot the puck on net, attempt to draw defenders away from the net by skating, or find open players closer to the goal cage.

Additionally, without the puck, the centre can choose to occupy this space looking for deflections of long shots or rebounds. Aside from some larger centres who focus on scoring off rebounds, centres rarely set up directly in front of the net itself because in case of a turnover, it is much harder to get back in position defensively.

=== On the half boards ===
Some centres will play the half boards. This position is especially important to a centre on some powerplay sets. Again it gives the centre a clear view of the ice surface and many different options. From here he may choose to pass back to a defenceman on the point, go down the boards to a winger behind the net, or drive the net itself hoping to draw defenders to him. The disadvantage of this position is that it is easily defended, and the centre generally does not have much time to survey the ice looking for an open teammate.

=== On the powerplay ===
Powerplay sets are also quite varied, so the centre's role can range a lot. The half board position here is made easier to play because the centre has more time to look over the ice surface, and is not pressured by the defenders as much.

== Neutral zone play ==
=== Attacking ===
The centre's role in the Neutral zone on the attacking side if he/she possesses the puck, is to bring the puck into the offensive zone by carrying or dumping the puck in. Although any player may carry the puck into the zone, centres are most often counted on because of their speed, quickness, and ability to stickhandle. If another player possesses the puck attacking into the zone, the centre's job is to provide support if the puck carrier needs to pass to another player across the blue line. Once the zone has been gained the offence may proceed to set up as they see fit.

On dump ins, the centre's role is to provide support to the wingers as they battle for possession in the corners, and hunt for loose pucks.

=== Defending ===
Many different strategies have been devised to defend the neutral zone. Often successfully defending the neutral zone leads to fewer opportunities for the opposing team to have offensive possessions.

Here the centre will mainly focus on skating and shadowing opposing puck carriers to try to force turnovers. They are responsible for the middle of the ice, and try to cut off long passing lanes to attacking players. If the defending team successfully does force a turnover, the centre is most often responsible for turning the direction of play around or receiving the first pass from a winger who has successfully forced a turnover.

==== The neutral zone trap, pentagon trap, 1-2-2 trap, or zero-forecheck ====
When playing the trap, the centre typically spearheads the defence by placing himself/herself in the middle of the ice between the red line and blue line in defensive position. This forces the puck carrier to either side board where the centre and puck side winger close him in, "trapping" him/her between the two defending players and the boards. Here the attacking player has very few options, and generally must retreat to a defenceman, whereupon the defending team can reset the trap. This tactic was pioneered by the New Jersey Devils in the late 1990s and has been used extensively in the NHL and all levels of hockey since.

==== The left wing lock ====
When employing the left wing lock strategy, the centre's role is typically to shadow the puck carrier or provide token pressure in the opposing team's zone to force them to try to pass the puck up ice into the lock. This is a much older strategy and is less commonly employed at elite levels, however it was most recently used extensively by the 2006 Carolina Hurricanes on their way to their first Stanley Cup.

== Defensive zone play ==
Unlike their offensive responsibilities, the centre's defensive responsibilities are relatively straightforward. Again the centre must be able to use their skating ability to cover vast portions of the ice, and is responsible for the greatest percentage of ice in their own zone than of any position.

=== Defending the slot area ===
The centre's first and foremost responsibility is defending the slot area from opposing forwards. This is the most difficult area of the ice to defend because of its proximity to the net and its being situated in the middle of the ice. The centre is not only responsible for the opposing centre, but other forwards who venture into the slot as well. Like defencemen, centres are often relied upon to block long-distance shots while patrolling the slot. Because there are no boards in the slot area, it is difficult to play physically on opposing forwards so centres must be good at using their sticks to defend via poke checks, sweep checks, stick lifts, and other stickwork.

=== Defending the perimeter ===
The perimeter is an advantageous position for the defence, the boards act as an extra defender and the defending team often will try to enclose a puck carrier between the boards and two or more defenders to force turnovers. The centre's general responsibility is to provide support to other players that engage opposing puck carriers in puck battles on the boards by giving the primary defender (normally a defenceman in the defensive zone) an outlet to move the puck to if he/she is able to win the puck from the offensive player, though the centre does on occasion participate in these puck battles if they must.

=== Breaking out of the zone ===
When the puck is turned over by the offensive team, the defence must be able to exit the zone fluidly. In a basic fundamental break-out, the puck is controlled by the defence behind the net who then passes up the boards to a forward. The centre curls at the strong side faceoff dot and begins to break out alongside the puck carrying winger. The winger, if undefended, may skate the puck out himself/herself, in which case the centre provides a passing option in the neutral zone, or if the winger is pressured, can make the break-out pass to the centre moving up the ice. Here the centre can carry the puck out of the zone on their own, or look for the weak side winger coming across centre ice.

A quick break is sometimes used to take advantage of the opponent's sloppy transition game. In this set, the defenceman directly passes to the centre curling at the faceoff dot. The centre can then carry the puck out himself/herself or try to pass to the streaking weakside winger up the ice.

=== On the penalty kill ===
The penalty killing unit normally consists of two forwards and two defencemen. The centre's role does not differ appreciably from any other forward, though they are almost always included on the penalty killing unit for the purpose of taking the faceoff. Depending on what formation the penalty kill uses, the centre along with the other forward on the ice will play high side defence, trying to cut off passing lanes in the slot. Secondarily, they pressure offensive players on the boards if they do not have clear possession.

== Back checking ==
The centre should always be prepared for a quick break-out pass by the opposing team. The centre is expected to play the deepest in the offensive zone but also the first of the forwards to backcheck. On the backcheck, the centre should take the first opposing player not covered (usually "the third man back").

== Faceoffs ==
It is generally the centre's job to handle faceoffs for their team. Centres employ many different tactics to win faceoffs that take advantage their strength or swiftness.

Faceoff techniques and preferences vary widely from player to player depending on that player's skill at taking faceoffs, speed, strength, and agility. Although faceoff techniques differ greatly, it is almost universal now that the centre reverses his lower hand and takes the faceoff on his backhand in order to gain more strength when pulling the puck.

Bigger, heavier, and stronger centres may prefer to use strength tactics such as tying up the opposing centre and winning the puck with his feet or overpowering the opponent by ripping the puck away using sheer strength. Smaller, quicker centres may employ swiftness tactics such as trying to contact the puck before his opponent has a chance to get his stick in the dot, or the slide technique where he allows his opponent access to the dot easily so he can slide his stick underneath and pull the puck back out.

Faceoffs are critical to a team's success on offence or defence. To this end, centres that may be deficient in other areas, especially offensively, can still have value to a team if they are excellent faceoff takers. Faceoffs are often used as a measure of defensive effectiveness, and good faceoff takers play many minutes on the penalty kill and in late game lead situations where quickly gaining possession of the puck is of vital importance.
