= IIHF Hall of Fame =

International ice hockey hall of fame

- Established: 1997
- Location: Hockey Hall of Fame; 30 Yonge Street; Toronto, Ontario, Canada
- Coordinates: 43°38′49″N 79°22′38″W
- Inductees: 177 players 68 builders 7 referees 9 Torriani Awards; 269 total

The IIHF Hall of Fame is a hall of fame operated by the International Ice Hockey Federation (IIHF). It was founded in 1997, and has resided at the Hockey Hall of Fame in Toronto since 1998. Prior to 1997, the IIHF housed exhibits at the International Hockey Hall of Fame in Kingston, Ontario. Inductions are made annually at the medal presentation day of the Ice Hockey World Championships. As of 2026, the IIHF has inducted 269 members.

== Background ==
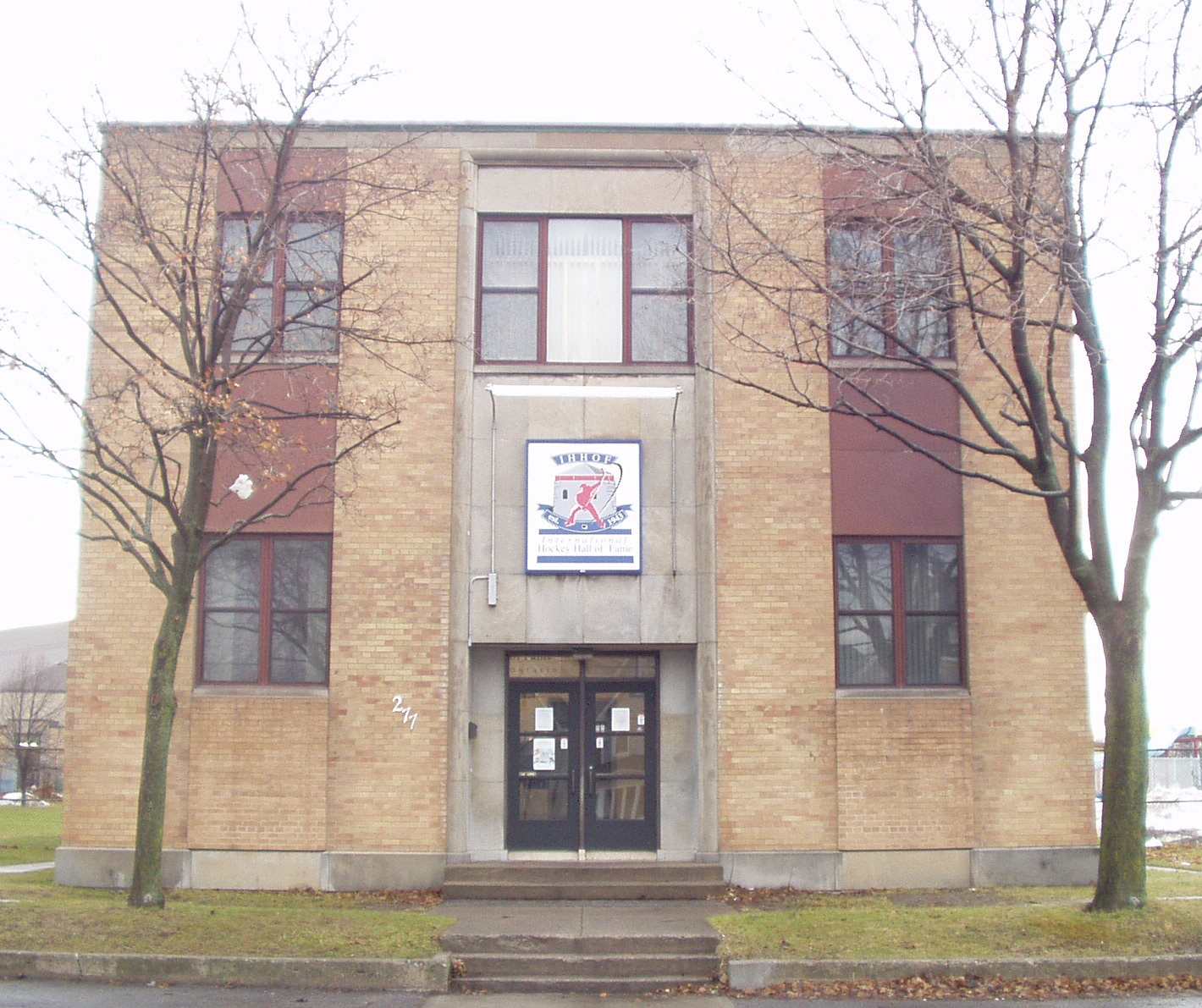
The International Hockey Hall of Fame in Kingston hosted IIHF exhibits from 1992 to 1997.

The International Ice Hockey Federation (IIHF) was founded in 1908, with a membership that consisted of five European nations. The federation has since grown to include 76 national association members as of 2019, and now oversees international events which include ice hockey at the Olympic Games, and the Ice Hockey World Championships.

The IIHF had amassed a collection of artifacts from these events over the years, but only displayed them in temporary exhibits. In 1990, IIHF technical director Roman Neumayer helped negotiate a deal with representatives from Kingston, Ontario, to display IIHF memorabilia at the International Hockey Hall of Fame, and sought to make North American people aware of the history of ice hockey in Europe. He considered Kingston an ideal location since like the city focused on amateur hockey similar to Europe rather than professional hockey.

The IIHF loaned more than 4,000 items to the hall of fame in Kingston, for a five-year period from 1992 to 1997, while a more permanent display was being planned. Kingston City Council provided a CA$100,000 line of credit towards building a true international ice hockey museum. The temporary setup for the IIHF exhibits was located adjacent to the Kingston Memorial Centre, but that partnership ended in 1997, when the IIHF withdrew. The IIHF cited the lack of progress made towards getting a new facility constructed in downtown Kingston, as the primary reason for terminating the agreement.

== History ==
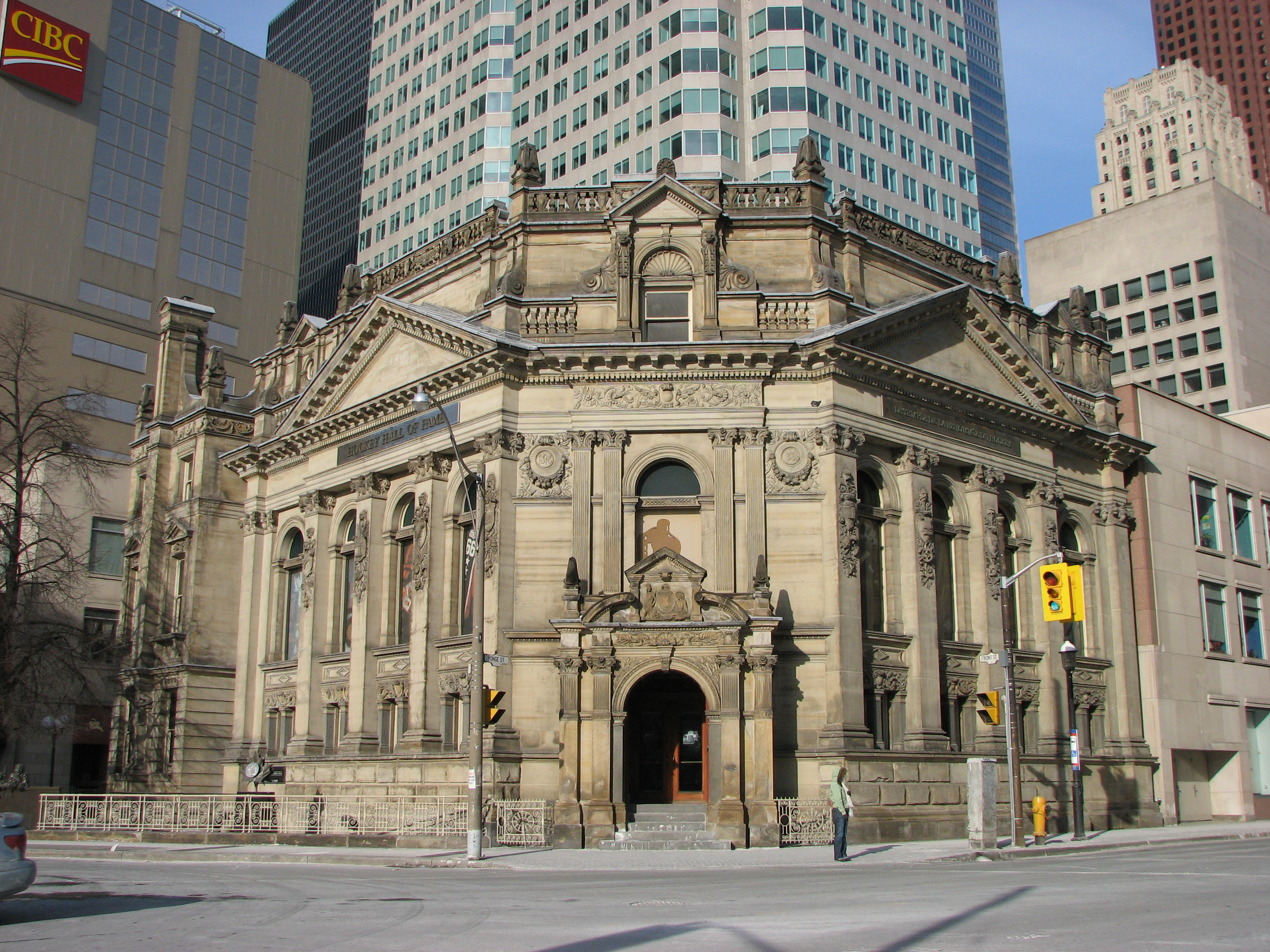
The Hockey Hall of Fame in Toronto has hosted the IIHF Hall of Fame since 1998.

The first step taken by the IIHF to create its own hall of fame was a proposal made in 1996, which was later ratified at the 1997 IIHF summer congress to host the museum in Zürich. The approval came exactly 89 years from the foundation of the IIHF, with the purpose of honoring former international ice hockey players, builders (administrators) and officials. Efforts to establish the hall of fame were led by vice-president, Walter Bush; and the director of public relations and marketing, Kimmo Leinonen.

The IIHF has sought to honor the people who have made the greatest contributions to developing hockey in their respective nations, and internationally, with the annual induction ceremony taking place on the medal presentation day of the Ice Hockey World Championships. The hall of fame recognized its first members at a ceremony in Helsinki, during the 1997 Men's World Ice Hockey Championships. The longest-serving president of the IIHF at the time, Paul Loicq, and 30 others were members of the inaugural class of inductees. The IIHF later agreed with the National Hockey League to transfer its exhibits to the Hockey Hall of Fame in Toronto, as of 29 July 1998.

The IIHF has also created two other awards to honor international hockey persons. The Paul Loicq Award has been awarded annually since 1998 for contributions to the development of hockey. In 2015, the IIHF created the Torriani Award for "players with an outstanding career from non-top hockey nations". The award was named for Bibi Torriani, who played internationally for the Switzerland men's national ice hockey team. The two awards are handed out at the same time as the hall of fame induction. The IIHF includes the recipients of the Torriani Award in the list of Hall of Fame inductees, but the Paul Loicq Award recipients are listed separately. In 2024, the IIHF introduced an annual media award presented to an ice hockey journalist.

== Exhibits ==
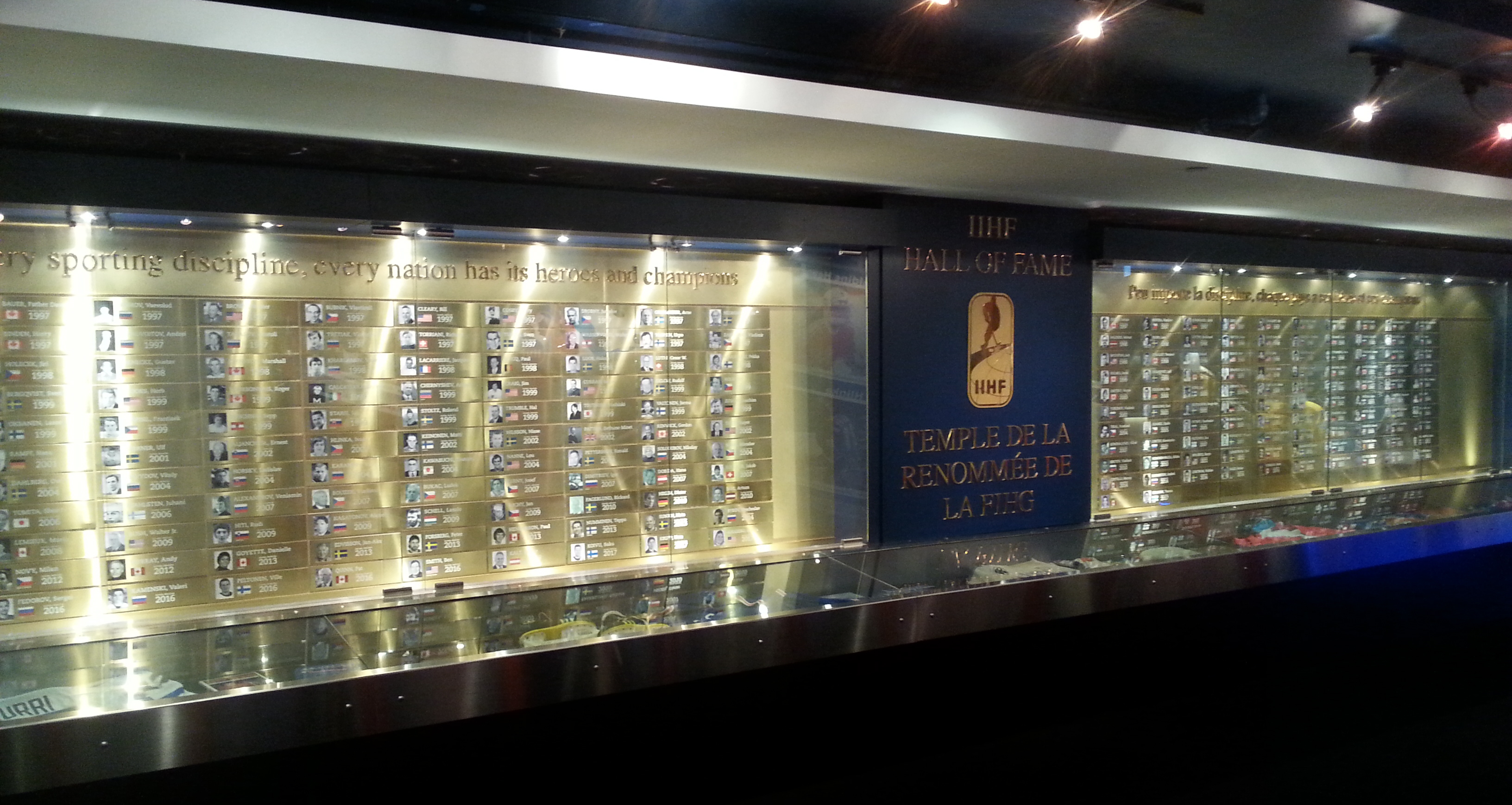
IIHF Hall of Fame honor roll

The IIHF Hall of Fame and its exhibits reside in the "World of Hockey Zone", and are sponsored by Tissot. At approximately 6,000 square feet (560 m^{2}), it is the largest section of the Hockey Hall of Fame. The zone includes the IIHF Hockey Hall of Fame honor roll, listing each inductee by country and year of enshrinement. Each national association member of the IIHF is represented in the collection of artifacts in the display, which includes many national team hockey jerseys. The World of Hockey also recognizes members of the Triple Gold Club, and displays memorabilia from the "Miracle on Ice" at the 1980 Winter Olympic Games. Other notable events included are the 1972 Summit Series, the men's and women's Ice Hockey World Championships, national-level hockey leagues in Europe, the Spengler Cup, the World Cup of Hockey, and the Canada Cup.

The exhibits also display trophies from IIHF-sanctioned events. Included are Olympic gold medals from men's ice hockey, and women's ice hockey, the men's world championship, the women's world championship, the IIHF World U20 Championship (World Juniors), and the Spengler Cup.

== Inductees ==
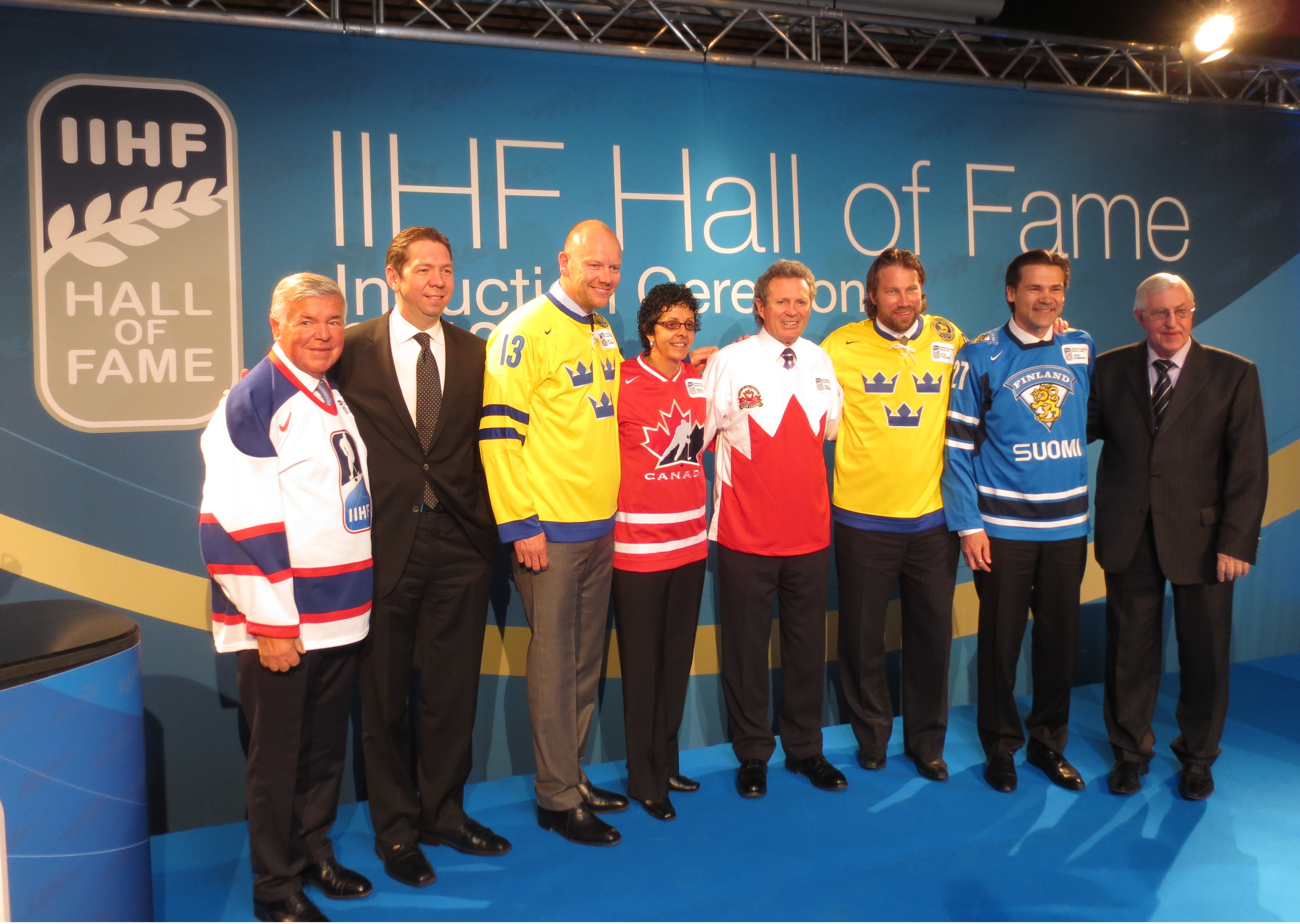
2013 IIHF Hall of Fame inductees: (left to right) Jan-Åke Edvinsson, Gord Miller, Mats Sundin, Danielle Goyette, Paul Henderson, Peter Forsberg and Teppo Numminen; 2000 IIHF Hall of Fame inductee, Boris Mikhailov on the far right

Elections to the IIHF Hall of Fame are based on the proposed candidates from national associations, members of the IIHF council, and members of the elections committee. There are 269 total inductees as of 2026. (Note: 261 IIHF Hall of Fame inductees as of 2025.) (Note: Eight additional inductees in 2026; including six into the player category, one into the builder category, and one into Torriani Award category.)

In 2008, Geraldine Heaney, Angela James, and Cammi Granato became the first three women inducted into the IIHF Hall of Fame.

As of 2020, Bob Nadin is the only recipient of the Paul Loicq Award to also be inducted into the IIHF Hall of Fame.

The 2020 induction ceremony was scheduled during the 2020 IIHF World Championship, but was delayed due to the COVID-19 pandemic. The IIHF Hall of Fame class of 2020/2022 was inducted during the 2022 IIHF World Championship.

In December 2022, Sandra Dombrowski was announced as the first female referee to be inducted into the IIHF Hall of Fame. In 2026, Zuzana Tomčíková became the first female to receive the Torriani Award.

== See also ==
- IIHF Centennial All-Star Team, a team selected in 2008 to represent the best players in international ice hockey
- IIHF All-Time Teams, all-star teams by country selected in 2020
