= 1969 Ice Hockey World Championships =

1969 edition of the World Ice Hockey Championships

Tournament details
- Host countries: Sweden; Yugoslavia
- Dates: 15–30 March
- Teams: 6

Final positions
- Champions: Soviet Union (9th title)
- Runners-up: Sweden
- Third place: Czechoslovakia
- Fourth place: Canada

Tournament statistics
- Games played: 30
- Goals scored: 219 (7.3 per game)
- Attendance: 196,769 (6,559 per game)
- Scoring leader: (Soviet Union) Anatoli Firsov 14 points

The 1969 Ice Hockey World Championships was the 36th edition of the Ice Hockey World Championships, which also doubled as the 47th European ice hockey championships. For the first time the Pool A, B and C tournaments were hosted by different nations:

Pool A in Stockholm, Sweden, 15–30 March 1969
Pool B in Ljubljana, Yugoslavia, 28 February – 9 March 1969
Pool C in Skopje, Yugoslavia, 24 February – 2 March 1969

A total of 20 nations participated in the tournament. The Pool A team featured only the top six nations, now playing a double round-robin tournament for the amateur world championship. Teams #7-#14 contested the Pool B championship with the winner qualifying for the 1970 Pool A championship, while the bottom six participated in the Pool C tournament. Pool B and C began exchanging two teams this year (through promotion and relegation), a practice that lasted until 1987.

== World Championship Group A (Sweden) ==
For the seventh straight year, the Soviet Union won the Pool A tournament. Originally the tournament was scheduled to be held in Czechoslovakia, but due to the Soviet invasion of the country, they declined to host. In the two games the Czechoslovak and Soviet teams played against each other, the Czechoslovak team won both times, becoming the first team to beat the Soviet Union twice in the same international tournament. For the first time in international ice hockey, body-checking was allowed in all three zones of the ice. Team USA was demoted to Pool-B after losing all ten games.

Pos.	Team	URS	SWE	TCH	CAN	FIN	USA	W	T	L	GF–GA	PTS
1.	Soviet Union	***	4:2*	0:2*	7:1*	6:1*	17:2*	8	0	2	59:23	16
2.	Sweden	2:3	***	2:0*	5:1*	6:3*	8:2*	8	0	2	45:19	16
3.	Czechoslovakia	4:3	0:1	***	6:1*	7:4*	8:3*	8	0	2	40:20	16
4.	Canada	2:4	2:4	2:3	***	5:1*	5:0*	4	0	6	26:31	8
5.	Finland	3:7	0:5	2:4	1:6	***	4:3*	2	0	8	26:52	4
6.	United States	4:8	4:10	2:6	0:1	3:7	***	0	0	10	23:74	0

47.	European Championship Rankings (URS-SWE-CSK-FIN games only)
1.	Soviet Union
2.	Sweden
3.	Czechoslovakia
4.	Finland

Czechoslovakia – Canada 6:1 (1:0, 2:1, 3:0)

15. March 1969 – Stockholm
Goalscorers: Suchý 2, Nedomanský, Jiří Holík, Ševčík, Horešovský – King.
Referees: Wiking, Dahlberg (SWE)

Sweden – Finland 6:3 (3:1, 1:1, 2:1)

15. March 1969 – Stockholm
Goalscorers: Lundström 2, Henriksson 2, Sterner, Nilsson - J. Peltonen, Keinonen, Isaksson.

Soviet Union – United States 17:2 (3:0, 11:0, 3:2)

15. March 1969 – Stockholm
Goalscorers: Starshinov 4, Firsov 4, Mikhailov 3, Yurzinov 2, Paladiev, Maltsev, Petrov, Mishakov - Lackey 2.

Canada – Finland 5:1 (1:1, 1:0, 3:0)

16. March 1969 – Stockholm
Goalscorers: Caffery 2, Pinder, Bourbonnais, Huck - Keinonen.

Sweden – Soviet Union 2:4 (2:1, 0:1, 0:2)

16. March 1969 – Stockholm
Goalscorers: Nilsson, Johansson – Starshinov, Maltsev, Mikhailov, Kharlamov.

Czechoslovakia – United States 8:3 (2:1, 4:2, 2:0)

16. March 1969 – Stockholm
Goalscorers: Nedomanský 2, Jar. Holík 2, Farda, Suchý, Hrbatý, Golonka – Lackey, Christiansen, Stordahl.
Referees: Dahlberg (SWE), Vaillancourt (CAN)

Czechoslovakia – Finland 7:4 (4:1, 3:1, 0:2)

18. March 1969 - Stockholm
Goalscorers: Machač 3, Nedomanský 2, Suchý, Jiří Holík – Rantasila 2, Partinen, Mononen.
Referees: Joyal, Villancourt (CAN)

Sweden – United States 8:2 (1:2, 3:0, 4:0)

18. March 1969 - Stockholm
Goalscorers: Sterner 2, Carlsson, Milton, Karlsson, Johansson, Lundström, Olsson - Markle, Pleau.

Soviet Union – Canada 7:1 (5:1, 2:0, 0:0)

18. March 1969 - Stockholm
Goalscorers: Vikulov 2, Firsov 2, Kharlamov 2, Yakushev - Pinder.

Soviet Union - Finland 6:1 (3:0, 1:0, 2:1)

19. March 1969 - Stockholm
Goalscorers: Petrov 2, Paladiev, Maltsev, Firsov, Kharlamov - Oksanen.

Czechoslovakia - Sweden 0:2 (0:1, 0:0, 0:1)

19. March 1969 - Stockholm
Goalscorers: Palmqvist, Nilsson.
Referees: Trumble (USA), Joyal (CAN)

Canada – United States 5:0 (1:0, 0:0, 4:0)

20. March 1969 - Stockholm
Goalscorers: Hargreaves, Caffery, Bayes, King, Huck.

Sweden – Canada 5:1 (1:1, 3:0, 1:0)

21. March 1969 - Stockholm
Goalscorers: Lundström 2, Svedberg, Sjöberg, Johansson - Caffery.

Czechoslovakia - Soviet Union 2:0 (0:0, 1:0, 1:0)

21. March 1969 - Stockholm
Goalscorers: 33. Suchý, 47. Černý.
Referees: Dahlberg (SWE), Vaillancourt (CAN)

Finland – United States 4:3 (1:1, 1:0, 2:2)

22. March 1969 – Stockholm
Goalscorers: E. Peltonen 2, Leimu, Wahlsten - Pleau, Mayasich, Sheehy.

United States – Soviet Union 4:8 (1:3, 1:2, 2:3)

23. March 1969 - Stockholm
Goalscorers: Mayasich 2, Skime, Naslund - Mishakov 2, Paladiev, Firsov, Mikhailov, Petrov, Kharlamov, Yurzinov.

Sweden – Finland 5:0 (2:0, 2:0, 1:0)

23. March 1969 – Stockholm
Goalscorers: Karlsson 3, Sjöberg, Johansson.

Czechoslovakia - Canada 3:2 (1:1, 1:0, 1:1)

23. March 1969 - Stockholm
Goalscorers: Golonka, Hrbatý, Jar. Holík – Heindl, Bayes.
Referees: Dahlberg (SWE), Trumble (USA)

Sweden – Soviet Union 2:3 (1:1, 1:1, 0:1)

24. March 1969 – Stockholm
Goalscorers: Sjöberg, Nygren - Mikhailov 2, Petrov.

Czechoslovakia - Finland 4:2 (2:2, 1:0, 1:0)

25. March 1969 - Stockholm
Goalscorers: Jiřík 2, Jiří Holík, Nedomanský – Keinonen, Isaksson.
Referees: Wiking (SWE), Trumble (USA)

United States - Canada 0:1 (0:1, 0:0, 0:0)

25. March 1969 - Stockholm
Goalscorer: Mott.

Finland - Soviet Union 3:7 (0:1, 1:4, 2:2)

26. March 1969 - Stockholm
Goalscorers: Leimu, Isaksson, Oksanen – Paladiev, Zimin, Starshinov, Maltsev, Petrov, Firsov, Mishakov

Czechoslovakia - United States 6:2 (2:0, 2:1, 2:1)

26. March 1969 - Stockholm
Goalscorers: Nedomanský 2, Černý 2, Pospíšil, Machač – Pieau, Skime.
Referees: Sillankorva (FIN), Vaillancourt (CAN)

Sweden – Canada 4:2 (1:0, 0:2, 3:0)

27. March 1969 - Stockholm
Goalscorers: Sterner 2, Johansson, Håkan Nygren – Pinder, Heindl.

Czechoslovakia - Soviet Union 4:3 (2:0, 0:2, 2:1)

28. March 1969 - Stockholm
Goalscorers: 15. Jiří Holík, 20. Nedomanský, 49. Horešovský, 51. Jar. Holík – 22. Kharlamov, 33. Firsov, 58. Ragulin.
Referees: Dahlberg (SWE), Vaillancourt (CAN)

Finland – Canada 1:6 (0:3, 1:2, 0:1)

29. March 1969 – Stockholm
Goalscorers: Mononen - King, Stephanson, Heindl, Begg, Mott, Huck.

Sweden – United States 10:4 (6:2, 1:1, 3:1)

29. March 1969 – Stockholm
Goalscorers: Milton 3, Nilsson 3, Karlsson, Johansson, Nygren, Olsson - Lackey, Pleau, Stordahl, Gambucci.

United States – Finland 3:7 (1:1, 0:5, 2:1)

30. March 1969 - Stockholm
Goalscorers: Pleau, Stordahl, Christiansen - Rantasila 2, J. Peltonen 2, Leimu, Harju, E. Peltonen.

Czechoslovakia – Sweden 0:1 (0:1, 0:0, 0:0)

30. March 1969 – Stockholm
Goalscorer: 18. Olsson.
Referees: Trumble (USA), Vaillancourt (CAN)

Canada – Soviet Union 2:4 (1:1, 0:1, 1:2)

30. March 1969 – Stockholm
Goalscorers: Demarco, Heindl - Mikhailov 2, Romishevsky, Maltsev.

== Pool A Statistics and team rosters ==
	LEADING SCORERS	Goals	Assists	Points
1.	(Soviet Union) Anatoli Firsov	10	4	14
2.	(Soviet Union) Boris Mikhailov	9	5	14
2.	(Sweden) Ulf Sterner	9	5	14
4.	(Czechoslovakia) Jaroslav Holík	4	10	14
5.	(Soviet Union) Valeri Kharlamov	6	7	13

1. Soviet Union
Goaltenders: Viktor Zinger, Viktor Puchkov.
Defencemen: Vitali Davydov, Igor Romishevsky, Alexander Ragulin, Vladimir Lutchenko, Yevgeni Paladiev, Viktor Kuzkin.
Forwards: Vladimir Vikulov, Alexander Maltsev, Anatoli Firsov, Boris Mikhailov, Vladimir Petrov, Valeri Kharlamov, Yevgeni Zimin, Viacheslav Starshinov, Alexander Yakushev, Yevgeni Mishakov, Vladimir Yurzinov.
Coaches: Arkady Chernyshev, Anatoli Tarasov.

2. Sweden
Goaltenders: Leif Holmqvist, Gunnar Bäckman.
Defencemen: Lennart Svedberg, Arne Carlsson, Bert-Ola Nordlander, Lars-Erik Sjöberg, Nils Johansson, Kjell-Rune Milton.
Forwards: Stig-Göran Johansson, Stefan Karlsson, Tord Lundström, Ulf Sterner, Lars-Göran Nilsson, Björn Palmqvist, Håkan Nygren, Mats Hysing, Dick Yderström, Roger Olsson, Leif Henriksson.
Coach: Arne Strömberg.

3. Czechoslovakia
Goaltenders: Vladimír Dzurilla, Miroslav Lacký.
Defencemen: Jan Suchý, Josef Horešovský, Oldřich Machač, František Pospíšil, Vladimír Bednář.
Forwards: František Ševčík, Jozef Golonka, Jaroslav Jiřík, Jan Hrbatý, Jaroslav Holík, Jiří Holík, Richard Farda, Václav Nedomanský, Josef Černý, Jan Klapáč, Jan Havel, Josef Augusta.
Coaches: Jaroslav Pitner, Vladimír Kostka.

4. Canada
Goaltenders: Wayne Stephenson, Ken Dryden, Steve Rexe.
Defencemen: Gary Begg, Terry O'Malley, Ken Stephanson, Jack Bownass, Bob Murdoch, Ab DeMarco, Jr.
Forwards: Gerry Pinder, Fran Huck, Morris Mott, Richie Bayes, Terry Caffery, Steve King, Chuck Lefley, Roger Bourbonnais, Ted Hargreaves, Bill Heindl, Danny O'Shea
Coach: Jackie McLeod.

5. Finland
Goaltenders: Urpo Ylönen, Lasse Kiili.
Defencemen: Seppo Lindström, Lalli Partinen, Juha Rantasila, Ilpo Koskela, Pekka Marjamäki.
Forwards: Lasse Oksanen, Juhani Wahlsten, Matti Keinonen, Esa Peltonen, Jorma Peltonen, Pekka Leimu, Lauri Mononen, Esa Isaksson, Juhani Jylhä, Veli-Pekka Ketola, Matti Harju, Kari Johansson.
Coaches: Gustav Bubnik and Seppo Liitsola.

6. United States
Goaltenders: Mike Curran, John Lothrop.
Defencemen: Bruce Riutta, Carl Lackey, Jim Branch, Bob Paradise, John Mayasich.
Forwards: Ron Nasland, Paul Coppo, Larry Pleau, Larry Stordahl, Bill Reichert, Gary Gambucci, Tim Sheehy, Keith Christiansen, Pete Markle, Jerry Lackey, Larry Skime.
Coach: John Mayasich (player-coach).

== World Championship Group B (Yugoslavia) ==
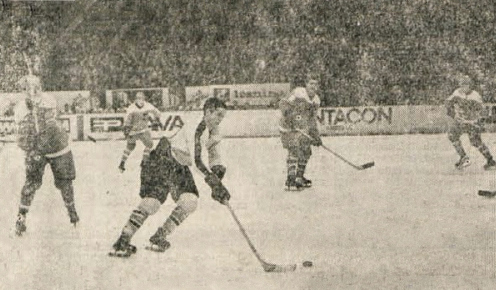
Match between Austria and Yugoslavia. Yugoslavia won 2–1.

		GDR	POL	YUG	GER	NOR	ROM	AUT	ITA	W	T	L	GF–GA	PTS
7.	East Germany	***	4:1	6:1	6:1	13:4	11:2	11:3	11:1	7	0	0	62:13	14
8.	Poland	1:4	***	4:1	3:2	5:1	4:2	9:1	5:2	6	0	1	31:13	12
9.	Yugoslavia	1:6	1:4	***	4:1	3:3	4:4	2:1	2:1	3	2	2	17:20	8
10.	West Germany	1:6	2:3	1:4	***	5:0	6:2	8:0	5:1	4	0	3	28:16	8
11.	Norway	4:13	1:5	3:3	0:5	***	5:4	3:3	10:2	2	2	3	26:35	6
12.	Romania	2:11	2:4	4:4	2:6	4:5	***	5:4	5:2	2	1	4	24:36	5
13.	Austria	3:11	1:9	1:2	0:8	3:3	4:5	***	3:1	1	1	5	15:39	3
14.	Italy	1:11	2:5	1:2	1:5	2:10	2:5	1:3	***	0	0	7	10:41	0

- East Germany was promoted to the 1970 Pool A tournament while Austria and Italy were demoted to Pool C. Later, when Canada withdrew from international play, second place Poland was also promoted to fill their spot.

Poland – Romania 4:2 (0:1, 2:0, 2:1)

28. February 1969 – Ljubljana

East Germany – Italy 11:1 (2:0, 4:1, 5:0)

28. February 1969 – Ljubljana

Norway – Austria 3:3 (2:0, 1:2, 0:1)

28. February 1969 – Ljubljana

Yugoslavia – West Germany 4:1 (1:1, 2:0, 1:0)

28. February 1969 – Ljubljana

East Germany – Norway 13:4 (4:1, 5:0, 4:3)

1. March 1969 – Ljubljana

West Germany – Romania 6:2 (2:2, 2:0, 2:0)

1. March 1969 – Ljubljana

Yugoslavia – Italy 2:1 (0:0, 2:0, 0:1)

2. March 1969 – Ljubljana

Poland – Austria 9:1 (2:0, 3:0, 4:1)

2. March 1969 – Ljubljana

East Germany – Romania 11:2 (2:1, 4:1, 5:0)

3. March 1969 – Ljubljana

West Germany – Norway 5:0 (0:0, 1:0, 4:0)

3. March 1969 – Ljubljana

Poland – Italy 5:2 (0:0, 2:1, 3:1)

3. March 1969 – Ljubljana

Yugoslavia – Austria 2:1 (0:0, 1:0, 1:1)

3. March 1969 – Ljubljana

Norway – Romania 5:4 (2:1, 3:1, 0:2)

4. March 1969 – Ljubljana

West Germany – East Germany 1:6 (0:1, 1:0, 0:5)

4. March 1969 – Ljubljana

Austria – Italy 3:1 (0:0, 2:0, 1:1)

5. March 1969 – Ljubljana

Yugoslavia – Poland 1:4 (1:2, 0:0, 0:2)

5. March 1969 – Ljubljana

East Germany – Austria 11:3 (1:1, 7:1, 3:1)

6. March 1969 – Ljubljana

Poland – Norway 5:1 (4:0, 1:1, 0:0)

6. March 1969 – Ljubljana

West Germany – Italy 5:1 (2:0, 1:1, 2:0)

6. March 1969 – Ljubljana

Yugoslavia – Romania 4:4 (0:1, 3:3, 1:0)

6. March 1969 – Ljubljana

Yugoslavia – Norway 3:3 (0:2, 2:0, 1:1)

8. March 1969 – Ljubljana

West Germany – Austria 8:0 (2:0, 2:0, 4:0)

8. March 1969 – Ljubljana

Romania – Italy 5:2 (0:1, 0:0, 5:1)

8. March 1969 – Ljubljana

East Germany – Poland 4:1 (2:1, 1:0, 1:0)

8. March 1969 – Ljubljana

Norway – Italy 10:2 (6:0, 3:2, 1:0)

9. March 1969 – Ljubljana

Poland – West Germany 3:2 (1:0, 1:1, 1:1)

9. March 1969 – Ljubljana

Romania – Austria 5:4 (0:1, 2:3, 3:0)

9. March 1969 – Ljubljana

Yugoslavia – East Germany 1:6 (0:1, 0:4, 1:1)

9. March 1969 – Ljubljana

== World Championship Group C (Yugoslavia) ==
		JPN	SUI	HUN	NED	BUL	DEN	W	T	L	GF–GA	PTS
15.	Japan	***	5:2	6:3	11:0	3:4	11:1	4	0	1	36:10	8
16.	Switzerland	2:5	***	11:1	8:0	11:1	9:0	4	0	1	41:9	8
17.	Hungary	3:6	1:11	***	13:1	5:3	4:1	3	0	2	26:22	6
18.	Netherlands	0:11	0:8	1:13	***	7:5	4:3	2	0	3	12:40	4
19.	Bulgaria	4:3	3:11	3:5	5:7	***	4:2	2	0	3	19:28	4
20.	Denmark	1:11	0:9	1:4	3:4	2:4	***	0	0	5	7:32	0

- Japan, and Switzerland were promoted to the 1970 Pool B tournament. Later Bulgaria was elevated as well to fill the vacancy left by Poland.

Japan – Bulgaria 3:4 (0:0, 2:2, 1:2)

24. February 1969 – Skopje

Switzerland – Hungary 11:1 (3:0, 4:0, 4:1)

24. February 1969 – Skopje

Netherlands – Denmark 4:3 (2:0, 0:2, 2:1)

24. February 1969 – Skopje

Switzerland – Netherlands 8:0 (2:0, 3:0, 3:0)

25. February 1969 – Skopje

Hungary – Bulgaria 5:3 (2:1, 2:2, 1:0)

26. February 1969 – Skopje

Japan – Denmark 11:1 (1:1, 5:0, 5:0)

26. February 1969 – Skopje

Netherlands – Bulgaria 7:5 (2:2, 4:1, 1:2)

27. February 1969 – Skopje

Japan – Hungary 6:3 (0:1, 4:1, 2:1)

27. February 1969 – Skopje

Switzerland – Denmark 9:0 (3:0, 5:0, 1:0)

27. February 1969 – Skopje

Japan – Netherlands 11:0 (5:0, 4:0, 2:0)

28. February 1969 – Skopje

Hungary – Denmark 4:1 (1:0, 1:1, 2:0)

1. March 1969 – Skopje

Switzerland – Bulgaria 11:3 (5:0, 3:3, 3:0)

1. March 1969 – Skopje

Bulgaria – Denmark 4:2 (1:1, 3:1, 0:0)

2. March 1969 – Skopje

Hungary – Netherlands 13:1 (5:0, 3:0, 5:1)

2. March 1969 – Skopje

Japan – Switzerland 5:2 (3:0, 1:2, 1:0)

2. March 1969 – Skopje

== Ranking and statistics ==
1969 IIHF World Championship winners

Soviet Union
9th title

=== Tournament Awards ===
- Best players selected by the directorate:
  - Best Goaltender: (Sweden) Leif Holmqvist
  - Best Defenceman: (Czechoslovakia) Jan Suchý
  - Best Forward: (Sweden) Ulf Sterner
- Media All-Star Team:
  - Goaltender: (Czechoslovakia) Vladimír Dzurilla
  - Defence: (Czechoslovakia) Jan Suchý, (Sweden) Lennart Svedberg
  - Forwards: (Soviet Union) Anatoli Firsov, (Czechoslovakia) Václav Nedomanský, (Sweden) Ulf Sterner

=== Final standings ===
The final standings of the tournament according to IIHF:

Gold medal	Soviet Union
Silver medal	Sweden
Bronze medal	Czechoslovakia
4	Canada
5	Finland
6	United States

=== European championships final standings ===
The final standings of the European championships according to IIHF:

Gold medal	Soviet Union
Silver medal	Sweden
Bronze medal	Czechoslovakia
4	Finland

== See also ==
- Czechoslovak Hockey Riots - developed as a direct result of the competition.
