= Vyacheslav Starshinov =

Russian ice hockey player (born 1940)

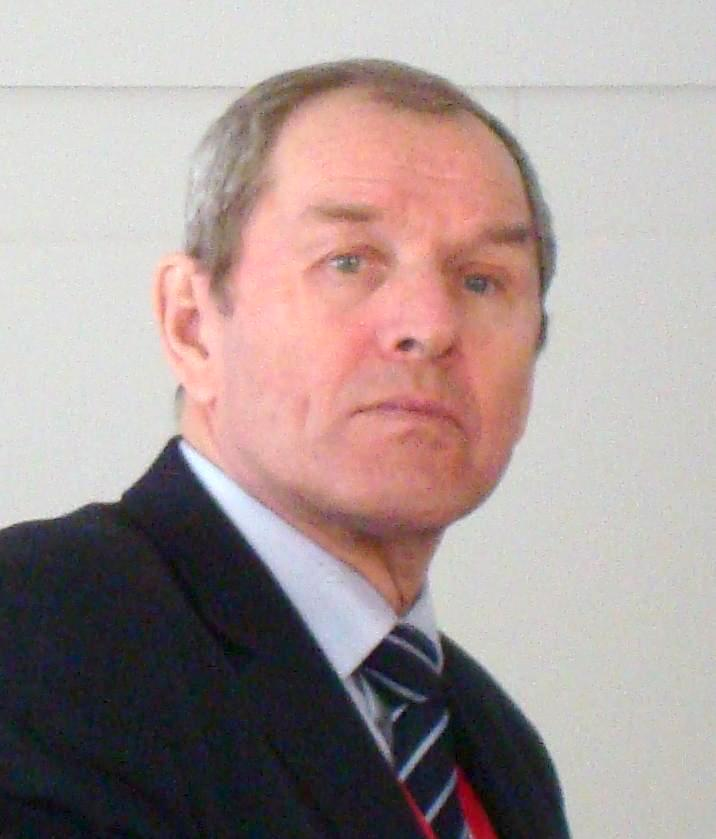
- Vyacheslav Starshinov in 2011
- Born: May 6, 1940 (age 86) Moscow, Russian SFSR, Soviet Union
- Height: 5 ft 8 in (173 cm)
- Weight: 181 lb (82 kg; 12 st 13 lb)
- Position: Centre
- Shot: Right
- Played for: HC Spartak Moscow; Oji Seishi
- Playing career: 1957–1969
Medal record
Men's ice hockey
Representing Soviet Union
Olympic Games
Gold medal – first place	1964 Innsbruck	Team
Gold medal – first place	1968 Grenoble	Team
World Championships
Bronze medal – third place	1961 Switzerland	Team
Gold medal – first place	1963 Stockholm	Team
Gold medal – first place	1964 Innsbruck	Team
Gold medal – first place	1965 Tampere	Team
Gold medal – first place	1966 Ljubljana	Team
Gold medal – first place	1967 Vienna	Team
Gold medal – first place	1968 Grenoble	Team
Gold medal – first place	1969 Stockholm	Team
Gold medal – first place	1970 Stockholm	Team
Gold medal – first place	1971 Bern	Team

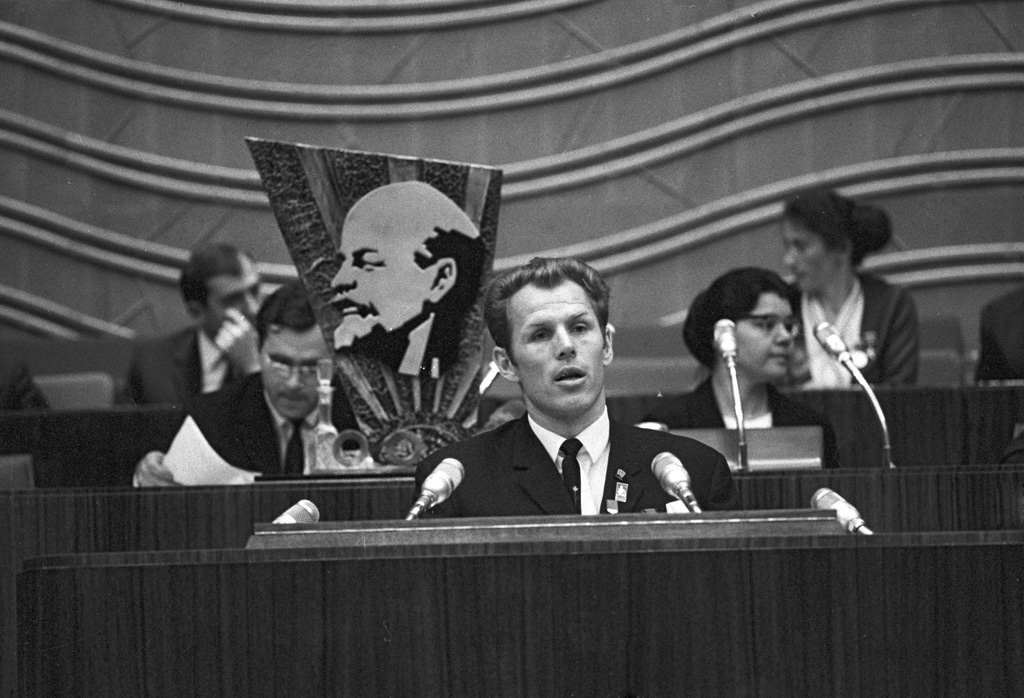
Vyacheslav Starshinov, a delegate to the 16th Congress of the Young Communist League, speaking to the Congress.

Vyacheslav Ivanovich Starshinov (Russian: Вячеслав Иванович Старшинов; born May 6, 1940, in Moscow, Soviet Union) is a Russian former ice hockey player, coach and executive. Starshinov played in the Soviet Hockey League for HC Spartak Moscow, scoring 405 goals in 540 league games. He led the league in goals in 1966–67, 1967–68, and 1968–69. Starshinov also scored 149 goals in 182 international games with the Soviet national team, and was named top forward at the IIHF World Championships in 1965. He also played for the Japanese hockey team Oji Eagles in 1976–1978.

He was inducted into the Russian and Soviet Hockey Hall of Fame in 1963 and the IIHF Hall of Fame in 2007.

== Career ==
Starshinov first played for Spartak in the 1957–58 season, earning a regular position in the 1958–59 season, in which he scored 12 goals. Starshinov would play for Spartak until 1972, when he would change over to coaching. His best season for Spartak was 1966–67, when he scored 47 goals and 9 assists for 56 points in 44 games. He first played for the national team in 1961 in the World Championships contributing six goals and three assists in seven games. He would be a member of the national team in World Championships until 1971. During this time the team won nine world championship tournaments and twice won the Olympic ice hockey tournament. In 1972, he turned to coaching Spartak, but before coaching, he played in the second game of the 1972 Summit Series versus the NHL professionals of Team Canada. In 1974–75, he returned to play for Spartak for one season before moving to Japan to play and coach Oji Eagles. He was one of the first Soviet ice-hockey players to get to play for a foreign club. In 1978, he returned to Spartak to play one final season, scoring 11 goals and seven assists in 37 games.

In 1979, Starshinov joined the Moscow Engineering Physics Institute, as head of the Department of Physical Education. He was named chairman of the Ice Hockey Federation of the Russian Federation in 1991. In 2002, Starshinov was named president of Spartak. In 2004, Starshinov was named president of the Association of Sports Industry (APSI).

== Awards and honours ==
- Honoured Master of Sport of the USSR (1963)
- Order of the Red Banner of Labour (30 March 1965)
- Order of the Badge of Honour (24 July 1968)
- Order of Friendship (19 April 1995, in connection with the 60th anniversary of the society "Spartacus")
- Olympic Order (2000)
- Order "For Merit to the Fatherland", 3rd class (26 April 2000)
- Inducted into the IIHF Hall of Fame in 2007.
- Order "For Merit to the Fatherland", 4th class (18 January 2007) - for outstanding contribution to the development of national sport
- Order of Honour (23 August 2010)
- Order "For Merit to the Fatherland", 2nd class (26 January 2023)

== Career statistics ==
=== International ===
Year	Team	Event	GP	G	A	Pts	PIM
1961	Soviet Union	WC	7	6	3	9	11
1963	Soviet Union	WC	7	8	3	11	10
1964	Soviet Union	OLY	8	8	3	11	6
1965	Soviet Union	WC	7	6	2	8	12
1966	Soviet Union	WC	7	11	1	12	8
1967	Soviet Union	WC	7	4	2	6	2
1968	Soviet Union	OLY	7	6	6	12	2
1969	Soviet Union	WC	10	6	1	7	6
1970	Soviet Union	WC	9	5	3	8	6
1971	Soviet Union	WC	9	4	5	9	6
1972	Soviet Union	SS	1	0	0	0	0
Senior totals			79	64	29	93	69

Awards
Preceded by Victor Polupanov	Soviet Scoring Champion; 1968	Succeeded by Alexander Yakushev
