= Viktor Konovalenko =

Soviet Union ice hockey player

- Born: 11 March 1938 Gorky, Russian SFSR, Soviet Union
- Died: 20 February 1996 (aged 57)
- Height: 5 ft 6 in (168 cm)
- Weight: 165 lb (75 kg; 11 st 11 lb)
- Position: Goaltender
- Caught: Left
- Played for: Torpedo Gorky
- National team: Soviet Union
- Playing career: 1956–1972
Medal record
Representing the Soviet Union
Olympic Games
Gold medal – first place	1964 Innsbruck	Team
Gold medal – first place	1968 Grenoble	Team
World Championships
Bronze medal – third place	1961 Switzerland	Team
Gold medal – first place	1963 Sweden	Team
Gold medal – first place	1964 Innsbruck	Team
Gold medal – first place	1965 Finland	Team
Gold medal – first place	1966 Yugoslavia	Team
Gold medal – first place	1967 Austria	Team
Gold medal – first place	1968 Grenoble	Team
Gold medal – first place	1970 Sweden	Team
Gold medal – first place	1971 Switzerland	Team

Viktor Sergeyevich Konovalenko (Russian: Виктор Сергеевич Коноваленко; 11 March 1938 – 20 February 1996) was a Soviet ice hockey goaltender. He led the Soviet team to the Olympics gold medals in 1964 and 1968, to the IIHF World Championships title in 1963–1968, 1970 and 1971, and to the European title in 1963–68 and 1970. He was named the most valuable player in the Soviet league in 1970.

Konovalenko played his entire career from 1956 to 1972 for Torpedo Gorky (now Torpedo Nizhny Novgorod); he never won a national title, and once placed second (in 1961). As a goaltender of the Soviet team he replaced Nikolai Puchkov, and in 1971, he was succeeded by Vladislav Tretiak. In retirement he worked as a goaltender coach with Torpedo Gorky and later became director of the Torpedo Gorky sports arena, which was renamed to the Konovalenko Sports Palace after his death.

Konovalenko was posthumously inducted into the IIHF Hall of Fame in 2007.

Preceded by Anatoli Firsov	Soviet MVP; 1970	Succeeded by Anatoli Firsov
