= Evgeni Paladiev =

Soviet ice hockey player (1948–2010)

- Born: May 12, 1948 Ust-Kamenogorsk, Kazakh SSR, Soviet Union
- Died: January 9, 2010 (aged 61)
- Height: 5 ft 11 in (180 cm)
- Weight: 182 lb (83 kg; 13 st 0 lb)
- Position: Defense
- Shot: Left
- Played for: Torpedo Ust-Kamenogorsk; Spartak Moscow; SKA MVO Lipetsk
- National team: Soviet Union
- Playing career: 1965–1976
Medal record
World Championships
Gold medal – first place	1969 Sweden	Team
Gold medal – first place	1970 Sweden	Team
Gold medal – first place	1973 Soviet Union	Team

Yevgeny Ivanovich Paladiev Евгений Иванович Паладьев (May 12, 1948 – January 9, 2010) was an ice hockey player who played in the Soviet Hockey League. He was born in Ust-Kamenogorsk, Kazakh SSR, USSR.

Paladiev played for HC Spartak Moscow and was inducted into the Soviet Hockey Hall of Fame in 1969.

== Career stats ==
=== International ===
Year	Team	Event	GP	G	A	Pts	PIM
1969	Soviet Union	WC	10	4	3	7	12
1970	Soviet Union	WC	10	0	2	2	4
1972	Soviet Union	SS	3	0	0	0	0
1973	Soviet Union	WC	8	0	5	5	0
