= Alexander Ragulin =

Russian ice hockey player (1941–2004)

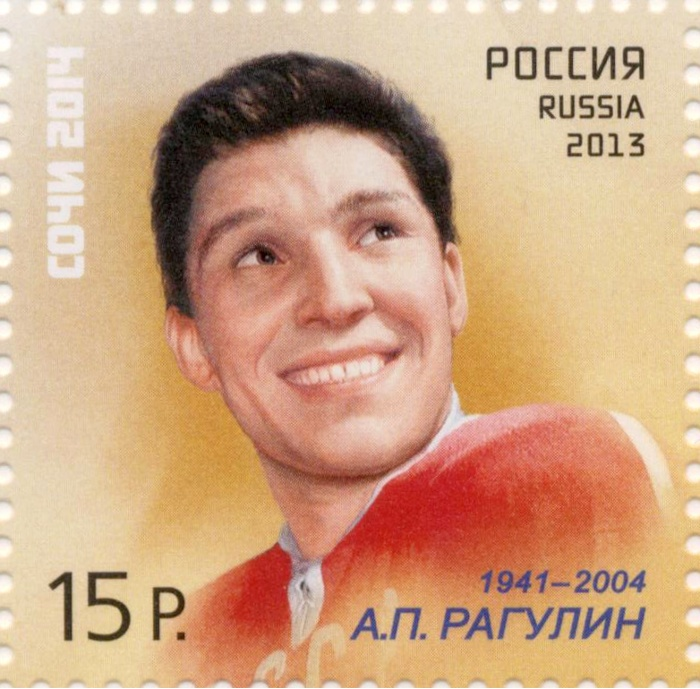
- Alexander Ragulin on a 2013 Russian stamp from the series "Sports Legends"
- Born: 5 May 1941 Moscow, Russian SFSR, Soviet Union
- Died: 17 November 2004 (aged 63) Moscow, Russia
- Height: 6 ft 1 in (185 cm)
- Weight: 231 lb (105 kg; 16 st 7 lb)
- Position: Defense
- Shoots: Left
- Played for: CSKA Moscow; Khimik Voskresensk
- National team: Soviet Union

Alexander Ragulin
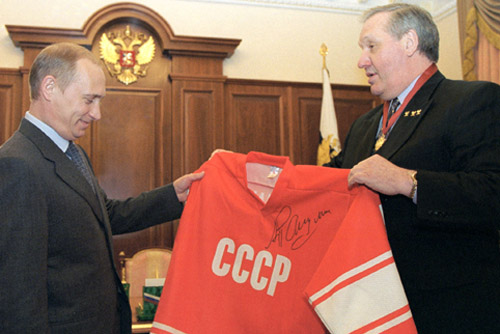
- Ragulin presents his signed uniform to President Vladimir Putin in 2001

Medal record

Representing Soviet Union

Olympic Games
Gold medal – first place	1964 Innsbruck	
Gold medal – first place	1968 Grenoble	
Gold medal – first place	1972 Sapporo	

World Championships
Bronze medal – third place	1961 Geneva	
Gold medal – first place	1963 Stockholm	
Gold medal – first place	1965 Tampere	
Gold medal – first place	1966 Ljubljana	
Gold medal – first place	1967 Vienna	
Gold medal – first place	1969 Stockholm	
Gold medal – first place	1970 Stockholm	
Gold medal – first place	1971 Bern	
Silver medal – second place	1972 Prague	
Gold medal – first place	1973 Moscow	

Alexander Pavlovich Ragulin (Russian: Александр Павлович Рагулин; 5 May 1941 – 17 November 2004) was a Russian ice hockey player widely regarded as one of the greatest defensemen in Soviet hockey history. Over his illustrious career, he captured three Olympic gold medals and ten World Championship titles. In recognition of his achievements, he was inducted into the IIHF Hall of Fame in 1997 and was awarded the Olympic Order in Silver in 2001.

== Playing career ==
Ragulin began his ice hockey career in 1957, training and playing alongside his brothers Anatoly and Mikhail at Khimik Voskresensk. In 1962, he joined the elite CSKA Moscow club, where he remained until his retirement in 1973. During his time with CSKA, he captured nine Soviet league championships (1963–66, 1968, 1970–73) and secured five consecutive European Champions Cups from 1969 to 1973. Representing the Soviet national team for 13 years, Ragulin appeared in 239 games and tallied 29 goals. In addition to his Olympic and World Championship victories, he claimed nine European Championship gold medals (1963–70, 1973) and three silver medals (1961, 1971, 1972), and was honored as the top defenseman at the 1966 World Championships. Notably, he played in six of the eight games in the 1972 Summit Series against Canada. After retiring as a player, Ragulin coached SKA Novosibirsk and worked with youth players at the CSKA Moscow sports school. His contributions to the sport were recognized with his induction into the IIHF Hall of Fame in 1997 and the awarding of the Olympic Order in Silver in 2001.
