= Czechoslovak hockey riots =

1969 anti-Soviet protests

- Part of the Cold War and aftermath of the Warsaw Pact invasion of Czechoslovakia
- Date: March 1969
- Location: Prague, Czechoslovakia
- Caused by: Soviet occupation of Czechoslovakia; 1969 Ice Hockey World Championships
- Result: Riots suppressed; Resignation of KSČ First Secretary Alexander Dubček

Parties
Soviet Union; Ministry of Defense; Soviet Armed Forces; Soviet Army; Czechoslovakia; KSČ; (Czechoslovakia) Ministry of National Defense; ČSLA; SNB / ZNB; StB	(Czechoslovakia) Anti-Soviet occupation protesters

Number
Unknown	500,000 Czechoslovak fans

The Czechoslovak hockey riots were a short lived series of protests, mildly violent on occasion (several people were injured), that took place in response to the 1969 World Ice Hockey Championships.

After the Soviet invasion into Czechoslovakia the political ideals of the Prague Spring were slowly but steadily replaced by politics of accommodation to the demands of the Soviet Union. People in Czechoslovakia, unable to find other ways to express their opinion, reacted with few very visible but ultimately ineffective manifestations of disagreement.

On 21 and 28 March 1969, the Czechoslovakia national ice hockey team beat the Soviet team in the 1969 World Ice Hockey Championships in Stockholm. Throughout Czechoslovakia, possibly 500,000 fans crowded the streets of their cities to celebrate the wins. In some places, particularly Prague, the celebrations turned to protests against the Soviet military who continued to occupy the country after the Warsaw Pact invasion the previous August. The first night the celebrating fans vocally started showing their displeasure with the military oversight cheering and chanting "No tanks were there so they lost!" The next night many of the protesters had brought signs they created showing the score of the second game (4-3), and chants stating "Czechoslovakia 4 – Occupation forces 3!" While the majority of these demonstrations were peaceful, some turned violent as protesters attacked Soviet military units. In Prague, protesters ransacked the Soviet Aeroflot office on the Wenceslas Square, though some have suggested they were encouraged by State Security agents.

The protests were suppressed by the Czechoslovak military and police, now under full control of the hardliners from the Communist Party. The events were used as a pretext to oust the remaining leaders of the Prague Spring. Among them, Alexander Dubček was forced to resign as First Secretary of the Communist Party of Czechoslovakia, to be replaced by Gustáv Husák who started the politics of "normalisation".

During the years of normalization, citizens of Czechoslovakia saw hockey games against Soviet Union as a quiet, symbolic way to protest. Police forces were regularly set on alert but never used.
