= Ab DeMarco Jr. =

American ice hockey player (1949–2026)

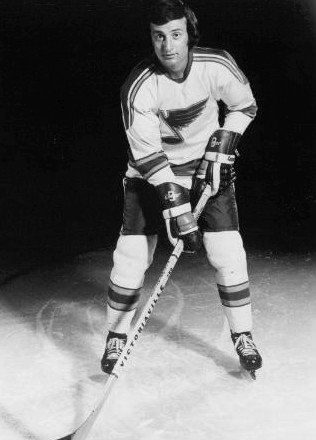
- Born: February 27, 1949 Cleveland, Ohio, U.S.
- Died: June 21, 2026 (aged 77)
- Height: 6 ft 0 in (183 cm)
- Weight: 170 lb (77 kg; 12 st 2 lb)
- Position: Defence
- Shot: Right
- Played for: New York Rangers; St. Louis Blues; Pittsburgh Penguins; Vancouver Canucks; Los Angeles Kings; Edmonton Oilers; Boston Bruins
- National team: Canada
- Playing career: 1969–1979

Albert Thomas "Ab" DeMarco Jr. (February 27, 1949 – June 21, 2026) was an American-born Canadian professional ice hockey defenceman who played in the National Hockey League (NHL) and World Hockey Association (WHA) during the 1970s. DeMarco was noted for his shot, considered one of the hardest in the sport at the time. He was the son of Ab DeMarco Sr., who starred for the New York Rangers in the 1940s.

== Playing career ==
DeMarco was born in the United States while his father was playing for the American Hockey League (AHL) Cleveland Barons, but was raised in North Bay, Ontario. He played his junior hockey for the Kitchener Rangers and, after representing Canada at the 1969 Ice Hockey World Championships, he was signed by the New York Rangers, the team with which his father spent the majority of his career.

He played his first two professional seasons in the CHL minor league, earning brief NHL call-ups to New York. In 1971–72, he played with the Rangers full-time, appearing in two-thirds of the scheduled games, recording 4 goals and 11 points in 48 games. Late in the 1972–73 season, DeMarco was dealt to the St. Louis Blues. Given an opportunity to play more and receive time on the power play, DeMarco responded with 13 points in 14 games, to give him a total of 30 points on the season.

Early into the next season, DeMarco was traded to the Pittsburgh Penguins. This would be the pattern of his career, as he would become something of a nomad, as offense-starved teams would pick him up to help their power play, but eventually grow frustrated at his poor defensive play, and he would find himself on the move again. He finished the 1973–74 season with a career-high 31 points in 59 games between St. Louis and Pittsburgh.

Early in the 1974–75 NHL season, DeMarco was traded to the Vancouver Canucks. In Vancouver, he posted a career-high 12 goals, playing a career-high 69 (of 78) games, helping the team to a division championship and their first-ever playoff berth. His 9 power-play goals for a blueliner that season ranked behind only Bobby Orr and Guy Lapointe.

After a poor offensive start to the 1975–76 NHL season, DeMarco was traded to the Los Angeles Kings, and his offensive output fell to 18 points in 64 games. DeMarco spent most of the 1976–77 season in the minors, appearing in just 33 games for LA and scoring 6 points.

DeMarco then jumped to the rival World Hockey Association, signing with the Edmonton Oilers for the 1977–78 WHA season. He spent just one season in Edmonton, registering 6 goals and 14 points in 47 games.

He returned to the NHL for the 1978–79 season, signing with the Boston Bruins, but appeared in only three games for the team. After a season in Switzerland, he retired in 1980. He finished his career with totals of 44 goals and 80 assists for 124 points in 344 NHL games over 9 seasons.

== Death ==
DeMarco died on June 21, 2026, at the age of 77. He had three daughters.

== Career statistics ==
=== Regular season and playoffs ===
			Regular season					Playoffs
Season	Team	League	GP	G	A	Pts	PIM	GP	G	A	Pts	PIM
1964–65	North Bay Trappers	NOJHL	4	0	3	3	0	9	0	6	6	12
1965–66	North Bay Trappers	NOJHL	26	4	19	23	16	12	0	10	10	2
1966–67	North Bay Trappers	NOJHL	38	11	35	46	22	1	1	0	1	0
1967–68	Kitchener Rangers	OHA	49	9	30	39	24	19	13	11	24	21
1968–69	Ottawa Nationals	OHA Sr	8	4	8	12	7	—	—	—	—	—
1969–70	New York Rangers	NHL	3	0	0	0	0	5	0	0	0	2
1969–70	Omaha Knights	CHL	60	6	30	36	19	—	—	—	—	—
1970–71	New York Rangers	NHL	2	0	1	1	0	—	—	—	—	—
1970–71	Omaha Knights	CHL	54	17	25	42	18	—	—	—	—	—
1971–72	New York Rangers	NHL	48	4	7	11	4	4	0	1	1	0
1972–73	New York Rangers	NHL	51	4	13	17	15	—	—	—	—	—
1972–73	St. Louis Blues	NHL	14	4	9	13	2	4	1	1	2	2
1973–74	St. Louis Blues	NHL	23	3	9	12	11	—	—	—	—	—
1973–74	Pittsburgh Penguins	NHL	34	7	12	19	4	—	—	—	—	—
1974–75	Pittsburgh Penguins	NHL	8	2	1	3	4	—	—	—	—	—
1974–75	Vancouver Canucks	NHL	61	10	14	24	21	2	0	0	0	0
1975–76	Vancouver Canucks	NHL	34	3	8	11	2	—	—	—	—	—
1975–76	Los Angeles Kings	NHL	30	4	3	7	6	9	0	0	0	11
1976–77	Los Angeles Kings	NHL	33	3	3	6	6	1	0	0	0	2
1976–77	Fort Worth Texans	CHL	31	4	15	19	20	—	—	—	—	—
1977–78	Edmonton Oilers	WHA	47	6	8	14	20	1	0	0	0	0
1978–79	Boston Bruins	NHL	3	0	0	0	0	—	—	—	—	—
1978–79	HC Ambrì–Piotta	NLB	19	14	9	23	39	—	—	—	—	—
1979–80	HC Ambrì–Piotta	NLB	33	22	20	42	58	—	—	—	—	—
WHA totals			47	6	8	14	20	1	0	0	0	0
NHL totals			344	44	80	124	75	25	1	2	3	17

=== International ===
Year	Team	Event	GP	G	A	Pts	PIM
1969	Canada	WC	9	1	0	1	6
Senior totals			9	1	0	1	6
