= List of Soviet and Russian ice hockey scoring champions =

The following is a list of the annual point scoring champions of the top Russian ice hockey league of each era, from the Soviet Championship League to the current Kontinental Hockey League.

== Soviet Championship ==
- 1965–66 Anatoli Firsov – CSKA Moscow
- 1966–67 Victor Polupanov – CSKA Moscow
- 1967–68 Vyacheslav Starshinov – Spartak Moscow
- 1968–69 Alexander Yakushev – Spartak Moscow
- 1969–70 Vladimir Petrov – CSKA Moscow
- 1970–71 Alexander Maltsev – Dynamo Moscow
- 1971–72 Valeri Kharlamov – CSKA Moscow
- 1972–73 Vladimir Petrov – CSKA Moscow
- 1973–74 Vyacheslav Anisin – Krylya Sovetov
- 1974–75 Vladimir Petrov – CSKA Moscow
- 1975–76 Viktor Shalimov – Spartak Moscow
- 1976–77 Helmuts Balderis – Dinamo Riga
- 1977–78 Vladimir Petrov – CSKA Moscow
- 1978–79 Vladimir Petrov – CSKA Moscow
- 1979–80 Sergei Makarov – CSKA Moscow
- 1980–81 Sergei Makarov – CSKA Moscow
- 1981–82 Sergei Makarov – CSKA Moscow
- 1982–83 Helmuts Balderis – Dinamo Riga
- 1983–84 Sergei Makarov – CSKA Moscow
- 1984–85 Sergei Makarov – CSKA Moscow
- 1985–86 Sergei Makarov – CSKA Moscow
- 1986–87 Sergei Makarov – CSKA Moscow
- 1987–88 Sergei Makarov – CSKA Moscow
- 1988–89 Sergei Makarov – CSKA Moscow
- 1989–90 Dmitri Kvartalnov – Khimik Voskresensk
- 1990–91 Ramil Yuldashev – Sokil Kiev

== CIS Championship ==
- 1991–92 Roman Oksiuta – Khimik Voskresensk

== International Hockey League ==
- 1992–93 Alexei Tkachuk – Spartak Moscow
- 1993–94 Dmitri Denisov – Salavat Yulaev Ufa
- 1994–95 Dmitri Denisov – Salavat Yulaev Ufa
- 1995–96 Alexander Korolyuk – Krylya Sovetov

== Russian Superleague ==
- 1996–97 Nikolai Borschevsky – Spartak Moscow
- 1997–98 Andrei Tarasenko – Lada Togliatti
- 1998–99 Yevgeni Koreshkov – Metallurg Magnitogorsk
- 1999–2000 Georgy Yevtyukhin – Metallurg Novokuznetsk
- 2000–01 Andrei Razin – Metallurg Magnitogorsk
- 2001–02 Maxim Sushinsky – Avangard Omsk
- 2002–03 Tomáš Vlasák – Avangard Omsk; Pavel Patera – Avangard Omsk
- 2003–04 Maxim Sushinsky – Avangard Omsk
- 2004–05 Maxim Sushinsky – Avangard Omsk
- 2005–06 Sergei Mozyakin – CSKA Moscow
- 2006–07 Alexei Morozov – Ak Bars Kazan
- 2007–08 Sergei Mozyakin – Atlant Moscow Oblast

== Kontinental Hockey League ==
- 2008–09 Sergei Mozyakin – Atlant Moscow Oblast
- 2009–10 Sergei Mozyakin – Atlant Moscow Oblast
- 2010–11 Alexander Radulov – Salavat Yulaev Ufa
- 2011–12 Alexander Radulov – Salavat Yulaev Ufa
- 2012–13 Sergei Mozyakin – Metallurg Magnitogorsk
- 2013–14 Sergei Mozyakin – Metallurg Magnitogorsk
- 2014–15 Alexander Radulov – CSKA Moscow
- 2015–16 Sergei Mozyakin – Metallurg Magnitogorsk
- 2016–17 Sergei Mozyakin – Metallurg Magnitogorsk
- 2017–18 Ilya Kovalchuk – SKA Saint Petersburg
- 2018–19 Nikita Gusev – SKA Saint Petersburg
- 2019–20 Vadim Shipachyov – Dynamo Moscow
- 2020–21 Vadim Shipachyov – Dynamo Moscow
- 2021–22 Vadim Shipachyov – Dynamo Moscow
- 2022–23 Dmitrij Jaškin – SKA Saint Petersburg
- 2023–24 Nikita Gusev – Dynamo Moscow
- 2024–25 Josh Leivo – Salavat Yulaev Ufa
- 2025–26 Sam Anas – Dynamo Minsk

== See also ==
- List of Soviet and Russian ice hockey champions
- List of Soviet and Russian ice hockey goal scoring champions
- Soviet MVP (hockey)

== Sources ==
- Internet Hockey Database
- CCCP Hockey International
- A to Z Encyclopedia of Ice Hockey
