= Anatoli Firsov =

Russian ice hockey player (1941–2000)

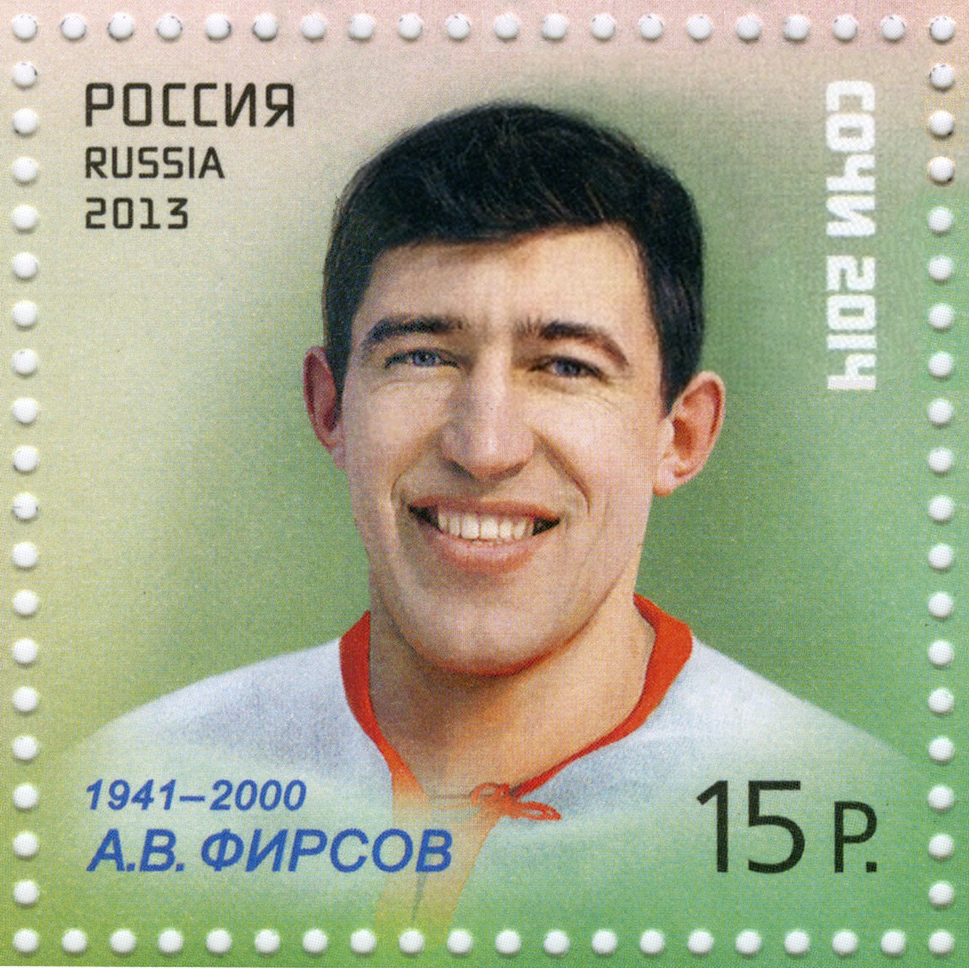
- Anatoli Firsov on a 2013 Russian stamp from the series "Sports Legends"
- Born: 1 February 1941 Moscow, Russian SFSR, Soviet Union
- Died: 24 July 2000 (aged 59) Moscow, Russia
- Height: 5 ft 9 in (175 cm)
- Weight: 154 lb (70 kg; 11 st 0 lb)
- Position: Left wing
- Shot: Right
- Played for: Spartak Moscow; CSKA Moscow
- National team: Soviet Union
- Playing career: 1959–1974
Medal record
Men's ice hockey
Representing Soviet Union
Olympic Games
Gold medal – first place	1964 Innsbruck	Team
Gold medal – first place	1968 Grenoble	Team
Gold medal – first place	1972 Sapporo	Team
World Championships
Gold medal – first place	1964 Innsbruck	Team
Gold medal – first place	1965 Tampere	Team
Gold medal – first place	1966 Ljubljana	Team
Gold medal – first place	1967 Vienna	Team
Gold medal – first place	1968 Grenoble	Team
Gold medal – first place	1969 Stockholm	Team
Gold medal – first place	1970 Stockholm	Team
Gold medal – first place	1971 Bern	Team

Anatoli Vasilievich Firsov (Russian: Анатолий Васильевич Фирсов; 1 February 1941 – 24 July 2000) was a Russian ice hockey left wing and center, who competed internationally for the USSR. In the IIHF World Championships, he won the scoring title four times and was named the best forward three times. He was also named the most valuable player in the Soviet hockey league three times. Between 1964 and 1972, Firsov played 166 games for the national team. He scored 134 goals, and won three Olympic and eight world titles.

Firsov played in HC CSKA Moscow. He eventually would become one of the best forwards in Soviet hockey. Despite this he would not participate in the 1972 Summit Series against Canada. Many believe this was a result of Anatoli Tarasov's exclusion from the coaching staff.

In 1972, while still playing for CSKA Moscow, Firsov began working as an assistant coach for the club. Between 1976 and 77 he was the head coach of the Soviet junior team, which won a bronze medal at the 1977 World Championship. From 1977 and until his death he worked as a children's hockey coach. In 1989, Firsov was elected to the Congress of People's Deputies, running on a policy of improving health conditions and sporting facilities. In 1998, he was inducted to the IIHF Hall of Fame. Firsov died in 2000 at the age of 59.

== Early life ==
Firsov was born and raised in Moscow on February 1, 1941. The family consisted of three children. When Firsov was only one month old, his father was killed in action during World War II and thus, he was raised by a single mother. Growing up, Firsov's family experienced economic hardship. His mother worked at a kindergarten which was not a well paying job. Initially, Firsov did not play ice hockey. Instead, he played bandy which was more popular than ice hockey at the time in the Soviet Union. The two sports share many similarities. One of the biggest differences between bandy and ice hockey is that the former uses a ball while the latter uses a puck. Firsov first played bandy as a member of his backyard team. He was initially slotted in as a defenceman, a position that was usually reserved for undersized kids and kids with no equipment. During the summer, Firsov would play football which helped keep him in shape all year long. Due to the lack of money in the family, Firsov had to make his own stick and skates. His stick consisted of a shaft carved from a cherry tree and the blade of his stick was made from shaft bows which he acquired by stealing from horse yards at night. The sticks broke easily and Firsov had to make new ones regularly. Meanwhile, his skates were composed of a boot with a blade laced at the bottom with a string. Despite these setbacks, Firsov quickly became considered as one of the best young talents. At around 11 years old, he was playing against 16 year olds and at around 12 years old, he was playing against men that had served in the Army.

It was not until Firsov was around 15 years old, that he learned about ice hockey. Firsov had a little difficulty with the different equipment at the beginning. Bandy sticks had a smaller blade compared to hockey sticks and Firsov felt that the larger blade interfered a little. However, Firsov credits the larger bandy fields for strengthening his endurance as he had to skate longer distances because bandy fields would be approximately 100m in length compared to hockey's 60m in length.

== Awards ==
- Soviet MVP: 1968, 1969, and 1971
- Soviet scoring champion: 1966
- Soviet goal-scoring leader: 1966
- IIHF World Championships scoring leader: 1967, 1968, 1969, 1971
- IIHF World Championships goal-scoring leader: 1967, 1968, 1969, 1971
- IIHF World Championships best forward: 1967, 1968, 1971
- Order of the Red Banner of Labour (1972)
- two Orders of the Badge of Honor (1965 and 1968)
- Inducted into the IIHF Hall of Fame in 1998

== Bibliography ==
- A. V. Firsov (1973). To Switch on the Light of Victory (in Russian). Moscow: Fizkultura i sport. Archived from the original on 2007-07-13.

Awards
Preceded by none	Soviet MVP; 1968, 1969	Succeeded by Viktor Konovalenko
Preceded by Viktor Konovalenko	Soviet MVP; 1971	Succeeded by Valeri Kharlamov, Alexander Maltsev
Preceded by none	Soviet Scoring Champion; 1966	Succeeded by Victor Polupanov
