= Viktor Polupanov =

Soviet Russian ice hockey player

Viktor Andreevich Polupanov (born January 1, 1946, in Moscow, Soviet Union) is a retired ice hockey player who played in the Soviet Hockey League. He played for HC CSKA Moscow and Krylya Sovetov Moscow. He was inducted into the Russian and Soviet Hockey Hall of Fame in 1967.

Awards
Preceded by Anatoli Firsov	Soviet Scoring Champion; 1967	Succeeded by Vyacheslav Starshinov
