= Steve King (ice hockey) =

Canadian ice hockey player

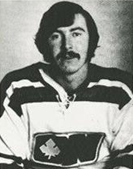
- King in 1972 photo
- Born: September 8, 1948 (age 77) Toronto, Ontario, Canada
- Height: 5 ft 9 in (175 cm)
- Weight: 170 lb (77 kg; 12 st 2 lb)
- Position: Right wing
- Shot: Right
- Played for: Ottawa Nationals; Toronto Toros
- Playing career: 1972–1974

Steven James King (born September 8, 1948) is a Canadian retired professional ice hockey right winger who played 136 games in the World Hockey Association for the Ottawa Nationals and Toronto Toros.

== Early life ==
King was born in Toronto, Ontario. As a youth, he played in the 1961 Quebec International Pee-Wee Hockey Tournament with Toronto Dileo.

== Career ==
Before turning professional, he competed internationally with the Canada men's national ice hockey team that won the 1969 World Ice Hockey Championships. During his career, King played 136 games in the World Hockey Association for the Ottawa Nationals and Toronto Toros between 1972 and 1974.

== Career statistics ==
=== Regular season and playoffs ===
			Regular season					Playoffs
Season	Team	League	GP	G	A	Pts	PIM	GP	G	A	Pts	PIM
1966–67	Toronto Marlboros	OHA	48	15	13	28	22	—	—	—	—	—
1967–68	Toronto Marlboros	OHA	47	15	20	35	40	—	—	—	—	—
1968–69	Ottawa Nationals	OHASr	8	2	4	6	10	—	—	—	—	—
1969–70	Canadian National Team	Intl	Statistics Unavailable
1970–71	Tulsa Oilers	CHL	8	2	6	8	5	—	—	—	—	—
1971–72	Tulsa Oilers	CHL	59	20	16	36	12	13	6	8	14	2
1972–73	Ottawa Nationals	WHA	69	18	34	52	28	5	0	1	1	7
1973–74	Toronto Toros	WHA	67	14	22	36	26	12	0	3	3	11
WHA totals			23	5	7	12	4	—	—	—	—	—
