= Igor Kravchuk =

Russian ice hockey player (born 1966)

- Born: September 13, 1966 (age 60) Ufa, Russian SFSR, Soviet Union
- Height: 6 ft 1 in (185 cm)
- Weight: 218 lb (99 kg; 15 st 8 lb)
- Position: Defence
- Shot: Left
- Played for: Salavat Yulaev Ufa; CSKA Moscow; Chicago Blackhawks; Edmonton Oilers; St. Louis Blues; Ottawa Senators; Calgary Flames; Florida Panthers
- National team: Soviet Union, Unified Team and Russia
- NHL draft: 71st overall, 1991; Chicago Blackhawks
- Playing career: 1982–2003

Olympic medal record

Men's ice hockey

Representing the Soviet Union
| Gold medal – first place | 1988 Calgary | Team |

Representing the Unified Team
| Gold medal – first place | 1992 Albertville | Team |

Representing Russia
| Silver medal – second place | 1998 Nagano | Team |
| Bronze medal – third place | 2002 Salt Lake City | Team |

Igor Aleksandrovich Kravchuk (Russian: Игорь Александрович Кравчук; born September 13, 1966) is a Russian former ice hockey defenceman who spent several seasons in the Soviet League and then in the National Hockey League and also competed internationally for the Soviet Union, Unified Team, and Russia.

== Playing career ==
Kravchuk started his NHL career in 1992 with the Chicago Blackhawks, who drafted him 71st overall in the 1991 NHL entry draft. Kravchuk scored in his first NHL game. He also spent time with the Edmonton Oilers, St. Louis Blues, Ottawa Senators, Calgary Flames and Florida Panthers. In all, Kravchuk played in 699 regular season games, scoring 64 goals and 210 assists for 274 points, collecting 251 penalty minutes. He also played in 51 playoff games, scoring 6 goals and 15 assists for 21 points, collecting 18 penalty minutes. Kravchuk was also a member of the Unified Team that won the gold medal at the 1992 Winter Olympics.

Two days after his 21st birthday Kravchuk was the lone defenceman facing a 3 on 1 in the final game of the 1987 Canada Cup. Mario Lemieux, Wayne Gretzky, and Larry Murphy skated in on goaltender Sergei Mylnikov and Lemieux scored the game and series winning goal at 18:34 of the third period. In addition to his 1992 Olympic gold medal, Kravchuk also won gold with the Soviet team in 1988 and two medals (silver in 1998 and bronze in 2002) with Russia. He also won numerous world championship medals at all levels.

== Career statistics ==
=== Regular season and playoffs ===
| | | | Regular season | | | | | Playoffs |
| Season | Team | League | GP | G | A | Pts | PIM | GP | G | A | Pts | PIM |
|---|---|---|---|---|---|---|---|---|---|---|---|---|
| 1982–83 | Salavat Yulaev Ufa | USSR | 10 | 0 | 0 | 0 | 0 | — | — | — | — | — |
| 1982–83 | Avangard Ufa | USSR III | 11 | 1 | 0 | 1 | 6 | — | — | — | — | — |
| 1983–84 | Salavat Yulaev Ufa | USSR II | 48 | — | — | — | — | — | — | — | — | — |
| 1984–85 | Salavat Yulaev Ufa | USSR II | 50 | 3 | 2 | 5 | 22 | — | — | — | — | — |
| 1985–86 | Salavat Yulaev Ufa | USSR | 21 | 2 | 6 | 8 | 6 | — | — | — | — | — |
| 1986–87 | Salavat Yulaev Ufa | USSR | 22 | 0 | 1 | 1 | 8 | — | — | — | — | — |
| 1987–88 | CSKA Moscow | USSR | 48 | 1 | 8 | 9 | 12 | — | — | — | — | — |
| 1988–89 | CSKA Moscow | USSR | 22 | 3 | 4 | 7 | 2 | — | — | — | — | — |
| 1989–90 | CSKA Moscow | USSR | 48 | 1 | 3 | 4 | 16 | — | — | — | — | — |
| 1990–91 | CSKA Moscow | USSR | 41 | 6 | 5 | 11 | 16 | — | — | — | — | — |
| 1991–92 | CSKA Moscow | CIS | 30 | 3 | 8 | 11 | 6 | — | — | — | — | — |
| 1991–92 | Chicago Blackhawks | NHL | 18 | 1 | 8 | 9 | 4 | 18 | 2 | 6 | 8 | 8 |
| 1992–93 | Chicago Blackhawks | NHL | 38 | 6 | 9 | 15 | 30 | — | — | — | — | — |
| 1992–93 | Edmonton Oilers | NHL | 17 | 4 | 8 | 12 | 2 | — | — | — | — | — |
| 1993–94 | Edmonton Oilers | NHL | 81 | 12 | 38 | 50 | 16 | — | — | — | — | — |
| 1994–95 | Edmonton Oilers | NHL | 36 | 7 | 11 | 18 | 29 | — | — | — | — | — |
| 1995–96 | Edmonton Oilers | NHL | 26 | 4 | 4 | 8 | 10 | — | — | — | — | — |
| 1995–96 | St. Louis Blues | NHL | 40 | 3 | 12 | 15 | 24 | 10 | 1 | 5 | 6 | 4 |
| 1996–97 | St. Louis Blues | NHL | 82 | 4 | 24 | 28 | 35 | 2 | 0 | 0 | 0 | 2 |
| 1997–98 | Ottawa Senators | NHL | 81 | 8 | 27 | 35 | 8 | 11 | 2 | 3 | 5 | 4 |
| 1998–99 | Ottawa Senators | NHL | 79 | 4 | 21 | 25 | 32 | 4 | 0 | 0 | 0 | 0 |
| 1999–2000 | Ottawa Senators | NHL | 64 | 6 | 12 | 18 | 20 | 6 | 1 | 1 | 2 | 0 |
| 2000–01 | Ottawa Senators | NHL | 15 | 1 | 5 | 6 | 14 | — | — | — | — | — |
| 2000–01 | Calgary Flames | NHL | 37 | 0 | 8 | 8 | 4 | — | — | — | — | — |
| 2001–02 | Calgary Flames | NHL | 78 | 4 | 22 | 26 | 19 | — | — | — | — | — |
| 2002–03 | Florida Panthers | NHL | 7 | 0 | 1 | 1 | 4 | — | — | — | — | — |
| USSR/CIS totals | | | 242 | 16 | 35 | 51 | 66 | — | — | — | — | — |
| NHL totals | | | 699 | 64 | 210 | 274 | 261 | 51 | 6 | 15 | 21 | 18 |

=== International ===
| Year | Team | Event | Place | GP | G | A | Pts | PIM |
|---|---|---|---|---|---|---|---|---|
| 1984 | Soviet Union | EJC | 1st place, gold medalist(s) | 5 | 1 | 1 | 2 | 6 |
| 1985 | Soviet Union | WJC | 3rd place, bronze medalist(s) | 7 | 0 | 3 | 3 | 6 |
| 1986 | Soviet Union | WJC | 1st place, gold medalist(s) | 7 | 0 | 2 | 2 | 4 |
| 1987 | Soviet Union | CC | 2nd place, silver medalist(s) | 5 | 0 | 4 | 4 | 2 |
| 1988 | Soviet Union | OG | 1st place, gold medalist(s) | 6 | 1 | 0 | 1 | 0 |
| 1990 | Soviet Union | WC | 1st place, gold medalist(s) | 10 | 1 | 4 | 5 | 8 |
| 1991 | Soviet Union | WC | 3rd place, bronze medalist(s) | 10 | 1 | 3 | 4 | 8 |
| 1991 | Soviet Union | CC | 5th | 5 | 0 | 0 | 0 | 2 |
| 1992 | Unified Team | OG | 1st place, gold medalist(s) | 8 | 3 | 2 | 5 | 6 |
| 1998 | Russia | OG | 2nd place, silver medalist(s) | 6 | 0 | 2 | 2 | 2 |
| 2000 | Russia | WC | 11th | 6 | 0 | 0 | 0 | 0 |
| 2002 | Russia | OG | 3rd place, bronze medalist(s) | 6 | 0 | 2 | 2 | 0 |
| Junior totals | | | | 19 | 1 | 6 | 7 | 16 |
| Senior totals | | | | 62 | 6 | 17 | 23 | 28 |
