= Lars-Göran Nilsson =

Swedish ice hockey player

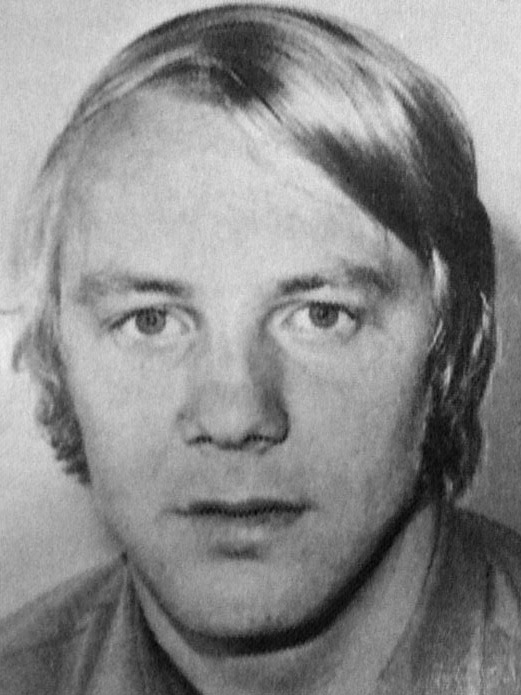
- Born: 9 March 1944 (age 82) Vuollerim, Sweden
- Height: 5 ft 10 in (178 cm)
- Weight: 165 lb (75 kg; 11 st 11 lb)
- Position: Left wing
- Shot: Left
- Played for: Brynäs IF
- National team: Sweden
- Playing career: 1963–1979

Lars-Göran Birger Nilsson (born 9 March 1944) is a retired professional ice hockey player who played in the Elitserien for Brynäs IF.

He placed fourth with the Sweden men's national ice hockey team at the 1968 and 1972 Winter Olympics. He played all 13 games (7 in 1968 and 6 in 1972) and scored two goals at each Games. He was a member of the Swedish 1976 Canada Cup team.
