= Jorma Peltonen =

Finnish ice hockey player

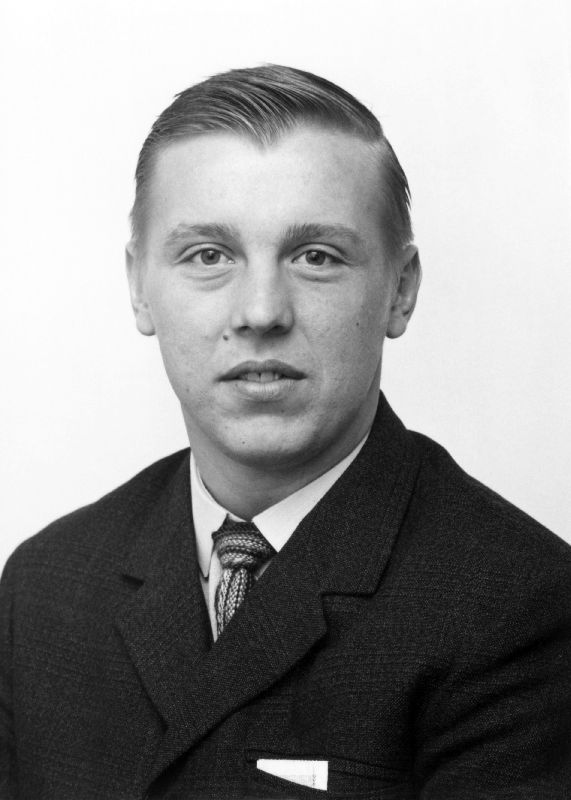
Jorma Peltonen

Jorma Kalevi Peltonen (11 January 1944 – 30 April 2010) was a Finnish professional ice hockey player who played in the SM-liiga. Born in Messukylä, Finland, he played for Ilves, Jokerit, and Lukko. He was inducted into the Finnish Hockey Hall of Fame in 1987 and died on 30 April 2010 in Tampere, Finland.
