= 1967 Ice Hockey World Championships =

1967 edition of the World Ice Hockey Championships

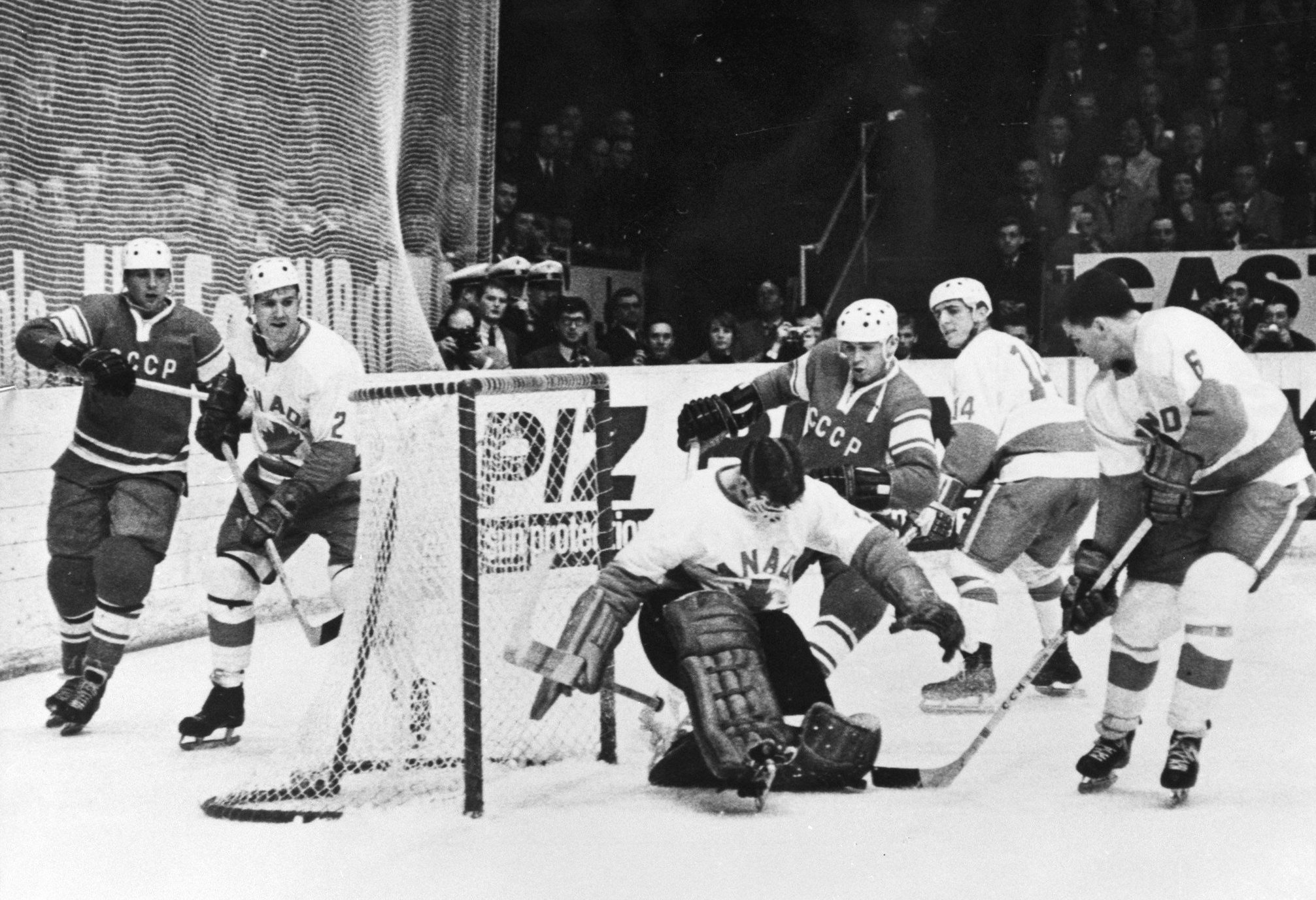
- USSR-Canada 2–1 game on 27 March

Tournament details
- Host country: Austria
- Dates: 18–29 March
- Teams: 8

Final positions
- Champions: Soviet Union (7th title)
- Runners-up: Sweden
- Third place: Canada
- Fourth place: Czechoslovakia

Tournament statistics
- Games played: 28
- Goals scored: 205 (7.32 per game)
- Attendance: 172,800 (6,171 per game)
- Scoring leader: (Soviet Union) Anatoli Firsov (22 points)

The 1967 Ice Hockey World Championships was the 34th edition of the Ice Hockey World Championships. The tournament was held in Vienna, Austria from March 18 to March 29, 1967. The Soviet Union won the tournament for the fifth straight year, Sweden won the silver medal, and Canada claimed the bronze medal.

== Host selection ==
Bids to host the event were received from the Austrian Ice Hockey Association and the Canadian Amateur Hockey Association (CAHA) in March 1965. The International Ice Hockey Federation (IIHF) voted to host the event in Austria. Canada had bid hoping to combine the event with the Canadian Centennial. CAHA second vice-president Lloyd Pollock reacted by saying, "possibly we should consider now whether or not its worth" going to future championships, in a comment that foreshadowed Canada's eventual withdrawal from the world championships in 1970.

== Summary ==
For the fifth straight year, the Soviet Union won the tournament. They won all their games claiming their seventh World championship, and eleventh European. The competition for the other medals was very close, with Sweden, Canada, and Czechoslovakia all being in contention until the end. Sweden defeated Canada on the final day to clinch a medal and claimed Silver when the Czechs lost to the Soviets in the final game. Canada claimed Bronze, losing out to Sweden on the head-to-head tie-breaker. The East Germans handily defeated the West this year, which was believed to have settled who would be relegated. However, starting in 1969, the top tier shrank to only six nations meaning that both German entries ended up being relegated. The tournament also featured an historic first, when Finland defeated Czechoslovakia.

In Group 'B' the championship was settled on the final day. With one game to play, both Romania and Poland had ten points, both had a goal differential of +14, and they had tied each other, so whoever won their final game by a wider margin would claim tournament victory. The Romanians defeated Yugoslavia five to three, and then had to watch as the Poles defeated Austria seven to two. The Polish team were quite fortunate that Romania had blown a lead on the second last day against Austria, but were very unfortunate that the change in the top tier format allowed for no promotion from Group 'B' Oddly, the leading scorer (Zoltán Horváth) came from the last placed team, Hungary. Japan won all four of their games by wide margins to claim Group 'C' but had to wait (like Poland) until 1969 for another chance to move up.

== World Championship Group A (Austria) ==
=== Final Round ===
| Pos | Team | Pld | W | D | L | GF | GA | GD | Pts |
|---|---|---|---|---|---|---|---|---|---|
| 1 | Soviet Union | 7 | 7 | 0 | 0 | 58 | 9 | +49 | 14 |
| 2 | Sweden | 7 | 4 | 1 | 2 | 31 | 22 | +9 | 9 |
| 3 | Canada | 7 | 4 | 1 | 2 | 28 | 15 | +13 | 9 |
| 4 | Czechoslovakia | 7 | 3 | 2 | 2 | 29 | 18 | +11 | 8 |
| 5 | United States | 7 | 3 | 1 | 3 | 20 | 23 | −3 | 7 |
| 6 | Finland | 7 | 2 | 1 | 4 | 14 | 24 | −10 | 5 |
| 7 | East Germany | 7 | 1 | 1 | 5 | 14 | 38 | −24 | 3 |
| 8 | West Germany | 7 | 0 | 1 | 6 | 11 | 56 | −45 | 1 |

Both East and West Germany were relegated as the top tier shrank to six nations for 1969.

| 18 March | Soviet Union | 8–2 | Finland |

| 18 March | Czechoslovakia | 6–2 | West Germany |

| 18 March | Sweden | 3–4 | United States |

| 18 March | Canada | 6–3 | East Germany |

| 19 March | Canada | 5–1 | Finland |

| 19 March | Soviet Union | 7–2 | United States |

| 20 March | Czechoslovakia | 6–0 | East Germany |

| 20 March | Sweden | 3–1 | West Germany |

| 21 March | Soviet Union | 12–0 | East Germany |

| 21 March | Finland | 1–5 | Sweden |

| 21 March | Canada | 13–1 | West Germany |

| 21 March | Czechoslovakia | 8–3 | United States |

| 23 March | Czechoslovakia | 1–3 | Finland |

| 23 March | East Germany | 2–8 | Sweden |

| 23 March | Soviet Union | 16–1 | West Germany |

| 23 March | United States | 1–2 | Canada |

| 25 March | East Germany | 0–0 | United States |

| 25 March | Finland | 2–2 | West Germany |

| 25 March | Soviet Union | 9–1 | Sweden |

| 25 March | Czechoslovakia | 1–1 | Canada |

| 26 March | United States | 2–0 | Finland |

| 26 March | East Germany | 8–1 | West Germany |

| 27 March | Czechoslovakia | 5–5 | Sweden |

| 27 March | Soviet Union | 2–1 | Canada |

| 28 March | East Germany | 1–5 | Finland |

| 28 March | United States | 8–3 | West Germany |

| 29 March | Canada | 0–6 | Sweden |

| 29 March | Czechoslovakia | 2–4 | Soviet Union |

== World Championship Group B (Austria) ==
=== Final Round ===
| Pos | Team | Pld | W | D | L | GF | GA | GD | Pts |
|---|---|---|---|---|---|---|---|---|---|
| 9 | Poland | 7 | 5 | 2 | 0 | 32 | 13 | +19 | 12 |
| 10 | Romania | 7 | 5 | 2 | 0 | 34 | 18 | +16 | 12 |
| 11 | Norway | 7 | 5 | 0 | 2 | 35 | 21 | +14 | 10 |
| 12 | Yugoslavia | 7 | 2 | 3 | 2 | 29 | 31 | −2 | 7 |
| 13 | Italy | 7 | 2 | 1 | 4 | 23 | 31 | −8 | 5 |
| 14 | Austria | 7 | 2 | 1 | 4 | 23 | 34 | −11 | 5 |
| 15 | Switzerland | 7 | 1 | 1 | 5 | 22 | 37 | −15 | 3 |
| 16 | Hungary | 7 | 0 | 2 | 5 | 27 | 40 | −13 | 2 |

Both Switzerland and Hungary were relegated to the 'C' pool for 1969, additionally they missed qualifying for the 1968 Olympics. No one was promoted.

| 18 March | Hungary | 6–6 | Yugoslavia |

| 18 March | Norway | 1–3 | Poland |

| 18 March | Romania | 7–2 | Switzerland |

| 18 March | Austria | 2–4 | Italy |

| 20 March | Yugoslavia | 3–3 | Poland |

| 20 March | Italy | 2–7 | Romania |

| 20 March | Switzerland | 2–5 | Norway |

| 20 March | Austria | 5–4 | Hungary |

| 21 March | Hungary | 3–7 | Poland |

| 21 March | Austria | 3–8 | Yugoslavia |

| 21 March | Norway | 2–3 | Romania |

| 21 March | Switzerland | 5–7 | Italy |

| 23 March | Hungary | 2–5 | Romania |

| 23 March | Italy | 2–4 | Yugoslavia |

| 23 March | Poland | 7–1 | Switzerland |

| 23 March | Austria | 2–5 | Norway |

| 25 March | Italy | 4–4 | Hungary |

| 25 March | Romania | 3–3 | Poland |

| 25 March | Yugoslavia | 2–9 | Norway |

| 25 March | Austria | 5–2 | Switzerland |

| 27 March | Hungary | 5–6 | Norway |

| 27 March | Poland | 2–0 | Italy |

| 27 March | Switzerland | 3–3 | Yugoslavia |

| 27 March | Austria | 4–4 | Romania |

| 28 March | Norway | 7–4 | Italy |

| 28 March | Switzerland | 7–3 | Hungary |

| 28 March | Romania | 5–3 | Yugoslavia |

| 28 March | Austria | 2–7 | Poland |

== World Championship Group C (Austria) ==
=== Final Round ===
| Pos | Team | Pld | W | D | L | GF | GA | GD | Pts |
|---|---|---|---|---|---|---|---|---|---|
| 17 | Japan | 4 | 4 | 0 | 0 | 46 | 8 | +38 | 8 |
| 18 | Denmark | 4 | 2 | 0 | 2 | 18 | 23 | −5 | 4 |
| 19 | Bulgaria | 4 | 2 | 0 | 2 | 17 | 17 | 0 | 4 |
| 20 | France | 4 | 1 | 0 | 3 | 18 | 21 | −3 | 2 |
| 21 | Netherlands | 4 | 1 | 0 | 3 | 19 | 49 | −30 | 2 |

With the top level shrinking, no one was promoted but Japan earned a trip to the Grenoble Olympics. Belgium, Great Britain, and North Korea were expected to play in this tournament, but did not participate.

| 19 March | Bulgaria | 10–3 | Netherlands |

| 19 March | Japan | 11–2 | Denmark |

| 20 March | Bulgaria | 3–2 | France |

| 22 March | Japan | 8–2 | Bulgaria |

| 22 March | France | 12–6 | Netherlands |

| 23 March | Denmark | 5–2 | France |

| 26 March | Netherlands | 8–7 | Denmark |

| 26 March | Japan | 7–2 | France |

| 27 March | Denmark | 4–2 | Bulgaria |

| 28 March | Japan | 20–2 | Netherlands |

== Ranking and statistics ==
1967 IIHF World Championship winners

Soviet Union
7th title

=== Tournament Awards ===
- Best players selected by the directorate:
  - Best Goaltender: (United States) Carl Wetzel
  - Best Defenceman: (Soviet Union) Vitaly Davydov
  - Best Forward: (Soviet Union) Anatoli Firsov
- Media All-Star Team:
  - Goaltender: (United States) Carl Wetzel
  - Defence: (Canada) Carl Brewer, (Soviet Union) Alexander Ragulin
  - Forwards: (Soviet Union) Veniamin Alexandrov, (Soviet Union) Alexander Almetov, (Soviet Union) Anatoli Firsov

=== Final standings ===
The final standings of the tournament according to IIHF:

| 1st place, gold medalist(s) | Soviet Union |
| 2nd place, silver medalist(s) | Sweden |
| 3rd place, bronze medalist(s) | Canada |
| 4 | Czechoslovakia |
| 5 | United States |
| 6 | Finland |
| 7 | East Germany |
| 8 | West Germany |

=== European championships final standings ===
The final standings of the European championships according to IIHF:

| Gold medal | Soviet Union |
| Silver medal | Sweden |
| Bronze medal | Czechoslovakia |
| 4 | Finland |
| 5 | East Germany |
| 6 | West Germany |
