= Roger Olsson =

Swedish ice hockey player

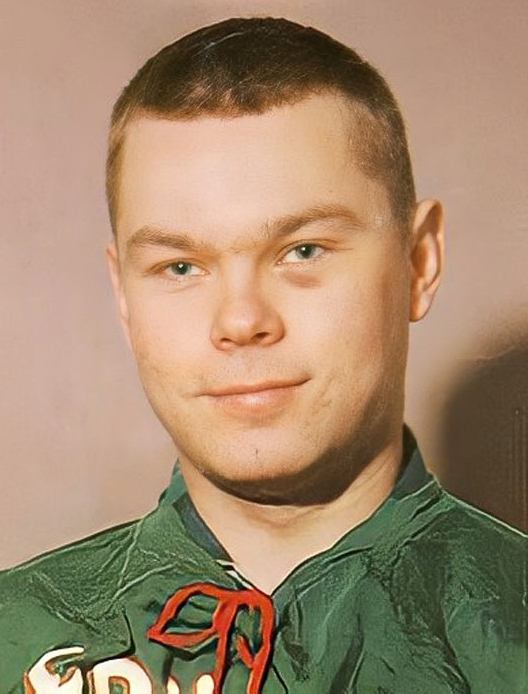
- Born: 30 January 1944 Västerås, Sweden
- Died: 4 July 2024 (aged 80)
- Height: 6 ft 1 in (185 cm)
- Weight: 185 lb (84 kg; 13 st 3 lb)
- Position: Center
- Shot: Left
- Played for: VIK Västerås HK; Frölunda HC
- National team: Sweden
- Playing career: 1960–1979

Roger Olsson (30 January 1944 – 4 July 2024) was a Swedish ice hockey center and Olympian. Olsson played all seven matches with Team Sweden at the 1968 Winter Olympics and scored one goal. He previously played for VIK Västerås HK and Frölunda HC in the Swedish Elite League.
