= Kjell-Rune Milton =

Swedish ice hockey player (1948–2023)

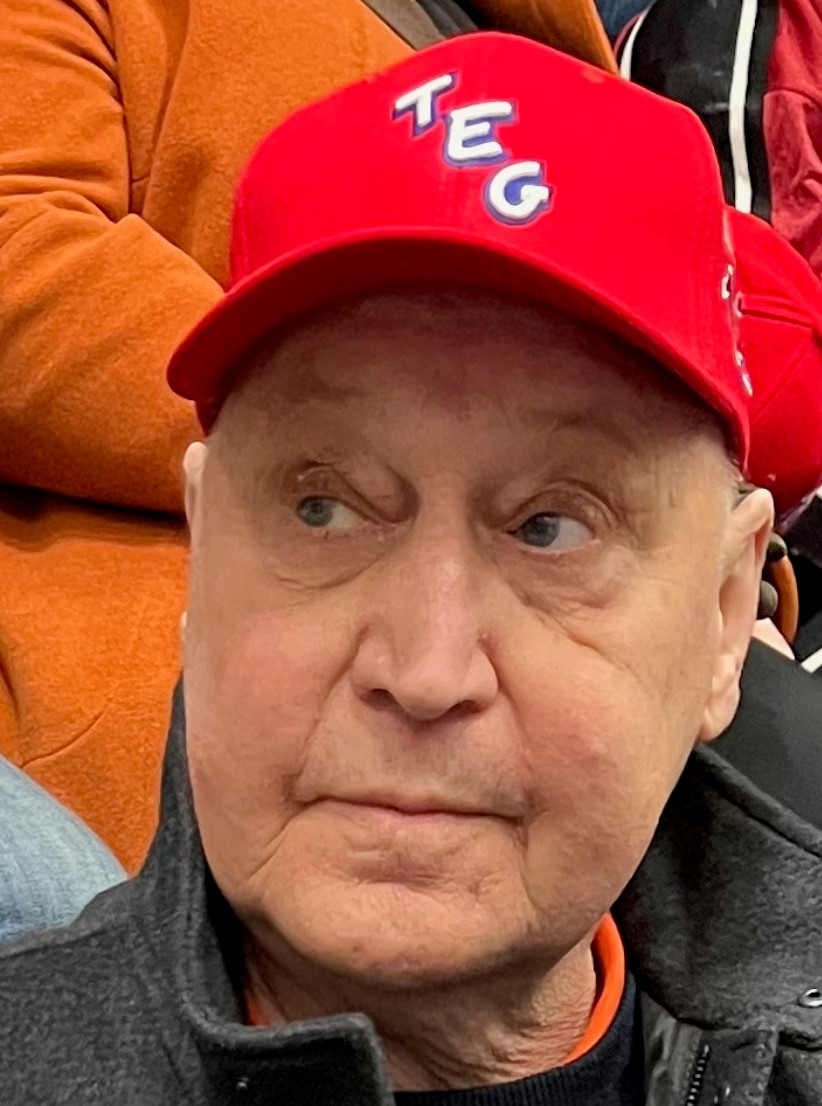
- Milton in 2022
- Born: 28 May 1948 Umeå, Sweden
- Died: 6 September 2023 (aged 75)
- Height: 5 ft 11 in (180 cm)
- Weight: 183 lb (83 kg; 13 st 1 lb)
- Position: Defence
- Shot: Left
- Played for: Modo Hockey; Frölunda HC; Modo Hockey; Kölner Haie
- National team: Sweden
- NHL draft: Undrafted
- Playing career: 1965–1987

Kjell-Rune "Mille" Milton (26 May 1948 – 6 September 2023) was a Swedish professional ice hockey defenceman.

Milton competed as a member of the Sweden national team at the 1972 Winter Olympics held in Japan.

Milton died on 6 September 2023, at the age of 75.
