= 1970 Ice Hockey World Championships =

1970 edition of the IIHF World Ice Hockey Championship

Tournament details
- Host country: Sweden
- Venue: 1 (in 1 host city)
- Dates: 14–30 March
- Teams: 6

Final positions
- Champions: Soviet Union (10th title)
- Runners-up: Sweden
- Third place: Czechoslovakia
- Fourth place: Finland

Tournament statistics
- Games played: 30
- Goals scored: 222 (7.4 per game)
- Attendance: 154,485 (5,150 per game)
- Scoring leader: (Soviet Union) Alexander Maltsev 21 points

The 1970 Ice Hockey World Championships was the 37th edition of the Ice Hockey World Championships. 21 nations participated in three different divisions or pools:

Pool A in Stockholm, Sweden, 14–30 March 1970
Pool B in Bucharest, Romania, 24 February – 5 March 1970
Pool C in Galaţi, Romania, 13–22 February 1970

For the eighth straight year, the Soviet Union won the world championship. Originally the tournament was scheduled to be held in Montreal and Winnipeg in Canada. However, after a dispute over allowing professional players in international tournaments, the IIHF awarded the championships to other cities. The Canadian team withdrew from competing in international hockey. They would not return to international play until 1977. This tournament was also the first one to make helmets mandatory for all skaters.

== Canadian departure from international hockey ==
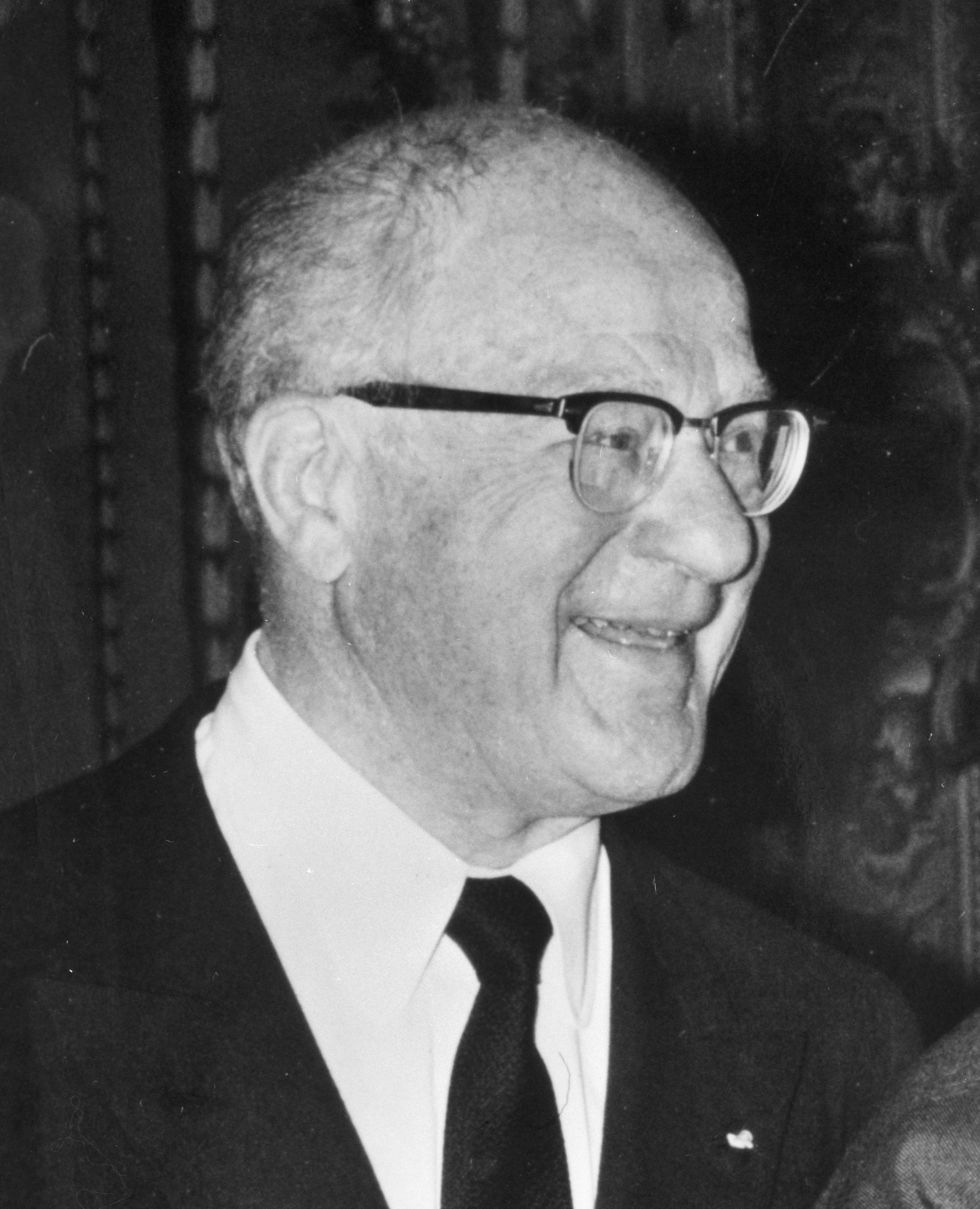
International Olympic Committee president Avery Brundage

Canada was scheduled to be the original host nation of Group A for the 1970 Ice Hockey World Championships, and the International Ice Hockey Federation (IIHF) had granted use of up to nine former professional players for national teams at the event. The Canada men's national ice hockey team had not won the Ice Hockey World Championships since 1961 and had never hosted the event. Hockey Canada and the Canadian Amateur Hockey Association (CAHA) saw the use of professionals as the best chance to return Canada to hockey supremacy, and were committed to event including professionals. Canadian officials were frustrated that their best players, competing in the National Hockey League (NHL), were prevented from playing while Soviet players, who were "employees" of the industrial or military organizations that fielded "amateur" teams, were allowed to compete.

International Olympic Committee president Avery Brundage objected to the use of professionals at the World Championships and stated that any national team which played against professionals would be ineligible for ice hockey at the 1972 Winter Olympics. The IIHF called an emergency meeting for January 1970 to discuss the situation. CAHA president Earl Dawson argued that national teams participating in Izvestia Trophy tournaments had played against professionals, but were still eligible for the Olympics and the same should apply to the World Championships. He also made the suggestion to consider the 1970 event an invitational tournament instead of a World Championships to avoid the wrath of the IOC, but the IIHF declined the notion. A vote was taken and five of the eight nations in the top division of the World Championships voted against the use of any professionals.

Canada perceived the situation to be a double standard in international hockey since players on European national teams were believed to be state-sponsored professionals labeled as amateurs. Dawson and the CAHA took stand against what they perceived as hypocrisy by European members of the IIHF. Dawson withdrew the Canadian national team from international competitions against European hockey teams until Canada was allowed to use its best players. Hosting of the 1970 World Championships was given to Sweden. Dawson felt that Sweden and the Soviet Union combined to sabotage the Canadian attempt to host the 1970 World Championships, because Sweden wanted to host the event and the Soviets did not want to lose the gold medal.

Instead of competing internationally at the Olympics, Canadian officials helped organize a series of games against the Soviet Union in September 1972 known as the Summit Series. These games featured a Canadian team made up exclusively of NHL professionals.

== World Championship Group A (Sweden) ==
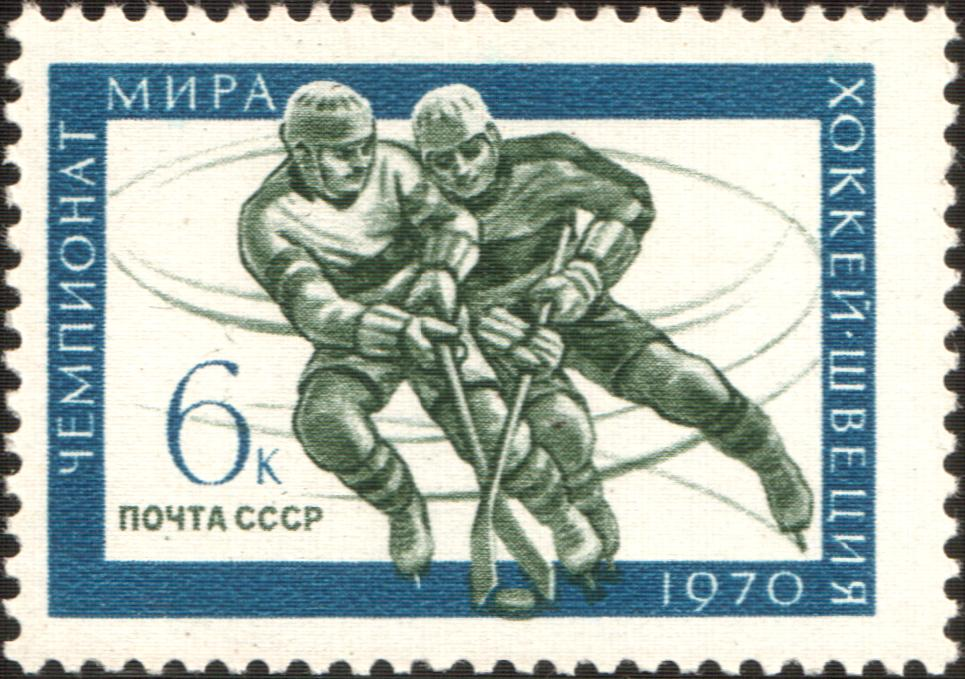
The Soviet 1970 World Championships stamp

Map of the 1970 World Championship

37.	World Championships	URS	SWE	TCH	FIN	GDR	POL	W	D	L	GF–GA	Pts.
1.	Soviet Union	***	2:4*	3:1*	2:1*	12:1*	7:0*	9	0	1	68:11	18
2.	Sweden	1:3	***	5:4*	1:3*	6:1*	11:0*	7	1	2	45:21	15
3.	Czechoslovakia	1:5	2:2	***	9:1*	4:1*	6:3*	5	1	4	47:30	11
4.	Finland	1:16	3:4	5:3	***	1:0*	9:1*	5	0	5	31:40	10
5.	East Germany	1:7	2:6	3:7	4:3	***	2:2*	2	1	7	20:50	5
6.	Poland	0:11	1:5	2:10	0:4	2:5	***	0	1	9	11:70	1

- Poland demoted to Pool B.

48.	European Championships
1.	Soviet Union
2.	Sweden
3.	Czechoslovakia
4.	Finland
5.	East Germany
6.	Poland

Czechoslovakia – Poland 6:3 (2:1, 3:1, 1:1)

14. March 1970 – Stockholm
Goalscorers:: Machač, Martinec, Suchý, Haas, Kochta, Nedomanský – Czachowski, Goralczyk, Kacik.

Soviet Union – Finland 2:1 (0:0, 0:0, 2:1)

14. March 1970 – Stockholm
Goalscorers:: Maltsev, Petrov - Leimu.

Sweden – East Germany 6:1 (1:0, 2:1, 3:0)

14. March 1970 – Stockholm
Goalscorers:: Stig-Göran Johansson 2, Svedberg, Sjöbrg, Stefan Karlsson, Wickberg – Bielas.

Finland – Poland 9:1 (2:1, 1:0, 6:0)

15. March 1970 – Stockholm
Goalscorers:: Leimu 3, Murto 2, Ketola, Jorma Peltonen, Mononen, Vehmanen – Goralczyk.

Soviet Union – East Germany 12:1 (3:0, 3:1, 6:0)

15. March 1970 – Stockholm
Goalscorers:: Maltsev 4, Mišakov 3, Firsov, Vikulov, Charlamov, Staršinov, Petrov – Joachim Ziesche.

Czechoslovakia – Sweden 4:5 (2:2, 1:1, 1:2)

15. March 1970 – Stockholm
Goalscorers:: Suchý 2, Machač, Kochta – N. Johansson, Abrahamsson, Nilsson, S. G. Johansson, Hedberg.
Referees: Sillankorva (FIN), Karandin (URS)

Finland – East Germany 1:0 (1:0, 0:0, 0:0)

16. March 1970 – Stockholm
Goalscorer: Jorma Peltonen.

Czechoslovakia – East Germany 4:1 (2:0, 0:0, 2:1)

17. March 1970 – Stockholm
Goalscorers:: Haas 2, Nedomanský, Suchý – Karrenbauer.

Soviet Union – Poland 7:0 (2:0, 5:0, 0:0)

17. March 1970 – Stockholm
Goalscorers:: Vikulov 3, Maltsev 2, Michajlov, Firsov.

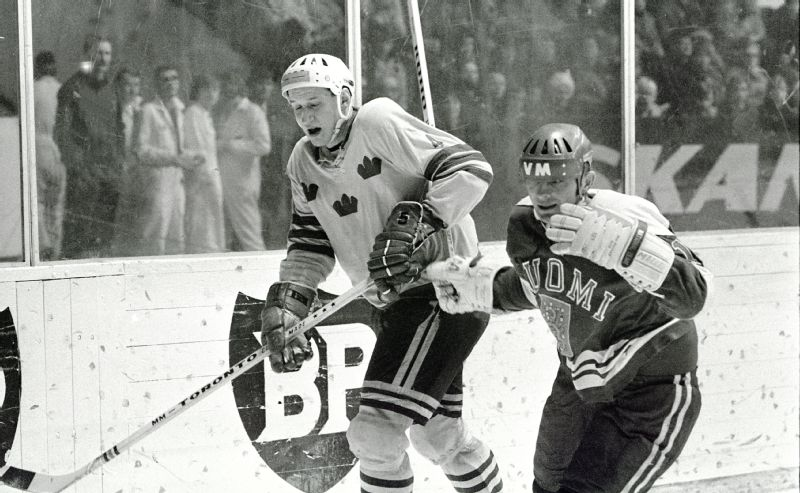
Lennart Svedberg - Matti Keinonen

Sweden – Finland 1:3 (0:2, 1:1, 0:0)

17. March 1970 – Stockholm
Goalscorers:: Stefan Karlsson – Linnonmaa, Rantasila, Keinonen.

Czechoslovakia – Soviet Union 1:3 (0:1, 1:0, 0:2)

18. March 1970 – Stockholm
Goalscorers:: Kochta – Maltsev, Vikulov, Nikitin.
Referees: Dahlberg (SWE), Sillankorva (FIN)

Sweden – Poland 11:0 (4:0, 2:0, 5:0)

19. March 1970 – Stockholm
Goalscorers:: Hans Lindberg 3, Palmqvist 2, Tord Lundström 2, Abrahamsson, Stefan Karlsson, Sterner, Lars-Göran Nilsson.

Czechoslovakia – Finland 9:1 (1:0, 5:1, 3:0)

20. March 1970 – Stockholm
Goalscorers:: Suchý 3, Nedomanský 3, Ševčík, Jar. Holík, Haas – Keinonen.

Sweden – Soviet Union 4:2 (1:1, 2:0, 1:1)

20. March 1970 – Stockholm
Goalscorers:: Arne Carlsson, Lundström, Palmqvist, Lars-Göran Nilsson - Charlamov, Staršinov.

East Germany – Poland 2:2 (1:0, 1:1, 0:1)

21. March 1970 – Stockholm
Goalscorers:: Helmut Novy, Noack - Migacz, Bialynicki.

Soviet Union – Finland 16:1 (5:0, 8:0, 3:1)

22. March 1970 – Stockholm
Goalscorers:: Michajlov 3, Charlamov 3, Maltsev 2, Alexandr Jakušev 2, Firsov 2, Petrov, Vikulov, Polupanov, Staršinov - Keinonen.

Czechoslovakia – Poland 10:2 (5:0, 2:2, 3:0)

22. March 1970 – Stockholm
Goalscorers:: Martinec 2, Jiří Holík 2, Nedomanský, Haas, Ševčík, Pospíšil, Suchý, Jar. Holík – Bialynicki 2.

Sweden - East Germany 6:2 (1:1, 3:1, 2:0)

23. March 1970 – Stockholm
Goalscorers:: Lars-Göran Nilsson 2, Stefan Karlsson, Lundström, Lindberg, Hedberg - Dietmar Peters, Plotka.

Soviet Union – East Germany 7:1 (4:0, 0:1, 3:0)

24. March 1970 – Stockholm
Goalscorers:: Michajlov, Charlamov, Firsov, Staršinov, Alexandr Jakušev, Mišakov 2 - Slapke.

Finland – Poland 4:0 (1:0, 2:0, 1:0)

24. March 1970 – Stockholm
Goalscorers:: Murto 2, Oksanen, Ketola.

Czechoslovakia – Sweden 2:2 (0:1, 1:0, 1:1)

24. March 1970 – Stockholm
Goalscorers:: Prýl, Hrbatý – Palmqvist, S. G. Johansson.
Referees: Karandin (URS), Wycisk (POL)

Czechoslovakia – East Germany 7:3 (3:0, 1:1, 3:2)

25. March 1970 – Stockholm
Goalscorers:: Nedomanský 3, Jiří Holík 2, Ševčík, Pospíšil – Joachim Ziesche, Bielas, Fuchs.

Soviet Union – Poland 11:0 (3:0, 6:0, 2:0)

25. March 1970 – Stockholm
Goalscorers:: Maltsev 4, Michajlov 2, Polupanov 2, Charlamov, Mišakov, Šadrin.

Sweden – Finland 4:3 (1:0, 0:2, 3:1)

26. March 1970 – Stockholm
Goalscorers:: Stefan Karlsson 2, Wickberg, Stig-Göran Johansson - Linnonmaa, Leimu, Mononen.

Czechoslovakia – Soviet Union 1:5 (0:2, 0:2, 1:1)

27. March 1970 – Stockholm
Goalscorers:: Hrbatý – Vikulov 2, Staršinov, Petrov, Firsov.
Referees: Sillankorva (FIN), Wycisk (POL)

East Germany – Finland 4:3 (1:0, 0:3, 3:0)

28. March 1970 – Stockholm
Goalscorers:: Dietmar Peters, Prusa, Joachim Ziesche, Braun - Mononen, Oksanen, Ketola.

Sweden – Poland 5:1 (4:0, 1:0, 0:1)

28. March 1970 – Stockholm
Goalscorers:: Olsson 2, Abrahamsson, Wickberg, Lundström – Migacz.

East Germany – Poland 5:2 (1:1, 0:1, 4:0)

29. March 1970 – Stockholm
Goalscorers:: Prusa, Nickel, Plotka, Hiller 2 - Bialynicki, Goralczyk.

Czechoslovakia – Finland 3:5 (0:2, 2:2, 1:1)

30. March 1970 – Stockholm
Goalscorers:: Nedomanský, Ševčík, R. Farda – Keinonen, Ketola, Murto, Rantasila, Jorma Peltonen.

Sweden – Soviet Union 1:3 (0:0, 1:2, 0:1)

30. March 1970 – Stockholm
Goalscorers:: Wickberg - Vikulov, Petrov, Maltsev.

== Pool A Statistics and Team Line-Ups ==
	SCORING LEADERS	Goals	Assists	Points
1.	(Soviet Union) Alexander Maltsev	15	6	21
2.	(Czechoslovakia) Václav Nedomanský	10	7	17
3.	(Soviet Union) Anatoli Firsov	6	10	16
4.	(Czechoslovakia) Jan Suchý	8	7	15
5.	(Soviet Union) Vladimir Vikulov	10	4	14

Best Goaltender	(Finland) Urpo Ylönen
Best Defenceman	(Sweden) Lennart Svedberg
Best Forward	(Soviet Union) Alexander Maltsev

All Stars

Goaltender	(Soviet Union) Viktor Konovalenko
Defence	(Sweden) Lennart Svedberg
Defence	(Czechoslovakia) Jan Suchý
Left Wing	(Soviet Union) Anatoli Firsov
Centre	(Czechoslovakia) Václav Nedomanský
Right Wing	(Soviet Union) Alexander Maltsev

Team Rosters

1. (Soviet Union) USSR
Goaltenders: Viktor Konovalenko, Vladislav Treťjak.
Defencemen: Vitalij Davidov, Valerij Vasiljev, Alexander Ragulin, Vladimir Lutčenko, Igor Romiševskij, Jevgenij Paladjev, Valerij Nikitin.
Forwards: Boris Michajlov, Vladimir Petrov, Valerij Charlamov, Vladimir Vikulov, Viktor Populanov, Anatoli Firsov, Alexander Maltsev, Vjačeslav Staršinov, Jevgenij Mišakov, Alexandr Jakušev, Vladimir Šadrin, Vladimir Šapovalov.
Coaches: Arkadij Černyšev, Anatolij Tarasov.

2. (Sweden) SWEDEN
Goaltenders: Leif Holmqvist, Gunnar Bäckman.
Defencemen: Thommy Abrahamsson, Arne Carlsson, Anders Hagström, Nils Johansson, Kjell-Rune Milton, Lars-Erik Sjöberg, Lennart Svedberg.
Forwards: Anders Hedberg, Stig-Göran Johansson, Stefan Karlsson, Hans Lindberg, Tord Lundström, Lars-Göran Nilsson, Anders Nordin, Roger Olsson, Björn Palmqvist, Ulf Sterner, Håkan Wickberg.
Coach: Arne Strömberg.

3. (Czechoslovakia) CZECHOSLOVAKIA
Goaltenders: Vladimír Dzurilla, Miroslav Lacký.
Defencemen: Jan Suchý, Josef Horešovský, Oldřich Machač, František Pospíšil, Vladimír Bednář, Lubomír Ujváry.
Forwards: Vladimír Martinec, Richard Farda, Josef Černý, Jan Hrbatý, Jaroslav Holík, Jiří Holík, Július Haas, Václav Nedomanský, Jiří Kochta, František Ševčík, Ivan Hlinka, Stanislav Prýl.
Coaches: Jaroslav Pitner, Vladimír Kostka.

4. (Finland) FINLAND
Goaltenders: Urpo Ylönen, Jorma Valtonen.
Defencemen and Forwards: Seppo Lindström, Ilpo Koskela, Juha Rantasila, Heikki Riihiranta, Pekka Marjamäki, Lalli Partinen, Pekka Leimu, Jorma Peltonen, Lasse Oksanen, Jorma Vehmanen, Veli-Pekka Ketola, Matti Keinonen, Väinö Kalkka, Matti Murto, Esa Peltonen, Juhani Tamminen, Harri Linnonmaa, Lauri Mononen.
Coaches: Seppo Liitsola, Matias Helenius.

5. (East Germany) EAST GERMANY
Goaltenders: Claus Hirsche, Dieter Pürschel.
Defencemen and Forwards: Dietmar Peters, Frank Braun, Wolfgang Plotka, Peter Slapke, Bernd Karrenbauer, Dieter Dewitz, Rüdiger Noack, Hartmut Nickel, Joachim Ziesche, Wilfried Rohrbach, Rainer Patschinski, Bernd Hiller, Lothar Fuchs, Reinhard Karger, Dieter Röhl, Helmut Nowy, Rolf Bielas, Peter Prusa.
Coach: Rudi Schmiede.

6. (Poland) POLAND
Goaltenders: Walery Kosyl, Andrzej Tkacz.
Defencemen and Forwards: Andrzej Slowakiewicz, Ludwik Czachowski, Robert Goralczyk, Marian Feter, Walenty Zietara, J. Stefaniak, Tadeusz Kacik, M. Kajzerek, K. Bialynicki, Tadeusz Obloj, Wlodzimirz Komorski, Feliks Goralzcyk, Bogdan Migacz, J. Modzelewski, St. Szewczyk, Czyslaw Ruchala, Mieczyslaw Jaskierski, Tadeusz Malicki, Stanislaw Fryzlewicz.
Coach: A. Jegorov.

== World Championship Group B (Romania) ==
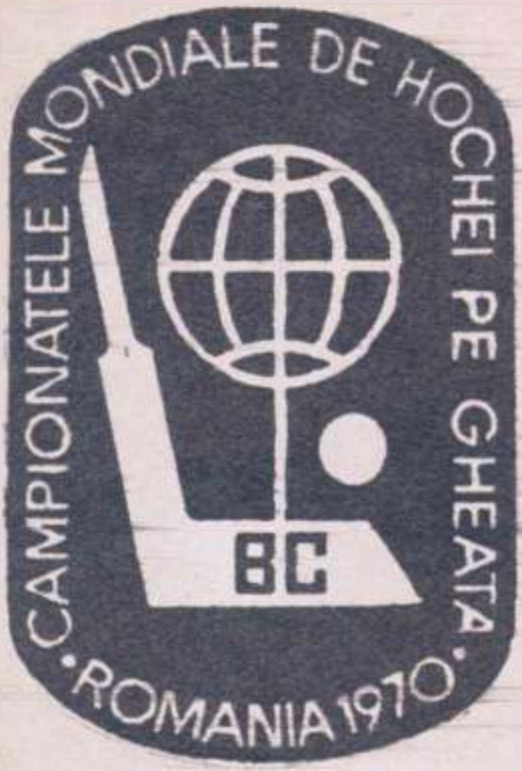

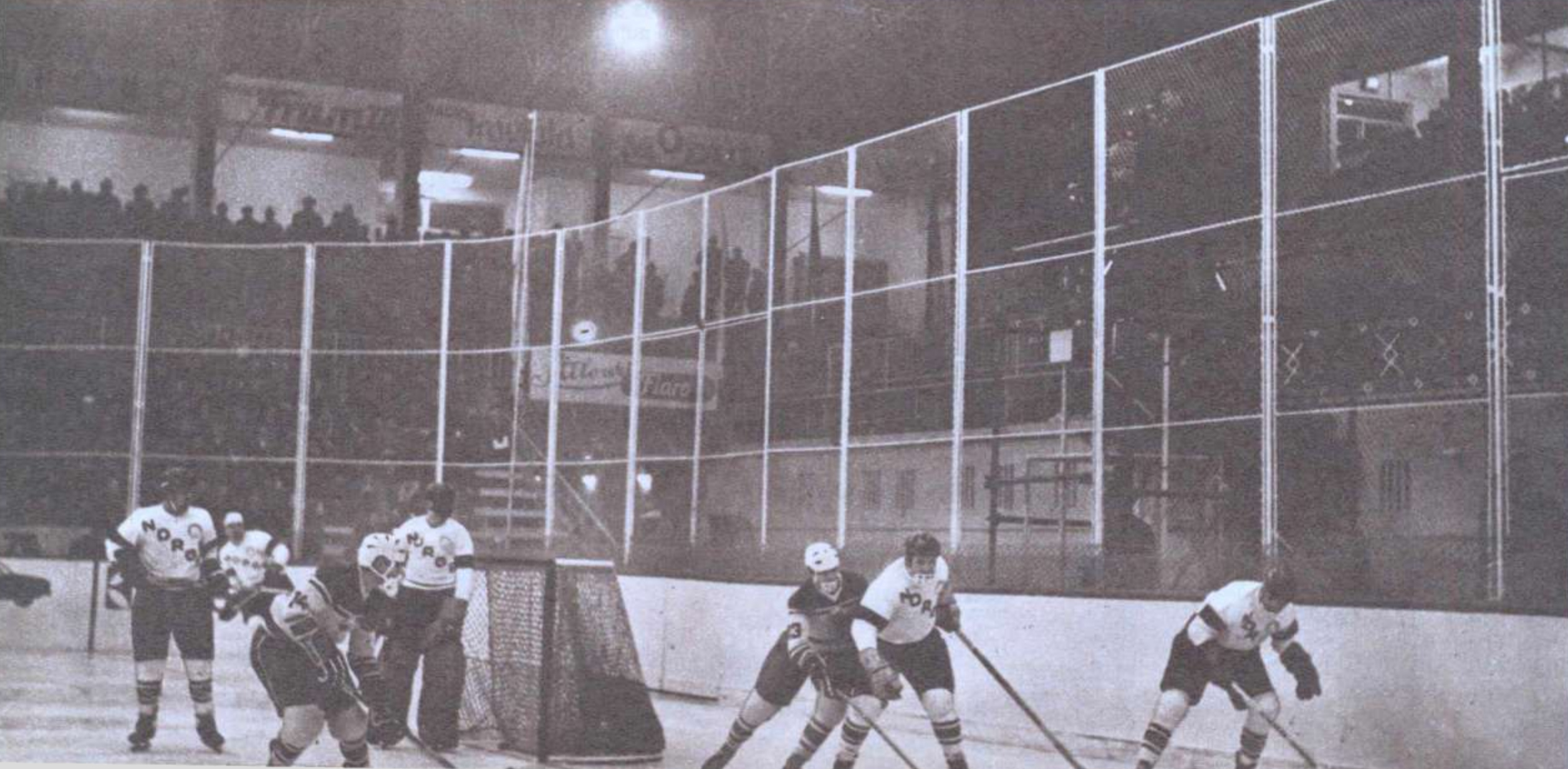
Romania - Norway

		USA	GER	NOR	YUG	JPN	SUI	ROM	BUL	W	D	L	GF–GA	Pts.
7.	United States	***	5:2	9:2	5:1	11:1	12:3	9:1	19:1	7	0	0	70:11	14
8.	West Germany	2:5	***	3:0	6:3	3:1	3:1	5:2	13:1	6	0	1	34:13	12
9.	Norway	2:9	0:3	***	3:3	5:5	4:2	4:3	8:3	3	2	2	26:28	8
10.	Yugoslavia	1:5	3:6	3:3	***	8:2	6:3	3:4	6:0	3	1	3	30:23	7
11.	Japan	1:11	1:2	5:5	2:8	***	3:2	8:4	11:2	3	1	3	31:34	7
12.	Switzerland	3:12	1:3	2:4	3:6	2:3	***	7:1	4:2	2	0	5	22:31	4
13.	Romania	1:9	2:5	3:4	4:3	4:8	1:7	***	6:2	2	0	5	21:38	4
14.	Bulgaria	1:19	1:13	3:8	0:6	2:11	2:4	2:6	***	0	0	7	11:67	0

- The USA was promoted to Pool A while Romania and Bulgaria were demoted to Pool C.

Pool B Winners:
United States

Carl Wetzel
Mike Curran
Gary Johnson

Charlie Brown
George Konik
Jim McElmury
Bruce Riutta
Don Ross

Herb Brooks
Gary Gambucci
Bryan Grand
Leonard Lilyholm
Henry Boucha
Bob Lindberg
Pete Markle
Keith Christiansen
Ozzie O'Neill
Craig Patrick
Larry Stordahl

Best Goaltender	(Germany) Anton Kehle
Best Defenceman	(United States) George Konik
Best Forward	(Japan) Takao Hikigi

All Stars

Goaltender	(Germany) Anton Kehle
Defence	(United States) Don Ross
Defence	(United States) George Konik
Left Wing	(Japan) Hideaki Kurokawa
Centre	(Germany) Ernst Köpf
Right Wing	(United States) Gary Gambucci

Yugoslavia – West Germany 3:6 (1:1, 1:2, 1:3)

24. February 1970 – Bucharest

United States – Japan 11:1 (4:1, 3:0, 4:0)

24. February 1970 – Bucharest

Switzerland - Bulgaria 4:2 (2:1, 1:0, 1:1)

24. February 1970 – Bucharest

Norway - Romania 4:3 (2:0, 2:0, 0:3)

24. February 1970 – Bucharest

United States - Bulgaria 19:1 (6:1, 7:0, 6:0)

25. February 1970 – Bucharest

West Germany – Japan 2:1 (1:0, 0:0, 1:1)

25. February 1970 – Bucharest

Norway – Switzerland 4:2 (2:1, 1:1, 1:0)

26. February 1970 – Bucharest

Yugoslavia – Romania 3:4 (0:0, 1:1, 2:3)

26. February 1970 – Bucharest

Norway – Bulgaria 8:3 (4:0, 2:2, 2:1)

27. February 1970 – Bucharest

United States – Yugoslavia 5:1 (2:0, 1:1, 2:0)

27. February 1970 – Bucharest

West Germany – Switzerland 3:1 (0:0, 3:0, 0:1)

27. February 1970 – Bucharest

Romania – Japan 4:8 (0:2, 4:1, 0:5)

27. February 1970 – Bucharest

United States – West Germany 5:2 (0:1, 3:1, 2:0)

28. February 1970 – Bucharest

Japan – Bulgaria 11:2 (3:1, 4:1, 4:0)

28. February 1970 – Bucharest

Yugoslavia - Norway 3:3 (2:0, 0:1, 1:2)

1. March 1970 - Bucharest

Romania - Switzerland 1:7 (0:3, 0:1, 1:3)

1. March 1970 - Bucharest

West Germany - Bulgaria 13:1 (5:0, 7:0, 1:1)

2. March 1970 - Bucharest

Yugoslavia – Switzerland 6:3 (2:0, 2:2, 2:1)

2. March 1970 - Bucharest

Norway – Japan 5:5 (2:1, 1:1, 2:3)

2. March 1970 - Bucharest

United States – Romania 9:1 (4:1, 1:0, 4:0)

2. March 1970 – Bucharest

United States – Norway 9:2 (4:0, 2:1, 3:1)

4. March 1970 – Bucharest

Yugoslavia – Bulgaria 6:0 (1:0, 5:0, 0:0)

4. March 1970 – Bucharest

Japan – Switzerland 3:2 (2:0, 0:2, 1:0)

4. March 1970 – Bucharest

West Germany – Romania 5:2 (0:1, 1:0, 4:1)

4. March 1970 – Bucharest

Yugoslavia – Japan 8:2 (6:1, 2:0, 0:1)

5. March 1970 – Bucharest

United States – Switzerland 12:3 (2:1, 6:1, 4:1)

5. March 1970 – Bucharest

West Germany – Norway 3:0 (0:0, 3:0, 0:0)

5. March 1970 – Bucharest

Romania – Bulgaria 6:2 (2:0, 2:0, 2:2)

5. March 1970 – Bucharest

== World Championship Group C (Romania) ==
		AUT	ITA	FRA	HUN	DEN	NED	BEL	W	D	L	GF–GA	Pts.
15.	Austria	***	3:3	7:2	3:2	4:3	9:2	11:0	5	1	0	37:12	11
16.	Italy	3:3	***	4:1	3:6	3:1	6:1	8:2	4	1	1	27:14	9
17.	France	2:7	1:4	***	4:2	2:0	9:0	11:0	4	0	2	29:15	8
18.	Hungary	2:3	6:3	2:4	***	6:2	7:1	15:2	4	0	2	38:15	8
19.	Denmark	3:4	1:3	0:2	2:6	***	3:3	11:4	1	1	4	20:22	3
20.	Netherlands	2:9	1:6	2:9	1:7	3:3	***	7:1	1	1	4	16:35	3
21.	Belgium	0:11	2:8	0:11	2:15	4:11	1:7	***	0	0	6	9:63	0

- Austria and Italy promoted to Pool-B tournament.

Italy – Denmark 3:1 (0:0, 0:0, 3:1)

13. February 1970 – Galati

Austria – France 7:2 (1:0, 2:2, 4:0)

13. February 1970 – Galati

Hungary – Netherlands 7:1 (1:1, 3:0, 3:0)

13. February 1970 – Galati

Netherlands – France 2:9 (0:6, 0:2, 2:1)

14. February 1970 – Galati

Italy – Belgium 8:2 (1:2, 5:0, 2:0)

14. February 1970 – Galati

Austria – Denmark 4:3 (2:3, 2:0, 0:0)

15. February 1970 – Galati

Netherlands – Belgium 7:1 (1:1, 4:0, 2:0)

16. February 1970 – Galati

Italy – France 4:1 (0:1, 2:0, 2:0)

16. February 1970 – Galati

Austria – Hungary 3:2 (3:1, 0:0, 0:1)

16. February 1970 – Galati

Austria – Belgium 11:0 (3:0, 3:0, 5:0)

18. February 1970 – Galati

Netherlands – Denmark 3:3 (0:0, 1:2, 2:1)

18. February 1970 – Galati

Italy – Hungary 3:6 (1:3, 0:1, 2:2)

18. February 1970 – Galati

Denmark – Belgium 11:4 (4:1, 2:1, 5:2)

19. February 1970 – Galati

Hungary – France 2:4 (0:2, 1:0, 1:2)

19. February 1970 – Galati

Italy – Netherlands 6:1 (3:0, 2:1, 1:0)

19. February 1970 – Galati

Austria – Netherlands 9:2 (3:1, 4:0, 2:1)

21. February 1970 – Galati

Hungary – Belgium 15:2 (5:1, 3:0, 7:1)

21. February 1970 – Galati

Denmark – France 0:2 (0:0, 0:1, 0:1)

21. February 1970 – Galati

France – Belgium 11:0 (4:0, 2:0, 5:0)

22. February 1970 – Galati

Hungary – Denmark 6:2 (4:2, 1:0, 1:0)

22. February 1970 – Galati

Austria – Italy 3:3 (2:3, 0:0, 1:0)

22. February 1970 – Galati

== Ranking and statistics ==
1970 IIHF World Championship winners

Soviet Union
10th title

=== Tournament Awards ===
- Best players selected by the directorate:
  - Best Goaltender: (Finland) Urpo Ylönen
  - Best Defenceman: (Sweden) Lennart Svedberg
  - Best Forward: (Soviet Union) Alexander Maltsev
- Media All-Star Team:
  - Goaltender: (Soviet Union) Viktor Konovalenko
  - Defence: (Czechoslovakia) Jan Suchý, (Sweden) Lennart Svedberg
  - Forwards: (Soviet Union) Anatoli Firsov, (Soviet Union) Alexander Maltsev, (Czechoslovakia) Václav Nedomanský

=== Final standings ===
The final standings of the tournament according to IIHF:

Gold medal	Soviet Union
Silver medal	Sweden
Bronze medal	Czechoslovakia
4	Finland
5	East Germany
6	Poland

=== European championships final standings ===
The final standings of the European championships according to IIHF:

Gold medal	Soviet Union
Silver medal	Sweden
Bronze medal	Czechoslovakia
4	Finland
5	East Germany
6	Poland

== Bibliography ==
- Oliver, Greg (2017). Father Bauer and the Great Experiment: The Genesis of Canadian Olympic Hockey. Toronto, Ontario: ECW Press. ISBN 978-1-77041-249-1.
- McKinley, Michael (2014). It's Our Game: Celebrating 100 Years Of Hockey Canada. Toronto, Ontario: Viking Press. ISBN 978-0-670-06817-3.
- Summary (in french)
- Duplacey, James (1998). Total Hockey: The official encyclopedia of the National Hockey League. Total Sports. pp. 498–528. ISBN 0-8362-7114-9.
- Podnieks, Andrew (2010). IIHF Media Guide & Record Book 2011. Moydart Press. pp. 141–2.
- Szemberg, Szymon; Podnieks, Andrew, eds. (2007), World of Hockey: Celebrating a Century of the IIHF, Bolton, Ontario: Fenn Publishing, ISBN 978-1-55168-307-2
