= Soviet Union at the 1980 Winter Olympics =

- Flag of the Soviet Union
- IOC code: URS
- NOC: Soviet Olympic Committee

in Lake Placid
- Competitors: 86 (63 men, 23 women) in 9 sports
- Flag bearer: Alexander Tikhonov (biathlon)
- Medals Ranked 1st: Gold 10 Silver 6 Bronze 6 Total 22

Winter Olympics appearances (overview)
- 1956; 1960; 1964; 1968; 1972; 1976; 1980; 1984; 1988

Other related appearances
- Latvia (1924–1936, 1992–); Estonia (1928–1936, 1992–); Lithuania (1928, 1992–); Unified Team (1992); Armenia (1994–); Belarus (1994–); Georgia (1994–); Kazakhstan (1994–); Kyrgyzstan (1994–); Moldova (1994–); Russia (1994–2014); Ukraine (1994–); Uzbekistan (1994–); Azerbaijan (1998–); Tajikistan (2002–); Olympic Athletes from Russia (2018); ROC (2022)

The Soviet Union (USSR) competed at the 1980 Winter Olympics in Lake Placid, United States.

== Medalists ==
Medal	Name	Sport	Event
Gold	Anatoly Alyabyev	Biathlon	Men's 20 km
Gold	Vladimir Alikin; Aleksandr Tikhonov; Vladimir Barnashov; Anatoly Alyabyev	Biathlon	Men's 4 x 7.5 km relay
Gold	Nikolay Zimyatov	Cross-country skiing	Men's 30 km
Gold	Nikolay Zimyatov	Cross-country skiing	Men's 50 km
Gold	Vasily Rochev; Nikolay Bazhukov; Yevgeny Belyayev; Nikolay Zimyatov	Cross-country skiing	Men's 4 × 10 km relay
Gold	Raisa Smetanina	Cross-country skiing	Women's 5 km
Gold	Irina Rodnina; Alexander Zaitsev	Figure skating	Pairs
Gold	Natalia Linichuk; Gennadi Karponossov	Figure skating	Ice dancing
Gold	Vera Zozuļa	Luge	Women's individual
Gold	Nataliya Petrusyova	Speed skating	Women's 1000m
Silver	Vladimir Alikin	Biathlon	Men's 10 km sprint
Silver	Vasily Rochev	Cross-country skiing	Men's 30 km
Silver	Nina Baldycheva-Fyodorova; Nina Rocheva; Galina Kulakova; Raisa Smetanina	Cross-country skiing	Women's 4 × 5 km relay
Silver	Marina Cherkasova; Sergei Shakhrai	Figure skating	Pairs
Silver	Soviet Union men's national ice hockey team: Vladimir Myshkin; Vladislav Tretiak; Viacheslav Fetisov; Vasily Pervukhin; Valery Vasiliev; Alexei Kasatonov; Sergei Starikov; Zinetula Bilyaletdinov; Vladimir Krutov; Alexander Maltsev; Yuri Lebedev; Boris Mikhailov; Vladimir Petrov; Valery Kharlamov; Helmut Balderis; Viktor Zhluktov; Aleksandr Golikov; Sergei Makarov; Vladimir Golikov; Aleksandr Skvortsov	Ice hockey	Men's competition
Silver	Yevgeny Kulikov	Speed skating	Men's 500m
Bronze	Anatoly Alyabyev	Biathlon	Men's 10 km sprint
Bronze	Aleksandr Zavyalov	Cross-country skiing	Men's 50 km
Bronze	Irina Moiseeva; Andrei Minenkov	Figure skating	Ice dancing
Bronze	Ingrīda Amantova	Luge	Women's individual
Bronze	Vladimir Lobanov	Speed skating	Men's 1000m
Bronze	Nataliya Petrusyova	Speed skating	Women's 500m

== Alpine skiing ==
Men

Athlete	Event	Race 1		Race 2		Total	
Athlete	Event	Time	Rank	Time	Rank	Time	Rank
Vladimir Makeev	Downhill					1:49.87	22
Valeri Tsyganov	Downhill					1:47.34	8
Vladimir Andreyev	Giant Slalom	1:22.19	21	1:22.75	11	2:44.94	15
Aleksandr Zhirov	Giant Slalom	1:21.53	10	1:22.54	9	2:44.07	9
Valeri Tsyganov	Giant Slalom	1:21.22	6	DNF	–	DNF	–
Aleksandr Zhirov	Slalom	DNF	–	–	–	DNF	–
Vladimir Andreyev	Slalom	54.97	10	51.68	9	1:46.65	9

Women

Athlete	Event	Race 1		Race 2		Total	
Athlete	Event	Time	Rank	Time	Rank	Time	Rank
Nadezhda Patrikeyeva	Giant Slalom	1:17.44	14	1:29.65	12	2:47.09	12
Nadezhda Patrikeyeva	Slalom	43.42	3	45.78	11	1:29.20	6

== Biathlon ==
Men

Event	Athlete	Misses ^{1}	Time	Rank
10 km Sprint	Aleksandr Tikhonov	2	34:14.88	9
10 km Sprint	Anatoly Alyabyev	1	33:09.16	3rd place, bronze medalist(s)
10 km Sprint	Vladimir Alikin	0	32:53.10	2nd place, silver medalist(s)

Event	Athlete	Time	Penalties	Adjusted time ^{2}	Rank
20 km	Vladimir Alikin	1'06:05.30	6	1'12:05.30	8
20 km	Vladimir Barnashov	1'07:49.49	4	1'11:49.49	7
20 km	Anatoly Alyabyev	1'08:16.31	0	1'08:16.31	1st place, gold medalist(s)

Men's 4 x 7.5 km relay

Athletes	Race		
Athletes	Misses ^{1}	Time	Rank
Vladimir Alikin; Aleksandr Tikhonov; Vladimir Barnashov; Anatoly Alyabyev	0	1'34:03.27	1st place, gold medalist(s)

== Cross-country skiing ==
Men

Event	Athlete	Race	
Event	Athlete	Time	Rank
15 km	Vasily Rochev	43:16.86	13
15 km	Aleksandr Zavyalov	43:00.81	7
15 km	Yevgeny Belyayev	42:46.02	5
15 km	Nikolay Zimyatov	42:33.96	4
30 km	Nikolay Bazhukov	1'31:06.28	14
30 km	Yevgeny Belyayev	1'30:35.32	11
30 km	Vasily Rochev	1'27:34.22	2nd place, silver medalist(s)
30 km	Nikolay Zimyatov	1'27:02.80	1st place, gold medalist(s)
50 km	Yevgeny Belyayev	2'31:21.19	6
50 km	Sergey Savelyev	2'31:15.82	5
50 km	Aleksandr Zavyalov	2'30:51.52	3rd place, bronze medalist(s)
50 km	Nikolay Zimyatov	2'27:24.60	1st place, gold medalist(s)

Men's 4 × 10 km relay

Athletes	Race	
Athletes	Time	Rank
Vasily Rochev; Nikolay Bazhukov; Yevgeny Belyayev; Nikolay Zimyatov	1'57:03.46	1st place, gold medalist(s)

Women

Event	Athlete	Race	
Event	Athlete	Time	Rank
5 km	Nina Rocheva	15:50.39	15
5 km	Galina Kulakova	15:29.58	6
5 km	Nina Baldycheva-Fyodorova	15:29.03	5
5 km	Raisa Smetanina	15:06.92	1st place, gold medalist(s)
10 km	Iraida Suslova	31:48.39	14
10 km	Nina Baldycheva-Fyodorova	31:22.93	6
10 km	Galina Kulakova	30:58.46	5
10 km	Raisa Smetanina	30:54.48	4

Women's 4 × 5 km relay

Athletes	Race	
Athletes	Time	Rank
Nina Baldycheva-Fyodorova; Nina Rocheva; Galina Kulakova; Raisa Smetanina	1'03:18.30	2nd place, silver medalist(s)

== Figure skating ==
Men

Athlete	CF	SP	FS	Points	Places	Rank
Vladimir Kovalev	5	DNF	–	–	DNF	–
Konstantin Kokora	10	11	10	168.18	91	10
Igor Bobrin	7	6	8	177.40	55	6

Women

Athlete	CF	SP	FS	Points	Places	Rank
Kira Ivanova	18	16	13	161.54	144	16

Pairs

Athletes	SP	FS	Points	Places	Rank
Marina Pestova; Stanislav Leonovich	3	4	141.14	31	4
Marina Cherkasova; Sergei Shakhrai	2	2	143.80	19	2nd place, silver medalist(s)
Irina Rodnina; Alexander Zaitsev	1	1	147.26	9	1st place, gold medalist(s)

Ice Dancing

Athletes	CD	FD	Points	Places	Rank
Natalia Bestemianova; Andrei Bukin	9	9	188.18	75	8
Irina Moiseeva; Andrei Minenkov	3	3	201.86	27	3rd place, bronze medalist(s)
Natalia Linichuk; Gennadi Karponossov	1	2	205.48	13	1st place, gold medalist(s)

== Ice hockey ==
=== First round ===
Team advanced to the Final Round
Team advanced to consolation round

Team	GP	W	L	T	GF	GA	Pts
Soviet Union	5	5	0	0	51	11	10
Finland	5	3	2	0	26	18	6
Canada	5	3	2	0	28	12	6
Poland	5	2	3	0	15	23	4
Netherlands	5	1	3	1	16	43	3
Japan	5	0	4	1	7	36	1

All times are local (UTC-5).

12 February 1980; 20:40	Japan	0 – 16 (0–8, 0–5, 0–3)	Soviet Union	Olympic Fieldhouse, Lake Placid

Referee:
Kompalla

0 – 1	03:42 - Starikov (Petrov, Mikhailov)
0 – 2	07:55 - Kharlamov (Mikhailov)
0 – 3	09:47 - A. Golikov (Makarov, Starikov)
0 – 4	12:19 - Fetisov (Petrov, Kharlamov)
0 – 5	14:59 - A. Golikov (Makarov)
0 – 6	17:30 - Balderis (Starikov, Zhluktov)
0 – 7	19:00 - V. Golikov (Makarov)
0 – 8	19:27 - V. Golikov (Fetisov, A. Golikov)
0 – 9	20:06 - Petrov (Kasatonov)
0 – 10	21:20 - Kasatonov (Mikhailov, Balderis)
0 – 11	24:20 - Makarov (V. Golikov, Vasiliev)
0 – 12	26:33 - Mikhailov (Starikov, Kharlamov)
0 – 13	38:06 - Fetisov (Mikhailov, Kharlamov)
0 – 14	46:26 - Zhluktov (Balderis, Skvortsov)
0 – 15	51:21 - Petrov (Pervukhin, Kharlamov)
0 – 16	54:49 - A. Golikov (Makarov, V. Golikov)

0 min
Penalties
2 min
17
Shots
67

14 February 1980; 16:30	Netherlands	4 – 17 (1–8, 1–7, 2–2)	Soviet Union	Olympic Arena, Lake Placid

Referee:
(Czechoslovakia) Vladimir Šubrt

	0 – 1	04:24 - Fetisov (Krutov, Maltsev)
	0 – 2	04:43 - Krutov (Lebedev, Kasatonov)
	0 – 3	09:59 - Vasiliev (Lebedev, Starikov) (SH)
	0 – 4	10:12 - Petrov (Pervukhin) (SH)
	0 – 5	11:43 - Kharlamov (Mikhailov, Pervukhin) (SH)
Hille (van Wieren, de Heer) (PP) - 11:51	1 – 5
	1 – 6	14:41 - Lebedev (Maltsev)
	1 – 7	16:41 - Maltsev (Zhluktov)
	1 – 8	22:02 - Lebedev (Fetisov, Maltsev)
	1 – 9	21:14 - Zhluktov (Bilyaletdinov)
	1 – 10	22:02 - Lebedev (Zhluktov, Skvortsov)
	1 – 11	24:32 - A. Golikov (V. Golikov)
	1 – 12	30:21 - A. Golikov
	1 – 13	31:07 - Krutov (Maltsev, Pervukhin)
	1 – 14	36:09 - Krutov (Lebedev, Kasatonov)
deGraauw (Klooster, de Cloe) - 33:49	2 – 14
	2 – 15	39:14 - Maltsev (Krutov)
de Cloe - 41:52	3 – 15
	3 – 16	47:12 - Makarov (V. Golikov, Starikov)
deGraauw (Klooster) - 56:14	4 – 16
	4 – 17	56:12 - Makarov (V. Golikov, A. Golikov)

14 min
Penalties
13 min
26
Shots
49

16 February 1980; 16:30	Soviet Union	8 – 1 (5–1, 1–0, 2–0)	Poland	Olympic Fieldhouse, Lake Placid

Referee:
Neagles

Skvortsov (Zhluktov) - 01:53	1 – 0
Balderis (Zhluktov, Skvortsov) - 10:27	2 – 0
Balderis (Zhluktov) - 10:36	3 – 0
Mikhailov (Fetisov, Kharlamov) - 13:37	4 – 0
	4 – 1	17:15 - Małysiak (Jobczyk) (PP)
Balderis (Pervukhin, Bilyaletdinov) - 23:12	5 – 1
Kharlamov - 25:19	6 – 1
Bilyaletdinov (Kharlamov) (PP) - 43:41	7 – 1
Maltsev (Fetisov) - 48:58	8 – 1

8 min
Penalties
6 min
60
Shots
19

18 February 1980; 17:00	Finland	2 – 4 (1–0, 0–1, 1–3)	Soviet Union	Olympic Fieldhouse, Lake Placid

Referee:
Haley

Porvari (Suoraniemi) - 17:44	1 – 0
	1 – 1	36:01 - Fetisov (Makarov, A. Golikov)
Porvari (SH) - 42:38	2 – 1
	2 – 2	54:59 - Krutov (Lebedev)
	2 – 3	56:07 - Maltsev (Krutov, Lebedev)
	2 – 4	56:18 - Mikhailov (Kasatonov)

14 min
Penalties
8 min
13
Shots
48

20 February 1980; 17:00	Soviet Union	6 – 4 (1–1, 1–2, 4–1)	Canada	Olympic Fieldhouse, Lake Placid

Referee:
Neagles

	0 – 1	01:35 - Nill (Davidson, G. Anderson)
Balderis (Skvortsov, Zhluktov) - 13:42	1 – 1
	1 – 2	20:19 - Gregg
	1 – 3	22:38 - Pirie (Zupancich, d'Alvise)
Kasatonov (Krutov) - 39:47	2 – 3
Mikhailov (A. Golikov) - 41:53	3 – 3
A. Golikov (Makarov) - 42:05	4 – 3
	4 – 4	43:05 - d'Alvise
Mikhailov (Starikov) - 48:41	5 – 4
A. Golikov - 56:51	6 – 4

6 min
Penalties
12 min
35
Shots
26

=== Final round ===
Team	GP	W	L	T	GF	GA	Pts
United States	3	2	0	1	10	7	5
Soviet Union (silver)	3	2	1	0	16	8	4
Sweden	3	0	1	2	7	14	2
Finland	3	0	2	1	7	11	1

22 February 1980; 17:00	United States	4 – 3 (2–2, 0–1, 2–0)	Soviet Union	Olympic Fieldhouse, Lake Placid

Referee:
(Finland) Karl-Gustav Kaisla

	0 – 1	09:12 - Krutov (Kasatonov)
Schneider (Pavelich) - 14:03	1 – 1
	1 – 2	17:34 - Makarov (A. Golikov)
Johnson (Christian, Silk) - 19:59	2 – 2
	2 – 3	22:18 - Maltsev (Krutov) (PP)
Johnson (Silk) (PP) - 48:39	3 – 3
Eruzione (Pavelich, Harrington) - 50:00	4 – 3

6 min
Penalties
6 min
16
Shots
39

24 February 1980; 14:30	Sweden	2 – 9 (0–4, 0–5, 2–0)	Soviet Union	Olympic Fieldhouse, Lake Placid

Referee:
Haley

	0 – 1	00:36 - Petrov (Kharlamov)
	0 – 2	05:52 - Makarov (A. Golikov)
	0 – 3	10:31 - Maltsev (Bilyaletdinov, Pervukhin)
	0 – 4	17:38 - Mikhailov (Kharlamov, Pervukhin)
	0 – 5	20:33 - Vasiliev
	0 – 6	27:18 - Krutov (Pervukhin)
	0 – 7	28:14 - Skvortsov (Balderis, Pervukhin)
	0 – 8	34:51 - Zhluktov (Balderis, Skvortsov)
	0 – 9	35:02 - Fetisov
Åhlberg (Weinstock, Holmgren) - 49:17	1 – 9
Holmgren (Näslund) - 54:21	2 – 9

8 min
Penalties
12 min
26
Shots
28

Carried over group match:

- Finland 2–4 USSR (Soviet Union)

Roster

- #1 Vladimir Myshkin G
- #20 Vladislav Tretiak G
- #2 Viacheslav Fetisov D
- #5 Vasily Pervukhin D
- #6 Valery Vasiliev D (A)
- #7 Alexei Kasatonov D
- #12 Sergei Starikov D
- #14 Zinetula Bilyaletdinov D
- #9 Vladimir Krutov F
- #10 Alexander Maltsev F
- #11 Yuri Lebedev F
- #13 Boris Mikhailov F (C)
- #16 Vladimir Petrov F
- #17 Valery Kharlamov F
- #19 Helmut Balderis F
- #22 Viktor Zhluktov F
- #23 Aleksandr Golikov F
- #24 Sergei Makarov F
- #25 Vladimir Golikov F
- #26 Aleksandr Skvortsov F

Coaches

- Head Coach - Victor Tikhonov

== Luge ==
Men

Athlete	Run 1		Run 2		Run 3		Run 4		Total	
Athlete	Time	Rank	Time	Rank	Time	Rank	Time	Rank	Time	Rank
Dainis Bremze	43.559	3	1:21.445	25	DNF	–	–	–	DNF	–

(Men's) doubles

Athletes	Run 1		Run 2		Total	
Athletes	Time	Rank	Time	Rank	Time	Rank
Dainis Bremze; Aigars Krikis	40.164	11	40.498	10	1:20.662	10
Valery Yakushin; Sergey Danilin	39.951	7	45.193	18	1:25.144	17

Women

Athlete	Run 1		Run 2		Run 3		Run 4		Total	
Athlete	Time	Rank	Time	Rank	Time	Rank	Time	Rank	Time	Rank
Astra Rībena	39.617	8	39.780	7	39.816	8	39.798	8	2:39.011	8
Ingrīda Amantova	39.346	3	39.488	3	39.610	5	39.373	4	2:37.817	3rd place, bronze medalist(s)
Vera Zozuļa	38.978	1	39.167	1	39.271	1	39.121	1	2:36.537	1st place, gold medalist(s)

== Nordic combined ==
Events:

- normal hill ski jumping (Three jumps, best two counted and shown here.)
- 15 km cross-country skiing

Athlete	Event	Ski Jumping				Cross-country			Total	
Athlete	Event	Distance 1	Distance 2	Points	Rank	Time	Points	Rank	Points	Rank
Fjodor Koltšin	Individual	70.0	70.0	171.0	26	48:08.8	216.355	3	387.355	15
Sergey Omelchenko	Individual	72.5	75.0	176.3	21	49:33.6	203.635	10	379.935	19
Aleksandr Mayorov	Individual	75.5	78.0	194.4	13	48:19.6	214.735	6	409.135	7

== Ski jumping ==
Athlete	Event	Jump 1		Jump 2		Total	
Athlete	Event	Distance	Points	Distance	Points	Points	Rank
Andrey Shakirov	Normal hill	61.0	72.8	63.5	74.3	147.1	46
Yury Ivanov	Normal hill	71.0	93.8	78.0	106.5	200.3	33
Vladimir Vlasov	Normal hill	80.0	109.2	71.5	95.6	204.8	31
Aleksey Borovitin	Normal hill	80.5	115.0	76.0	105.3	220.3	21
Aleksey Borovitin	Large hill	91.5	91.8	96.0	101.6	193.4	36
Andrey Shakirov	Large hill	96.5	99.3	90.0	87.7	187.0	39
Yury Ivanov	Large hill	97.0	103.5	92.0	93.5	197.0	34
Vladimir Vlasov	Large hill	97.0	103.5	96.5	101.8	205.3	28

== Speed skating ==
Men

Event	Athlete	Race	
Event	Athlete	Time	Rank
500 m	Sergey Khlebnikov	39.25	15
500 m	Anatoly Medennikov	38.88	7
500 m	Yevgeny Kulikov	38.37	2nd place, silver medalist(s)
1000 m	Anatoly Medennikov	1:18.92	15
1000 m	Sergey Khlebnikov	1:17.96	9
1000 m	Vladimir Lobanov	1:16.91	3rd place, bronze medalist(s)
1500 m	Yevgeny Solunsky	1:59.47	9
1500 m	Vladimir Lobanov	1:59.30	8
1500 m	Yury Kondakov	1:57.36	5
5000 m	Sergey Berezin	7:19.93	15
5000 m	Dmitry Ogloblin	7:16.92	13
5000 m	Viktor Lyoskin	7:16.24	11
10,000 m	Dmitry Ogloblin	15:20.14	16
10,000 m	Sergey Berezin	15:04.68	10
10,000 m	Viktor Lyoskin	14:51.72	7

Women

Event	Athlete	Race	
Event	Athlete	Time	Rank
500 m	Irina Kuleshova-Kovrova	43.50	10
500 m	Tatyana Tarasova	43.26	8
500 m	Nataliya Petrusyova	42.42	3rd place, bronze medalist(s)
1000 m	Irina Kuleshova-Kovrova	1:29.94	20
1000 m	Valentina Lalenkova	1:28.57	11
1000 m	Nataliya Petrusyova	1:24.50 OR	1st place, gold medalist(s)
1500 m	Vera Bryndzy	2:16.32	18
1500 m	Tatyana Averina-Barabash	2:16.32	18
1500 m	Nataliya Petrusyova	2:14.15	8
3000 m	Valentina Lalenkova	4:51.72	17
3000 m	Olga Pleshkova	4:43.11	9
3000 m	Nataliya Petrusyova	4:42.59	8

== Medals by republic ==
In the following table for team events number of team representatives, who received medals are counted, not "one medal for all the team", as usual. Because there were people from different republics in one team.

Rank	Nation	Gold	Silver	Bronze	Total
1	Russian SFSR	17	28	6	51
2	Latvian SSR	1	1	1	3
Totals (2 entries)		18	29	7	54
