= Miracle on Ice =

1980 Olympic ice hockey game

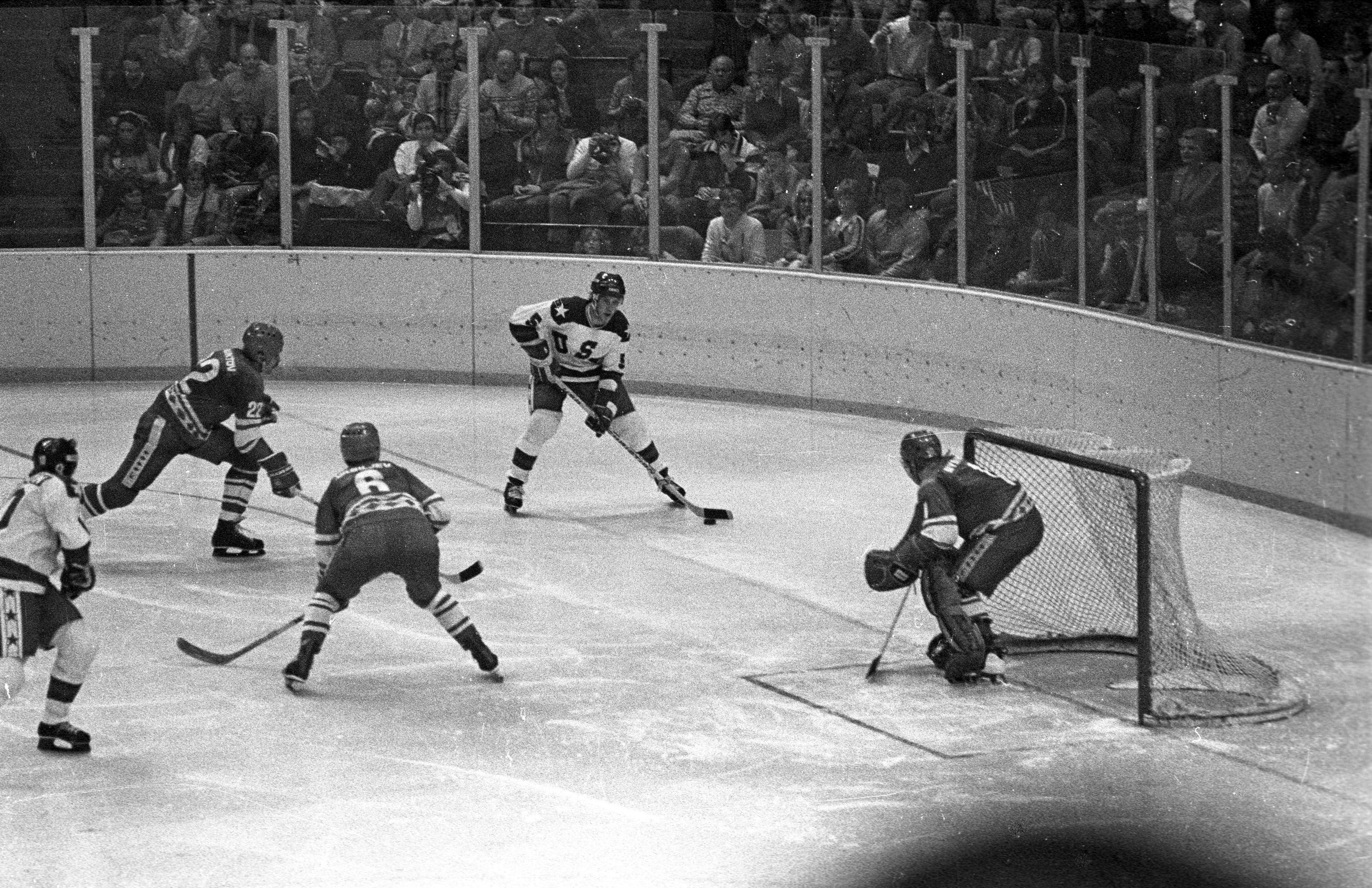
- United States against Soviet Union at the 1980 Winter Olympics
	1	2	3	Total
Soviet Union	2	1	0	3
United States	2	0	2	4
- Date: February 22, 1980
- Arena: Olympic Center
- City: Lake Placid, New York, U.S.
- Attendance: 8,500

The "Miracle on Ice" was an ice hockey game during the 1980 Winter Olympics in Lake Placid, New York. It was played between the hosting United States and the Soviet Union on February 22, 1980, during the medal round of the men's ice hockey tournament. Although the Soviet Union was a four-time defending gold medalist and heavily favored, the United States achieved an upset victory, winning 4–3. The Soviet Union had won the gold medal in five of the six previous Winter Olympic Games, and were the heavy favorite to win another gold in Lake Placid. Olympic rules at the time prohibited professional athletes from competing, but the Soviet government circumvented this by employing professional athletes in symbolic university or military positions, allowing them to focus full-time on sport. As a result, the Soviet team consisted of veteran players with significant experience in international play. By contrast, the United States team, led by head coach Herb Brooks, was composed mostly of amateur players; only four players had any experience beyond that level, and even then all four had only minimal, minor-league experience. In addition, the United States had the youngest team in the tournament and in U.S. national team history. In the group stage, both the Soviet and American teams were undefeated; the U.S. achieved several surprising results, including a 2–2 draw against Sweden, and a 7–3 upset victory over second-place favorite Czechoslovakia.

For the first game in the medal round, the Americans played the Soviets. Finishing the first period tied at 2–2, and the Soviets leading 3–2 following the second, the U.S. team scored two more goals to take their first lead midway in the third and final period, then held out to win by a score of 4–3. Two days later, the U.S. secured the gold medal by defeating Finland 4–2 in their final game, while the Soviet Union claimed the silver medal with a dominant 9–2 victory over Sweden. Mark Johnson, who led the Americans in scoring, was named tournament MVP. Defenseman Ken Morrow went on to win a Stanley Cup with the New York Islanders later that year, becoming the first player in NHL history to win a Stanley Cup and an Olympic gold medal in the same year.

The victory became one of the most iconic moments of the Games and in U.S. sports. Equally well-known was the television call of the final seconds of the game by Al Michaels for ABC, in which he declared: "Do you believe in miracles? Yes!" The team was honored as Sports Illustrated's Sportsmen of the Year and the Associated Press Athlete of the Year in 1980. In 1999, Sports Illustrated named the "Miracle on Ice" the top sports moment of the 20th century. As part of its centennial celebration in 2008, the International Ice Hockey Federation (IIHF) named the "Miracle on Ice" as the top international ice hockey story of the past 100 years. In 2025, the United States Congress recognized the members of the team with the Congressional Gold Medal.

== History ==
=== The Soviet and American teams ===
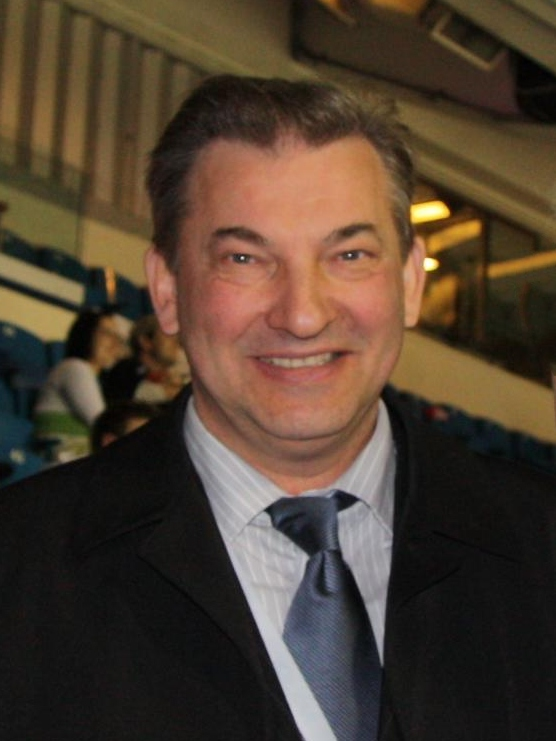
The Soviet team's Vladislav Tretiak (pictured here in 2008) was considered the world's best goaltender in ice hockey in 1980. The Americans scored two goals against him before he was pulled from the game by Viktor Tikhonov at the end of the first period.

The Soviet Union entered the Lake Placid games as the heavy favorite, having won four consecutive gold medals dating back to the 1964 games. In the four Olympics following their 1960 bronze-medal finish at Squaw Valley, Soviet teams had gone 27–1–1 (wins-losses-ties) and outscored their opponents 175–44. In head-to-head matchups against the United States, the cumulative score over that period was 28–7. The Soviet team had not lost a game in Olympic play since 1968.

The Soviets were led by legendary ice hockey players, such as Boris Mikhailov (a top line right winger and team captain), Vladislav Tretiak (the consensus best goaltender in the world at the time), the speedy and skilled Valeri Kharlamov, and dynamic players such as defenseman Viacheslav Fetisov and forwards Vladimir Krutov and Sergei Makarov. From that team, Tretiak, Kharlamov, Makarov, and Fetisov were eventually enshrined in the Hockey Hall of Fame. Many of the Soviet players had gained attention in the Summit Series eight years before and, in contrast to the American players, were de facto professionals with long histories of international play, employed by industrial firms or military organizations for the sole purpose of playing hockey on their organization's team. Western nations protested the Soviet Union's use of full-time athletes, as they were forced to use amateur (mainly college) players due to the International Olympic Committee's (IOC) amateur-only policy. The situation even led to Canadian withdrawal from the 1972 and 1976 Olympics, but the IOC did not change the rules until the late 1980s. U.S. head coach Herb Brooks held tryouts in Colorado Springs in the summer of 1979. Of the 20 players who eventually made the final Olympic roster, Buzz Schneider was the only one returning from the 1976 Olympic team. Nine players had played under Brooks at the University of Minnesota (including Rob McClanahan, Mike Ramsey, and Phil Verchota), while four more were from Boston University (Dave Silk, Jack O'Callahan, goaltender Jim Craig, and team captain Mike Eruzione). As Boston University and Minnesota were perennial rivals in college hockey (for instance, they had faced off in a bitter NCAA national semifinal in 1976), Brooks' selection process was a 300-question psychological test that would give him insight on how every player would react under stress; anyone who refused to take the test would automatically fail. Brooks had to select from 68 players who started the tryout. Brooks wanted to include Joe Mullen, a future three-time Stanley Cup winner and Hockey Hall of Fame inductee, on the team, but his father was ill, and Mullen instead signed a professional contract with the St. Louis Blues to support his family financially.

The average age of the U.S. team was 21 years, making it the youngest team in U.S. history to play in the Olympics (in addition to being the youngest team in the 1980 Olympic tournament), but Brooks knew the limits of every player. As forward John Harrington said, "He knew exactly where to quit. He'd push you right to the limit where you were ready to say, 'I've had it, I'm throwing it in' — and then he'd back off." Brooks continued the organization by campaigning for the players' selection of Eruzione as the captain, and Craig had been the goalie for him in the 1979 World Championship tournament. Assistant coach Craig Patrick had played with Brooks on the 1967 U.S. national team.

The Soviet and American teams were natural rivals due to the decades-old Cold War. In addition, U.S. President Jimmy Carter was considering boycotting the 1980 Summer Olympics, which were to be held in Moscow, in protest of the December 1979 Soviet invasion of Afghanistan. On February 9, the same day the American and Soviet teams met in an exhibition game in New York City, U.S. Secretary of State Cyrus Vance denounced the impending Moscow Games at an IOC meeting. President Carter eventually decided in favor of the boycott.

=== Exhibitions ===
In exhibitions that year, Soviet club teams went 5–3–1 against National Hockey League (NHL) teams and, a year earlier, the Soviet national team had defeated a team of NHL All-Stars two games to one (by scores of 2–4, 5–4, and 6–0) to win the Challenge Cup. In 1979–80, virtually all the top North American players were Canadians, although the number of U.S.-born professional players had been on the rise throughout the 1970s. The 1980 U.S. Olympic team featured several young players who were regarded as highly promising, and some had signed contracts to play in the NHL immediately after the tournament.

In September 1979, before the Olympics, the American team started exhibition play. They played a total of 61 games in five months against teams from Europe and the United States. Through these games, Brooks instilled a European style of play in his team, emphasizing wide-open play with sufficient body contact. He believed it would be the only way for the Americans to compete with the Soviets. From the start of the exhibition games, he conducted the team through skating wind sprints consisting of end line to blue line and back, then end line to red line and back, then end line to far blue line and back, and finally end line all the way down and back. Some of the players took to calling these "Herbies". On September 17, the team played to a 3–3 tie in Norway. Believing the team wasn't putting up sufficient effort, an angry Brooks had them skate Herbies after the game and, after a while, arena custodians turned the lights off and the Herbies continued in the dark. Brooks skated the team for over an hour. The two teams played again the next night, with the U.S. winning handily 9–0. Near the end of the exhibition season, Brooks, because of subpar play, threatened to cut Eruzione (the captain) from the team and replace Craig with Steve Janaszak as the starting goaltender, although he had supported them throughout.

In their last exhibition game, against the Soviets at Madison Square Garden on Saturday, February 9, the Americans were crushed 10–3. Soviet head coach Viktor Tikhonov later said that this victory "turned out to be a very big problem" by causing the Soviets to underestimate the American team. The game was also costly for the Americans off-ice, as defenseman Jack O'Callahan pulled a ligament in his knee; however, Brooks kept O'Callahan on the roster, which meant the U.S. was virtually playing with only 19 players throughout the tournament. O'Callahan eventually returned for the game against the Soviets, playing limited minutes.

=== Olympic group play ===
In Olympic group play, the Americans surprised many observers with their physical, cohesive play. In their first game, on February 12 against favored Sweden, Team USA earned a dramatic 2–2 draw by scoring with 27 seconds left after pulling goalie Jim Craig for an extra attacker. Then came a stunning 7–3 victory over Czechoslovakia, who were a favorite for the silver medal. With its two toughest games in the group phase out of the way, the U.S. team reeled off three more wins, beating Norway 5–1, Romania 7–2, and West Germany 4–2 to go 4–0–1 and advance to the medal round from its group, along with Sweden.

In the other group, the Soviets stormed through their opposition undefeated, often by grossly lopsided scores. They defeated Japan 16–0, the Netherlands 17–4, Poland 8–1, Finland 4–2, and Canada 6–4 to easily qualify for the next round, although both the Finns and the Canadians gave the Soviets tough games for two periods. In the end, the Soviet Union and Finland advanced from their group.

== Game summary ==
Prior to the Friday game, ABC requested that it be rescheduled from 5:00 p.m. to 8:00 p.m. EST, so that it could be broadcast live in primetime. However, the IIHF declined the request after the Soviets complained that it would cause the game to air at 4 a.m. Moscow Time, as opposed to 1 a.m. As a result, ABC decided not to broadcast the game live for the U.S. audience and tape delayed it for broadcast during its primetime block of Olympics coverage. Before the game aired, ABC's Olympics host Jim McKay stated that the game had already occurred, but that they had promised not to spoil its results. In order to accommodate coverage of the men's slalom competition in alpine skiing, portions of the game were also edited for time. ABC's 8 to 8:30 p.m. timeslot was instead devoted to the animated special The Pink Panther in: Olym-Pinks. To this day, some who watched the game on television in the United States still believe that it was live.

With a capacity of 8,500, the arena was packed. Before the game, Brooks read his players a statement he had written out on a piece of paper, telling them that "You were born to be a player. You were meant to be here. This moment is yours." Brooks believed they could win and later said, "The Russians were ready to cut their own throats. But we had to get to the point to be ready to pick up the knife and hand it to them. So the morning of the game I called the team together and told them, 'It's meant to be. This is your moment and it's going to happen.' It's kind of corny and I could see them thinking, 'Here goes Herb again....' But I believed it."

Brooks wanted his team to play short shifts lasting 40 seconds or less to stay energized by the third period. He instructed team physician George Nagobads to track ice time for the players, who later joked that he never saw the game since he was focused on his stopwatch.

=== First period ===
As in several previous games, the U.S. team fell behind early. Vladimir Krutov deflected a slap shot by Alexei Kasatonov past U.S. goaltender Jim Craig at the 9:12 mark to give the Soviets a 1–0 lead. At the 14:03 mark, Buzz Schneider scored for the United States on a 50-foot shot from the left board to tie the game. The Soviets struck again when Sergei Makarov scored with 17:34 gone. With his team down 2–1, Craig improved his play, turning away many Soviet shots before the U.S. team had another shot on goal.

In the waning seconds of the first period, Dave Christian fired a slap shot on Vladislav Tretiak from 100 feet (30 m) away. The Soviet goalie saved the shot but misplayed the rebound, which bounced out some 20 feet (6.1 m) in front of him. Mark Johnson sliced between the two defenders, found the loose puck, and fired it past a diving Tretiak to tie the score with one second left in the period. Confusion reigned immediately after as the game clock showed 0:00 since it could not be stopped in time after Johnson's goal. Referee Karl-Gustav Kaisla ruled that one second would be put back on the clock and the usual center ice faceoff would take place before the first intermission could begin. A lengthy delay followed as most of the Soviet team had already proceeded down the tunnel to their locker room. Eventually, three Soviet skaters along with backup goaltender Myshkin took the ice for the final faceoff. The first period ended with the game tied 2–2.

=== Second period ===
Tikhonov replaced Tretiak with backup goaltender Vladimir Myshkin immediately after Johnson's goal, a move that shocked players on both teams. Tikhonov later identified this as the "turning point of the game" and called it "the biggest mistake of my career". Years later, when Johnson asked Viacheslav Fetisov, now an NHL teammate, about the move, Fetisov responded with "Coach crazy." Myshkin allowed no goals in the second period. The Soviets dominated play in the second period, outshooting the Americans 12–2, but scored only once, on a power play goal by Aleksandr Maltsev 2:18 into play. After two periods the Soviet Union led, 3–2.

=== Third period ===
Vladimir Krutov was sent to the penalty box at the 6:47 mark of the third period for high-sticking. The Americans, who had managed only two shots on Myshkin in 27 minutes, had a power play and a rare offensive opportunity. Myshkin stopped a Mike Ramsey shot, then U.S. team captain Mike Eruzione fired a shot wide. Late in the power play, Dave Silk was advancing into the Soviet zone when Valeri Vasiliev knocked him to the ice. The puck slid to Mark Johnson. Johnson fired off a shot that went under Myshkin and into the net at the 8:39 mark, as the power play was ending, tying the game at 3. Only a couple of shifts later, Mark Pavelich passed to Eruzione, who was left undefended in the high slot. Eruzione, who had just come onto the ice, fired a shot past Myshkin, who was screened by Vasili Pervukhin. This goal gave Team USA a 4–3 lead, its first of the game, with exactly 10 minutes remaining to play.

In what many Americans considered "the longest 10 minutes of their lives", the Soviets, trailing for the first time in the game, attacked ferociously. Moments after Eruzione's goal, Maltsev fired a shot which ricocheted off the right goal post. As the minutes wound down, Brooks kept repeating to his players, "Play your game. Play your game." Instead of going into a defensive crouch, the United States continued to play offense, even getting off a few more shots on goal. The Soviets began to shoot wildly, and Sergei Starikov admitted that "we were panicking." As the clock ticked down below a minute, the Soviets got the puck back into the American zone, and Mikhailov passed to Vladimir Petrov, who shot wide. The Americans fully expected Tikhonov to pull the goalie in the waning seconds. To their surprise, Myshkin stayed in the game. Starikov later explained that "We never did six-on-five," not even in practice, because "Tikhonov just didn't believe in it." Craig kicked away a Petrov slap shot with 33 seconds left. Kharlamov fired the puck back in as the clock ticked below 20 seconds. A wild scramble for the puck ensued, ending when Johnson found it and passed it to Ken Morrow. As the U.S. team tried to clear the zone (move the puck over the blue line, which they did with seven seconds remaining), the crowd began to count down the seconds left.

Sportscaster Al Michaels, who was calling the game on ABC along with former Montreal Canadiens goaltender Ken Dryden, picked up on the countdown in his broadcast, and delivered his famous call:

"11 seconds, you've got 10 seconds, the countdown going on right now! Morrow, up to Silk! Five seconds left in the game! (Dryden: It's over!) Do you believe in miracles? YES!"

As his team ran all over the ice in celebration, Herb Brooks sprinted back to the locker room and cried. In the locker room afterwards, players spontaneously broke into a chorus of "God Bless America".

During the broadcast wrap-up after the game, ABC Olympic sports anchor Jim McKay compared the American victory over the Soviet professionals to a group of Canadian college football players defeating the Pittsburgh Steelers (the recent Super Bowl champions and at the height of their dynasty).

== Post-game standings ==
Team	Pld	W	L	D	GF	GA	GD	Pts
United States	2	1	0	1	6	5	+1	3
Soviet Union	2	1	1	0	7	6	+1	2
Sweden	2	0	0	2	5	5	0	2
Finland	2	0	1	1	5	7	−2	1

Updated to match(es) played on 22 February 1980. Source: HockeyCanada.ca

== American aftermath ==
=== Gold medal ===
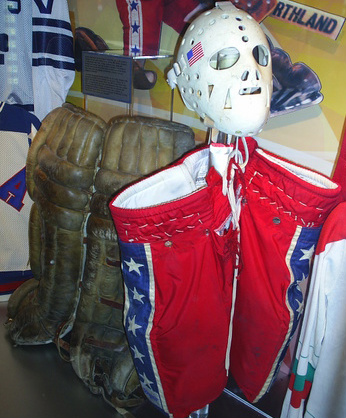
Jim Craig's gear from 1980, at the Hockey Hall of Fame

The United States did not win the gold medal by defeating the USSR. In 1980, the medal round was a round-robin, not a single elimination format as it is today. Under Olympic rules at the time, the group game with Sweden was counted along with the medal-round games versus the Soviet Union and Finland. Going into the final two medal-round games (U.S. versus Finland; USSR versus Sweden), it was mathematically possible for the United States to finish anywhere from first to fourth. A victory over Finland would secure the gold medal, while a tie would guarantee a podium finish for the Americans.

The March 3, 1980, cover of Sports Illustrated ran without any accompanying captions or headlines.

Two days later, on February 24, 1980, once again, Team USA faced a deficit, trailing 2–1 after the second period against Finland. According to Mike Eruzione, coming into the dressing room for the second intermission, Brooks turned to his players, looked at them, and said, "If you lose this game, you'll take it to your fucking graves." He then walked towards the locker room door, paused, looked over his shoulder, and said to them again, "Your fucking graves." Team USA scored three goals in the third period to defeat Finland 4–2.

At the time, the players ascended a podium to receive their medals and then lined up on the ice for the playing of the national anthem, as the podium was meant to accommodate only one person. Only the team captains remained on the podium for the duration. After the completion of the anthem, Eruzione motioned for his teammates to join him on the podium. Today, podiums are not used for ice hockey; the teams line up on their respective blue lines after the final game. After the gold medal-securing victory over Finland, the players received a congratulatory phone call from President Jimmy Carter.

The cover of the March 3, 1980, issue of Sports Illustrated was a photograph by Heinz Kluetmeier of the American players celebrating and waving an American flag; it did not feature any explanatory captions or headlines, because, as Kluetmeier put it, "It didn't need it. Everyone in America knew what happened." The U.S. team also received the magazine's "Sportsmen of the Year" award, and were also named Athlete of the Year by the Associated Press and ABC's Wide World of Sports. In 2004, ESPN, as part of its 25th anniversary, declared the Miracle on Ice to be the top sports headline moment and game of the period 1979–2004. The victory was voted the greatest sports moment of the 20th century by Sports Illustrated.

=== After the 1980 Winter Olympics ===
At the 1981 Canada Cup, the United States, with seven players from their 1980 Olympic team, again faced the Soviet Union. The Soviets took the opening round encounter 4–1 in Edmonton. At the 1982 World Championship in Finland, with Mike Ramsey, Mark Johnson, Buzz Schneider, and John Harrington, the Americans again met the Soviets, but once again the U.S. lost, 8–4.

=== Later careers ===
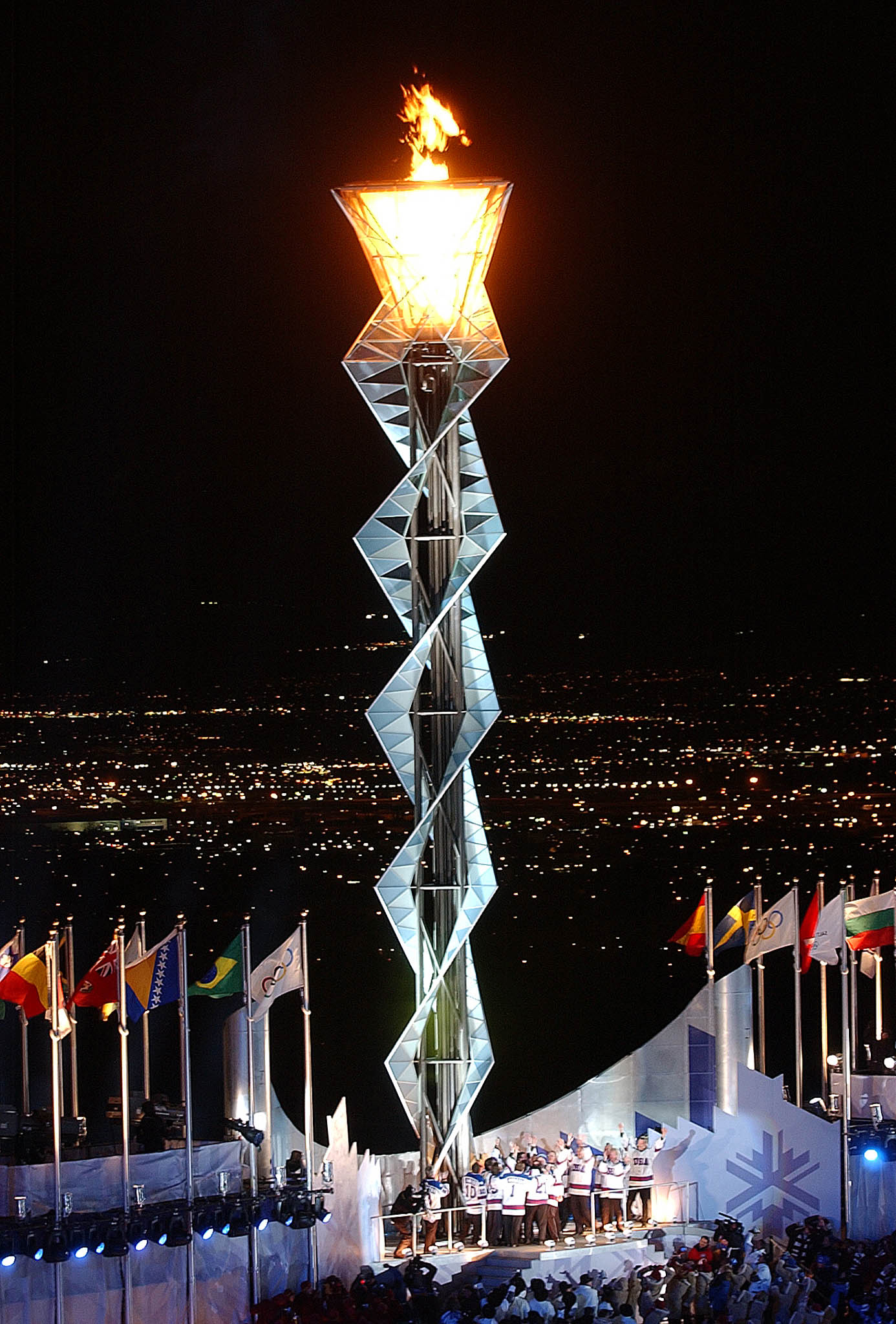
The U.S. team lit the Olympic cauldron during the opening ceremony of the 2002 Winter Olympics in Salt Lake City.

Of the 20 players on Team USA, 13 eventually played in the NHL. Five of them played over 500 NHL games, and three of them played over 1,000 NHL games.

- Neal Broten played one more season for the Golden Gophers before moving on to the NHL, and he appeared in 1,099 NHL games over 17 seasons—992 of them with the Minnesota North Stars/Dallas Stars franchise. He captained the Stars before being traded midway through the 1994–95 season to the New Jersey Devils. A two-time All-Star, he tallied 923 career points (289 goals, 634 assists), became the first American player to record 100 points in a season, and he won a Stanley Cup as a member of the Devils in 1995. Broten had already won the NCAA championship in 1979 at the University of Minnesota; this, combined with the Olympic gold medal in 1980 and the 1995 Cup win (Broten scored the Cup-winning goal in game four as Viacheslav Fetisov, playing for the opposing Detroit Red Wings, fell down), made him the first player in the history of the sport to win a championship at the collegiate, professional, and Olympic levels. The Dallas Stars have since retired number 7 for Broten.
- Ken Morrow won the Stanley Cup in 1980 as a member of the New York Islanders, becoming the first hockey player to win an Olympic gold medal and the Cup in the same year. He played 550 NHL games and won three more Cups, all with the Islanders. Morrow is currently working for the Islanders as Director of Pro Scouting.
- Mike Ramsey played in 1,070 games over 18 years. Fourteen of those years were spent with the Buffalo Sabres, with whom he played 911 games and was a five-time All-Star, captaining the team from 1990 to 1992. In 1995, he played in the Stanley Cup Final with the Detroit Red Wings, but his team was swept by Neal Broten and the New Jersey Devils. In 2000, Ramsey became an assistant coach for the Minnesota Wild.
- Dave Christian spent 14 years in the NHL, the bulk of them for the original Winnipeg Jets (for whom he served as team captain) and Washington Capitals. In 1990, he played in the Stanley Cup Final while with the Boston Bruins, but the Bruins lost in five games to the Edmonton Oilers. He ended his career with 783 points (340 goals, 443 assists) in 1,009 games and made the All-Star team in 1991.
- Mark Johnson played for several teams in the NHL before finding a home in New Jersey, tallying 508 career points (203 goals, 305 assists) in 669 games over 11 seasons. Like Christian, Ramsey, and Broten, he became an NHL All-Star (in 1984) and served as Hartford Whalers team captain. In 2002, Johnson became the coach of the University of Wisconsin–Madison women's team, leading the Badgers to National Championships in 2006, 2007 (which the Badgers won in the same Lake Placid arena in which the Miracle took place), 2009, 2011, 2019, 2021, 2023, and 2025. Johnson also served as head coach of the women's ice hockey team that won the silver medal at the 2010 Winter Olympics.
- Jack O'Callahan played 390 NHL regular season games between 1982 and 1989 for the Chicago Blackhawks and New Jersey Devils.
- Mark Pavelich played 355 NHL regular season games in the NHL for the New York Rangers, Minnesota North Stars, and San Jose Sharks between 1981 and 1992.
- Dave Silk played 249 NHL regular season games for the Boston Bruins, Winnipeg Jets, Detroit Red Wings, and New York Rangers between 1980 and 1985.

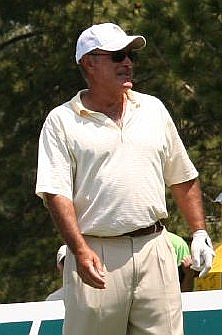
The Miracle on Ice brought fame to Al Michaels, and several players subsequently played in the NHL.

- Jim Craig appeared in 30 NHL games for the Atlanta Flames, Boston Bruins, and Minnesota North Stars between 1980 and 1984.
- Team captain Mike Eruzione did not play any high-level ice hockey after the 1980 Olympics, as he felt that he had accomplished all of his hockey goals with the gold medal win. He did work as a hockey television analyst in the 1980s and 1990s.
- Craig Patrick, Brooks' assistant coach and assistant general manager, both managed and coached the New York Rangers and Pittsburgh Penguins. As a result of his success with the Penguins, who won two Stanley Cups while Patrick was general manager, he was enshrined in the Hockey Hall of Fame in 2002. During that same year, he served as general manager of the Herb Brooks-coached 2002 U.S. hockey team that won the silver medal at the Salt Lake City games.
- Herb Brooks, the team coach, coached several NHL teams following the Olympics, with mixed results. He returned to the Olympics as coach of the French team in 1998, the first Olympics in which NHL players competed. Brooks then led Team USA to the silver medal in 2002, which included a 2–2 round-robin draw and a 3–2 semifinal victory over Russia (the successor to the Soviet Union), the semifinal coming 22 years to the day after the "Miracle on Ice" game. Brooks died in a car crash near Forest Lake, Minnesota on August 11, 2003, at the age of 66. In 2005, the Olympic Center ice arena in Lake Placid where the Miracle on Ice took place was renamed in his honor. The following year, Brooks was posthumously enshrined in the Hockey Hall of Fame.
- Al Michaels got the job as play-by-play announcer for ice hockey at Lake Placid because he was the only member of ABC's broadcasting team who had previously called the sport (at the 1972 Winter Olympics in Sapporo, Japan). Michaels was named "Sportscaster of the Year" in 1980 for his coverage of the event. Michaels spent 26 more years covering sports for ABC before moving to NBC to call Sunday Night Football alongside John Madden and then Cris Collinsworth after Madden retired.

== Soviet aftermath ==
=== Silver medal ===
In the Soviet locker room, Tikhonov singled out first-line players Tretiak, Kharlamov, Petrov, and Mikhailov, and told each of them, "This is your loss!" Two days after the Miracle on Ice, the Soviet team defeated Sweden 9–2, winning the silver medal. The Soviet players were so upset at their loss that they did not turn in their silver medals to get their names inscribed on them, as is customary. The result stunned the Soviet media who avoided covering the results of the ice hockey tournament. Instead, they focused on the Soviet Olympic team's overall performance, which brought them 10 gold medals and first place in the medal standings. Following the Olympics, General Secretary Leonid Brezhnev personally told Viktor Tikhonov that "I know you are stronger than the Americans" at a Kremlin reception for the Russian Olympians.

=== After the 1980 Winter Olympics ===
Despite the loss, the USSR remained the pre-eminent power in international ice hockey until its dissolution in 1991. The Soviet team did not lose a World Championship game until 1985 and did not lose to the United States again until 1991. Throughout the 1980s, NHL teams continued to draft Soviet players in hopes of enticing them to eventually play in North America. Soviet emigrant Victor Nechayev made a brief appearance with the Los Angeles Kings in the 1982–83 season, and during the 1988–89 season the Soviet Ice Hockey Federation agreed to let veteran Sergei Pryakhin join the Calgary Flames.

=== NHL careers ===
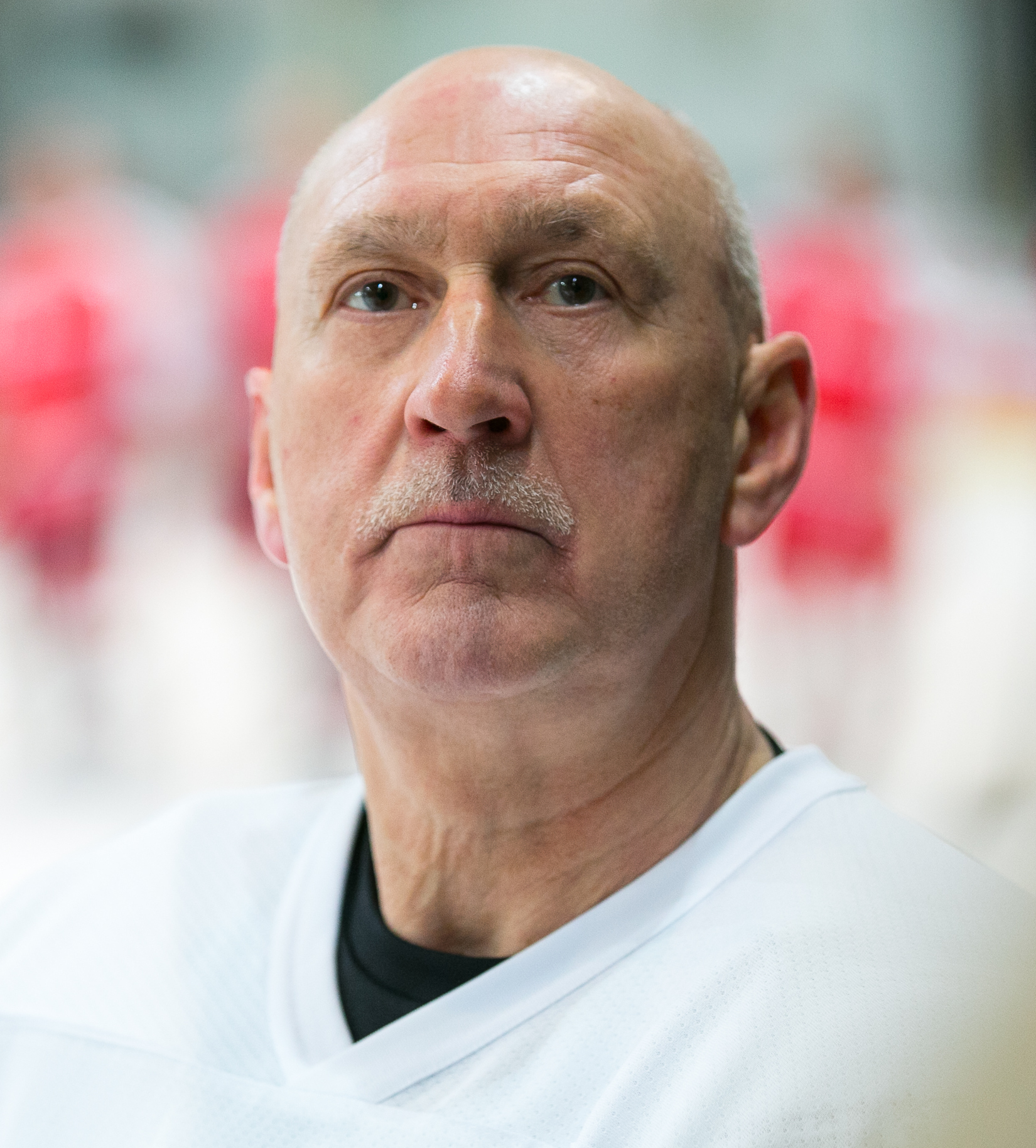
Former Soviet National team player Helmuts Balderis, pictured in 2014. Balderis played a season late in his career with the Minnesota North Stars of the NHL.

In the 1989–90 season, Soviet authorities permitted six more 1980 Olympians – Helmuts Balderis, Slava Fetisov, Alexei Kasatonov, Vladimir Krutov, Sergei Makarov, and Sergei Starikov – to join NHL clubs, but only after they agreed to play in their final World Championship (where they won gold). Makarov won the Calder Memorial Trophy as NHL Rookie of the Year in 1989–90, becoming the oldest player to win that award. Fetisov was a teammate of Mike Ramsey on the 1995 Detroit Red Wings team that lost the Stanley Cup Final to Neal Broten and the New Jersey Devils. Fetisov completed his career by winning Cups with the Red Wings in 1997 and 1998; the first Cup win also made Fetisov a member of the Triple Gold Club, consisting of individuals who have won a Stanley Cup plus gold medals at the Olympics and World Championships.

== Notable rematches ==
The U.S. and the Soviet Union next met at the Winter Olympics in 1988. As in 1980, the Soviets were represented by their star-studded veterans, while the Americans fielded a team of college players. The Soviets won the encounter 7–5 and won the gold medal, while the U.S. placed seventh.

The two teams met again at the 1992 Olympics in a semifinal game. There, the Unified Team (the successor to the Soviet Union) won 5–2. While some stars had left the Soviet Union to play in the NHL, the Unified Team still boasted many veterans from their domestic professional league, while the Americans were represented primarily by college players. The Unified Team eventually won the gold medal, while the U.S. placed fourth.

The U.S., coached by Herb Brooks, and Russia, coached by Viacheslav Fetisov, met twice in the 2002 Winter Olympics in Salt Lake City, which included a 2–2 round-robin draw and a 3–2 semifinal win for the Americans. The semifinal was played 22 years to the day after the "Miracle on Ice" game. The U.S. eventually won silver, while Russia won bronze.

The U.S. and Russia played each other in a round-robin game at the 2014 Winter Olympics in Sochi. The game was tied 2–2 after overtime before the Americans prevailed in an eight-round shootout, with T. J. Oshie scoring on 4 of 6 attempts for the United States. The game has been dubbed by some as the "Marathon on Ice" due to its length. Both teams, however, failed to win a medal; the Americans finished fourth (losing to Canada in the semifinals), while the Russians placed fifth (losing to Finland in the quarterfinals).

== Popular culture ==
Miracle on Ice, a made-for-TV movie starring Karl Malden as Brooks, Steve Guttenberg as Craig, Peter Horton as O'Callahan, and Andrew Stevens as Eruzione aired on ABC television in 1981. It incorporated actual game footage and original commentary from the 1980 Winter Games.

In 2004, Walt Disney Pictures released the film Miracle, directed by Gavin O'Connor and starring Kurt Russell as Brooks. Al Michaels recreated his commentary for most of the games. The final ten seconds and his "Do you believe in miracles? YES!" call were from the original broadcast and used in the film since the filmmakers felt that they could not ask him to recreate the emotion he felt at that moment. The film was dedicated to Brooks, who died shortly after principal photography completed.

Various documentary films have been produced about the Miracle on Ice and its lasting impact:

- Do You Believe in Miracles? The Story of the 1980 U.S. Hockey Team, narrated by Liev Schreiber, premiered on HBO in 2001 and was subsequently released on home video.
- Of Miracles And Men, which was directed by Jonathan Hock, debuted on ESPN in 2015 as part of the channel's 30 for 30 series. In this film, the story of the 1980 matchup is told from the Soviet perspective.
- Miracle: The Boys of '80, co-directed by Max Gershberg and Jacob Rogal, was released by Netflix in 2026, featured never-before-seen footage as well as interviews and a reunion of most living members of the team.

In The X-Files (season 4, episode 7), Cigarette Smoking Man (aka Cancer Man) reveals that he rigged the game by injecting the goaltender with a small amount of novocaine, saying "What's the matter? Don't you believe in miracles?"

Midwest Emo group Oakwood in their album "Summer" released in 2015, song "I'm Still Cheering For The 1980 U.S. Hockey Team" was shown into the light. However, the title of the song does not fully reflect its meaning.

In the opening montage of Season 2 of the alternate history series For All Mankind, it's shown that the US team failed to beat the Soviets, with a final score of 10–3

== Team rosters ==
United States and Soviet Union starting line-ups for the game

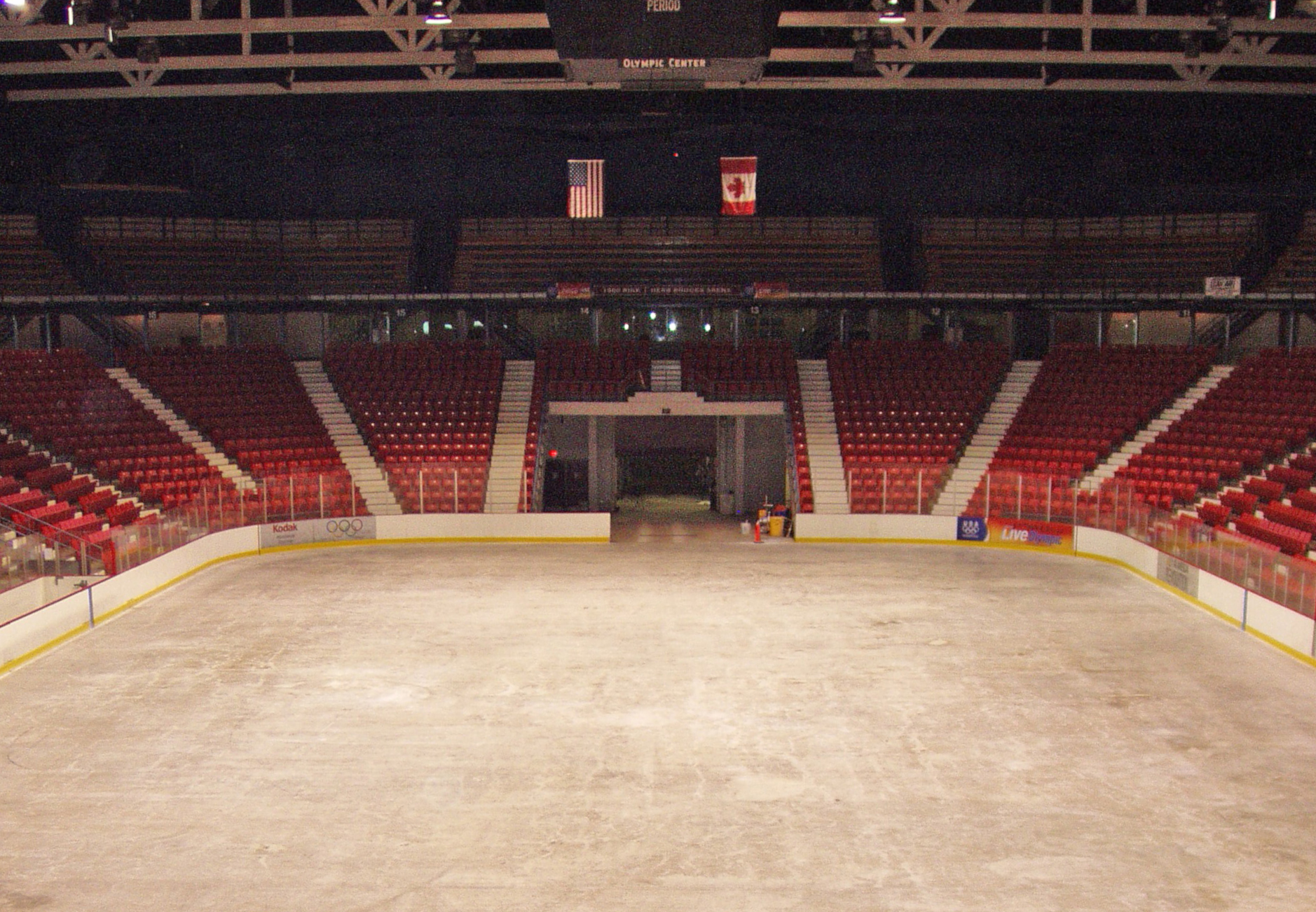
Herb Brooks Arena in 2005

=== United States ===
No.	Pos.	Name	Age	Hometown	College/Professional club
30	G	* Jim Craig	22	North Easton, MA	Boston U.
3	D	* Ken Morrow	23	Flint, MI	Bowling Green
5	D	* Mike Ramsey	19	Minneapolis, MN	Minnesota
10	C	* Mark Johnson	22	Madison, WI	Wisconsin
24	LW	* Rob McClanahan	22	Saint Paul, MN	Minnesota
8	RW	* Dave Silk	21	Scituate, MA	Boston U.
6	D	Bill Baker (A)	22	Grand Rapids, MN	Minnesota
9	C	Neal Broten	20	Roseau, MN	Minnesota
23	RW	Dave Christian	20	Warroad, MN	North Dakota
11	RW	Steve Christoff	21	Richfield, MN	Minnesota
21	LW	Mike Eruzione (C)	25	Winthrop, MA	Philadelphia Firebirds
28	RW	John Harrington	22	Virginia, MN	Oklahoma City Stars
1	G	Steve Janaszak	22	Saint Paul, MN	Minnesota
17	D	Jack O'Callahan	22	Charlestown, MA	Boston U.
16	C	Mark Pavelich	21	Eveleth, MN	Minnesota-Duluth
25	LW	Buzz Schneider	25	Grand Rapids, MN	Milwaukee Admirals
19	RW	Eric Strobel	21	Rochester, MN	Minnesota
20	D	Bob Suter	22	Madison, WI	Tulsa Oilers
27	LW	Phil Verchota	22	Duluth, MN	Minnesota
15	C	Mark Wells	21	St. Clair Shores, MI	Bowling Green

=== Soviet Union ===
No.	Pos.	Name	Age	Hometown	Professional club
20	G	* Vladislav Tretiak	27	Orudyevo	CSKA Moscow
2	D	* Viacheslav Fetisov	21	Moscow	CSKA Moscow
7	D	* Alexei Kasatonov	20	Leningrad	CSKA Moscow
16	C	* Vladimir Petrov	32	Krasnogorsk	CSKA Moscow
17	LW	* Valeri Kharlamov	32	Moscow	CSKA Moscow
13	RW	* Boris Mikhailov (C)	35	Moscow	CSKA Moscow
19	RW	Helmuts Balderis	27	Riga	CSKA Moscow
14	D	Zinetula Bilyaletdinov	24	Moscow	Dynamo Moscow
23	RW	Aleksandr Golikov	27	Penza	Dynamo Moscow
25	C	Vladimir Golikov	25	Penza	Dynamo Moscow
9	LW	Vladimir Krutov	19	Moscow	CSKA Moscow
11	RW	Yuri Lebedev	28	Moscow	Krylya Sovetov Moscow
24	RW	Sergei Makarov	21	Chelyabinsk	CSKA Moscow
10	C/RW	Aleksandr Maltsev	30	Kirovo-Chepetsk	Dynamo Moscow
1	G	Vladimir Myshkin	24	Kirovo-Chepetsk	Dynamo Moscow
5	D	Vasili Pervukhin	24	Penza	Dynamo Moscow
26	LW	Aleksandr Skvortsov	25	Gorky	Torpedo Gorky
12	D	Sergei Starikov	21	Chelyabinsk	CSKA Moscow
6	D	Valeri Vasiliev (A)	30	Gorky	Dynamo Moscow
22	C	Viktor Zhluktov	26	Inta	CSKA Moscow

* Starting line up

== Box score ==
February 22, 1980	United States	4–3	Soviet Union	Olympic Center	Recap

Scoring summary
Period	Team	Goal	Assist(s)	Time	Score
1st	USSR	Vladimir Krutov (6)	Alexei Kasatonov (5)	09:12	1–0 USSR
1st	USA	Buzz Schneider (5)	Mark Pavelich (5)	14:03	1–1
1st	USSR	Sergei Makarov (5)	Alexander Golikov (6)	17:34	2–1 USSR
1st	USA	Mark Johnson (4)	Dave Christian (8) and Dave Silk (2)	19:59	2–2
2nd	USSR	Alexander Maltsev (10) – pp	Vladimir Krutov (4)	02:18	3–2 USSR
3rd	USA	Mark Johnson (5) – pp	Dave Silk (3)	08:39	3–3
3rd	USA	Mike Eruzione (3)	Mark Pavelich (6) and John Harrington (5)	10:00	4–3 USA
Penalty summary
Period	Team	Player	Penalty	Time	PIM
1st	USSR	Boris Mikhailov	Hooking	03:25	2:00
2nd	USA	John Harrington	Holding	00:58	2:00
2nd	USA	Jim Craig (served by Eric Strobel)	Delay of game	09:50	2:00
2nd	USSR	Yuri Lebedev	Unsportsmanlike conduct	17:08	2:00
2nd	USA	Ken Morrow	Cross-checking	17:08	2:00
3rd	USSR	Vladimir Krutov	High-sticking	06:47	2:00

Shots by period
Team	1	2	3	Total
United States	8	2	6	16
Soviet Union	18	12	9	39

Power play opportunities
Team	Goals/Opportunities
United States	1/2
Soviet Union	1/2

== See also ==
- 1976 Philadelphia Flyers–Red Army game

Olympic Games
Preceded by Cathy Freeman	Final Olympic Torchbearer (U.S. team); Salt Lake City 2002	Succeeded by Nikolaos Kaklamanakis
Preceded by Midori Ito	Final Winter Olympic Torchbearer (U.S. team); Salt Lake City 2002	Succeeded by Stefania Belmondo
