= 1979 Challenge Cup (ice hockey) =

Ice hockey competition

| | 1 | 2 | 3 | Total |
|---|---|---|---|---|
| NHL All-Stars | 4 | 4 | 0 | 1 |
| Soviet Union | 2 | 5 | 6 | 2 |
- Location(s): New York City: Madison Square Garden
- Dates: February 8–11, 1979
- Hall of Famers: NHL All-Stars: Bill Barber (1990); Mike Bossy (1991); Gerry Cheevers (1985); Bobby Clarke (1987); Marcel Dionne (1992); Ken Dryden (1983); Tony Esposito (1988); Bob Gainey (1992); Clark Gillies (2002); Guy Lafleur (1988); Guy Lapointe (1993); Lanny McDonald (1992); Gilbert Perreault (1989); Denis Potvin (1991); Larry Robinson (1995); Borje Salming (1996); Serge Savard (1986); Steve Shutt (1993); Darryl Sittler (1989); Bryan Trottier (1997); Soviet Union: Valeri Kharlamov (2005); Sergei Makarov (2016); Vladislav Tretiak (1989); Coaches: Scotty Bowman (1991)
- Networks: Canada: (English): CBC (Games 1 and 2); CTV (Game 3) (French): SRC; United States: NHL Network (Games 1 and 3); CBS (Game 2; 3rd Period Only)
- Announcers: (CBC and CTV) Dan Kelly (1st half, games 1 and 3), Danny Gallivan (2nd half, games 1 and 3 and game 2), Bobby Orr and Dick Irvin Jr. (NHL) Simulcast of the CBC/CTV Broadcast (Games 1 and 3) (CBS) Dan Kelly and Lou Nanne

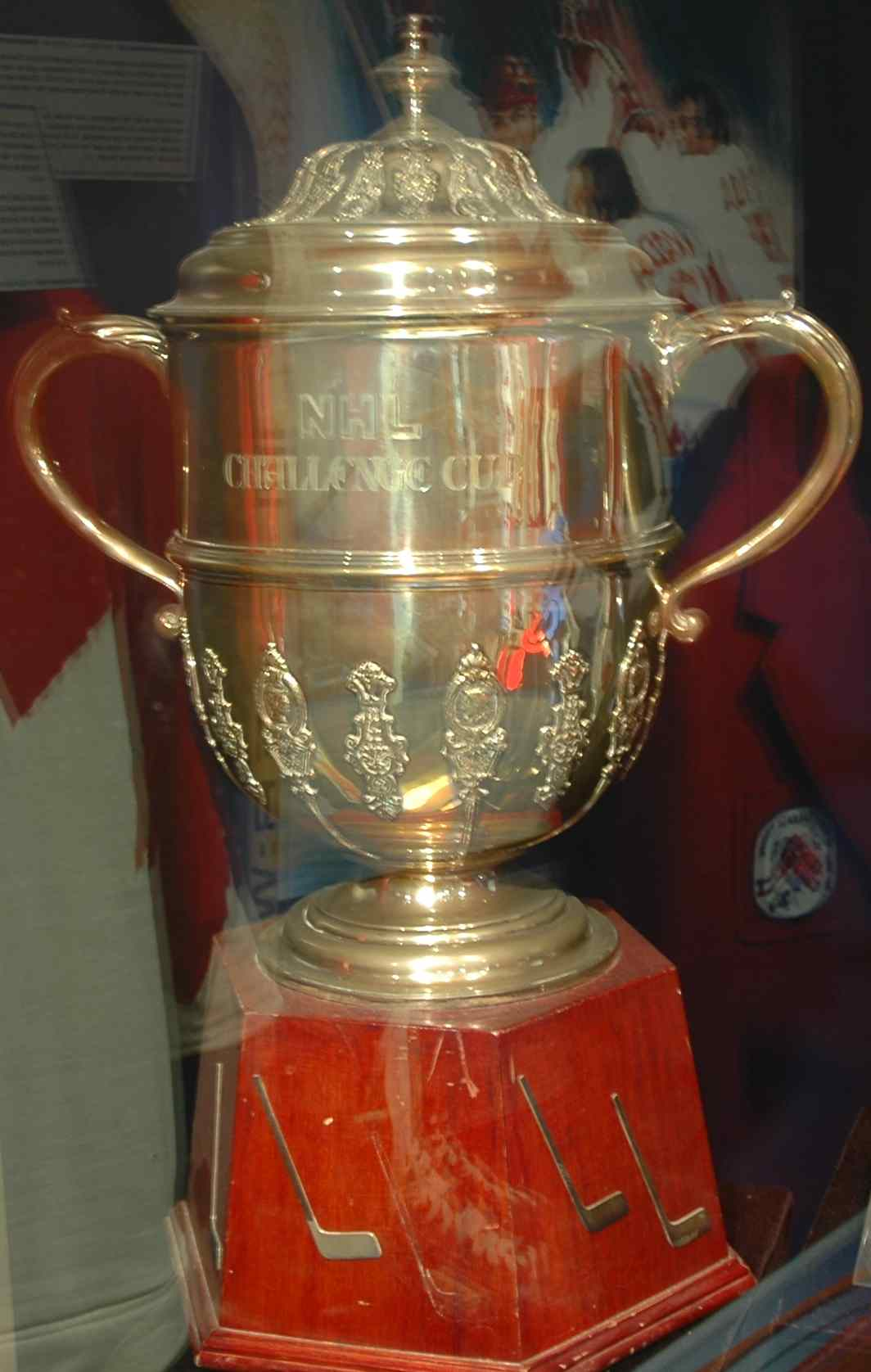
The 1979 Challenge Cup Trophy

The 1979 Challenge Cup was a series of international ice hockey games between the Soviet Union national ice hockey team and a team of All-Stars from the National Hockey League. The games were played on February 8, 10, and 11 at Madison Square Garden in New York City. It replaced the NHL's all-star festivities for the 1978–79 NHL season. The Soviets defeated the NHL All-Stars two games to one.

The team of All-Stars from the National Hockey League included 23 Canadians and three Swedish players. Bobby Orr, Canadian ice hockey player, commenting in the post-game interviews after game two, accidentally called the NHL All-Stars "Team Canada" (because of the number of Canadians on the roster). The Challenge Cup, unlike its predecessor, the Summit Series, included non-Canadian born players in the NHL rosters.

The NHL All-Stars team was coached by Scotty Bowman, and the Soviet Union national team was coached by Viktor Tikhonov.

== NHL All-Stars roster ==
| No. | Nat | Player | Pos | Team |
|---|---|---|---|---|
| 10 | (Canada) | Guy Lafleur | RW | (Canada) Montreal Canadiens |
| 19 | (Canada) | Larry Robinson | D | (Canada) Montreal Canadiens |
| 23 | (Canada) | Bob Gainey | LW | (Canada) Montreal Canadiens |
| 22 | (Canada) | Steve Shutt | LW | (Canada) Montreal Canadiens |
| 11 | (Canada) | Gilbert Perreault | C | (United States) Buffalo Sabres |
| 17 | (Canada) | Marcel Dionne | C | (United States) Los Angeles Kings |
| 27 | (Canada) | Darryl Sittler | C | (Canada) Toronto Maple Leafs |
| 8 | (Canada) | Lanny McDonald | RW | (Canada) Toronto Maple Leafs |
| 16 | (Canada) | Bobby Clarke – C | C | (United States) Philadelphia Flyers |
| 20 | (Canada) | Bryan Trottier | C | (United States) New York Islanders |
| 25 | (Canada) | Mike Bossy | RW | (United States) New York Islanders |
| 9 | (Canada) | Clark Gillies | LW | (United States) New York Islanders |
| 4 | (Canada) | Barry Beck | D | (United States) Colorado Rockies |
| 18 | (Canada) | Serge Savard | D | (Canada) Montreal Canadiens |
| 3 | (Canada) | Guy Lapointe | D | (Canada) Montreal Canadiens |
| | (Canada) | Robert Picard | D | (United States) Washington Capitals |
| 5 | (Canada) | Denis Potvin | D | (United States) New York Islanders |
| 7 | (Canada) | Bill Barber | LW | (United States) Philadelphia Flyers |
| 21 | (Canada) | Don Marcotte | LW | (United States) Boston Bruins |
| 35 | (Canada) | Tony Esposito | G | (United States) Chicago Blackhawks |
| 29 | (Canada) | Ken Dryden | G | (Canada) Montreal Canadiens |
| 30 | (Canada) | Gerry Cheevers | G | (United States) Boston Bruins |
| | (Canada) | Ron Greschner | D | (United States) New York Rangers |
| 26 | (Sweden) | Borje Salming | D | (Canada) Toronto Maple Leafs |
| 12 | (Sweden) | Ulf Nilsson | C | (United States) New York Rangers |
| 15 | (Sweden) | Anders Hedberg | RW | (United States) New York Rangers |

== Soviet Union roster ==
| No. | Nat | Player | Pos | Team |
|---|---|---|---|---|
| 12 | (Soviet Union) | Sergei Starikov | D | (Soviet Union) Traktor Chelyabinsk |
| 22 | (Soviet Union) | Viktor Zhluktov | F | (Soviet Union) CSKA Moscow |
| 5 | (Soviet Union) | Vasili Pervukhin | D | (Soviet Union) Dynamo Moscow |
| 9 | (Soviet Union) | Vladimir Kovin | C | (Soviet Union) Torpedo Gorky |
| 24 | (Soviet Union) | Sergei Makarov | RW | (Soviet Union) CSKA Moscow |
| 10 | (Soviet Union) | Mikhail Varnakov | LW | (Soviet Union) Torpedo Gorky |
| 11 | (Soviet Union) | Aleksandr Skvortsov | RW | (Soviet Union) Torpedo Gorky |
| 25 | (Soviet Union) | Vladimir Golikov | F | (Soviet Union) Dynamo Moscow |
| 23 | (Soviet Union) | Aleksandr Golikov | F | (Soviet Union) Dynamo Moscow |
| 13 | (Soviet Union) | Boris Mikhailov – C | F | (Soviet Union) CSKA Moscow |
| 16 | (Soviet Union) | Vladimir Petrov | F | (Soviet Union) CSKA Moscow |
| 17 | (Soviet Union) | Valeri Kharlamov | F | (Soviet Union) CSKA Moscow |
| 7 | (Soviet Union) | Gennadiy Tsygankov | D | (Soviet Union) CSKA Moscow |
| 6 | (Soviet Union) | Valeri Vasiliev | D | (Soviet Union) Dynamo Moscow |
| 8 | (Soviet Union) | Sergei Kapustin | F | (Soviet Union) CSKA Moscow |
| 2 | (Soviet Union) | Yuri Fedorov | D | (Soviet Union) Torpedo Gorky |
| 14 | (Soviet Union) | Zinetula Bilyaletdinov | D | (Soviet Union) Dynamo Moscow |
| 19 | (Soviet Union) | Helmuts Balderis | RW | (Soviet Union) CSKA Moscow |
| 18 | (Soviet Union) | Irek Gimayev | F | (Soviet Union) Salavat Yulaev Ufa |
| 21 | (Soviet Union) | Viktor Tyumenev | F | (Soviet Union) Krylya Sovetov Moscow |
| 4 | (Soviet Union) | Sergei Babinov | D | (Soviet Union) CSKA Moscow |
| 20 | (Soviet Union) | Vladislav Tretiak | G | (Soviet Union) CSKA Moscow |
| 1 | (Soviet Union) | Vladimir Myshkin | G | (Soviet Union) Krylya Sovetov Moscow |

== Uniforms ==
The NHL vastly simplified their white All-Star uniforms, removing most of the striping and stars. The NHL shield on the front was enlarged, while the logos on the shoulders remained the same. The striping was reduced to two thin stripes, orange over black, separated by a thin white stripe. The names on the back remained in black with orange trim, and the numerals remained orange with black trim.

The Soviet team used their standard red national uniforms, which they also used when touring against the teams of the World Hockey Association (while billed as the "Soviet All-Stars"). The jerseys featured two white stripes at the waistline - one thin stripe over a wider stripe studded with red diamonds. The sleeve stripes followed a similar pattern, but without the diamonds on the wide stripes, and an additional white stripe below the wide band. While the Soviet team normally used the Russian language on its uniforms, the names on the back of the jerseys for the Challenge Cup were romanized for the event. The front of the jerseys retained the Russian СССР initials.

== Game log ==
=== Game 1 ===
- Date: Thursday February 8, 1979
- Time: 8:00pm
- Location: New York City: Madison Square Garden
- Attendance: 17,438

==== Score ====
NHL All-Stars 4 – Soviet Union 2

Scoring summary
| Period | Team | Goal | Assist(s) | Time | Score |
|---|---|---|---|---|---|
| 1st | NHL | Guy Lafleur | Bobby Clarke and Steve Shutt | 0:16 | 1-0 NHL |
| 1st | NHL | Mike Bossy – pp | Gilbert Perreault and Guy Lafleur | 6:22 | 2-0 NHL |
| 1st | USSR | Boris Mikhailov – pp | Valeri Vasiliev and Valeri Kharlamov | 11:25 | 2-1 NHL |
| 1st | NHL | Bob Gainey | Bill Barber and Barry Beck | 15:48 | 3-1 NHL |
| 2nd | NHL | Clark Gillies | Mike Bossy | 8:14 | 4-1 NHL |
| 3rd | USSR | Vladimir Golikov | Aleksandr Golikov and Sergei Makarov | 3:02 | 4-2 NHL |

Penalty summary
| Period | Team | Player | Penalty | Time | PIM |
|---|---|---|---|---|---|
| 1st | USSR | Viktor Zhluktov | Hooking | 0:59 | 2:00 |
| 1st | USSR | Vladimir Petrov | Hooking | 5:13 | 2:00 |
| 1st | NHL | Lanny McDonald | High-sticking | 8:31 | 2:00 |
| 1st | NHL | Clark Gillies | Charging | 10:59 | 2:00 |
| 1st | USSR | Viktor Zhluktov | Interference | 12:21 | 2:00 |
| 2nd | USSR | Gennadiy Tsygankov | Holding | 10:48 | 2:00 |

Shots by period
| Team | 1 | 2 | 3 | Total |
|---|---|---|---|---|
| NHL All-Stars | 10 | 9 | 5 | 24 |
| Soviet Union | 6 | 5 | 9 | 20 |

Power play opportunities
| Team | Goals/Opportunities |
|---|---|
| NHL All-Stars | 1/2 |
| Soviet Union | 1/2 |

Goaltenders
| Min. | Team | Goalies | Saves | Goals Against |
|---|---|---|---|---|
| 60:00 | NHL | Ken Dryden | 18 | 2 Goals |
| 60:00 | USSR | Vladislav Tretiak | 20 | 4 Goals |

==== Officials ====
- Referee – (Canada) Bob Myers
- Linesman – (Canada) Ray Scapinello
- Linesman – (Canada) John D'Amico

=== Game 2 ===
- Date: Saturday February 10, 1979
- Time: 2:00pm
- Location: New York City: Madison Square Garden
- Attendance: 17,438

==== Score ====
NHL All-Stars 4 – Soviet Union 5

Scoring summary
| Period | Team | Goal | Assist(s) | Time | Score |
|---|---|---|---|---|---|
| 1st | USSR | Sergei Kapustin | Sergei Starikov | 8:10 | 0-1 USSR |
| 1st | NHL | Mike Bossy – pp | Bryan Trottier and Clark Gillies | 13:35 | 1-1 |
| 1st | NHL | Bryan Trottier | Clark Gillies and Mike Bossy | 18:21 | 2-1 NHL |
| 2nd | NHL | Gilbert Perreault | Darryl Sittler | 0:27 | 3-1 NHL |
| 2nd | USSR | Mikhail Varnakov | Aleksandr Skvortsov | 2:05 | 3-2 NHL |
| 2nd | NHL | Larry Robinson | Guy Lafleur and Marcel Dionne | 5:06 | 4-2 NHL |
| 2nd | USSR | Boris Mikhailov – pp | Vladimir Petrov and Valeri Vasiliev | 17:02 | 4-3 NHL |
| 2nd | USSR | Sergei Kapustin | Viktor Zhluktov | 7:47 | 4-4 |
| 3rd | USSR | Vladimir Golikov | Sergei Makarov | 1:31 | 4-5 USSR |

Penalty summary
| Period | Team | Player | Penalty | Time | PIM |
|---|---|---|---|---|---|
| 1st | USSR | Vladimir Kovin | Cross-checking | 12:32 | 2:00 |
| 1st | NHL | Gilbert Perreault | Holding | 15:13 | 2:00 |
| 2nd | NHL | Borje Salming | Interference | 8:04 | 2:00 |
| 2nd | NHL | Barry Beck | Boarding | 15:07 | 2:00 |

Shots by period
| Team | 1 | 2 | 3 | Total |
|---|---|---|---|---|
| NHL All-Stars | 5 | 5 | 6 | 16 |
| Soviet Union | 7 | 14 | 10 | 31 |

Power play opportunities
| Team | Goals/Opportunities |
|---|---|
| NHL All-Stars | 1/2 |
| Soviet Union | 1/2 |

Goaltenders
| Min. | Team | Goalies | Saves | Goals Against |
|---|---|---|---|---|
| 60:00 | NHL | Ken Dryden | 26 | 5 Goals |
| 60:00 | USSR | Vladislav Tretiak | 12 | 4 Goals |

==== Officials ====
- Referee – (Soviet Union) Viktor Dombrovski
- Linesman – (Canada) Matt Pavelich
- Linesman – (Canada) Ron Finn

=== Game 3 ===
- Date: Sunday February 11, 1979
- Time: 8:00pm
- Location: New York City: Madison Square Garden
- Attendance: 17,545

==== Score ====
NHL All-Stars 0 – Soviet Union 6

Scoring summary
| Period | Team | Goal | Assist(s) | Time | Score |
|---|---|---|---|---|---|
| 2nd | USSR | Boris Mikhailov | Aleksandr Golikov | 5:47 | 0-1 USSR |
| 2nd | USSR | Viktor Zhluktov – pp | Helmuts Balderis and Valeri Vasiliev | 7:44 | 0-2 USSR |
| 3rd | USSR | Helmuts Balderis | Irek Gimayev | 8:44 | 0-3 USSR |
| 3rd | USSR | Vladimir Kovin | Aleksandr Skvortsov and Mikhail Varnakov | 10:21 | 0-4 USSR |
| 3rd | USSR | Sergei Makarov | Sergei Kapustin | 12:44 | 0-5 USSR |
| 3rd | USSR | Aleksandr Golikov | | 14:46 | 0-6 USSR |

Penalty summary
| Period | Team | Player | Penalty | Time | PIM |
|---|---|---|---|---|---|
| 2nd | NHL | Don Marcotte | Elbowing | 6:27 | 2:00 |
| 2nd | USSR | Valeri Vasiliev | Holding | 10:48 | 2:00 |
| 2nd | USSR | Vladimir Myshkin (Served by Irek Gimayev) | Roughing | 12:27 | 2:00 |
| 2nd | NHL | Bryan Trottier | Roughing | 12:27 | 2:00 |
| 3rd | USSR | Boris Mikhailov | Holding | 14:22 | 2:00 |

Shots by period
| Team | 1 | 2 | 3 | Total |
|---|---|---|---|---|
| NHL All-Stars | 7 | 7 | 10 | 24 |
| Soviet Union | 6 | 6 | 7 | 19 |

Power play opportunities
| Team | Goals/Opportunities |
|---|---|
| NHL All-Stars | 0/2 |
| Soviet Union | 1/2 |

Goaltenders
| Min. | Team | Goalies | Saves | Goals Against |
|---|---|---|---|---|
| 60:00 | NHL | Gerry Cheevers | 13 | 6 Goals |
| 60:00 | USSR | Vladimir Myshkin | 24 | 0 Goals |

==== Officials ====
- Referee – (Canada) Andy Van Hellemond
- Linesman – (Canada) Leon Stickle
- Linesman – (Canada) Claude Bechard

== Broadcasters ==
In the United States, Game 2, which was held on a Saturday afternoon, was shown on CBS as part of CBS Sports Spectacular. The network refused to expand CBS Sports Spectacular to carry the game in full so instead, the show came on during the second intermission, showed taped highlights of the first two periods, and then showed the final period live. The lead-in to Sports Spectacular was The World's Strongest Man. The then-CBS affiliate in Boston, the old WNAC-TV, broadcast a local college hockey game that led into Sports Spectacular.

The network, the show and their sponsors had a problem with the rink board advertising that the NHL sold at Madison Square Garden, and refused to allow them to be shown on television. As a result, CBS viewers were unable to see the far boards above the yellow kickplate, and could only see players' skates when the play moved to that side of the ice. Games 1 and 3 were shown on the NHL Network, where the advertising was no problem.

Dan Kelly and Lou Nanne called the game for CBS while Dick Stockton served as the host.
