= Speed skating at the 1980 Winter Olympics – Men's 10,000 metres =

Speed skating at the Olympics

Men's 10,000 metres at the XIII Olympic Winter Games
- Pictogram for speed skating
- Venue: James B. Sheffield Olympic Skating Rink
- Dates: February 23, 1980
- Competitors: 24 from 13 nations
- Winning time: 14:28.13 WR

Medalists
1st place, gold medalist(s)		Eric Heiden; United States
2nd place, silver medalist(s)		Piet Kleine; Netherlands
3rd place, bronze medalist(s)		Tom Erik Oxholm; Norway

The men's 10,000 metres in speed skating at the 1980 Winter Olympics took place on 23 February, at the James B. Sheffield Olympic Skating Rink.

== Records ==
Prior to this competition, the existing world and Olympic records were as follows:

World record	Viktor Lyoskin (URS)	14:34.33	Alma-Ata, Kazakh SSR, Soviet Union	3 April 1977
Olympic record	Piet Kleine (NED)	14:50.59	Innsbruck, Austria	14 February 1976

The following new Olympic and World records was set during the competition.

Date	Pair	Athlete	Country	Time	OR	WR
23 February	Pair 1	Tom Erik Oxholm	Norway	14:36.60	OR	
23 February	Pair 2	Eric Heiden	United States	14:28.13	OR	WR

== Results ==
Rank	Pair	Lane	Athlete	Country	Time	Time behind	Notes
1st place, gold medalist(s)	2	i	Eric Heiden	United States	14:28.13	–	WR
2nd place, silver medalist(s)	6	i	Piet Kleine	Netherlands	14:36.03	+7.90	
3rd place, bronze medalist(s)	1	o	Tom Erik Oxholm	Norway	14:36.60	+8.46	
4	1	i	Mike Woods	United States	14:39.53	+11.40	
5	3	o	Øyvind Tveter	Norway	14:43.53	+15.40	
6	3	i	Hilbert van der Duim	Netherlands	14:47.58	+19.45	
7	2	o	Viktor Lyoskin	Soviet Union	14:51.72	+23.59	
8	8	o	Andreas Ehrig	East Germany	14:51.94	+23.80	
9	4	o	Yasuhiro Shimizu	Japan	14:57.48	+29.35	
10	9	i	Sergey Berezin	Soviet Union	15:04.68	+36.55	
11	5	o	Yep Kramer	Netherlands	15:04.79	+36.66	
12	6	o	Tomas Gustafson	Sweden	15:05.18	+37.05	
13	4	i	Alf Rekstad	Norway	15:05.70	+37.57	
14	7	i	Örjan Sandler	Sweden	15:11.52	+43.39	
15	10	i	Andreas Dietel	East Germany	15:15.03	+46.90	
16	10	o	Dmitry Ogloblin	Soviet Union	15:20.14	+52.01	
17	5	i	Masahiko Yamamoto	Japan	15:26.92	+58.79	
18	7	o	Colin Coates	Australia	15:28.30	+1:00.17	
19	11	i	Pertti Niittylä	Finland	15:29.98	+1:01.85	
20	12	i	Andrei Erdely	Romania	15:31.73	+1:03.60	
21	9	o	Ulf Ekstrand	Sweden	15:33.42	+1:05.29	
22	12	o	Maurizio Marchetto	Italy	15:56.73	+1:28,60	
23	13	o	Na Yun-Su	South Korea	16:00.41	+1:32,28	
24	11	i	John French	Great Britain	16:17.56	+1:49.43	
-	6	i	Craig Kressler	United States	DNF		
