= Yuri Lebedev =

Yuri Lebedev may refer to:

- Yuri Lebedev (ice hockey) (born 1952), Soviet Russian ice hockey player
- Yuri Lebedev (footballer) (born 1987), Russian footballer
