= Vladimir Myshkin =

Russian ice hockey player

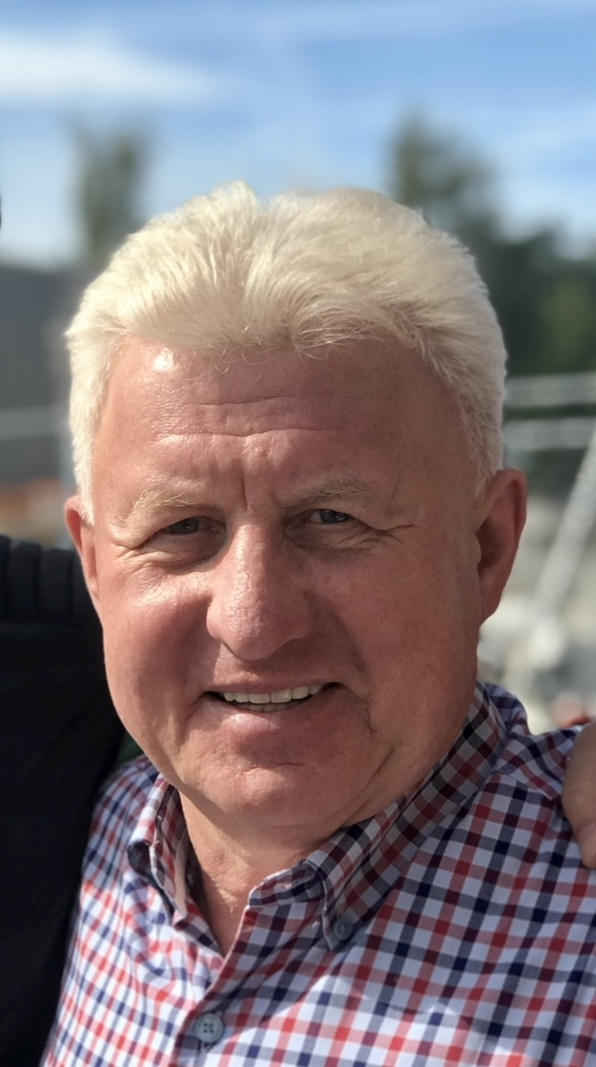
- Myshkin in 2018
- Born: June 19, 1955 (age 71) Kirovo-Chepetsk, Russian SFSR, Soviet Union
- Height: 5 ft 7 in (170 cm)
- Weight: 154 lb (70 kg; 11 st 0 lb)
- Position: Goalie
- Caught: Left
- Played for: Olimpiya Kirovo-Chepetsk; Krylia Sovetov Moscow; HC Dynamo Moscow; Lukko
- National team: Soviet Union
- Playing career: 1977–1991
Medal record
Men's ice hockey
Representing Soviet Union
Olympic Games
Silver medal – second place	1980 Lake Placid
Gold medal – first place	1984 Sarajevo
World Championships
Gold medal – first place	1979 Soviet Union
Gold medal – first place	1981 Sweden
Gold medal – first place	1982 Finland
Gold medal – first place	1983 West Germany
Bronze medal – third place	1985 Prague
Gold medal – first place	1989 Sweden
Gold medal – first place	1990 Switzerland
Bronze medal – third place	1991 Finland
Canada Cup
Gold medal – first place	1981 Canada
IIHF World Junior Championship
Gold medal – first place	1974 USSR

Vladimir Semenovich Myshkin (Russian: Владимир Семёнович Мышкин; born June 19, 1955) is a Russian former ice hockey goaltender. He was a goaltender for HC Dynamo Moscow and the Soviet Union national ice hockey team in the 1970s and 1980s.

== Life and career ==
Myshkin was born in Kirovo-Chepetsk, Russian SFSR, Soviet Union. During his career in the Soviet Championship League, Myshkin was consistently among the top goaltenders in the league, and his Dynamo Moscow club was always among the best. However, rival Moscow club HC CSKA Moscow won the championship almost every year he played, including an unprecedented 13-year run from 1977 to 1989, preventing Myshkin from winning a domestic championship until his last year.

Myshkin came to prominence in the late 1970s when he earned a spot on the Soviet national team as a backup to the legendary Vladislav Tretiak. On February 11, 1979, he was the surprise choice of coach Viktor Tikhonov to start in the deciding game in the Challenge Cup tournament against the National Hockey League all stars. Myshkin responded with a sterling effort, shutting out the NHL stars 6–0 to win the Challenge Cup for the Soviets. A couple of months later, he won the 1979 Ice Hockey World Championships, the others coming in 1981, 1982, 1983, 1989, and 1990.

After Tretiak gave up two goals in the first period of the Miracle on Ice game versus the USA in the medal round of the 1980 Winter Olympics, Tikhonov replaced him with Myshkin. He faced only two shots in the second period, and stopped them both, but gave up two goals in the third scored by Americans Mark Johnson and Mike Eruzione. Team USA won the game 4–3 and went on to capture the gold medal with the Soviet Union taking the silver.

In 1981, Myshkin was a member of the Soviet team that won the Canada Cup, the only time Canada failed to win the tournament. He played in one game and backed up Tretiak for the 8–1 victory in the final.

In 1984, he won his only Olympic gold medal, backing up Tretiak for the last time.

In his first major event as starting goaltender of the Soviet national team, he led the Soviets to a perfect 5-0 record in the round robin of the 1984 Canada Cup by going 3-0 in his three starts before being defeated by Canada 3-2 in overtime in the semifinals. Nonetheless, Myshkin played spectacularly that game in a losing cause, being named the USSR's player of the game, and was named to the tournament all-star team.

At the 1985 World Ice Hockey Championships Myshkin was selected for the first (and only) time as the starting goaltender of the national team. He backstopped them to a bronze medal after surprising medal round losses to Czechoslovakia and Canada, being the first time the Canadians beat the Soviet Union at the World Championships since 1961. The following year, the 31-year-old Myshkin was replaced by younger goaltenders Evgeny Belosheikin and Sergei Mylnikov. After 1985, he appeared in three more World Championships, but only as the team's third-string goaltender. In 1991 this was a largely sentimental gesture, as Myshkin had already announced he would retire following the season, and he backed up Andrei Trefilov and Alexei Marjin in the last World Championship in which the USSR would compete.

Myshkin's final season in 1990 would be a memorable one. First, he won the Soviet League championship for the only time in his career, as his Dynamo club ended CSKA's long championship reign and won its first title since 1954. Then at the World Championships, after watching his team's first nine games, he replaced Artūrs Irbe in very last game for the final 3 plus minutes of the shut out versus Czechoslovakia 5–0 and clinched the gold medal.

== Career statistics ==
=== International ===
Year	Team	Event	GP	W	L	T	MIN	GA	SO	GAA	SV%
1974	Soviet Union	WJC	3	—	—	—	-	-	-	-	—
1979	Soviet Union	WC	2	1	0	0	73	2	0	1.67	.867
1980	Soviet Union	OLY	5	4	1	0	260	9	0	2.08	.896
1981	Soviet Union	CC	1	0	1	0	60	7	0	7.00	.787
1981	Soviet Union	WC	1	0	0	1	60	1	0	1.00	—
1982	Soviet Union	WC	3	1	0	1	136	1	2	0.44	.983
1983	Soviet Union	WC	3	3	0	0	180	6	0	2.00	.918
1984	Soviet Union	OLY	1	1	0	0	60	1	0	1.00	-
1984	Soviet Union	CC	4	3	1	0	252	6	1	1.43	.940
1985	Soviet Union	WC	10	8	2	0	580	13	1	1.34	.936
1989	Soviet Union	WC	1	0	0	0	5	0	0	0.00	—
1990	Soviet Union	WC	1	0	0	0	3	0	0	0.00	—
1991	Soviet Union	WC	1	0	0	0	0	0	0	-	—
Junior totals			3	—	—	—	-	-	-	-	—
Senior totals			33	21	5	2	1669	46	4	1.65	—
