= Anatoly Medennikov =

Soviet speed skater

Personal information
- Nationality: Soviet
- Born: 16 March 1958 (age 68) Sverdlovsk, Russian SFSR, Soviet Union

Sport
- Sport: Speed skating

Anatoly Medennikov (born 16 March 1958) is a Soviet speed skater. He competed in two events at the 1980 Winter Olympics.

== Career ==
Anatoly Medennikov was born in Sverdlovsk, where he first started skating. But before that, he was better than others at football. However, at the age of 11, he caught the eye of skating coaches and was invited to the Sverdlovsk special school "Dynamo", where he began training with Yuri Derkach. They understood each other perfectly, and ultimately, success came quickly. In the mid-70s, he was the winner and record holder of the USSR at the national championship among juniors, at the championship of the Nordic countries.

In 1977, he won the USSR Junior Championship in the sprint, and a year later, in the 500-meter race. In 1978, Anatoly Medennikov took 5th place at the World Junior Championships in Montreal and became the silver medalist of the national championship in the sprint. In April, he set two USSR records and simultaneously two world records at the Medeo skating rink in the 1000-meter distance with a time of 1:14.46 and in the sprint all-around - 150.035.

In 1979, at his debut World Championships in the sprint all-around, he took 27th place, and in March he won the USSR Championships in sprint for the first time. In 1980, Medennikov again became the national champion in sprint and went to the Winter Olympics in Lake Placid, where he took 7th place in the 500 meters and 15th place in the 1000 meters. A year later, he took 2nd place in the Union Championships and won a bronze medal at the World Sprint Championships in Grenoble .
