= Irina Kuleshova-Kovrova =

Russian speed skater

Personal information
- Nationality: Russian
- Born: 4 January 1962 (age 63); Moscow, Soviet Union

Sport
- Sport: Speed skating

Irina Kuleshova-Kovrova (born 4 January 1962) is a Russian former speed skater. She competed at the 1980 Winter Olympics and the 1984 Winter Olympics, representing the Soviet Union.
