= Vladimir Golikov =

Russian ice hockey player

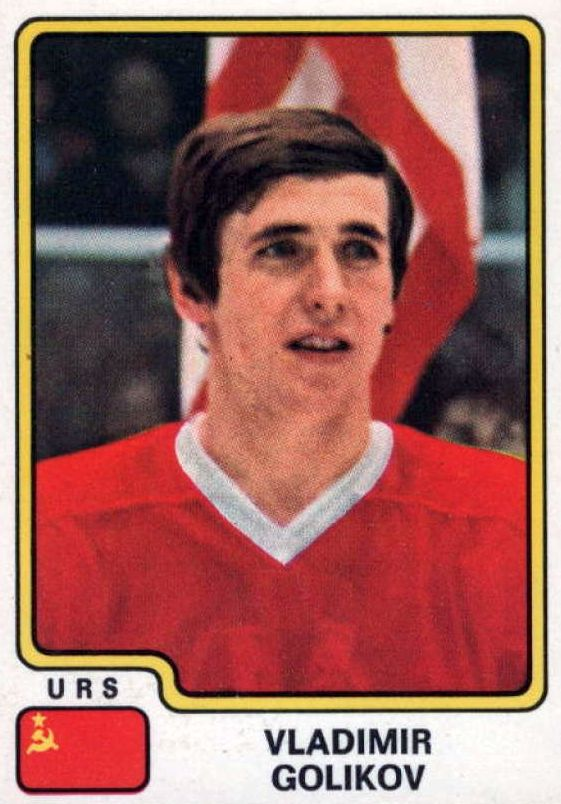
- Born: June 20, 1954 (age 72) Penza, Russian SFSR, Soviet Union
- Height: 6 ft 0 in (183 cm)
- Weight: 185 lb (84 kg; 13 st 3 lb)
- Position: Centre
- Shot: Right
- Played for: Dynamo Moscow
- National team: Soviet Union
- Playing career: 1976–1985
Medal record
Men's ice hockey
Silver medal – second place	1980 Lake Placid	Team
World Championships
Silver medal – second place	1976 Poland
Bronze medal – third place	1977 Austria
Gold medal – first place	1978 Czechoslovakia
Gold medal – first place	1979 Soviet Union
Gold medal – first place	1981 Sweden
Gold medal – first place	1982 Finland
Canada Cup
Gold medal – first place	1981 Canada

Vladimir Nikolayevich Golikov (Russian: Владимир Николаевич Голиков) (born June 20, 1954) is a Russian former professional ice hockey player who played in the Soviet Hockey League. He played for HC Dynamo Moscow. Inducted into the Russian and Soviet Hockey Hall of Fame in 1978, he is also the brother of another hockey player, Aleksandr Golikov.

Golikov played on the winning Soviet team in the Challenge Cup between the Soviet Union and NHL All-Stars. He also competed on the Soviet team at the Winter Olympics in 1980, winning silver in men's ice hockey.

== Career statistics ==
			Regular season
Season	Team	League	GP	G	A	Pts	PIM
1971–72	Dizel Penza	Soviet2	32	12	3	15	12
1972–73	Dizel Penza	Soviet3	—	12	—	—	—
1973–74	Khimik Voskresensk	Soviet	30	11	3	14	12
1974–75	Khimik Voskresensk	Soviet	35	11	4	15	10
1975–76	Khimik Voskresensk	Soviet	35	6	16	22	44
1976–77	Khimik Voskresensk	Soviet	36	16	12	28	30
1977–78	HC Dynamo Moscow	Soviet	36	18	26	44	25
1978–79	HC Dynamo Moscow	Soviet	34	19	17	36	30
1979–80	HC Dynamo Moscow	Soviet	42	24	14	38	38
1980–81	HC Dynamo Moscow	Soviet	46	23	16	39	54
1981–82	HC Dynamo Moscow	Soviet	44	13	10	23	52
1982–83	HC Dynamo Moscow	Soviet	36	14	11	25	22
1983–84	HC Dynamo Moscow	Soviet	42	9	11	20	18
1984–85	HC Dynamo Moscow	Soviet	19	8	3	11	0
Soviet totals			435	172	143	315	335
