= Zinetula Bilyaletdinov =

Russian ice hockey player

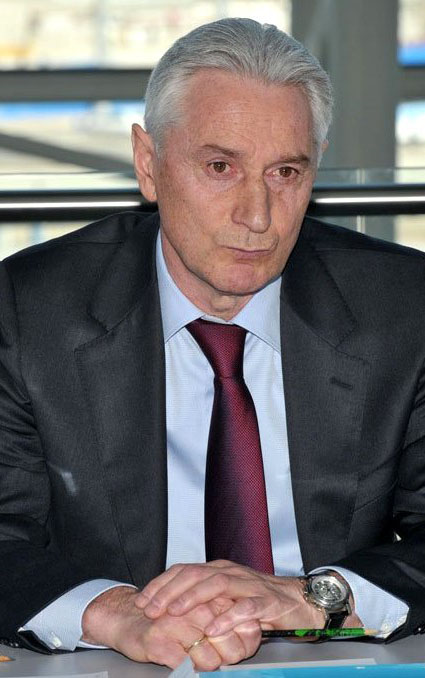
- Bilyaletdinov in 2013
- Born: 13 March 1955 (age 71) Moscow, Russian SFSR, Soviet Union
- Height: 5 ft 11 in (180 cm)
- Weight: 189 lb (86 kg; 13 st 7 lb)
- Position: Defence
- Shot: Left
- Played for: HC Dynamo Moscow
- National team: Soviet Union
- Playing career: 1973–1988
Medal record
Olympic Games
Gold medal – first place	1984 Sarajevo	Team
Silver medal – second place	1980 Lake Placid	Team

Zinetula Khaidarovich "Bill" Bilyaletdinov (Russian: Зинэтула Хайдарович Билялетдинов, Tatar: Зиннәтулла Хәйдәр улы Билалетдинев; born 13 March 1955) is a former Russian ice hockey player of Tatar descent, who played for the USSR.

From 1973–1988 Bilyaletdinov played for HC Dynamo Moscow. As a coach, he won the Russian Championship in the 2005–2006 season and the 2007 European Champions Cup, as well as the first-ever KHL Gagarin Cup championship as coaching Ak Bars Kazan.

Bilyaletdinov served as an assistant coach for the Winnipeg Jets in the 1994 and 1995 seasons, and as an assistant coach for the Phoenix Coyotes during the 1996–1997 season.

In June 2011, Bilyaletdinov was appointed to head coach of the Russian national ice hockey team. As the head coach of the national team, Bilyaletdinov has emphasised defensive discipline.

In 2012, Russia won the 2012 IIHF World Championship in Helsinki. Russia won all its matches of the tournament in regulation time, the first time any team had done so since the Soviet Union in 1989. After the tournament, star player Alexander Semin praised Bilyaletdinov's disciplined approach and focus on retaining possession of the puck. He was fired after Russia men's national ice hockey team was eliminated in the quarterfinals at the 2014 Winter Olympics.

== Personal life ==
Bilyaletdinov has a daughter Natalya. His grandson Alexander Romanov is a defenceman for the New York Islanders. Father Khaydar Bilyaletdinov was born in Nizhny Novgorod Oblast Mishar village Pitsa (Пица).

== Career statistics ==
=== Regular season ===
			Regular season
Season	Team	League	GP	G	A	Pts	PIM
1973–74	Dynamo Moscow	USSR	22	0	1	1	2
1974–75	Dynamo Moscow	USSR	36	2	1	3	6
1975–76	Dynamo Moscow	USSR	34	1	2	3	13
1976–77	Dynamo Moscow	USSR	33	1	4	5	18
1977–78	Dynamo Moscow	USSR	35	2	3	5	27
1978–79	Dynamo Moscow	USSR	43	6	4	10	55
1979–80	Dynamo Moscow	USSR	43	14	8	22	44
1980–81	Dynamo Moscow	USSR	49	6	5	11	54
1981–82	Dynamo Moscow	USSR	47	6	9	15	28
1982–83	Dynamo Moscow	USSR	42	1	8	9	20
1983–84	Dynamo Moscow	USSR	42	2	6	8	36
1984–85	Dynamo Moscow	USSR	36	4	8	12	24
1985–86	Dynamo Moscow	USSR	40	11	14	25	38
1986–87	Dynamo Moscow	USSR	40	6	5	11	12
1987–88	Dynamo Moscow	USSR	46	1	10	11	20
1989–90	Dynamo Moscow II	USSR III	20	0	2	2	26
1990–91	Dynamo Moscow II	USSR III	21	1	3	4	4
USSR totals			588	63	88	151	397

=== International ===
Year	Team	Event	GP	G	A	Pts	PIM
1974	Soviet Union	EJC	5	0	0	0	4
1974	Soviet Union	WJC	5	1	0	1	5
1975	Soviet Union	WJC	—	2	0	2	—
1976	Soviet Union	CC	5	0	1	1	4
1978	Soviet Union	WC	10	0	0	0	17
1979	Soviet Union	WC	8	3	4	7	2
1980	Soviet Union	OG	7	1	3	4	24
1981	Soviet Union	WC	8	1	2	3	2
1981	Soviet Union	CC	7	0	0	0	2
1982	Soviet Union	WC	9	2	1	3	14
1983	Soviet Union	WC	7	0	3	3	10
1984	Soviet Union	OG	7	1	1	2	0
1984	Soviet Union	CC	6	0	0	0	12
1985	Soviet Union	WC	10	0	0	0	14
1986	Soviet Union	WC	8	0	1	1	14
1987	Soviet Union	WC	3	0	2	2	4
Senior totals			95	8	18	26	119
