= Dmitry Ogloblin =

Soviet speed skater

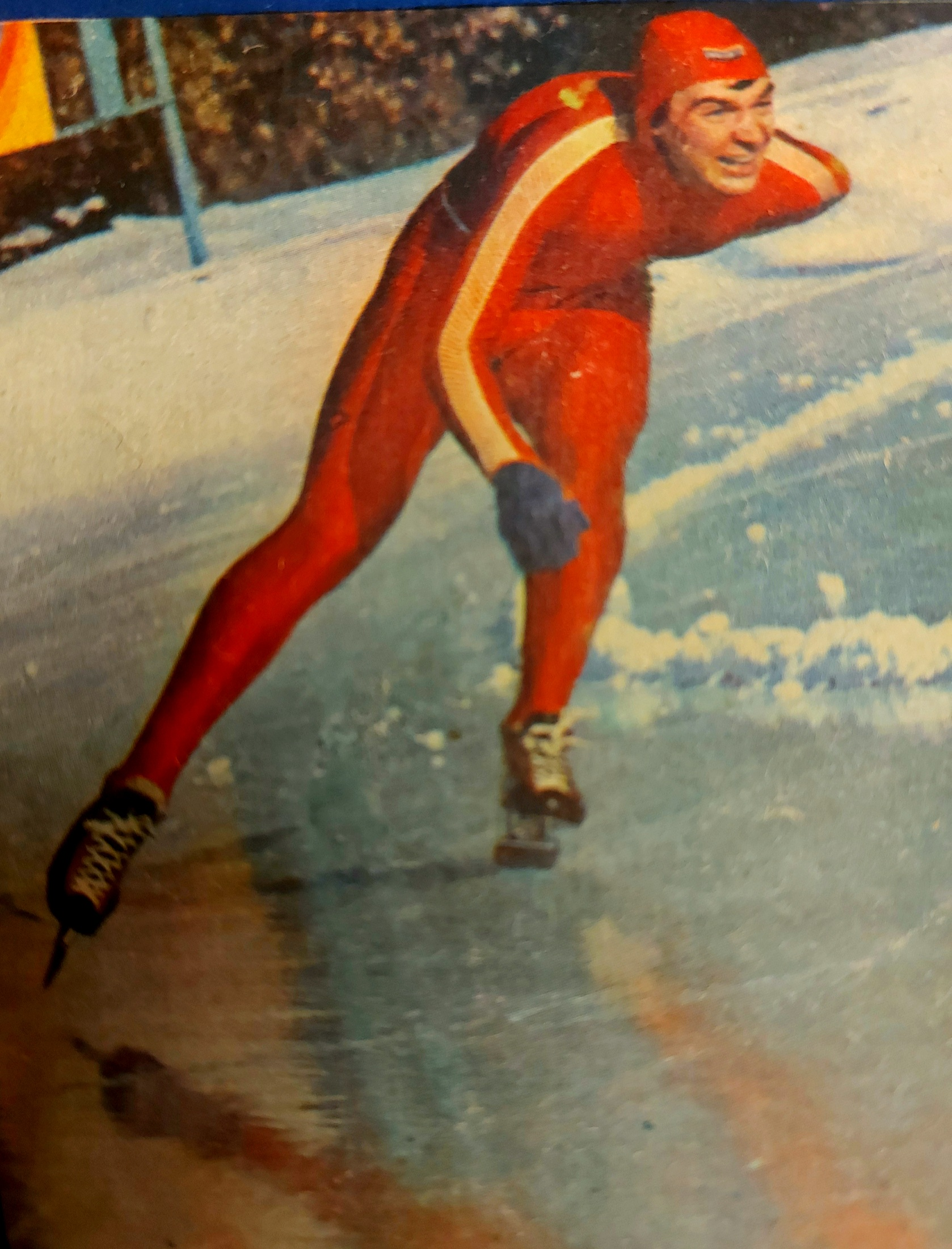

Dmitry Igorievich Ogloblin (Russian: Дмитрий Игоревич Оглоблин; born 24 February 1956 in Lesnoy) is a former Soviet speedskater. In 1979, he set a world record in 3,000 metres (9,800 ft) in Medeo with the time 4:04.06. The following year, he set a world record in 10,000 metres (33,000 ft) in Medeo with the time 14:26.71.

== World records ==
Discipline	Time	Date	Location
3000 m	4.04,06	28 March 1979	(Soviet Union) Medeo
10,000 m	14.26,71	29 March 1980	(Soviet Union) Medeo

Source: SpeedSkatingStats.com
