= Sergei Starikov =

Russian ice hockey player (born 1958)

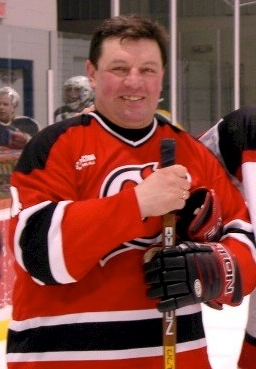
- Sergei Starikov in 2005
- Born: December 4, 1958 (age 67) Chelyabinsk, Russian SFSR, Soviet Union
- Height: 5 ft 10 in (178 cm)
- Weight: 224 lb (102 kg; 16 st 0 lb)
- Position: Defence
- Shot: Left
- Played for: Traktor Chelyabinsk; CSKA Moscow; New Jersey Devils
- National team: Soviet Union
- NHL draft: 152nd overall, 1989; New Jersey Devils
- Playing career: 1976–1993
Medal record
Men's ice hockey
| Gold medal – first place | 1984 Sarajevo | Team |
| Gold medal – first place | 1988 Calgary | Team |
| Silver medal – second place | 1980 Lake Placid | Team |

Sergei Viktorovich Starikov (Russian: Серге́й Ви́кторович Ста́риков) (born December 4, 1958) is a Russian ice hockey coach and former player, who competed as defenseman for the Soviet national team.

Sergei Starikov won 9 national titles in the Soviet Union. Participating in 3 Olympic Tournaments, Sergei won 2 Gold and 1 Silver medal. He would appear on the cover of Sports Illustrated, becoming one of the first Soviet players to wear an NHL uniform when he joined the New Jersey Devils in 1989 along with his friend and defensive partner from the Soviet team, Viacheslav Fetisov. He made his NHL debut on October 5, 1989.

He lives in New Jersey and currently is an instructor at ProSkate Ice Rink. Sergei currently coaches Barys of the KHL in Kazakhstan. Sergei just signed a one-year deal to be an assistant coach with HC Sibir Novosibirsk, a Russian hockey team in the KHL.

== Career statistics ==
=== Regular season and playoffs ===
| | | | Regular season | | | | | Playoffs |
| Season | Team | League | GP | G | A | Pts | PIM | GP | G | A | Pts | PIM |
|---|---|---|---|---|---|---|---|---|---|---|---|---|
| 1975–76 | Metallurg Chelyabinsk | USSR III | — | — | — | — | — | — | — | — | — | — |
| 1976–77 | Traktor Chelyabinsk | USSR | 35 | 2 | 4 | 6 | 28 | — | — | — | — | — |
| 1977–78 | Traktor Chelyabinsk | USSR | 36 | 3 | 5 | 8 | 26 | — | — | — | — | — |
| 1978–79 | Traktor Chelyabinsk | USSR | 44 | 6 | 8 | 14 | 34 | — | — | — | — | — |
| 1979–80 | CSKA Moscow | USSR | 39 | 10 | 8 | 18 | 14 | — | — | — | — | — |
| 1980–81 | CSKA Moscow | USSR | 49 | 4 | 8 | 12 | 26 | — | — | — | — | — |
| 1981–82 | CSKA Moscow | USSR | 40 | 1 | 4 | 5 | 14 | — | — | — | — | — |
| 1982–83 | CSKA Moscow | USSR | 44 | 6 | 14 | 20 | 14 | — | — | — | — | — |
| 1983–84 | CSKA Moscow | USSR | 44 | 11 | 7 | 18 | 20 | — | — | — | — | — |
| 1984–85 | CSKA Moscow | USSR | 40 | 3 | 10 | 13 | 12 | — | — | — | — | — |
| 1985–86 | CSKA Moscow | USSR | 37 | 3 | 2 | 5 | 6 | — | — | — | — | — |
| 1986–87 | CSKA Moscow | USSR | 34 | 4 | 2 | 6 | 8 | — | — | — | — | — |
| 1987–88 | CSKA Moscow | USSR | 38 | 2 | 11 | 13 | 12 | — | — | — | — | — |
| 1988–89 | CSKA Moscow | USSR | 30 | 3 | 3 | 6 | 4 | — | — | — | — | — |
| 1989–90 | New Jersey Devils | NHL | 16 | 0 | 1 | 1 | 8 | — | — | — | — | — |
| 1989–90 | Utica Devils | AHL | 43 | 8 | 11 | 19 | 14 | 4 | 0 | 3 | 3 | 0 |
| 1990–91 | Utica Devils | AHL | 51 | 2 | 7 | 9 | 26 | — | — | — | — | — |
| 1991–92 | San Diego Gulls | IHL | 70 | 7 | 31 | 38 | 42 | 4 | 0 | 0 | 0 | 0 |
| 1992–93 | San Diego Gulls | IHL | 42 | 0 | 9 | 9 | 12 | — | — | — | — | — |
| USSR totals | | | 510 | 58 | 86 | 144 | 218 | — | — | — | — | — |

=== International ===
| Year | Team | Event | GP | G | A | Pts | PIM |
|---|---|---|---|---|---|---|---|
| 1976 | Soviet Union | EJC | 4 | 0 | 0 | 0 | 6 |
| 1977 | Soviet Union | WJC | 7 | 1 | 2 | 3 | 2 |
| 1978 | Soviet Union | WJC | 7 | 1 | 5 | 6 | 2 |
| 1979 | Soviet Union | WC | 1 | 0 | 1 | 1 | 2 |
| 1980 | Soviet Union | OG | 7 | 1 | 6 | 7 | 0 |
| 1983 | Soviet Union | WC | 10 | 1 | 4 | 5 | 0 |
| 1984 | Soviet Union | OG | 7 | 1 | 1 | 2 | 2 |
| 1984 | Soviet Union | CC | 6 | 0 | 3 | 3 | 2 |
| 1985 | Soviet Union | WC | 10 | 0 | 4 | 4 | 2 |
| 1986 | Soviet Union | WC | 10 | 0 | 2 | 2 | 0 |
| 1987 | Soviet Union | WC | 10 | 4 | 2 | 6 | 8 |
| 1988 | Soviet Union | OG | 5 | 0 | 2 | 2 | 4 |
| Junior totals | | | 18 | 2 | 7 | 9 | 10 |
| Senior totals | | | 65 | 7 | 25 | 32 | 20 |
