= Viktor Lyoskin =

Soviet speed skater

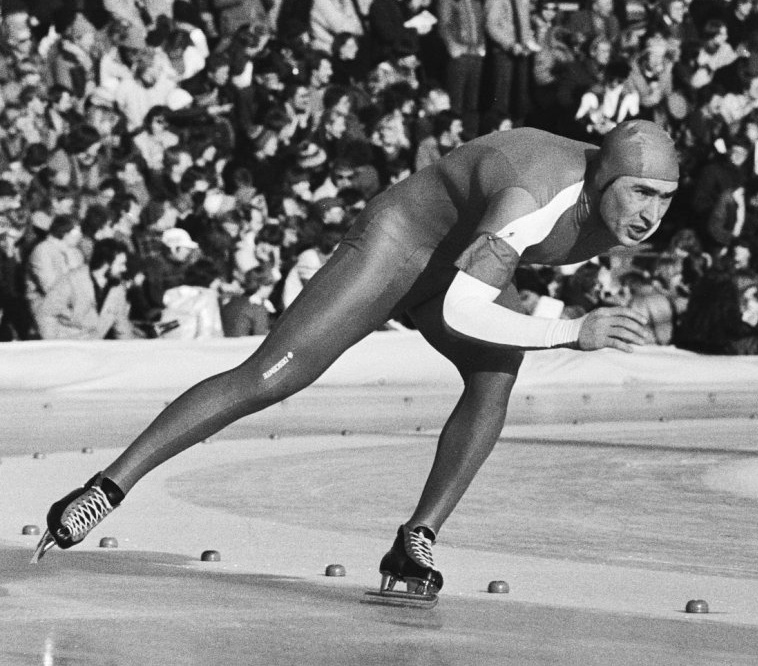
- Lyoskin in 1980

Personal information
- Born: 27 October 1953 Nizhny Novgorod, Russian SFSR, Soviet Union
- Died: 2 May 2002 (aged 48)
- Height: 1.73 m (5 ft 8 in)
- Weight: 75 kg (165 lb)

Sport
- Sport: Speed skating
- Club: Trud

Viktor Lyoskin (Russian: Виктор Лёскин; 27 October 1953 – 2 May 2002) was a Russian speed skater. He competed at the 1980 Winter Olympics in the 5000 m and 10000 m and finished in 11th and 7th place, respectively. On 3 April 1977 he set a new world record on the 10,000 m at the high-altitude rink of Medeo.

Personal bests:

- 500 m – 39.2 (1979)
- 1000 m – 1:19.60 (1977)
- 1500 m – 1:57.26 (1980)
- 5000 m – 7:02.10 (1980)
- 10000 m – 14:34.33 (1977)
