= Alexander Skvortsov (ice hockey) =

Russian ice hockey player (1954–2020)

- Born: August 28, 1954 Gorky, Russian SFSR, Soviet Union
- Died: February 4, 2020 (aged 65) Moscow, Russia
- Height: 5 ft 7 in (170 cm)
- Weight: 190 lb (86 kg; 13 st 8 lb)
- Position: Left wing
- Shot: Left
- Played for: Torpedo Gorky
- National team: Soviet Union
- Playing career: 1975–1994
Medal record
Men's ice hockey
| Gold medal – first place | 1984 Sarajevo | Team |
| Silver medal – second place | 1980 Lake Placid | Team |

Alexander Vikentyevich Skvortsov (Russian: Александр Викентьевич Скворцов) (August 28, 1954 – February 4, 2020) was a Russian ice hockey player who played for the Soviet Union at the Winter Olympics. Skvortsov scored 2 goals during the 1980 games en route to a silver medal, and scored 4 goals in the 1984 games as the Soviets won the gold. He was also a three-time world champion with the Soviet national team.

== Career statistics ==
=== Regular season and playoffs ===
| | | | Regular season | | | | | Playoffs |
| Season | Team | League | GP | G | A | Pts | PIM | GP | G | A | Pts | PIM |
|---|---|---|---|---|---|---|---|---|---|---|---|---|
| 1972–73 | Torpedo Gorky | USSR | 2 | 0 | 0 | 0 | 0 | — | — | — | — | — |
| 1973–74 | Torpedo Gorky | USSR | 19 | 3 | 4 | 7 | 2 | — | — | — | — | — |
| 1974–75 | Torpedo Gorky | USSR | 36 | 13 | 8 | 21 | 2 | — | — | — | — | — |
| 1975–76 | Torpedo Gorky | USSR | 34 | 19 | 12 | 31 | 12 | — | — | — | — | — |
| 1976–77 | Torpedo Gorky | USSR | 36 | 8 | 7 | 15 | 13 | — | — | — | — | — |
| 1977–78 | Torpedo Gorky | USSR | 36 | 19 | 14 | 33 | 30 | — | — | — | — | — |
| 1978–79 | Torpedo Gorky | USSR | 43 | 26 | 21 | 47 | 25 | — | — | — | — | — |
| 1979–80 | Torpedo Gorky | USSR | 44 | 24 | 25 | 49 | 20 | — | — | — | — | — |
| 1980–81 | Torpedo Gorky | USSR | 44 | 19 | 16 | 35 | 10 | — | — | — | — | — |
| 1981–82 | Torpedo Gorky | USSR | 41 | 22 | 15 | 37 | 17 | — | — | — | — | — |
| 1982–83 | Torpedo Gorky | USSR | 44 | 27 | 20 | 47 | 12 | — | — | — | — | — |
| 1983–84 | Torpedo Gorky | USSR | 37 | 18 | 11 | 29 | 21 | — | — | — | — | — |
| 1984–85 | Torpedo Gorky | USSR | 31 | 10 | 9 | 19 | 14 | — | — | — | — | — |
| 1985–86 | Torpedo Gorky | USSR | 34 | 2 | 7 | 9 | 14 | — | — | — | — | — |
| 1986–87 | Torpedo Gorky | USSR | 29 | 8 | 8 | 16 | 10 | — | — | — | — | — |
| 1987–88 | Torpedo Gorky | USSR | 25 | 7 | 14 | 21 | 4 | — | — | — | — | — |
| 1988–89 | Torpedo Gorky | USSR | 24 | 8 | 5 | 13 | 8 | — | — | — | — | — |
| 1989–90 | Kärpät | FIN II | 22 | 20 | 40 | 60 | — | — | — | — | — | — |
| 1991–92 | Kalix HF | SWE III | 19 | 16 | 29 | 45 | 6 | — | — | — | — | — |
| 1992–93 | Kalix HF | SWE III | 24 | 16 | 36 | 52 | 12 | — | — | — | — | — |
| 1993–94 | Kalix HF | SWE III | 23 | 20 | 35 | 55 | 8 | — | — | — | — | — |
| USSR totals | | | 559 | 233 | 196 | 429 | 214 | — | — | — | — | — |

=== International ===
| Year | Team | Event | GP | G | A | Pts | PIM |
|---|---|---|---|---|---|---|---|
| 1976 | Soviet Union | CC | 5 | 0 | 2 | 2 | 0 |
| 1979 | Soviet Union | WC | 7 | 2 | 3 | 5 | 0 |
| 1980 | Soviet Union | OG | 7 | 2 | 5 | 7 | 0 |
| 1981 | Soviet Union | WC | 8 | 4 | 1 | 5 | 2 |
| 1981 | Soviet Union | CC | 7 | 1 | 0 | 1 | 4 |
| 1983 | Soviet Union | WC | 10 | 5 | 1 | 6 | 4 |
| 1984 | Soviet Union | OG | 7 | 4 | 3 | 7 | 0 |
| 1984 | Soviet Union | CC | 6 | 1 | 3 | 4 | 0 |
| 1985 | Soviet Union | WC | 5 | 2 | 0 | 2 | 0 |
| Senior totals | | | 62 | 21 | 18 | 39 | 10 |
