= Vasili Pervukhin =

Russian ice hockey player (born 1956)

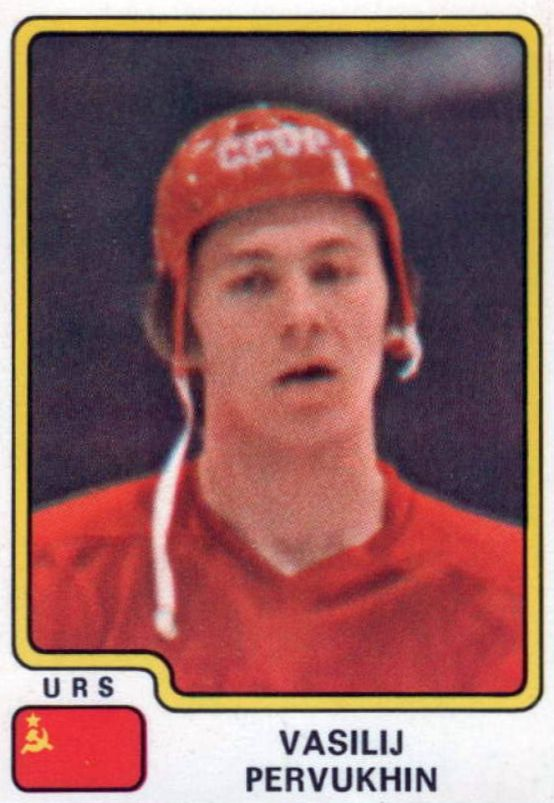
- Born: January 1, 1956 (age 70) Penza, Russian SFSR, Soviet Union
- Height: 5 ft 11 in (180 cm)
- Weight: 202 lb (92 kg; 14 st 6 lb)
- Position: Defence
- Shot: Left
- Played for: HC Dynamo Moscow; PHC Krylya Sovetov; Severstal Cherepovets; Molot-Prikamye Perm
- National team: Soviet Union
- Playing career: 1974–1999
Medal record
Men's ice hockey
Gold medal – first place	1984 Sarajevo	Team
Silver medal – second place	1980 Lake Placid	Team

Vasili Alekseevich Pervukhin (Russian: Василий Алексеевич Первухин) (born January 1, 1956) is a Russian former ice hockey player, who competed for the Soviet Union. At the national level he played for Dizelist Penza between 1974 and 1976, and for HC Dynamo Moscow between 1976 and 1989.

At the Olympics, Pervuhkin earned a silver medal in 1980 and a Gold in 1984.

== Career statistics ==
=== Regular season and playoffs ===
			Regular season					Playoffs
Season	Team	League	GP	G	A	Pts	PIM	GP	G	A	Pts	PIM
1972–73	Dizelist Penza	USSR III	—	0	—	—	—	—	—	—	—	—
1973–74	Dizelist Penza	USSR III	—	3	—	—	—	—	—	—	—	—
1974–75	Dizel Penza	USSR II	34	0	0	0	6	—	—	—	—	—
1975–76	Dizel Penza	USSR II	49	5	9	14	20	—	—	—	—	—
1976–77	Dynamo Moscow	USSR	35	2	6	8	2	—	—	—	—	—
1977–78	Dynamo Moscow	USSR	36	4	7	11	4	—	—	—	—	—
1978–79	Dynamo Moscow	USSR	44	3	19	22	6	—	—	—	—	—
1979–80	Dynamo Moscow	USSR	44	5	10	15	4	—	—	—	—	—
1980–81	Dynamo Moscow	USSR	49	11	4	15	6	—	—	—	—	—
1981–82	Dynamo Moscow	USSR	45	8	12	20	10	—	—	—	—	—
1982–83	Dynamo Moscow	USSR	42	6	11	17	8	—	—	—	—	—
1983–84	Dynamo Moscow	USSR	43	6	9	15	4	—	—	—	—	—
1984–85	Dynamo Moscow	USSR	40	8	13	21	6	—	—	—	—	—
1985–86	Dynamo Moscow	USSR	40	7	8	15	8	—	—	—	—	—
1986–87	Dynamo Moscow	USSR	39	11	13	24	14	—	—	—	—	—
1987–88	Dynamo Moscow	USSR	47	5	4	9	10	—	—	—	—	—
1988–89	Dynamo Moscow	USSR	44	8	10	18	6	—	—	—	—	—
1995–96	Krylya Sovetov Moscow	IHL	29	2	5	7	8	—	—	—	—	—
1996–97	Krylya Sovetov Moscow	RSL	25	2	3	5	4	—	—	—	—	—
1996–97	Severstal Cherepovets	RSL	16	2	2	4	0	3	0	0	0	0
1997–98	Molot-Prikamie Perm	RSL	43	3	12	15	6	—	—	—	—	—
1998–99	Molot-Prikamie Perm	RSL	35	0	10	10	2	4	0	0	0	0
USSR totals			548	84	126	210	88	—	—	—	—	—
RSL totals			119	7	27	34	12	7	0	0	0	0

=== International ===
Year	Team	Event	GP	G	A	Pts	PIM
1974	Soviet Union	WJC	2	0	1	1	0
1974	Soviet Union	EJC	5	0	1	1	2
1975	Soviet Union	WJC	—	0	1	1	—
1975	Soviet Union	EJC	5	0	0	0	0
1976	Soviet Union	WJC	—	1	1	2	—
1977	Soviet Union	WC	10	1	1	2	0
1978	Soviet Union	WC	10	1	2	3	2
1979	Soviet Union	WC	7	0	3	3	0
1980	Soviet Union	OG	7	0	9	9	2
1981	Soviet Union	WC	8	1	3	4	2
1981	Soviet Union	CC	6	0	2	2	6
1982	Soviet Union	WC	10	0	1	1	0
1983	Soviet Union	WC	9	0	1	1	0
1984	Soviet Union	OG	7	0	2	2	0
1984	Soviet Union	CC	6	0	0	0	0
1985	Soviet Union	WC	10	0	1	1	0
1986	Soviet Union	WC	7	1	1	2	4
1987	Soviet Union	WC	7	0	1	1	2
1987	Soviet Union	CC	8	0	2	2	4
Senior totals			112	4	29	33	20
