= Viktor Tikhonov (ice hockey, born 1930) =

Russian ice hockey player (1930–2014)

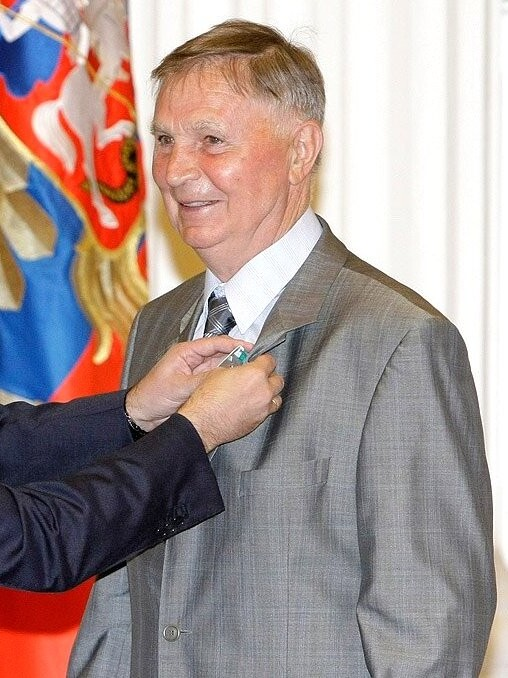
- Tikhonov in July 2010
- Born: 4 June 1930 Moscow, Russian SFSR, Soviet Union
- Died: 24 November 2014 (aged 84) Moscow, Russia
- Position: Defence
- Played for: VVS Moscow; Dynamo Moscow
- National team: Soviet Union
- Playing career: 1949–1963

Viktor Vasilyevich Tikhonov (Russian: Виктор Васильевич Тихонов; 4 June 1930 – 24 November 2014) was a Russian ice hockey player and coach. Tikhonov was a defenceman with VVS Moscow and Dynamo Moscow from 1949 to 1963, winning four national championships. He was the coach of the Soviet team when it was the dominant team in international play, winning eight World Championship gold medals, as well as Olympic gold medals in 1984, 1988 and 1992. Tikhonov also led CSKA Moscow to twelve consecutive league championships. He was named to the IIHF Hall of Fame as a builder in 1998.

== Biography ==
Tikhonov played as a defenceman with the VVS (Team of the Soviet Air Force) and Dynamo Moscow. He scored 35 goals in 296 games in the Soviet elite hockey league from 1949 to 1963. He also played for the Soviet Union national team in 1956. In 1950, he became a Soviet Sports Master. As a player, he won four gold medals of the Soviet national championship (three times with VVS (1951–1953) and once with Dynamo, 1954). He won the USSR Cup in 1952 as a member of VVS.

His coaching career started in 1964 when he became an assistant coach for Dynamo Moscow, then he took the position of the head coach for Dynamo Riga in 1968. In 1973, he was named a Latvian merited sports coach (ZTR SSSR). In 1977, he became the head coach for both CSKA Moscow (Central Sport Club of the Army or the Red Army Club as it was sometimes informally called), and the Soviet National Team. In 1978, he became a Soviet Merited sports coach (ZTR SSSR). He was the Soviet and later the Unified Team and Russian National Team coach until 1994, and the coach for CSKA until 1996.

As coach he won:

- 12 straight Soviet titles (1978–1989)
- World Championship gold in 1978–1979, 1981–1983, 1986, 1989, 1990.
- Olympics gold in 1984, 1988, 1992; silver in 1980.
- 1979 Challenge Cup and 1981 Canada Cup.

Tikhonov was known for his dictatorial coaching style. He exercised nearly absolute control over his players' lives. His teams practiced for 10 to 11 months a year, and were confined to barracks throughout that time. CSKA was a division of the Soviet Army during the Soviet era, and Tikhonov was a colonel. Tikhonov's fear of defections since the late 1980s was supposedly so great that he cut players when he thought they might defect. In 1991, for instance, he cut Pavel Bure, Valeri Zelepukin, Evgeny Davydov, and Vladimir Konstantinov just before the 1991 Canada Cup. All of them had been drafted by NHL teams, and Tikhonov might have thought that they might defect if they were allowed to go to the West, just like Alexander Mogilny and Sergei Fedorov. After the dissolution of the Soviet Union, Tikhonov mellowed his style considerably.

After his retirement, Tikhonov lobbied the Russian government for more attention and better financing for the national team.

Tikhonov was hospitalized in late October 2014 and died after a long illness in Moscow on 24 November 2014, at the age of 84.

== Personal life ==
Viktor's son Vasily was also a professional ice hockey coach, who worked in Finland, the United States and Switzerland but moved back to Russia to live with his family. Vasily died in a fall from the window of his Moscow apartment in August 2013.

Viktor's grandson, also named Viktor Tikhonov, was chosen to join Team Russia at the 2007 Super Series against Team Canada after Game Four of the eight-game-series was completed. On 20 June 2008, Tikhonov was selected by the Phoenix Coyotes in the first round, 28th overall, of the 2008 NHL entry draft. After four seasons playing for SKA Saint Petersburg of the Kontinental Hockey League, Tikhonov signed a one-year contract with the Chicago Blackhawks of the National Hockey League in 2015.

== Honours and awards ==
- Order For Merit to the Fatherland, 3rd class (20 December 1996) – for services to the State and outstanding contribution to the development of national hockey
- Order of Honour (3 June 2000) – for outstanding contribution to the development of national hockey
- Order of Friendship (June 2010) – for outstanding contribution to the development of national sport
- Order of Lenin (1983)
- Order of the October Revolution (1988)
- Order of the Red Banner of Labour (1978)
- Order of Friendship of Peoples (1981)
- Medal "For Distinguished Labour" (1999)
- Medal "For Military Valour", 1st class
- Chevalier of the Olympic Order
- IIHF Hall of Fame (1998)
