= Yuri Lebedev (ice hockey) =

Russian ice hockey player (born 1951)

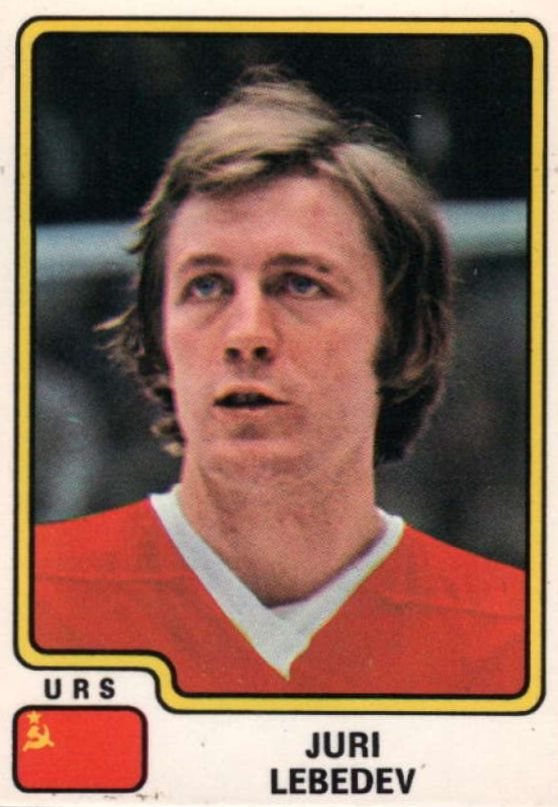
- Born: March 1, 1951 (age 75) Moscow, Russian SFSR, Soviet Union
- Height: 5 ft 10 in (178 cm)
- Weight: 172 lb (78 kg; 12 st 4 lb)
- Position: Right wing
- Shot: Left
- Played for: CSKA Moscow; Krylia Sovetov; Hamburger SV
- National team: Soviet Union
- Playing career: 1969–1985
Medal record
Men's ice hockey
| Silver medal – second place | 1980 Lake Placid | Team |
World Championships
| Gold medal – first place | 1973 Soviet Union |
| Gold medal – first place | 1974 Finland |
| Gold medal – first place | 1975 West Germany |
| Gold medal – first place | 1978 Czechoslovakia |
| Gold medal – first place | 1979 Soviet Union |
| Gold medal – first place | 1981 Sweden |

Yuri Vasilievich Lebedev (Russian: Юрий Васильевич Лебедев) (born March 1, 1951) is a former Russian hockey player, who competed for the Soviet Union. He scored a hat trick against the Netherlands during the 1980 Winter Olympic games.
