= Alexander Golikov =

Russian ice hockey player

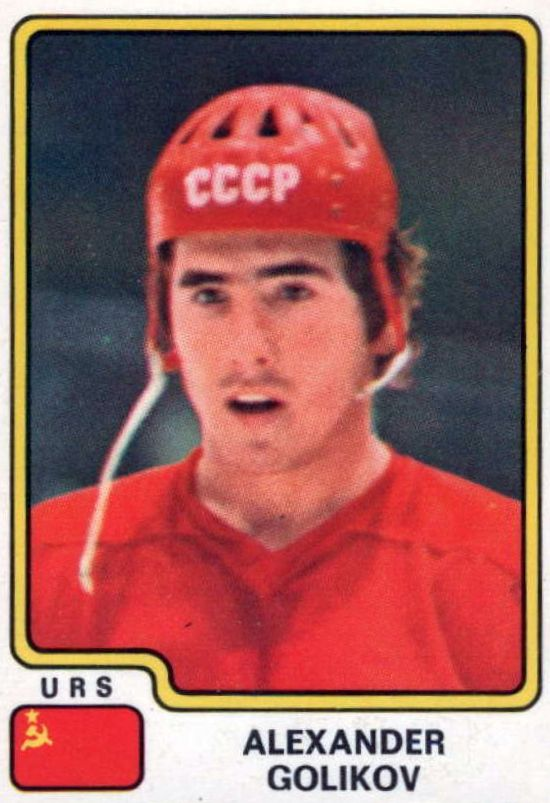
- Born: November 26, 1952 (age 73) Penza, Russian SFSR, USSR
- Height: 5 ft 11 in (180 cm)
- Weight: 174 lb (79 kg; 12 st 6 lb)
- Position: Forward
- Shot: Right
- Played for: Khimik Voskresensk; Dynamo Moscow
- National team: Soviet Union
- Playing career: 1973–1984
Medal record
Men's ice hockey
Olympic Games
| Silver medal – second place | 1980 Lake Placid | Team |
World Championships
| Silver medal – second place | 1976 Poland |
| Bronze medal – third place | 1977 Austria |
| Gold medal – first place | 1978 Czechoslovakia |
| Gold medal – first place | 1979 Soviet Union |

Aleksandr Nikolayevich Golikov (Russian: Александр Николаевич Голиков; born November 26, 1952) is a Russian former ice hockey player.

Golikov played in the Soviet Championship League for Khimik Voskresensk and Dynamo Moscow. He also played for the Soviet Union national ice hockey team and was a member of the 1980 Winter Olympics team in Lake Placid, winning a silver medal. He was the top Soviet goal scorer at the games, scoring a hat trick in the first game against Japan.

He often played alongside his younger brother Vladimir Golikov who also played in the 1980 Olympics for the Soviet Union.

== International statistics ==
| Year | Team | Event | GP | G | A | Pts | PIM |
|---|---|---|---|---|---|---|---|
| 1976 | Soviet Union | WC | 9 | 3 | 3 | 6 | 0 |
| 1976 | Soviet Union | CC | 2 | 0 | 1 | 1 | 2 |
| 1977 | Soviet Union | WC | 4 | 0 | 0 | 0 | 0 |
| 1978 | Soviet Union | WC | 10 | 4 | 4 | 8 | 4 |
| 1979 | Soviet Union | WC | 8 | 5 | 7 | 12 | 2 |
| 1980 | Soviet Union | OLY | 7 | 7 | 6 | 13 | 6 |
| Senior totals | | | 40 | 19 | 21 | 40 | 14 |
