= 1983–84 Soviet League season =

Soviet ice hockey season

The 1983–84 Soviet Championship League season was the 38th season of the Soviet Championship League, the top level of ice hockey in the Soviet Union. 12 teams participated in the league, and CSKA Moscow won the championship.

== Standings ==
	Club	GP	W	T	L	GF	GA	Pts
1.	CSKA Moscow	44	43	0	1	286	80	86
2.	Spartak Moscow	44	26	6	12	214	150	58
3.	Khimik Voskresensk	44	26	5	13	176	159	57
4.	Dynamo Moscow	44	24	8	12	172	109	56
5.	Sokol Kiev	44	20	6	18	156	142	46
6.	Torpedo Gorky	44	18	7	19	139	145	43
7.	Krylya Sovetov Moscow	44	19	5	20	142	141	43
8.	Dinamo Riga	44	17	8	19	146	172	42
9.	Traktor Chelyabinsk	44	15	7	22	103	131	37
10.	SKA Leningrad	44	14	4	26	133	158	32
11.	Izhstal Izhevsk	44	7	4	33	100	216	18
12.	Sibir Novosibirsk	44	5	0	39	107	261	10
