= Norway at the 1980 Winter Olympics =

- IOC code: NOR
- NOC: Norwegian Olympic Committee

in Lake Placid
- Competitors: 64 (55 men, 9 women) in 7 sports
- Flag bearer: Jan Egil Storholt (Speed skating)
- Medals Ranked 8th: Gold 1 Silver 3 Bronze 6 Total 10

Winter Olympics appearances (overview)
- 1924; 1928; 1932; 1936; 1948; 1952; 1956; 1960; 1964; 1968; 1972; 1976; 1980; 1984; 1988; 1992; 1994; 1998; 2002; 2006; 2010; 2014; 2018; 2022; 2026

Norway competed at the 1980 Winter Olympics in Lake Placid, United States.

== Medalists ==
Medal	Name	Sport	Event
Gold	Bjørg Eva Jensen	Speed skating	Women's 3000m
Silver	Lars-Erik Eriksen; Per Knut Aaland; Ove Aunli; Oddvar Brå	Cross-country skiing	Men's 4 × 10 km relay
Silver	Kay Arne Stenshjemmet	Speed skating	Men's 1500m
Silver	Kay Arne Stenshjemmet	Speed skating	Men's 5000m
Bronze	Ove Aunli	Cross-country skiing	Men's 15 km (classical)
Bronze	Brit Pettersen; Anette Bøe; Marit Myrmæl; Berit Aunli	Cross-country skiing	Women's 4 × 5 km relay
Bronze	Frode Rønning	Speed skating	Men's 1000m
Bronze	Terje Andersen	Speed skating	Men's 1500m
Bronze	Tom Erik Oxholm	Speed skating	Men's 5000m
Bronze	Tom Erik Oxholm	Speed skating	Men's 10,000m

== Alpine skiing ==
Men

Athlete	Event	Race 1		Race 2		Total	
Athlete	Event	Time	Rank	Time	Rank	Time	Rank
Arnt Erik Dale	Downhill					1:49.26	19
Erik Håker	Downhill					1:49.09	17
Paul Arne Skajem	Giant Slalom	1:23.12	30	1:23.99	23	2:47.11	24
Odd Sørli	Giant Slalom	1:22.87	26	1:24.43	26	2:47.30	25
Jarle Halsnes	Giant Slalom	1:21.64	12	1:22.85	14	2:44.49	11
Knut Erik Johannessen	Slalom	DNF	–	–	–	DNF	–
Odd Sørli	Slalom	56.93	23	54.43	22	1:51.36	20
Jarle Halsnes	Slalom	56.44	19	53.69	18	1:50.13	16
Paul Arne Skajem	Slalom	55.11	12	52.10	11	1:47.21	11

Women

Athlete	Event	Race 1		Race 2		Total	
Athlete	Event	Time	Rank	Time	Rank	Time	Rank
Torill Fjeldstad	Downhill					1:39.69	7
Torill Fjeldstad	Giant Slalom	1:18.26	20	1:31.40	24	2:49.66	22
Torill Fjeldstad	Slalom	DNF	–	–	–	DNF	–

== Biathlon ==
Men

Event	Athlete	Misses ^{1}	Time	Rank
10 km Sprint	Terje Krokstad	4	35:15.40	17
10 km Sprint	Odd Lirhus	2	34:10.39	7
10 km Sprint	Kjell Søbak	1	33:34.64	5

Event	Athlete	Time	Penalties	Adjusted time ^{2}	Rank
20 km	Odd Lirhus	1'07:39.41	8	1'15:39.41	23
20 km	Sigleif Johansen	1'11:20.12	2	1'13:20.12	13
20 km	Svein Engen	1'08:30.25	3	1'11:30.25	4

Men's 4 x 7.5 km relay

Athletes	Race		
Athletes	Misses ^{1}	Time	Rank
Svein Engen; Kjell Søbak; Odd Lirhus; Sigleif Johansen	3	1'38:11.76	4

^{1} A penalty loop of 150 metres had to be skied per missed target.
^{2} One minute added per close miss (a hit in the outer ring), two minutes added per complete miss.

== Cross-country skiing ==
Men

Event	Athlete	Race	
Event	Athlete	Time	Rank
15 km	Tore Gullen	44:42.73	30
15 km	Lars-Erik Eriksen	43:11.51	10
15 km	Oddvar Brå	43:05.64	9
15 km	Ove Aunli	42:28.62	3rd place, bronze medalist(s)
30 km	Per Knut Aaland	1'31:26.58	16
30 km	Oddvar Brå	1'30:46.70	12
30 km	Lars-Erik Eriksen	1'30:34.34	10
30 km	Ove Aunli	1'29:54.02	8
50 km	Kjell Jakob Sollie	2'38:06.07	24
50 km	Anders Bakken	2'35:33.26	15
50 km	Oddvar Brå	2'31:46.83	7
50 km	Lars-Erik Eriksen	2'30:53.03	4

Men's 4 × 10 km relay

Athletes	Race	
Athletes	Time	Rank
Lars-Erik Eriksen; Per Knut Aaland; Ove Aunli; Oddvar Brå	1'58:45.77	2nd place, silver medalist(s)

Women

Event	Athlete	Race	
Event	Athlete	Time	Rank
5 km	Anette Bøe	16:17.35	24
5 km	Brit Pettersen	16:03.58	21
5 km	Marit Myrmæl	15:58.11	18
5 km	Berit Aunli	15:48.93	14
10 km	Hege Peikli	34:05.03	37
10 km	Hilde Riis	33:08.68	30
10 km	Marit Myrmæl	32:25.14	20
10 km	Berit Aunli	31:46.11	13

Women's 4 × 5 km relay

Athletes	Race	
Athletes	Time	Rank
Brit Pettersen; Anette Bøe; Marit Myrmæl; Berit Aunli	1'04:13.50	3rd place, bronze medalist(s)

== Ice hockey ==
=== First round - Blue Division ===
Team advanced to the Final Round
Team advanced to Consolation Round

Team	GP	W	L	T	GF	GA	Pts
Sweden	5	4	0	1	26	7	9
United States	5	4	0	1	25	10	9
Czechoslovakia	5	3	2	0	34	16	6
Romania	5	1	3	1	13	29	3
West Germany	5	1	4	0	21	30	2
Norway	5	0	4	1	9	36	1

All times are local (UTC-5).

12 February 1980; 13:16	Czechoslovakia	11 – 0 (0–0, 5–0, 6–0)	Norway	Olympic Arena, Lake Placid

Referee:
(Finland) Karl-Gustav Kaisla

Pouzar (Lukáč, Fryčer) - 25:33	1 – 0
Nový (Lukáč, Chalupa) - 31:11	2 – 0
M. Šťastný (P. Šťastný) - 33:00	3 – 0
Martinec (Chalupa, Novák) - 34:13	4 – 0
Ebermann (Novák, Chalupa) (PP) - 38:01	5 – 0
Pouzar (Nový, Lukáč) - 42:13	6 – 0
A. Šťastný (P. Šťastný, Ďuriš) - 43:16	7 – 0
Ebermann (Dvořák, Martinec) (PP) - 45:54	8 – 0
P. Šťastný (Bubla, M. Šťastný) - 48:33	9 – 0
Nový (Kadlec, Lukáč) - 52:51	10 – 0
P. Šťastný (M. Šťastný) - 54:47	11 – 0

10 min
Penalties
10 min
44
Shots
10

14 February 1980; 13:30	Norway	4 – 10 (2–5, 1–3, 1–2)	West Germany	Olympic Fieldhouse, Lake Placid

Referee:
Dombrovski

Andresen (M. Johansen) - 6:03	1 – 0
	1 – 1	07:51 - Vacatko (Kuhl, Reil)
	1 – 2	08:49 - Kiessling (Truntschka, Meitinger)
	1 – 3	09:08 - Zach (Scharf, M. Hinterstocker)
	1 – 4	09:33 - Kretschmer (M. Hinterstocker, H. Hinterstocker)
	1 – 5	10:18 - Höfner (Reindl)
Falk Nilsen (Myhre) - 12:13	2 – 5
V. Johansen (Myhre) - 25:26	3 – 5
	3 – 6	30:52 - Truntschka (Krüll, Kiessling)
	3 – 7	34:01 - Vacatko (Philipp, Kuhl)
	3 – 8	39:53 - Truntschka (Egen, Meitinger)
	3 – 9	40:42 - Kuhl (Vacatko, Krüll)
	3 – 10	50:49 - Kretschmer (Wild, Scharf)
Sethereng (M. Johansen, Lundenes) - 52:41	4 – 10

13 min
Penalties
15 min
20
Shots
51

16 February 1980; 13:00	United States	5 – 1 (0–1, 3–0, 2–0)	Norway	Olympic Arena, Lake Placid

Referee:
(Finland) Karl-Gustav Kaisla

	0 – 1	04:19 - Myhre (Løsåmoen)
Eruzione (PP) - 20:41	1 – 1
Johnson (Christian, McClanahan) - 24:51	2 – 1
Silk (Pavelich, Morrow) - 33:31	3 – 1
Wells (Silk, Verchota) - 44:28	4 – 1
Morrow (McClanahan, Strobel) - 51:29	5 – 1

16 min
Penalties
18 min
43
Shots
22

18 February 1980; 13:30	Norway	1 – 7 (0–2, 0–4, 1–1)	Sweden	Olympic Fieldhouse, Lake Placid

Referee:
(Czechoslovakia) Vladimir Šubrt

	0 – 1	14:03 - Åhlberg (Näslund)
	0 – 2	16:20 - Åhlberg (Näslund, Holmgren)
	0 – 3	23:48 - Åhlberg (Jonsson) (PP)
	0 – 4	34:08 - Lundqvist (Lückner, Molin)
	0 – 5	36:40 - Norberg (H. Eriksson, Waltin)
	0 – 6	37:09 - Andersson (Lundqvist, Molin)
	0 – 7	43:24 - Näslund (Åhlberg, Weinstock) (PP)
Abrahamsen (Molberg, Foyn) - 51:08	1 – 7

8 min
Penalties
8 min
12
Shots
43

20 February 1980; 13:00	Norway	3 – 3 (1–1, 0–1, 2–1)	Romania	Olympic Arena, Lake Placid

Referee:
(Czechoslovakia) Vladimir Šubrt

Foyn (Myhre, Falk Nilsen) (PP) - 00:56	1 – 0
	1 – 1	05:10 - Costea (E. Antal, Tureanu)
	1 – 2	31:27 - Gall (E. Antal, Axinte)
	1 – 3	52:43 - Tureanu (Gall)
Sethereng (Falk Nilsen, Molberg) (PP) - 58:39	2 – 3
Molberg (Myhre, Nilsen) - 59:31	3 – 3

26 min
Penalties
18 min
24
Shots
29

- Team roster

- Jim Marthinsen
- Thore Wålberg
- Nils Nilsen
- Thor Martinsen
- Trond Abrahamsen
- Rune Molberg
- Øivind Løsåmoen
- Erik Pedersen
- Øystein Jarlsbo
- Håkon Lundenes
- Geir Myhre
- Morten Johansen
- Morten Sethereng
- Knut Andresen
- Tore Falch Nilsen
- Tom Røymark
- Vidar Johansen
- Petter Thoresen
- Knut Fjeldsgaard
- Stephen Foyn

- Head coach: Ronald Pettersson

== Nordic combined ==
Events:

- normal hill ski jumping (Three jumps, best two counted and shown here.)
- 15 km cross-country skiing

Athlete	Event	Ski Jumping				Cross-country			Total	
Athlete	Event	Distance 1	Distance 2	Points	Rank	Time	Points	Rank	Points	Rank
Arne Morten Granlien	Individual	70.0	69.5	158.5	30	DNF	–	–	DNF	–
Hallstein Bøgseth	Individual	76.5	83.5	203.8	8	50:29.9	195.190	19	398.990	11
Odd Arne Engh	Individual	79.0	79.5	199.9	12	57:56.2	128.245	29	328.145	29
Tom Sandberg	Individual	81.0	78.0	203.7	9	48:19.4	214.765	5	418.465	4

== Ski jumping ==
Athlete	Event	Jump 1		Jump 2		Total	
Athlete	Event	Distance	Points	Distance	Points	Points	Rank
Ivar Mobekk	Normal hill	74.0	97.6	80.5	111.0	208.6	27
Per Bergerud	Normal hill	80.0	110.7	81.0	113.3	224.0	18
Roger Ruud	Normal hill	81.0	113.3	84.5	120.9	234.2	13
Johan Sætre	Normal hill	83.0	118.0	81.0	113.8	231.8	14
Johan Sætre	Large hill	97.0	102.0	95.0	100.2	202.2	31
Ivar Mobekk	Large hill	99.0	102.8	102.5	109.7	212.5	24
Per Bergerud	Large hill	108.0	120.9	98.0	103.9	224.8	16
Roger Ruud	Large hill	110.0	122.7	109.0	120.3	243.0	6

== Speed skating ==
Men

Event	Athlete	Race	
Event	Athlete	Time	Rank
500 m	Kai Arne Engelstad	39.30	16
500 m	Jarle Pedersen	38.83	6
500 m	Frode Rønning	38.66	4
1000 m	Jan Egil Storholt	1:19.34	17
1000 m	Terje Andersen	1:18.52	12
1000 m	Frode Rønning	1:16.91	3rd place, bronze medalist(s)
1500 m	Jan Egil Storholt	1:57.95	6
1500 m	Terje Andersen	1:56.92	3rd place, bronze medalist(s)
1500 m	Kay Arne Stenshjemmet	1:56.81	2nd place, silver medalist(s)
5000 m	Øyvind Tveter	7:08.36	5
5000 m	Tom Erik Oxholm	7:05.59	3rd place, bronze medalist(s)
5000 m	Kay Arne Stenshjemmet	7:03.28	2nd place, silver medalist(s)
10,000 m	Alf Rekstad	15:05.70	13
10,000 m	Øyvind Tveter	14:43.53	5
10,000 m	Tom Erik Oxholm	14:36.60	3rd place, bronze medalist(s)

Women

Event	Athlete	Race	
Event	Athlete	Time	Rank
1000 m	Bjørg Eva Jensen	1:28.55	12
1500 m	Lisbeth Korsmo-Berg	2:15.63	14
1500 m	Bjørg Eva Jensen	2:12.59	4
3000 m	Lisbeth Korsmo-Berg	4:54.95	20
3000 m	Bjørg Eva Jensen	4:32.13 OR	1st place, gold medalist(s)
