= West Germany at the 1980 Winter Olympics =

- Flag of Germany
- IOC code: FRG
- NOC: National Olympic Committee for Germany

in Lake Placid
- Competitors: 80 (61 men, 19 women) in 10 sports
- Flag bearer: Urban Hettich (Nordic combined)
- Medals Ranked 12th: Gold 0 Silver 2 Bronze 3 Total 5

Winter Olympics appearances (overview)
- 1968; 1972; 1976; 1980; 1984; 1988

Other related appearances
- Germany (1928–1936, 1952, 1992–pres.); United Team of Germany (1956–1964)

West Germany (Federal Republic of Germany) competed at the 1980 Winter Olympics in Lake Placid, United States.

== Medalists ==
Medal	Name	Sport	Event
Silver	Irene Epple	Alpine skiing	Women's giant slalom
Silver	Christa Kinshofer-Güthlein	Alpine skiing	Women's slalom
Bronze	Franz Bernreiter; Hans Estner; Peter Angerer; Gerd Winkler	Biathlon	Men's 4 x 7.5 km relay
Bronze	Dagmar Lurz	Figure skating	Women's singles
Bronze	Anton Winkler	Luge	Men's individual

== Alpine skiing ==
Men

Athlete	Event	Race 1		Race 2		Total	
Athlete	Event	Time	Rank	Time	Rank	Time	Rank
Michael Veith	Downhill					1:50.00	23
Sepp Ferstl	Giant Slalom	1:25.86	39	1:27.17	34	2:53.03	34
Albert Burger	Giant Slalom	1:22.59	24	1:23.53	19	2:46.12	20
Frank Wörndl	Giant Slalom	1:21.70	13	1:23.88	22	2:45.58	17
Sepp Ferstl	Slalom	1:01.77	30	57.53	25	1:59.30	25
Albert Burger	Slalom	56.98	24	DSQ	–	DSQ	–
Frank Wörndl	Slalom	55.30	13	51.89	10	1:47.19	10
Christian Neureuther	Slalom	54.37	5	50.77	3	1:45.14	5

Women

Athlete	Event	Race 1		Race 2		Total	
Athlete	Event	Time	Rank	Time	Rank	Time	Rank
Monika Bader	Downhill					1:41.96	21
Irene Epple	Downhill					1:41.68	19
Evi Mittermaier	Downhill					1:41.26	17
Marianne Zechmeister	Downhill					1:39.96	9
Regine Mösenlechner	Giant Slalom	1:17.70	16	DNF	–	DNF	–
Maria Epple	Giant Slalom	1:16.20	8	1:29.36	11	2:45.56	8
Christa Kinshofer-Güthlein	Giant Slalom	1:15.19	3	1:27.44	5	2:42.63	5
Irene Epple	Giant Slalom	1:14.75	2	1:27.37	4	2:42.12	2nd place, silver medalist(s)
Regine Mösenlechner	Slalom	DNF	–	–	–	DNF	–
Pamela Behr	Slalom	DNF	–	–	–	DNF	–
Irene Epple	Slalom	45.14	15	DNF	–	DNF	–
Christa Kinshofer-Güthlein	Slalom	42.74	2	43.76	2	1:26.50	2nd place, silver medalist(s)

== Biathlon ==
Men

Event	Athlete	Misses ^{1}	Time	Rank
10 km Sprint	Fritz Fischer	4	36:29.87	27
10 km Sprint	Gerd Winkler	1	34:24.16	10
10 km Sprint	Peter Angerer	4	34:13.43	8

Event	Athlete	Time	Penalties	Adjusted time ^{2}	Rank
20 km	Gerd Winkler	1'10:48.57	7	1'17:48.57	30
20 km	Alois Kanamüller	1'11:34.80	6	1'17:34.80	29
20 km	Peter Angerer	1'08:07.60	8	1'16:07.60	27

Men's 4 x 7.5 km relay

Athletes	Race		
Athletes	Misses ^{1}	Time	Rank
Franz Bernreiter; Hans Estner; Peter Angerer; Gerd Winkler	2	1'37:30.26	3rd place, bronze medalist(s)

^{1}A penalty loop of 150 metres had to be skied per missed target.
^{2}One minute added per close miss (a hit in the outer ring), two minutes added per complete miss.

== Bobsleigh ==
Sled	Athletes	Event	Run 1		Run 2		Run 3		Run 4		Total	
Sled	Athletes	Event	Time	Rank	Time	Rank	Time	Rank	Time	Rank	Time	Rank
FRG-1	Peter Hell; Heinz Busche	Two-man	1:03.87	12	1:03.63	7	1:02.91	4	1:03.33	7	4:13.74	8
FRG-2	Georg Großmann; Alexander Wernsdorfer	Two-man	1:03.50	7	1:04.93	20	1:03.85	13	1:03.85	10	4:16.13	12

Sled	Athletes	Event	Run 1		Run 2		Run 3		Run 4		Total	
Sled	Athletes	Event	Time	Rank	Time	Rank	Time	Rank	Time	Rank	Time	Rank
FRG-1	Peter Hell; Hans Wagner; Heinz Busche; Walter Barfuß	Four-man	1:01.14	8	1:01.22	8	1:00.57	8	1:01.47	11	4:04.40	7
FRG-2	Alois Schnorbus; Lothar Pongratz; Jürgen Hofmann; Martin Meinberg	Four-man	1:01.54	14	1:01.47	11	1:00.93	10	1:01.21	8	4:05.15	10

== Cross-country skiing ==
Men

Event	Athlete	Race	
Event	Athlete	Time	Rank
15 km	Dieter Notz	44:54.11	36
15 km	Peter Zipfel	44:38.23	26
15 km	Wolfgang Müller	44:02.54	21
15 km	Jochen Behle	43:16.05	12
30 km	Peter Zipfel	1'36:06.95	40
30 km	Wolfgang Müller	1'35:37.46	37
30 km	Josef Schneider	1'34:05.33	31
30 km	Dieter Notz	1'31:58.27	22
50 km	Josef Schneider	2'40:49.68	29
50 km	Franz Schöbel	2'40:25.96	28
50 km	Dieter Notz	2'37:47.41	22
50 km	Peter Zipfel	2'37:09.74	21

Men's 4 × 10 km relay

Athletes	Race	
Athletes	Time	Rank
Peter Zipfel; Wolfgang Müller; Dieter Notz; Jochen Behle	2'00:22.74	4

Women

Event	Athlete	Race	
Event	Athlete	Time	Rank
5 km	Karin Jäger	16:38.47	32
5 km	Susi Riermeier	16:31.07	31
10 km	Karin Jäger	33:01.76	26
10 km	Susi Riermeier	32:37.57	21

== Figure skating ==
Men

Athlete	CF	SP	FS	Points	Places	Rank
Rudi Cerne	15	13	13	159.30	116	13

Women

Athlete	CF	SP	FS	Points	Places	Rank
Christina Riegel	17	19	18	149.50	162	18
Karin Riediger	15	13	11	166.32	120	13
Dagmar Lurz	2	5	6	183.04	28	3rd place, bronze medalist(s)

Pairs

Athletes	SP	FS	Points	Places	Rank
Christina Riegel; Andreas Nischwitz	8	8	131.70	71	8

Ice Dancing

Athletes	CD	FD	Points	Places	Rank
Henriette Fröschl; Christian Steiner	10	10	178.38	94	10

== Ice hockey ==
=== First round - Blue Division ===
Team advanced to the Final Round
Team advanced to Consolation round

Team	GP	W	L	T	GF	GA	Pts
Sweden	5	4	0	1	26	7	9
United States	5	4	0	1	25	10	9
Czechoslovakia	5	3	2	0	34	16	6
Romania	5	1	3	1	13	29	3
West Germany	5	1	4	0	21	30	2
Norway	5	0	4	1	9	36	1

All times are local (UTC-5).

12 February 1980; 16:30	Romania	6 – 4 (1–1, 2–3, 3–0)	West Germany	Olympic Arena, Lake Placid

Referee:
Neagles

Costea (Moroşan) (PP) - 5:15	1 – 0
	1 – 1	11:50 - Vacatko (Philipp, Krüll)
	1 – 2	22:37 - Truntschka (Egen, Kiessling)
Costea (E. Antal, Tureanu) (PP) - 24:46	2 – 2
	2 – 3	26:13 - Vacatko (Kuhl, Philipp)
	2 – 4	35:34 - Egen (Scharf) (PP)
Tureanu (Gall, Costea) - 37:46	3 – 4
Tureanu (Costea) - 44:12	4 – 4
Tureanu (Gall) - 46:30	5 – 4
Olenici - 53:17	6 – 4

16 min
Penalties
16 min
38
Shots
53

14 February 1980; 13:30	Norway	4 – 10 (2–5, 1–3, 1–2)	West Germany	Olympic Fieldhouse, Lake Placid

Referee:
Dombrovski

Andresen (M. Johansen) - 6:03	1 – 0
	1 – 1	07:51 - Vacatko (Kuhl, Reil)
	1 – 2	08:49 - Kiessling (Truntschka, Meitinger)
	1 – 3	09:08 - Zach (Scharf, M. Hinterstocker)
	1 – 4	09:33 - Kretschmer (M. Hinterstocker, H. Hinterstocker)
	1 – 5	10:18 - Höfner (Reindl)
Falk Nilsen (Myhre) - 12:13	2 – 5
V. Johansen (Myhre) - 25:26	3 – 5
	3 – 6	30:52 - Truntschka (Krüll, Kiessling)
	3 – 7	34:01 - Vacatko (Philipp, Kuhl)
	3 – 8	39:53 - Truntschka (Egen, Meitinger)
	3 – 9	40:42 - Kuhl (Vacatko, Krüll)
	3 – 10	50:49 - Kretschmer (Wild, Scharf)
Sethereng (M. Johansen, Lundenes) - 52:41	4 – 10

13 min
Penalties
15 min
20
Shots
51

16 February 1980; 20:00	Sweden	5 – 2 (1–0, 4–1, 0–1)	West Germany	Olympic Arena, Lake Placid

Referee:
Dombrovski

Berglund (Molin, Lundqvist) - 09:52	1 – 0
Näslund (Åhlberg) - 26:50	2 – 0
Lundqvist (Berglund, Samuelsson) - 28:35	3 – 0
Söderström (Åhlberg) - 32:36	4 – 0
Söderström (H. Eriksson) (PP) - 36:03	5 – 0
	5 – 1	37:06 - Egen (Truntschka)
	5 – 2	56:43 - Reil (SH)

24 min
Penalties
31 min
33
Shots
25

18 February 1980; 20:00	West Germany	3 – 11 (1–5, 0–5, 2–1)	Czechoslovakia	Olympic Arena, Lake Placid

Referee:
(Finland) Karl-Gustav Kaisla

	0 – 1	01:33 - Nový (Ebermann) (PP)
	0 – 2	02:28 - P. Šťastný (A. Šťastný, M. Šťastný)
	0 – 3	05:45 - P. Šťastný (M. Šťastný) (SH)
Krüll (Truntschka, Kretschmer) - 19:04	1 – 3
	1 – 4	19:32 - Pouzar (Kaberle, Nový)
	1 – 5	19:49 - A. Šťastný (P. Šťastný)
	1 – 6	22:17 - Nový (Lukáč)
	1 – 7	27:10 - Pouzar (Fryčer, Nový)
	1 – 8	33:30 - Pouzar
	1 – 9	38:36 - Ebermann (Novák)
	1 – 10	39:22 - Nový (Pouzar)
M. Hinterstocker (Zach, Auhuber) - 46:28	2 – 10
Höfner (Kuhl, Philipp) - 48:36	3 – 10
	3 – 11	50:22 - P. Šťastný (M. Šťastný)

20 min
Penalties
19 min
22
Shots
39

20 February 1980; 20:30	West Germany	2 – 4 (2–0, 0–2, 0–2)	United States	Olympic Fieldhouse, Lake Placid

Referee:
Haley

Kretschmer - 01:50	1 – 0
Kiessling (Höfner, Kretschmer) (PP) - 19:45	2 – 0
	2 – 1	27:40 - McClanahan (Johnson, Christian)
	2 – 2	38:31 - Broten (Strobel, Eruzione)
	2 – 3	41:17 - McClanahan (Johnson, Christian)
	2 – 4	44:17 - Verchota (Christian, Wells)

8 min
Penalties
16 min
26
Shots
32

- Team roster

- Bernd Englbrecht
- Sigmund Suttner
- Udo Kiessling
- Harald Krüll
- Klaus Auhuber
- Horst-Peter Kretschmer
- Joachim Reil
- Peter Scharf
- Rainer Philipp
- Franz Reindl
- Martin Hinterstocker
- Uli Egen
- Gerd Truntschka
- Hans Zach
- Hermann Hinterstocker
- Ernst Höfner
- Vladimir Vacatko
- Martin Wild
- Holger Meitinger

- Head coach: Hans Rampf

== Luge ==
Men

Athlete	Run 1		Run 2		Run 3		Run 4		Total	
Athlete	Time	Rank	Time	Rank	Time	Rank	Time	Rank	Time	Rank
Anton Wembacher	44.308	13	44.549	7	44.835	9	44.320	6	2:58.012	8
Gerhard Böhmer	44.010	8	44.741	9	44.305	5	44.584	9	2:57.769	7
Anton Winkler	43.885	7	44.045	5	44.310	6	44.305	4	2:56.545	3rd place, bronze medalist(s)

(Men's) Doubles

Athletes	Run 1		Run 2		Total	
Athletes	Time	Rank	Time	Rank	Time	Rank
Anton Winkler; Anton Wembacher	39.916	6	40.096	5	1:20.012	6
Hans Brandner; Balthasar Schwarm	39.814	4	40.249	7	1:20.063	7

Women

Athlete	Run 1		Run 2		Run 3		Run 4		Total	
Athlete	Time	Rank	Time	Rank	Time	Rank	Time	Rank	Time	Rank
Andrea Fendt	40.234	14	40.458	13	40.215	12	40.848	14	2:43.391	12
Elisabeth Demleitner	39.568	6	39.460	2	39.466	3	39.424	5	2:37.918	4

== Nordic combined ==
Events:

- normal hill ski jumping (Three jumps, best two counted and shown here.)
- 15 km cross-country skiing

Athlete	Event	Ski Jumping				Cross-country			Total	
Athlete	Event	Distance 1	Distance 2	Points	Rank	Time	Points	Rank	Points	Rank
Hermann Weinbuch	Individual	73.5	75.0	187.8	17	50:14.9	197.440	17	385.240	16
Günther Abel	Individual	72.5	78.5	184.9	18	50:53.7	191.620	22	376.520	20
Urban Hettich	Individual	75.0	71.5	174.2	23	48:09.0	216.325	4	390.525	14
Hubert Schwarz	Individual	81.0	84.5	219.6	3	51:54.2	182.545	23	402.145	9

== Ski jumping ==
Athlete	Event	Jump 1		Jump 2		Total	
Athlete	Event	Distance	Points	Distance	Points	Points	Rank
Hubert Schwarz	Normal hill	80.0	113.2	72.0	95.9	209.1	25
Peter Leitner	Normal hill	81.0	114.3	77.5	108.7	223.0	19
Hermann Weinbuch	Large hill	85.0	83.2	80.0	72.2	155.4	48
Hubert Schwarz	Large hill	104.5	115.5	78.0	66.4	181.9	41
Peter Leitner	Large hill	106.0	116.6	98.0	104.9	221.5	18

== Speed skating ==
Men

Event	Athlete	Race	
Event	Athlete	Time	Rank
1000 m	Herbert Schwarz	1:44.23	39
1500 m	Herbert Schwarz	1:59.58	12

Women

Event	Athlete	Race	
Event	Athlete	Time	Rank
500 m	Brigitte Flierl	45.28	28
500 m	Monika Gawenus-Holzner-Pflug	44.59	25
500 m	Sigrid Smuda	44.11	17
1000 m	Brigitte Flierl	1:33.61	33
1000 m	Sigrid Smuda	1:30.29	23
1000 m	Monika Gawenus-Holzner-Pflug	1:30.13	21
1500 m	Sigrid Smuda	2:18.86	22
3000 m	Sigrid Smuda	4:53.55	19
