= 1961 in Norway =

- Centuries: 18th; 19th; 20th; 21st
- Decades: 1940s; 1950s; 1960s; 1970s; 1980s
- See also: List of years in Norway

Events in the year 1961 in Norway.

== Incumbents ==
- Monarch – Olav V.
- Prime Minister – Einar Gerhardsen (Labour Party)

== Events ==
- 12 January – Princess Astrid marries Johan Martin Ferner.
- March – Ingrid Bjerkås, ordained as first female minister in the Church of Norway
- 15 April – The Socialist People's Party was founded.
- 9 August – Holtaheia Accident: A British passenger plane crashes in Strand Municipality in Rogaland. All 39 passengers aboard, including 34 children, are killed.
- 11 September – The 1961 Parliamentary election takes place.

== Notable births ==
=== January ===
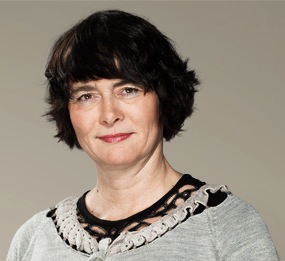
Irene Johansen

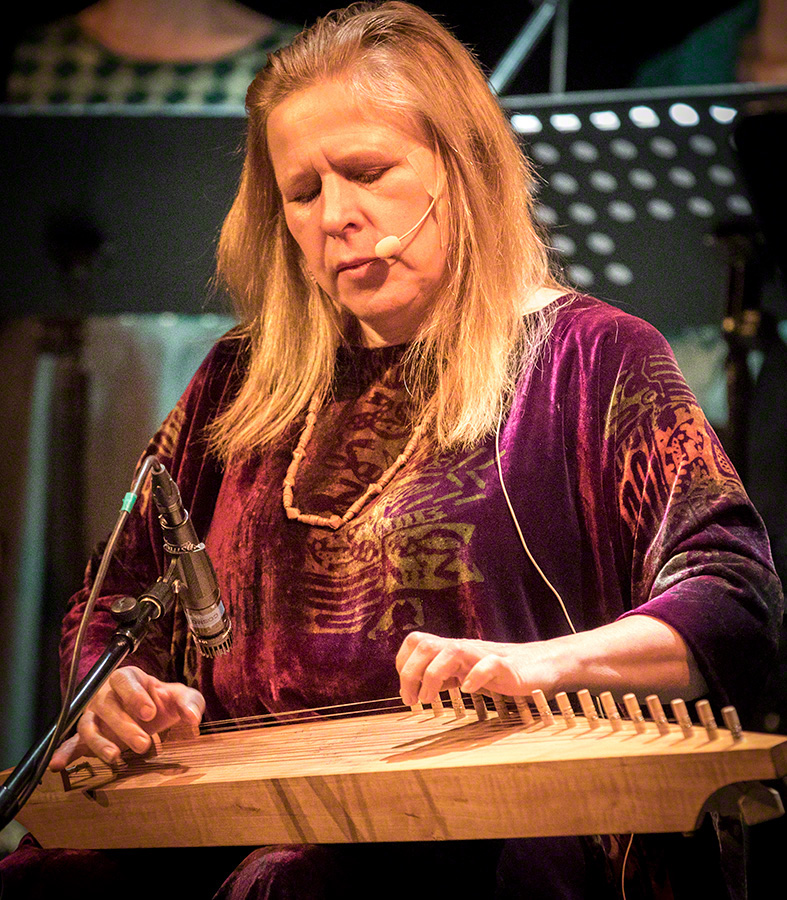
Sinikka Langeland

- 2 January – Ole Bremseth, ski jumper.
- 4 January – Kristin Kloster Aasen, sports leader.
- 5 January – Bjørnar Laabak, politician.
- 7 January – Irene Johansen, politician
- 8 January – Tore Hagebakken, politician.
- 11 January
  - Carl Morten Amundsen, dramaturg and theatre director.
  - Vegard Opaas, ski jumper.
- 13 January – Sinikka Langeland, traditional folk singer and musician.
- 15 January – Guttorm Schjelderup, economist.
- 16 January – Kenneth Sivertsen, guitarist, singer and composer (died 2006).
- 18 January – Linn Siri Jensen, handball goalkeeper and coach.
- 29 January – Per Axel Koch, media executive.

=== February ===
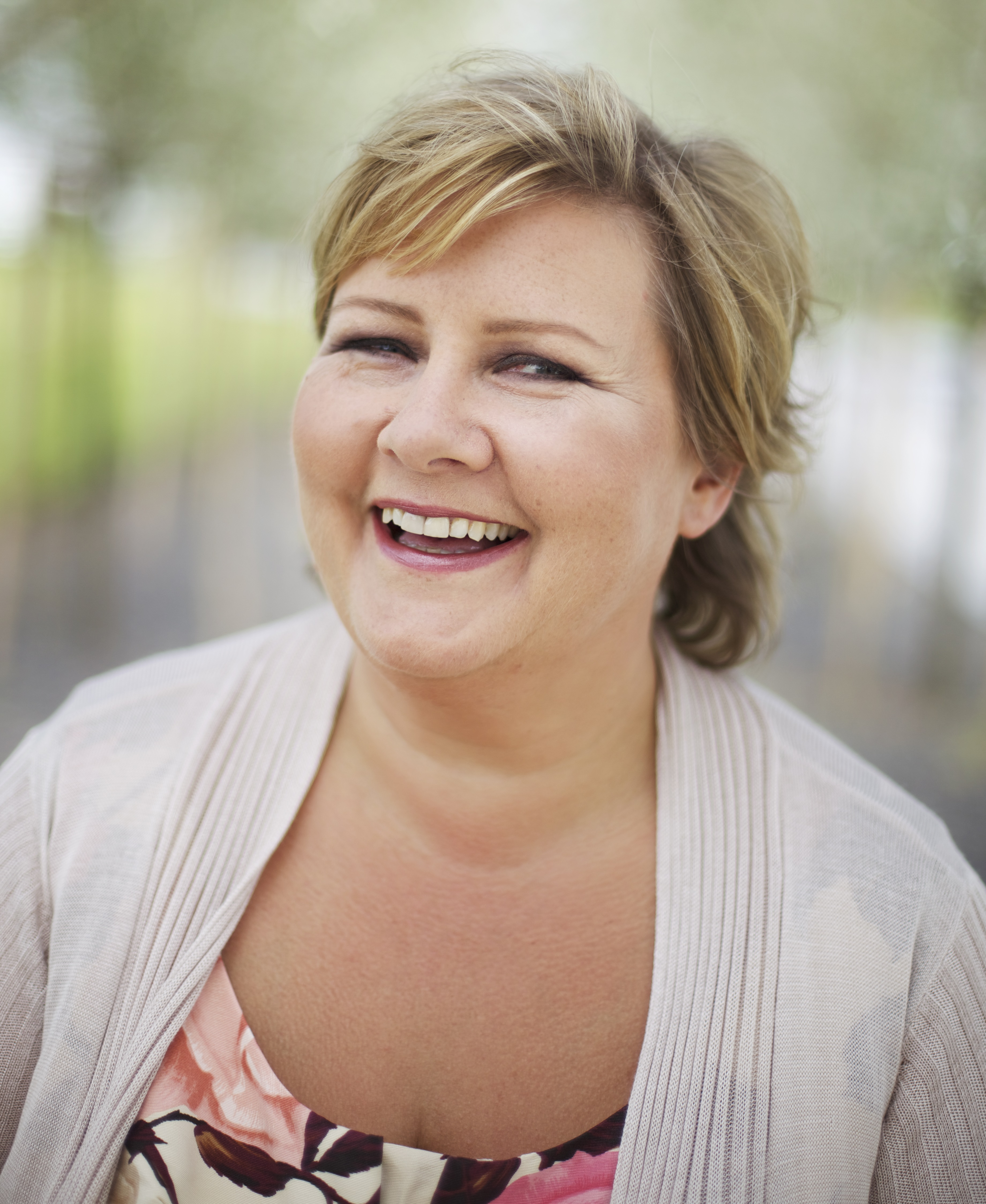
Erna Solberg

- 3 February – Karoline Frogner, filmmaker, photographer and writer.
- 4 February
  - Kristin Midthun, handball player.
  - Kari Veiteberg, bishop.
- 12 February – Knut Reiersrud, blues guitarist.
- 14 February – Raymond Johansen, politician.
- 21 February – Per Arne Olsen, politician.
- 22 February (in Switzerland) – Rolf Thorsen, competition rower.
- 24 February – Erna Solberg, Prime Minister.
- 28 February – Bjørn-Inge Larsen, physician and civil servant.

=== March ===
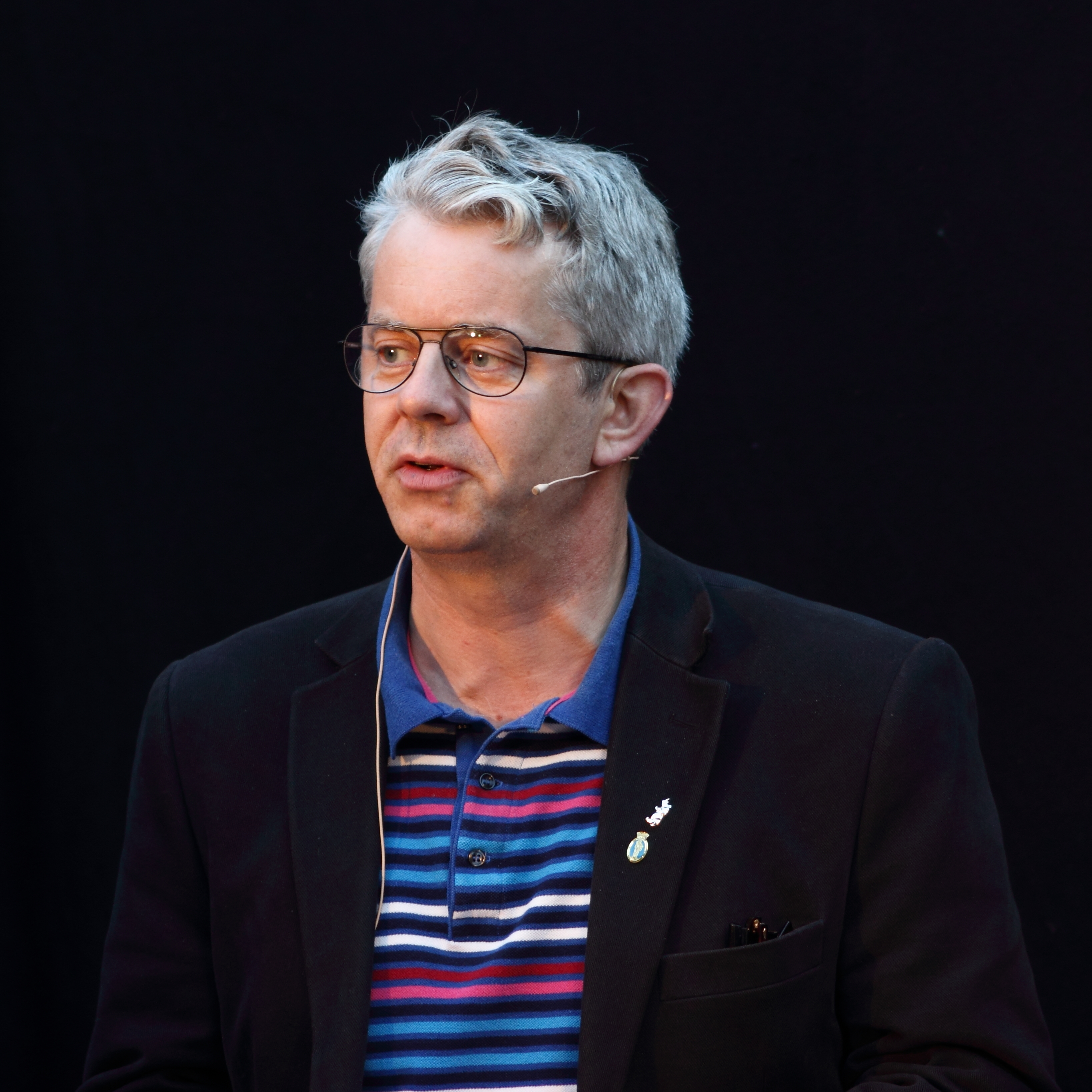
Knut Nærum

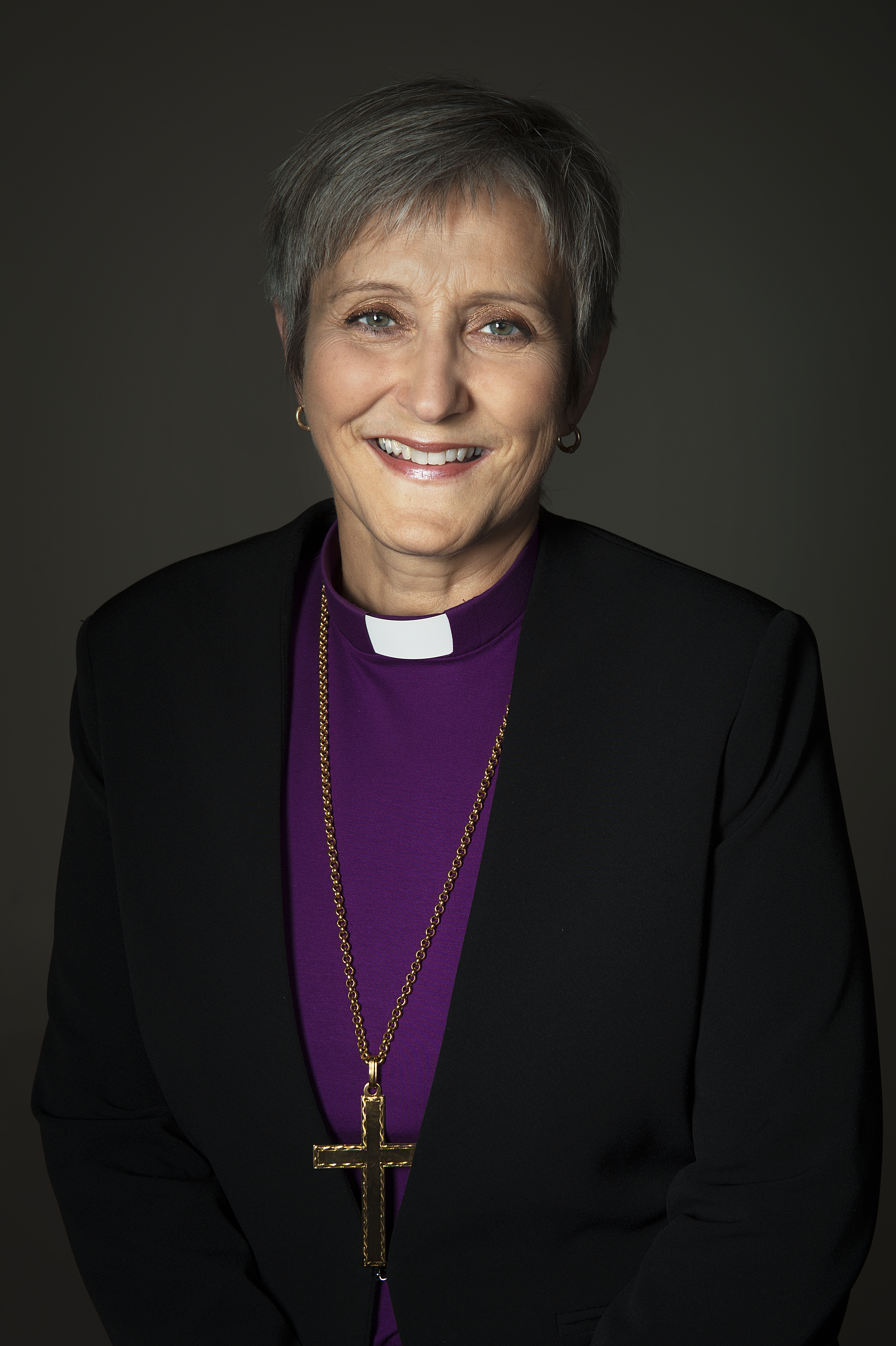
Herborg Finnset

- 3 March
  - Anita Hegerland, singer
  - Knut Nærum, comedian, author and comics writer.
- 6 March – Knut Hjeltnes, architect.
- 7 March – Øystein Jarlsbo, ice hockey player.
- 8 March – Odd W. Surén, writer.
- 12 March – Erik Kristiansen, ice hockey player.
- 18 March
  - Ingvild Bryn, journalist and news anchor
  - Kyrre Nakkim, journalist
- 19 March – Rune Bratseth, footballer.
- 22 March
  - Arne Bergseng, ice hockey player.
  - Bente Pedersen, novelist.
- 23 March
  - Eivind Aarset, guitarist.
  - Jørgen Sigurd Lien, software developer
- 24 March – Henning Warloe, politician.
- 28 March
  - Herborg Finnset, bishop.
  - Åsne Havnelid, businessperson and sports official.
- 30 March – Per Arne Nilsen, sailor.

=== April ===
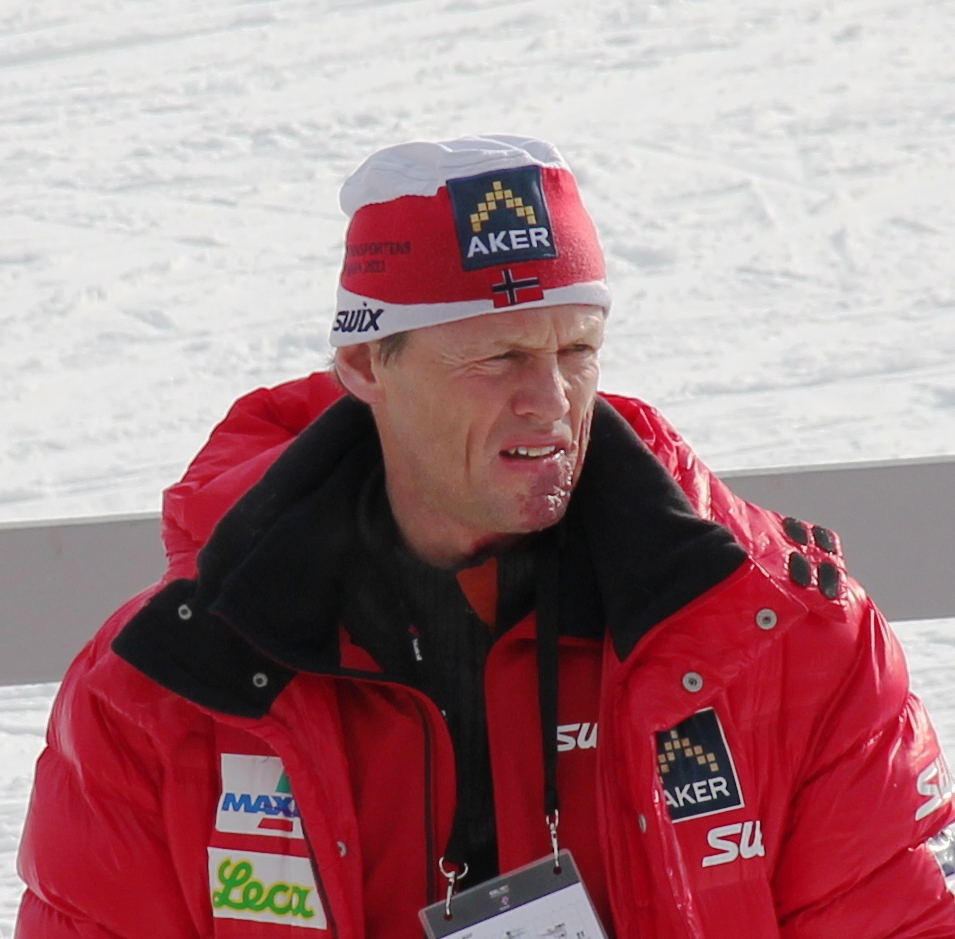
Pål Gunnar Mikkelsplass

- 6 April – Dag Hopen, cyclist.
- 12 April
  - Henry Nilsen, speed skater.
  - Torfinn Opheim, politician.
- 14 April – Hilde Britt Mellbye, businesswoman.
- 22 April – Atle Norstad, bobsledder.
- 25 April – Truls Mørk, cellist.
- 29 April – Pål Gunnar Mikkelsplass, cross-country skier.

=== May ===
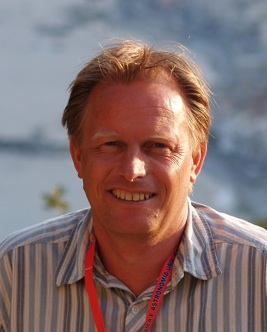
Pål Brekke

- 5 May – Tore Johnsen, athlete.
- 6 May – Geir Bergkastet, cultural director.
- 9 May – Odd Reidar Humlegård, civil servant.
- 12 May – André Krogsæter, footballer.
- 23 May – Pål Brekke, astrophysicist
- 30 May – Erik Thyness, judge.
- 31 May – Ove Lemicka, politician.

=== June ===
- 5 June – Kjetil Osvold, footballer.
- 9 June – Ragnhild Bratberg, orienteering competitor and a cross country skier.
- 21 June – Rolf Morgan Hansen, cyclist.
- 22 June – Asbjørn Schaathun, composer.
- 26 June – Kari Ofstad, canoeist.
- 28 June – Ann-Magrit Austenå, journalist and organizational leader.

=== July ===
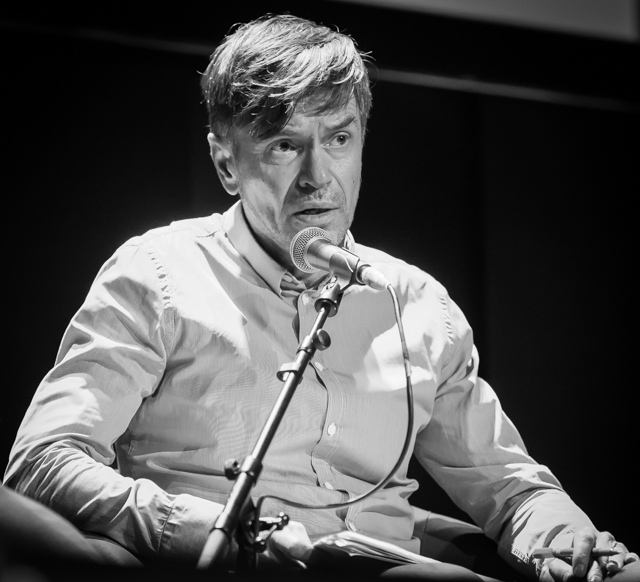
Kjetil Rolness

- 8 July – Karl Seglem, jazz musician.
- 12 July – Espen Andersen, Nordic combined skier.
- 13 July
  - John Hugo Pedersen, ice hockey player.
  - Kjetil Rolness, sociologist and writer.
- 23 July – Akhtar Chaudhry, politician.
- 25 July
  - Johan H. Andresen Jr., industrialist and investor.
  - Petter Thoresen, ice hockey player.

=== August ===
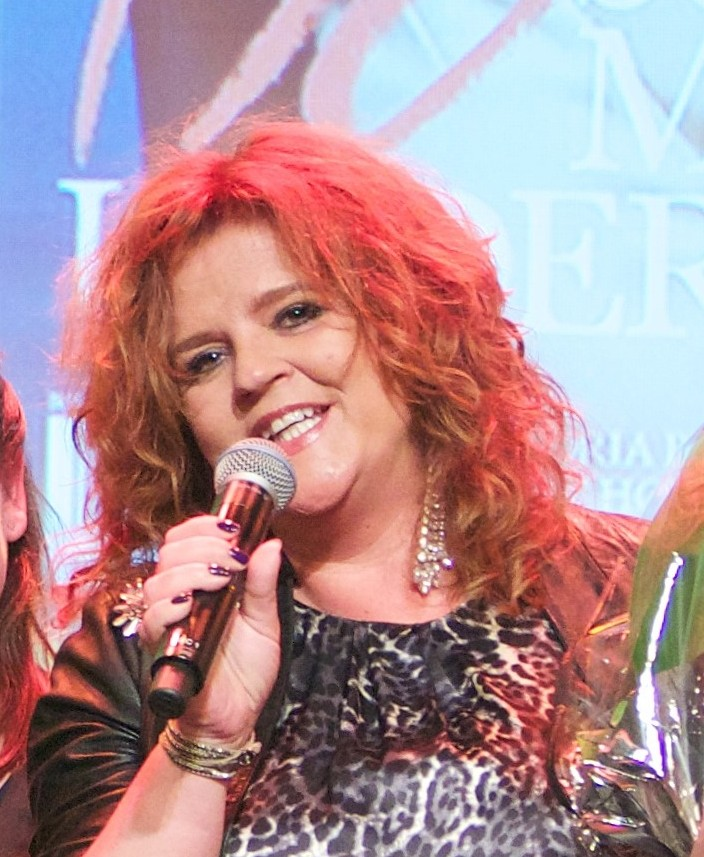
Signy Fardal

- 1 August – Marianne Andreassen, civil servant.
- 12 August
  - Kristin Krohn Devold, politician.
  - Ingrid Heggø, politician.
- 19 August – Frank Vestreng, ice hockey player.
- 27 August
  - Anders Giæver, journalist.
  - Margit Tveiten, diplomat.
- 28 August – Kim Leine, writer.
- 29 August – Signy Fardal, magazine editor.

=== September ===
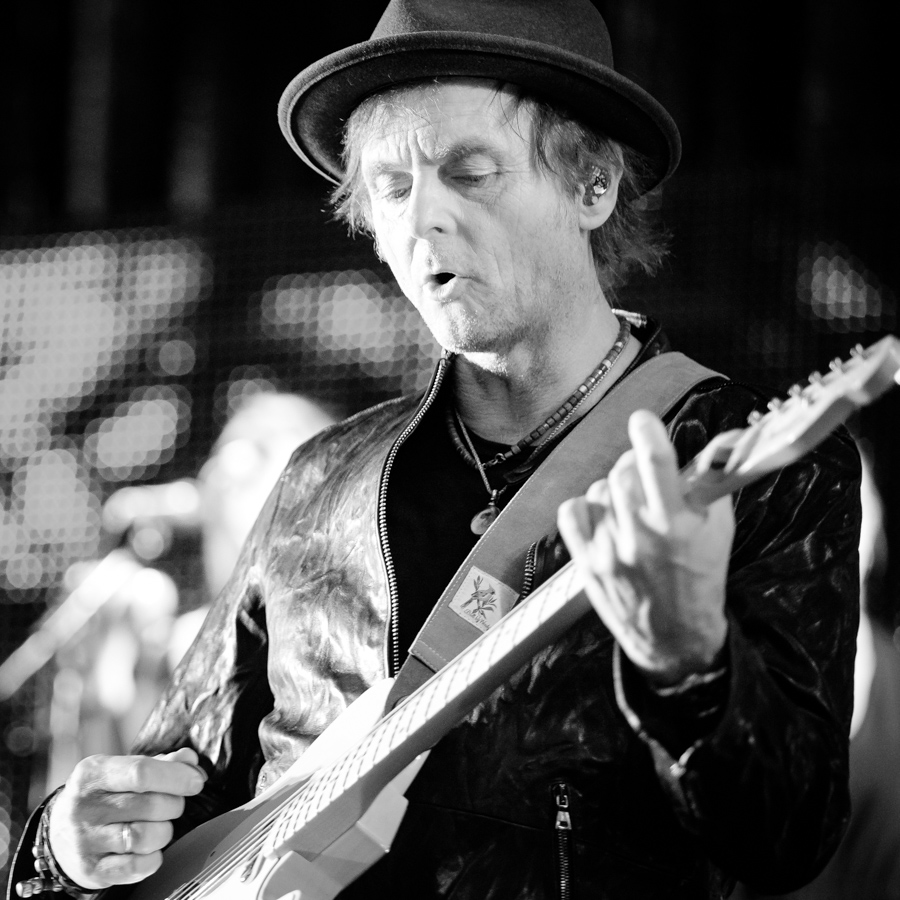
Paul Waaktaar-Savoy

- 6 September – Paul Waaktaar-Savoy, A-ha lead guitarist
- 8 September – Espen Borge, middle-distance runner.
- 11 September – Birgit Oline Kjerstad, politician.
- 13 September – Leif Johan Sevland, politician.
- 18 September – Linn Stokke, actress, singer and writer.
- 25 September – Fridtjof Thoen, judoka.

=== October ===
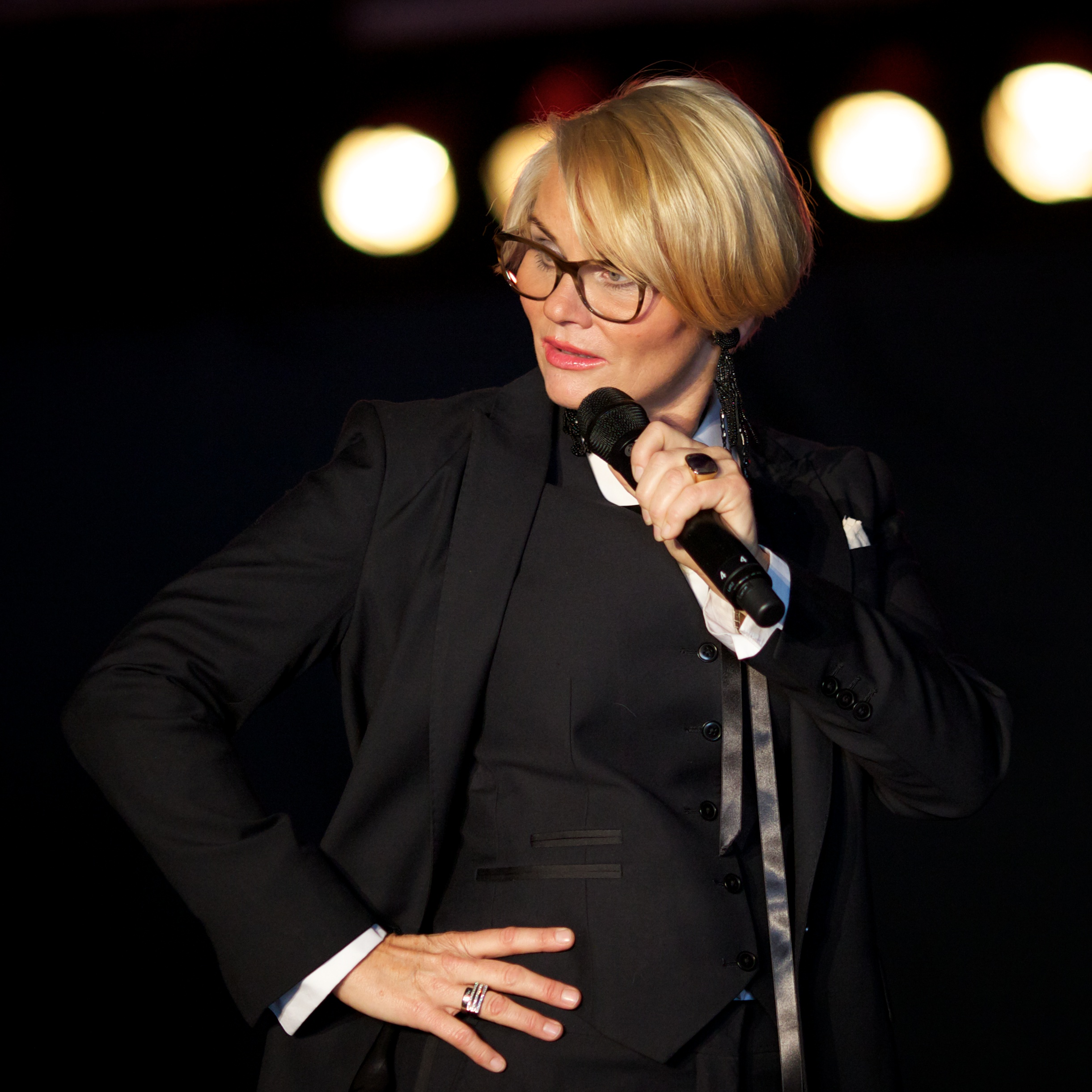
Mia Gundersen

- 3 October – Bård Eker, industrial designer.
- 6 October – Ib Thomsen, politician.
- 8 October – Rune Lorentsen, wheelchair curler.
- 18 October – Rolf Einar Fife, diplomat.
- 20 October – Audun Kleive, jazz drummer.
- 21 October – Arve Lønnum Jr., politician.
- 24 October – Gunnar Stavrum, newspaper editor.
- 27 October – Mia Gundersen, singer and actress.

=== November ===
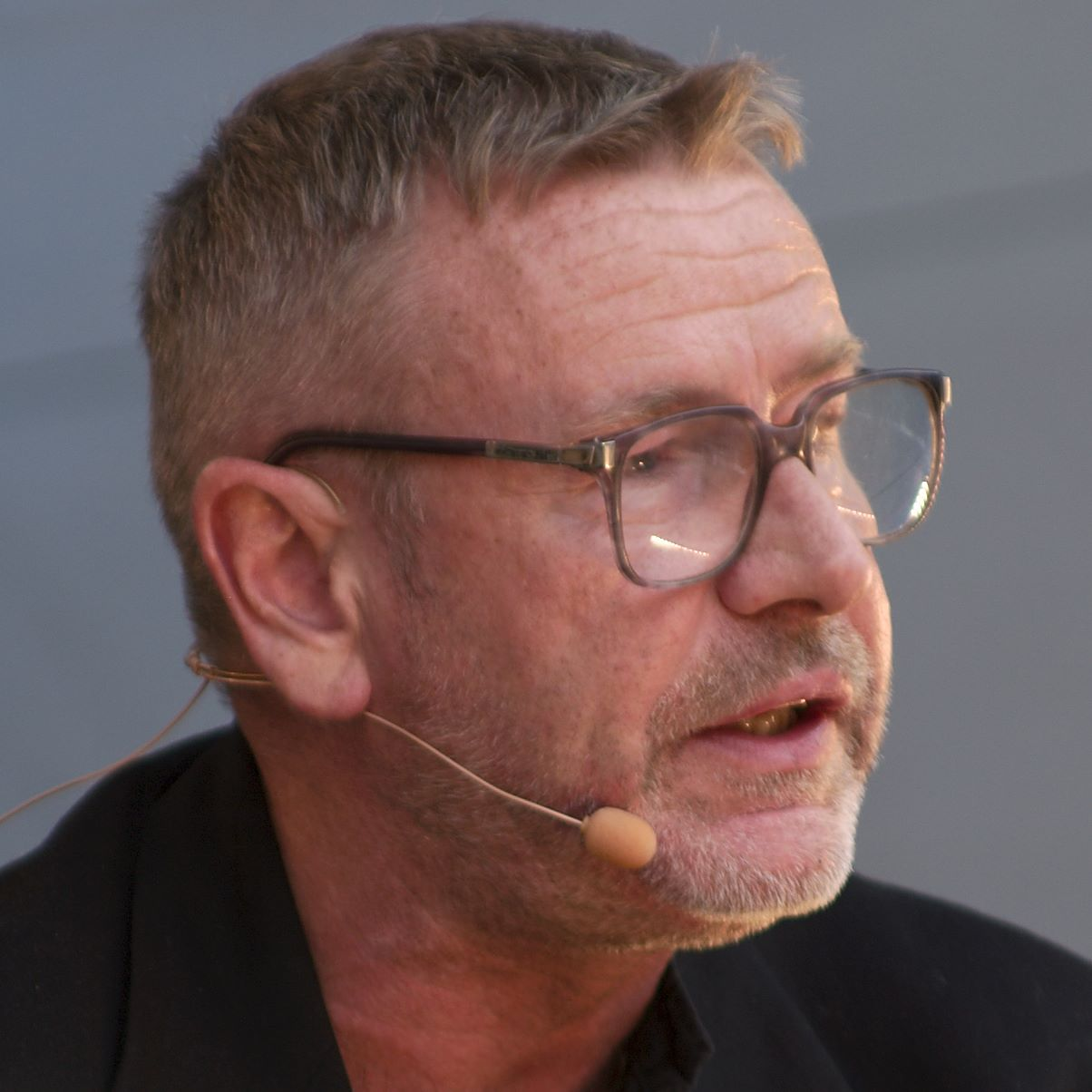
Tomas Espedal

- 4 November – Olaug Bollestad, politician.
- 12 November – Tomas Espedal, writer.
- 20 November – Ingeborg Midttømme, bishop.
- 24 November – Brit Pettersen, cross-country skier.

=== December ===
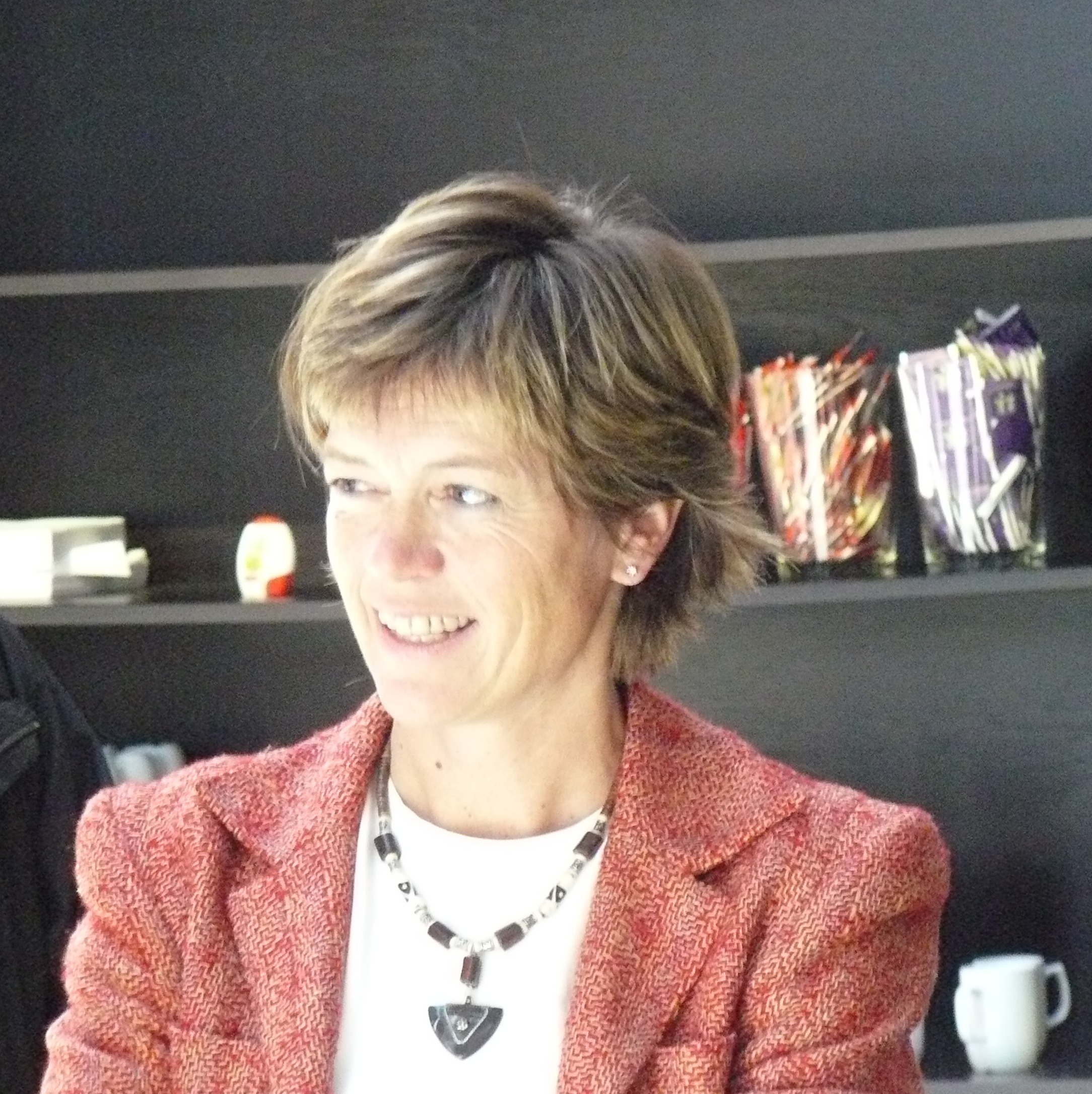
Grete Ingeborg Nykkelmo

- 3 December – Dag Usterud, sailor.
- 14 December – Guri Schanke, singer and actress.
- 16 December – Anders B. Werp, politician.
- 19 December – Anne Kristine Linnestad, politician.
- 24 December – Gaute Larsen, football manager.
- 25 December – Grete Ingeborg Nykkelmo, biathlete and cross-country skier.
- 30 December – Rolf Lislevand, lute player.

=== Full date missing ===
- Espen Bergh, judge.
- Leiv Lunde, politician.
- Cecilie Mauritzen, oceanographer.
- Rune Rebne, composer.

== Notable deaths ==
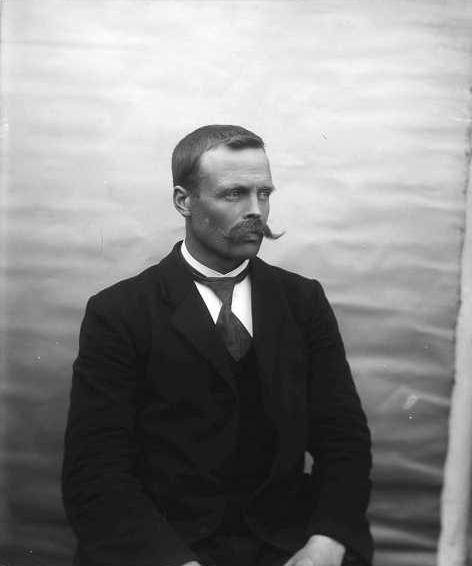
Olav Bjaaland was one of the first five men to reach the South Pole

- 23 January – Andreas Baalsrud, engineer (b. 1872)
- 3 March – Henny Astrup, actress (b. 1876)
- 13 March – Lise Lindbæk, war correspondent (b. 1905).
- 27 March – Jacob Pedersen, track and field athlete (b. 1889)
- 2 April – Arne Torolf Strøm, politician (b. 1901)
- 26 April – Anna Sethne, educator (born 1872).
- 2 May – Petter Jamvold, sailor and Olympic gold medallist (b. 1899)
- 24 May – Rachel Grepp, journalist and politician (b. 1879)
- 7 June – Harald Gram, jurist, politician and genealogist (b. 1887)
- 8 June – Olav Bjaaland, ski champion and polar explorer (b. 1873)
- 9 June – Arnstein Arneberg, architect (b.1882)
- 30 June – Lars Sverkeson Romundstad, politician (b. 1885)
- 14 August – Thomas Aas, sailor and Olympic gold medallist (b. 1887)
- 16 September – Johanne Samueline Pedersen, politician (b. 1887)
- 17 September – Henrik Ameln, jurist and politician (b. 1879)
- 25 September – Olav Gullvåg, playwright, novelist, poet and editor (b. 1885)
- 3 October – Anne Grimdalen, sculptor (b. 1899)
- 17 October – Jens Olai Steffensen, politician (b. 1891)
- 7 November – Johan Andreas Lippestad, NS politician (born 1902).
- 9 November – Ferdinand Bie, long jumper and Olympic gold medallist (b. 1888).
- 13 November – Herman Smitt Ingebretsen, politician (b. 1891)
- 20 November – Kitty Wentzel, writer, journalist (born 1868).
- 21 November – Hjalmar Olai Storeide, politician (b. 1901)
- 22 November – Ole Hallesby, Lutheran neo-orthodox pietist (b. 1879)
- 2 December – Sven Sømme, zoologist and ichthyologist (born 1904).
- 4 December – Ingvar Wedervang, economist and statistician (b. 1891)
- 12 December – Hauk Aabel, comedian and actor (b. 1867)
- 26 December – Kristofer Uppdal, poet and author (b. 1878)

=== Full date unknown ===
- Haakon Hauan, politician and Minister (b.1871)
- Lars Høgvold, ski jumper (b.1888)
- Kristian Løken, military officer (b.1884)
- Niels Nielsen, sailor and Olympic silver medallist (b.1883)
- Vaadjuv Nyqvist, sailor and Olympic silver medallist (b.1902)
- Arnold Rørholt, military officer (b.1884)
- Olav Martinus Knutsen Steinnes, politician and Minister (b.1886)
