= Norway at the 1984 Winter Olympics =

- IOC code: NOR
- NOC: Norwegian Olympic Committee

in Sarajevo, Yugoslavia February 8–19, 1984
- Competitors: 58 (50 men, 8 women) in 8 sports
- Flag bearer: Bjørg Eva Jensen (Speed skating)
- Medals Ranked 6th: Gold 3 Silver 2 Bronze 4 Total 9

Winter Olympics appearances (overview)
- 1924; 1928; 1932; 1936; 1948; 1952; 1956; 1960; 1964; 1968; 1972; 1976; 1980; 1984; 1988; 1992; 1994; 1998; 2002; 2006; 2010; 2014; 2018; 2022; 2026

Norway competed at the 1984 Winter Olympics in Sarajevo, Yugoslavia.

== Medalists ==
Medal	Name	Sport	Event	Date
Gold	Tom Sandberg	Nordic combined	Individual	12 February
Gold	Eirik Kvalfoss	Biathlon	Sprint	14 February
Gold	Inger Helene Nybråten; Anne Jahren; Brit Pettersen; Berit Aunli	Cross-country skiing	Women's 4 × 5 km relay	15 February
Silver	Berit Aunli	Cross-country skiing	Women's 5 km	12 February
Silver	Odd Lirhus; Eirik Kvalfoss; Rolf Storsveen; Kjell Søbak	Biathlon	Relay	17 February
Bronze	Brit Pettersen	Cross-country skiing	Women's 10 km	9 February
Bronze	Eirik Kvalfoss	Biathlon	Individual	11 February
Bronze	Kai Arne Engelstad	Speed skating	Men's 1000 metres	14 February
Bronze	Anne Jahren	Cross-country skiing	Women's 20 km	18 February

== Alpine skiing ==
Men

Athlete	Event	Race 1		Race 2		Total	
Athlete	Event	Time	Rank	Time	Rank	Time	Rank
Odd Sørli	Giant Slalom	1:22.90	15	1:23.49	19	2:46.39	19
Odd Sørli	Slalom	DNF	–	–	–	DNF	–

== Biathlon ==
Men

Event	Athlete	Misses ^{1}	Time	Rank
10 km Sprint	Terje Krokstad	4	33:00.9	18
10 km Sprint	Kjell Søbak	1	31:19.7	4
10 km Sprint	Eirik Kvalfoss	2	30:53.8	1st place, gold medalist(s)

Event	Athlete	Time	Penalties	Adjusted time ^{2}	Rank
20 km	Odd Lirhus	1'11:55.0	9	1'20:55.0	24
20 km	Rolf Storsveen	1'11:23.9	4	1'15:23.9	6
20 km	Eirik Kvalfoss	1'09:02.4	5	1'14:02.4	3rd place, bronze medalist(s)

Men's 4 x 7.5 km relay

Athletes	Race		
Athletes	Misses ^{1}	Time	Rank
Odd Lirhus; Eirik Kvalfoss; Rolf Storsveen; Kjell Søbak	2	1'39:03.9	2nd place, silver medalist(s)

^{1} A penalty loop of 150 metres had to be skied per missed target.
^{2} One minute added per missed target.

== Cross-country skiing ==
Men

Event	Athlete	Race	
Event	Athlete	Time	Rank
15 km	Ove Aunli	DSQ	–
15 km	Geir Holte	43:23.3	20
15 km	Pål Gunnar Mikkelsplass	42:59.7	17
15 km	Tor Håkon Holte	42:37.4	8
30 km	Oddvar Brå	1'36:23.4	32
30 km	Jan Lindvall	1'32:23.3	13
30 km	Pål Gunnar Mikkelsplass	1'32:20.6	12
30 km	Lars-Erik Eriksen	1'31:24.8	6
50 km	Ove Aunli	DNF	–
50 km	Tor Håkon Holte	2'22:12.7	12
50 km	Lars-Erik Eriksen	2'22:09.5	11
50 km	Jan Lindvall	2'19:27.1	5

Men's 4 × 10 km relay

Athletes	Race	
Athletes	Time	Rank
Lars-Erik Eriksen; Jan Lindvall; Ove Aunli; Tor Håkon Holte	1'57:27.6	4

Women

Event	Athlete	Race	
Event	Athlete	Time	Rank
5 km	Anne Jahren	17:38.3	7
5 km	Brit Pettersen	17:33.6	6
5 km	Inger Helene Nybråten	17:28.2	5
5 km	Berit Aunli	17:14.1	2nd place, silver medalist(s)
10 km	Marit Myrmæl	32:35.3	7
10 km	Anne Jahren	32:26.2	5
10 km	Berit Aunli	32:17.7	4
10 km	Brit Pettersen	32:12.7	3rd place, bronze medalist(s)
20 km	Marit Myrmæl	1'05:01.9	14
20 km	Inger Helene Nybråten	1'04:51.2	11
20 km	Brit Pettersen	1'03:49.0	6
20 km	Anne Jahren	1'03:13.6	3rd place, bronze medalist(s)

Women's 4 × 5 km relay

Athletes	Race	
Athletes	Time	Rank
Inger Helene Nybråten; Anne Jahren; Brit Pettersen; Berit Aunli	1'06:49.7	1st place, gold medalist(s)

== Ice hockey ==
=== Group B ===
Top two teams (shaded ones) advanced to the medal round.

Team	Pld	W	L	T	GF	GA	Pts
Czechoslovakia	5	5	0	0	38	7	10
Canada	5	4	1	0	24	10	8
Finland	5	2	2	1	27	19	5
United States	5	1	2	2	16	17	4
Austria	5	1	4	0	13	37	2
Norway	5	0	4	1	15	43	1

- Czechoslovakia 10-4 Norway
- Finland 16-2 Norway
- Norway 3-3 USA
- Canada 8-1 Norway
- Austria 6-5 Norway
- Team roster

- Trond Abrahamsen
- Cato Hamre Andersen
- Arne Bergseng
- Åge Ellingsen
- Stephen Foyn
- Jørn Goldstein
- Øystein Jarlsbo
- Roy Johansen
- Jon-Magne Karlstad
- Erik Kristiansen
- Per-Arne Kristiansen
- Øivind Løsåmoen
- Ørjan Løvdal
- Sven Lien
- Jim Marthinsen
- Geir Myhre
- Erik Nerell
- Bjørn Skaare
- Petter Thoresen
- Frank Vestreng

Head coach: Hans Westberg

== Luge ==
Men

Athlete	Run 1		Run 2		Run 3		Run 4		Total	
Athlete	Time	Rank	Time	Rank	Time	Rank	Time	Rank	Time	Rank
Asle Strand	48.567	26	47.629	19	47.874	25	47.573	20	3:11.643	22

Women

Athlete	Run 1		Run 2		Run 3		Run 4		Total	
Athlete	Time	Rank	Time	Rank	Time	Rank	Time	Rank	Time	Rank
Agnes Aanonsen	43.140	13	43.715	21	43.379	17	51.031	24	3:01.265	23

== Nordic combined ==
Events:

- normal hill ski jumping (Three jumps, best two counted and shown here.)
- 15 km cross-country skiing

Athlete	Event	Ski Jumping				Cross-country			Total	
Athlete	Event	Distance 1	Distance 2	Points	Rank	Time	Points	Rank	Points	Rank
Hallstein Bøgseth	Individual	79.5	84.0	193.0	18	48:58.0	198.100	8	391.100	11
Geir Andersen	Individual	83.0	83.0	203.8	8	49:56.3	189.355	18	393.155	10
Espen Andersen	Individual	79.0	86.0	188.8	20	49:53.9	189.715	16	378.515	19
Tom Sandberg	Individual	86.0	88.0	214.7	1	47:52.7	207.895	2	422.595	1st place, gold medalist(s)

== Ski jumping ==
Athlete	Event	Jump 1		Jump 2		Total	
Athlete	Event	Distance	Points	Distance	Points	Points	Rank
Per Bergerud	Normal hill	75.0	74.5	78.5	85.6	160.1	46
Vegard Opaas	Normal hill	86.0	101.1	87.0	102.7	203.8	8
Steinar Bråten	Normal hill	85.0	102.0	79.0	87.9	189.9	18
Rolf Åge Berg	Normal hill	86.0	104.1	86.5	104.4	208.5	5
Rolf Åge Berg	Large hill	74.0	12.8	90.0	74.7	87.5	52
Ole Gunnar Fidjestøl	Large hill	95.0	82.2	94.0	81.8	164.0	31
Vegard Opaas	Large hill	100.0	89.2	95.5	81.9	171.1	27
Ole Christian Eidhammer	Large hill	100.5	93.4	97.0	86.5	179.9	18

== Speed skating ==
Men

Event	Athlete	Race	
Event	Athlete	Time	Rank
500 m	Rolf Falk-Larssen	39.57	23
500 m	Kai Arne Engelstad	39.28	18
500 m	Frode Rønning	38.58	7
1000 m	Frode Rønning	1:18.64	14
1000 m	Kai Arne Engelstad	1:16.75	3rd place, bronze medalist(s)
1500 m	Bjørn Nyland	2:02.05	19
1500 m	Rolf Falk-Larssen	2:01.65	17
1500 m	Kai Arne Engelstad	2:00.59	12
5000 m	Rolf Falk-Larssen	7:25.54	15
5000 m	Geir Karlstad	7:20.24	10
5000 m	Bjørn Nyland	7:18.27	7
10,000 m	Bjørn Nyland	15:08.34	13
10,000 m	Henry Nilsen	14:57.81	8
10,000 m	Geir Karlstad	14:52.40	4

Women

Event	Athlete	Race	
Event	Athlete	Time	Rank
500 m	Edel Therese Høiseth	43.96	24
1000 m	Edel Therese Høiseth	1:27.90	20
1000 m	Bjørg Eva Jensen	1:27.08	16
1500 m	Bjørg Eva Jensen	2:09.53	8
3000 m	Bjørg Eva Jensen	4:36.28	7
