= Solheim (surname) =

Solheim is a surname. Notable people with the surname include:

- Eirik Solheim (born 1960), Norwegian physician
- Elling M. Solheim (1905–1971), Norwegian writer
- Erik Solheim (born 1955), Norwegian politician
- Espen Solheim (born 1976), Norwegian football player
- Fabian Wilkens Solheim (born 1996), Norwegian alpine ski racer
- Iselin Solheim (born 1990), Norwegian singer
- Iselin Moen Solheim (born 1995), Norwegian freestyle wrestler
- Jorun Solheim (born 1944), Norwegian social anthropologist and women's studies academic
- Karsten Solheim (1911–2000), Norwegian-born American golf club designer and businessman
- Ken Solheim (born 1961), Canadian ice hockey forward
- Leif Solheim (born 1932), Norwegian ice hockey player
- Maria Solheim (born 1982), Norwegian singer-songwriter
- Mats Solheim (born 1987), Norwegian football player
- Mona Solheim (born 1979), Norwegian taekwondo athlete
- Nina Solheim (born 1979), Norwegian taekwondo athlete
- Øivind Solheim (1928–2017), Norwegian ice hockey player
- Robert Solheim, electronic music composer from Norway
- Svale Solheim (1903–1971), Norwegian folklorist
- Torolv Solheim (1907–1995), Norwegian educator, essayist, resistance member and politician
- Wilhelm Solheim (1924–2014), American anthropologist specializing in Southeast Asia
- Wilhelm Solheim (botanist) (1898–1978), American botanist
