= Vidar Johansen =

Vidar Johansen may refer to:

- Vidar Johansen (ice hockey)
- Vidar Johansen (musician)
