= Solheim =

Solheim is a Norwegian word and surname meaning "home of the Sun". It may refer to:

== Places ==
=== Iceland ===
- Sólheimajökull, a glacier in southern Iceland between the volcanoes Katla and Eyjafjallajökull

=== Norway ===
- Solheim, Bergen, a village in Bergen Municipality (north of Minde, Bergen) in Vestland county
- Solheim, Masfjorden, a village in Masfjorden Municipality in Vestland county
- Solheim, Nordland, a village in Steigen Municipality in Nordland county
- Solheim, Vestland, a village in Gloppen Municipality in Vestland county

=== United States ===
- E. H. Hobe House-Solheim or Solheim, a house in White Bear Lake, Minnesota

=== Netherlands ===
- Villa Solheim, home to 24 fraternity students in Delft, South Holland

== People ==
- Solheim (surname)

== Other uses ==
- Solheim Cup, biennial golf tournament for professional women golfers, named for Karsten Solheim
- Solheim IF, former Norwegian football club from Lørenskog
