= Teatret Vårt =

Theatre in Molde, Norway

Coordinates: 62°44′10″N 7°09′19″E

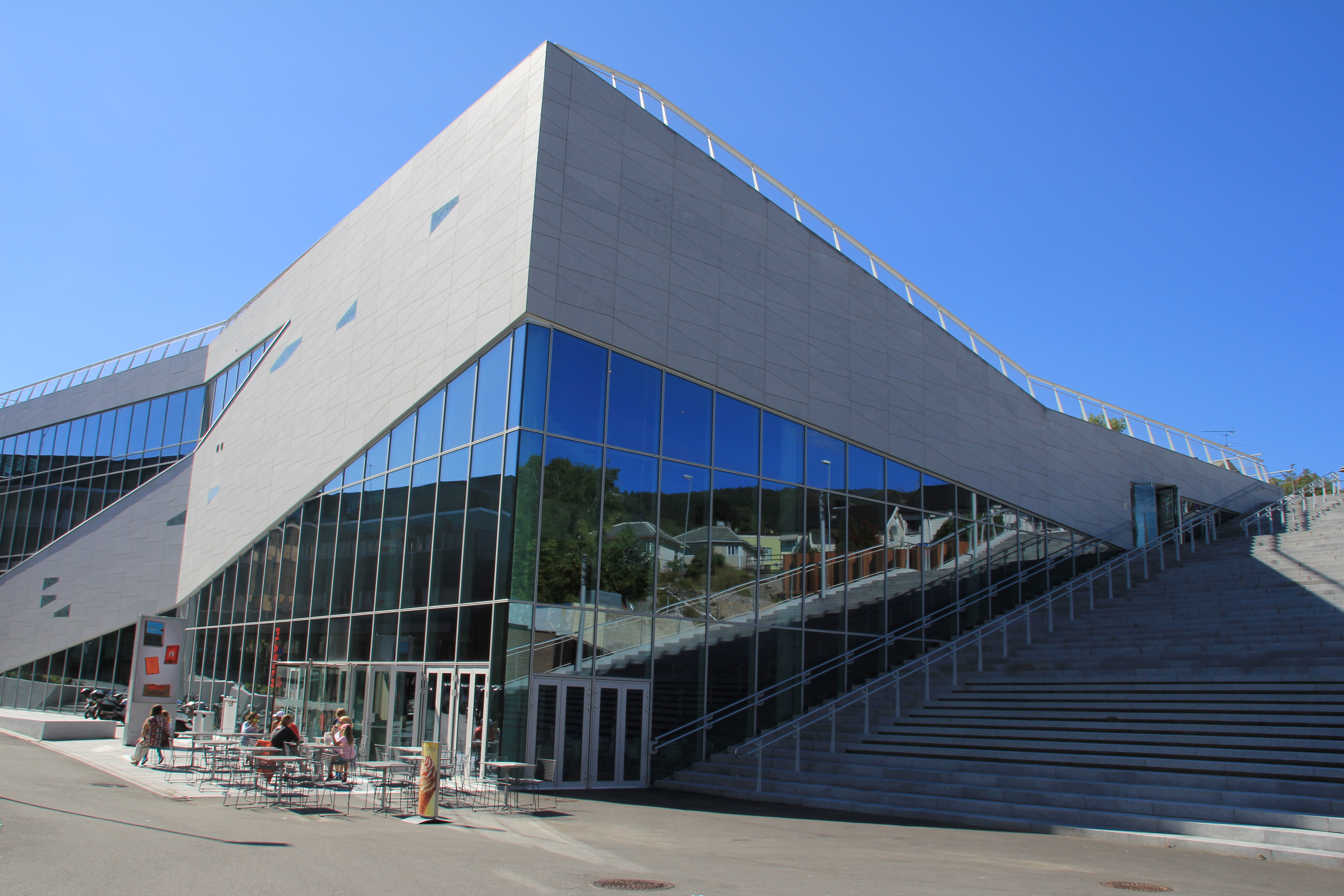
From 2012 Teatret Vårt has been located in the cultural building called "Plassen" at Gørvelplassen in Molde. Other institutions based in the same building include Moldejazz and Molde public library.

Teatret Vårt is a regional theatre for Møre og Romsdal county, Norway. It was established in 1972 and is based in Molde. The theatre cooperates with the annual Molde International Jazz Festival. Carl Morten Amundsen has been the theatre director since 2000.
