= Terje Thoen =

Norwegian ice hockey player

Terje Thoen (23 April 1944 – 30 July 2008) was a Norwegian ice hockey player. He played for the Norwegian national ice hockey team, and participated at the Winter Olympics in 1968 and in 1972 as well as World Championships. He was capped 51 times and mainly spent his club career in Hasle-Løren IL. He was awarded Gullpucken as best Norwegian ice hockey player in 1971.

After his retirement, Thoen was a schoolteacher. He also held exhibitions as an amateur painter.
