= Sven Lien =

Norwegian ice hockey player

Personal information
- Full name: Sven Helge Lien
- Born: 4 August 1958 (age 67) Drøbak, Norway
- Height: 1.72 m (5 ft 8 in)

Sport
- Sport: Ice hockey
- Club: Furuset IF

Sven Helge Lien (born 4 August 1958) is a Norwegian former ice hockey player. He was born in Drøbak and played for the club Furuset IF. He played for the Norwegian national ice hockey team at the 1984 Winter Olympics.

== See also ==
- Norway at the 1984 Winter Olympics § Ice hockey
- Ice hockey at the 1984 Winter Olympics § Group B
