= Georg Smefjell =

Norwegian ice hockey player

Georg Smefjell (9 June 1937 – 6 December 2015) was a Norwegian ice hockey player. He played for the Norwegian national ice hockey team, and participated at the Winter Olympics in 1964 and in 1968. He was awarded Gullpucken as best Norwegian ice hockey player in 1969.

He was born in Mysen.
