= Arne Mikkelsen =

Norwegian ice hockey player (born 1944)

Arne Reidar Mikkelsen (born 23 July 1944) is a Norwegian ice hockey player. He played for the Norwegian national ice hockey team, and participated at the Winter Olympics in 1968 and in 1972. During his career he played 72 official matches in Olympics and world championships for the national team.

He was awarded Gullpucken as best Norwegian ice hockey player in 1973.

He won ten national titles with Vålerenga Ishockey.
