= Trond Abrahamsen =

Norwegian ice hockey player

Personal information
- Full name: Trond Sevåg Abrahamsen
- Born: 16 July 1960 (age 65) Hammerfest (town), Norway
- Height: 1.83 m (6 ft 0 in)

Sport
- Sport: Ice hockey
- Club: IL Manglerud Star

Trond Sevåg Abrahamsen (born 16 July 1960 in Hammerfest (town)) is a Norwegian ice hockey player. He played for the Norwegian national ice hockey team, and participated at the Winter Olympic Games in 1980 and 1984. In 1983, he was awarded Gullpucken as best Norwegian ice hockey player. He also played for IL Manglerud/Star.

== See also ==
- Norway at the 1980 Winter Olympics § Ice hockey
- Norway at the 1984 Winter Olympics § Ice hockey
- Ice hockey at the 1980 Winter Olympics § Blue Division
- Ice hockey at the 1984 Winter Olympics § Group B
