= Gullpucken =

Norwegian ice hockey award

Gullpucken (translit. the Golden puck) is awarded by the Norwegian Ice Hockey Federation (NIHF) to the best Norwegian ice hockey player each year. The award is subject to consideration which means it is not necessarily awarded every year. Its inception year was 1959, when Leif Solheim of Furuset became its first recipient. Patrick Thoresen was the last who received the award in 2009.

The NIHF also awards the Valemon trophy to the best Norwegian female ice hockey player.

== Winners ==
- 2023: Emil Martinsen Lilleberg, IK Oskarshamn
- 2022: Mats Zuccarello, Minnesota Wild
- 2021: Erlend Lesund, Rögle BK
- 2020: Henrik Haukeland, KooKoo
- 2019: Tobias Lindström, Vålerenga Ishockey
- 2018: Ken André Olimb Linköping HC
- 2017: Mats Zuccarello, New York Rangers
- 2016: Mats Zuccarello, New York Rangers
- 2015: Mathis Olimb, Frölunda HC
- 2014: Jonas Holøs, Lokomotiv Yaroslavl
- 2013: Lars Haugen, HK Dinamo Minsk
- 2012: Patrick Thoresen, SKA St. Petersburg
- 2011: Anders Bastiansen, Färjestad BK
- 2010: Mats Zuccarello, MODO Hockey
- 2009: Patrick Thoresen, HC Lugano
- 2008: Mats Trygg, Kölner Haie
- 2007: Anders Bastiansen, Mora IK
- 2006: Tore Vikingstad, DEG Metro Stars
- 2005: Tommy Jakobsen
- 2004: no award
- 2003: Tommy Jakobsen, DEG Metro Stars
- 2002: Mats Trygg, Färjestads BK
- 2001: no award
- 2000: Pål Johnsen, Storhamar Dragons
- 1999: Svein Enok Nørstebø, Trondheim Black Panthers
- 1998: Morten Finstad, Stjernen Hockey
- 1997: Petter Salsten, Storhamar Dragons
- 1996: Ole Eskil Dahlstøm, Storhamar Dragons
- 1995: Trond Magnussen, Lillehammer IK
- 1994: Espen Knutsen, Vålerenga Ishockey
- 1993: Jim Marthinsen, Vålerenga Ishockey
- 1992: Jon Magne Karlstad, Vålerenga Ishockey
- 1991: Geir Hoff, Furuset Ishockey
- 1990: Stephen Foyn, Sparta Warriors
- 1989: Jim Marthinsen, Trondheim Black Panthers
- 1988: Petter Salsten, Furuset Ishockey
- 1987: Ørjan Løvdal, Stjernen Hockey
- 1986: Ørjan Løvdal, Stjernen Hockey
- 1985: Erik Kristiansen, Storhamar Dragons
- 1984: Øyvind Løsamoen, Storhamar Dragons
- 1983: Trond Abrahamsen, Manglerud Star Ishockey
- 1982: Geir Myhre, Sparta Warriors
- 1981: Bjørn Skaare, Furuset Ishockey
- 1980: Geir Myhre, Hasle-Løren Ishockey
- 1979: Morten Sethereng, Frisk Tigers
- 1978: Roar Øfstedal, Manglerud Star Ishockey
- 1977: Jørn Goldstein, Manglerud Star Ishockey
- 1976: Svein Pedersen, Hasle-Løren Ishockey
- 1975: Morten Johansen, Frisk Tigers
- 1974: Jan Kinder, Hasle-Løren Ishockey
- 1973: Arne Mikkelsen, Vålerenga Ishockey
- 1972: Steinar Bjølbakk, Vålerenga Ishockey
- 1971: Terje Thoen, Sinsen IF
- 1970: Steinar Bjølbakk, Vålerenga Ishockey
- 1969: Georg Smefjell, Tigrene
- 1968: Olav Dalsøren, Tigrene
- 1967: Jan Erik Solberg, Jar IL
- 1966: Per Skjerwen Olsen, Vålerenga Ishockey
- 1965: Thor Martinsen, Skeid Ishockey
- 1964: Chr. Petersen, Forward Flyers
- 1963: Einar Bruno Larsen, Vålerenga Ishockey
- 1962: Roar Bakke, Forward Flyers
- 1961: Knut Nygård, Skeid Ishockey
- 1961: Egil Bjerklund, Hasle-Løren Ishockey
- 1960: Tor Gundersen, Vålerenga Ishockey
- 1959: Leif Solheim, Furuset Ishockey
