= Egil Bjerklund =

Norwegian ice hockey player (1933–2022)

- Born: 5 September 1933 Oslo, Norway
- Died: 29 September 2022 (aged 89) Oslo, Norway
- Position: Left wing/Defence
- Shot: Left
- Played for: Hasle-Løren IL
- National team: Norway
- Playing career: 1951–1965

Egil Henrik Bjerklund (5 September 1933 – 29 September 2022) was a Norwegian ice hockey player. He played for the Norway national team and participated at the Winter Olympics in 1952 and in 1964. He was awarded Gullpucken as the best Norwegian ice hockey player in 1961.

Bjerklund died on 29 September 2022.
