= Olav Dalsøren =

Norwegian ice hockey player

Personal information
- Born: 8 September 1938 (age 86); Oslo, Norway
- Awards: Gullpucken (1968)

Sport
- Sport: Ice hockey
- Club: IK Tigrene; Frisk Asker Ishockey

Olav Dalsøren (born 8 September 1938) is a Norwegian ice hockey player. He played for the Norwegian national ice hockey team, and participated at the Winter Olympics in 1964 and in 1968. He was awarded Gullpucken as best Norwegian ice hockey player in 1968.

== Career ==
=== Club career ===
Dalsøren played for the clubs Sinsen, IK Tigrene, and Frisk Asker. He became national champion with his club in 1961, when IK Tigrene won the title. and in 1975, with Frisk.

He was awarded Gullpucken as best player of the season in 1968.

=== International career ===
During his career Dalsøren played 78 official world championship and Olympic matches for the Norway men's national ice hockey team.

He competed at the 1964 Winter Olympics in Innsbruck, where Norway placed tenth, and at the 1968 Winter Olympics in Grenoble, where Norway placed eleventh.
