= Vochov =

- Municipality
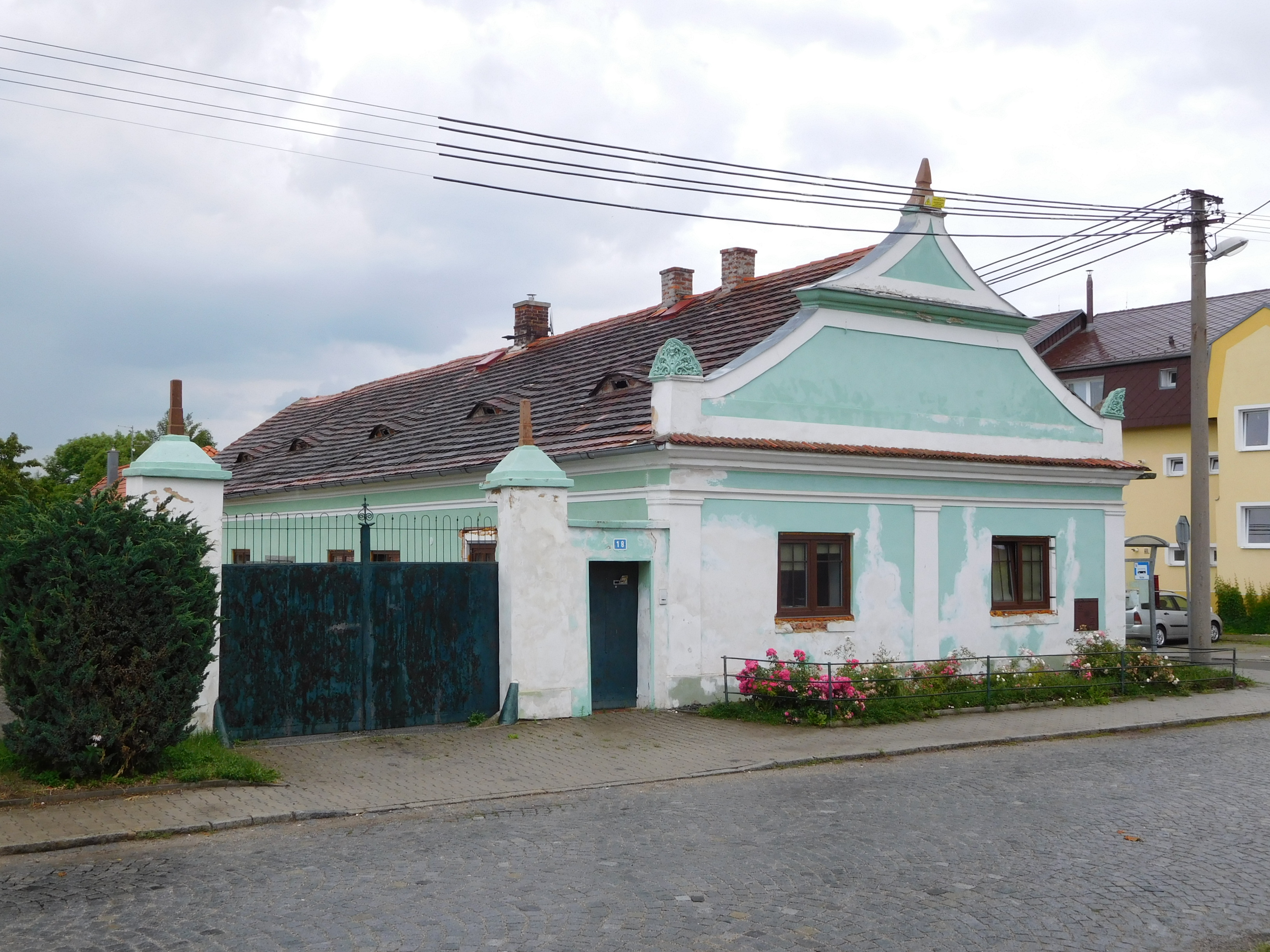
- House No. 18

- Flag Coat of arms

- Location in the Czech Republic
- Coordinates: 49°45′25″N 13°16′42″E
- Country: Czech Republic
- Region: Plzeň
- District: Plzeň-North
- First mentioned: 1318

Area
  - Total: 5.43 km^{2} (2.10 sq mi)
- Elevation: 356 m (1,168 ft)

Population (2026-01-01)
  - Total: 1,989
  - Density: 366/km^{2} (949/sq mi)
- Time zone: UTC+1 (CET)
  - Summer (DST): UTC+2 (CEST)
- Postal code: 330 32
- Website: www.obec-vochov.cz

Vochov is a municipality and village in Plzeň-North District in the Plzeň Region of the Czech Republic. It has about 2,000 inhabitants.

== Etymology ==
The name is derived from the personal name Voch, meaning "Voch's (court)".

== Geography ==
Vochov is located about 6 kilometres (4 mi) west of Plzeň. It lies in the Plasy Uplands, in an agricultural landscape. The highest point is a nameless hill at 401 m (1,316 ft) above sea level. The Mže River flows along the northern municipal border.

== History ==
The first written mention of Vochov is from 1318. After 1379, the village was bought by Heřman of Nečtiny and annexed to the Buben estate (today a castle ruin in the territory of Plešnice). By 1503 at the latest, Vochov was part of the Malesice estate.

== Demographics ==
Historical population

Year	Pop.	±%
1869	350	—
1880	359	+2.6%
1890	433	+20.6%
1900	448	+3.5%
1910	565	+26.1%

Year	Pop.	±%
1921	756	+33.8%
1930	885	+17.1%
1950	603	−31.9%
1961	658	+9.1%
1970	557	−15.3%

Year	Pop.	±%
1980	536	−3.8%
1991	570	+6.3%
2001	570	+0.0%
2011	673	+18.1%
2021	1,499	+122.7%

Source: Censuses

== Transport ==
Vochov is located on the railway line Radnice–Bezdružice via Plzeň.

== Sights ==
The only protected cultural monument in the municipality is an archaeological site where a burial mound from the Late Bronze Age (Milavče culture) was located.

== Notable people ==
- Bohuslav Ebermann (born 1948), ice hockey player
