= Steinar Bjølbakk =

Norwegian ice hockey player (1946–2024)

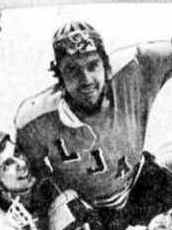
- Bjølbakk in 1972
- Born: 6 September 1946 Oslo, Norway
- Died: 1 August 2024 (aged 77)
- Position: Centre-forward
- Played for: Vålerenga Ishockey; Lamberseter/Ljan; Sparta Sarpsborg; Rosenborg IHK
- National team: Norway

Steinar Børre Bjølbakk (6 September 1946 – 1 August 2024) was a Norwegian ice hockey player. Playing the centre-forward position, he won seven national titles with the club Vålerenga and one title with Sparta. He played 60 matches for the Norwegian national ice hockey team, and participated at the Winter Olympics in 1968 and in 1972. He was awarded Gullpucken as best Norwegian ice hockey player in both 1970 and 1972, the first person to win Gullpucken twice.

== Career ==
=== Club career ===
Bjølbakk made his debut for Vålerenga in 1963. A centre-forward and playmaker, he won six consecutive national titles with Vålerenga between 1965 and 1970. He won the trophy Gullpucken for Vålerenga in 1970. In total he played 16 seasons for Vålerenga, playing 326 matches for the club and scoring 252 goals.

During the season 1971/72 he played for the club Lamberseter/Ljan, and Bjølbakk was voted winner of Gullpucken for the second time in 1972. He was the first player to receive Gullpucken twice.

He was back with Vålerenga from the 1972/73 season, when VIF became Norwegian champions and won the Kongepokal trophy. He thus won a total of seven national titles with Vålerenga. His last season for Vålerenga was 1980/81.

From 1981/82 he played for the club Sparta Sarpsborg, and won the double (both the series and the national title) with Sparta in the 1983/84 season.

In the 1985/1986 season he played for and coached the club Rosenborg IHK.

Bjølbakk retired from ice hockey in 1986.

=== International career ===
In 1963 Bjølbakk had his first appearance at the Norway men's national ice hockey team. During his career he played 60 official world championship and Olympic matches for the national team.

He competed at the 1968 Winter Olympics in Grenoble, where Norway placed eleventh, and at the 1972 Winter Olympics in Sapporo, where Norway placed eighth.

== Personal life and death ==
Bjølbakk was born on 6 September 1946, growing up at Sinsen. He died on 1 August 2024, at the age of 77.
