= Per Skjerwen Olsen =

Norwegian ice hockey player (born 1939)

Personal information
- Born: 26 September 1939 Oslo, Norway

Sport
- Sport: Ice hockey
- Club: Vålerengens IF

Per Skjerwen Olsen (born 26 September 1939) is a Norwegian ice hockey player. He played for the Norwegian national ice hockey team, and participated at the Winter Olympics in 1964 and 1968. He was Norwegian champion with Vålerenga in 1965, 1966, 1967, 1968 and 1969. He was awarded Gullpucken as best Norwegian ice hockey player in 1966.

== Personal life ==
Skjerwen Olsen was born in Oslo on 26 September 1939.
