= Roar Øfstedal =

Norwegian ice hockey player (born 1953)

Roar Øvstedal (born 1953) is a Norwegian former ice hockey player. He played for Manglerud Star, and won the Gullpucken in 1978.
