= Kjetil Rolness =

Norwegian sociologist, musician and author

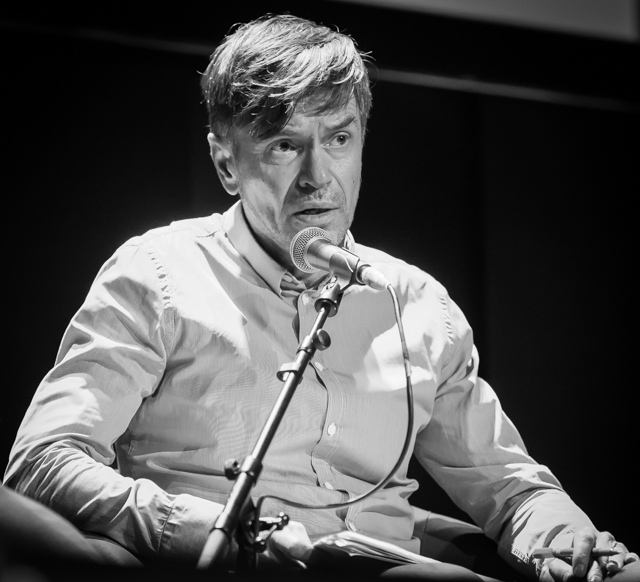
Kjetil Rolness in a debate at Cosmopolite in Oslo, 2015.

Kjetil Rolness (born 13 July 1961) is a Norwegian sociologist with main interest in taste sociology and pop cultural expressions. He is also a writer, lecturer and entertainer. He is active as a social commentator in social media and a columnist for Aftenposten, and has published several books.

Born in Voss Municipality, he grew up in Bergen, Alta and Harstad. While originally a left-wing, Rolness has become known for critical views on political correctness.

In music, Rolness is active as the lead vocalist alter ego Jens Pikenes in the campy band Penthouse Playboys. The band's Christmas concert at the Rockefeller Music Hall has become a popular tradition in Norwegian music life since 1995.

== Books ==
- 2003: Sex, løgn og videofilm: Et usladdet oppgjør med mytene om porno. Aschehoug.
- 2000: Bakmålsordboka: 1000 ord og uttrykk du ikke ante du trengte. Kagge.
- 1998: Elvis Presley. Gyldendal.
- 1995: Med smak skal hjemmet bygges: innredning av det moderne Norge. Aschehoug.
- 1992: Vulgær og vidunderlig: en studie i utsøkt dårlig smak. Aschehoug.
- 1991: Kunstig og kulørt: invitasjon til smakens avviksosiologi. Magistergradsavhandling.
