= Erik Thyness =

Norwegian judge

Erik Thyness (born 30 May 1961) is a Norwegian judge.

After finishing the cand.jur. degree in 1987 he was a deputy judge and junior solicitor, before working in private enterprise. He was a lawyer in Norsk Hydro from 1991 and Hafslund Nycomed from 1993, becoming legal director there before becoming a partner in Wiersholm law firm in 1996. He was appointed as a Supreme Court Justice in 2019.
