= Guttorm Schjelderup =

Norwegian economist

Guttorm Schjelderup (born 15 January 1961) is a Norwegian economist.

He graduated as siv.øk. in 1985 and cand.oecon. in 1987 from the Norwegian School of Economics. He took the doctor's degree in 1992 with the thesis Five Essays on Tax Policy in an Open Economy. He became associate professor at the Norwegian School of Economics and Business Administration in 1993, and was promoted to professor in 2000. He has also been a visiting scholar at the Cambridge University and the University of Colorado at Boulder, and has refereed articles in several publications, including The American Economic Review.

He was a member of the Norwegian property tax committee which proposed that all land was eligible for property taxation and that local municipalities should be allowed to set their own local property taxes within limits.

He has been a member of several public committees, chairing the Shipping Tax Committee that delivered the report NOU 2006: 4. and also chairing the government committee on tax havens and development (NOU 2009: 19).
