= Øivind Solheim =

Norwegian ice hockey player

Personal information
- Born: 28 May 1928 Oslo, Norway
- Died: 24 July 2017 (aged 89) Oslo

Sport
- Sport: Ice hockey
- Club: Furuset IF

Øivind Solheim (28 May 1928 – 24 July 2017) was a Norwegian ice hockey player. He played for the Norwegian national ice hockey team, and participated at the Winter Olympics in 1952. He was a brother of Olympian ice hockey player Leif Solheim.
