= Peter Hell =

German bobsledder

Personal information
- Nationality: German
- Born: 3 April 1947 (age 77); Munich, Germany

Sport
- Sport: Bobsleigh

Peter Hell (born 3 April 1947) is a German bobsledder. He competed in the two man and the four man events at the 1980 Winter Olympics.
