= Brigitte Flierl =

German speed skater

Personal information
- Nationality: German
- Born: 9 October 1956 (age 68); Amberg, West Germany

Sport
- Sport: Speed skating

Brigitte Flierl (born 9 October 1956) is a German former speed skater. She competed in two events at the 1980 Winter Olympics.
