= Pål Brekke =

Norwegian solar physicist and astrophysicist

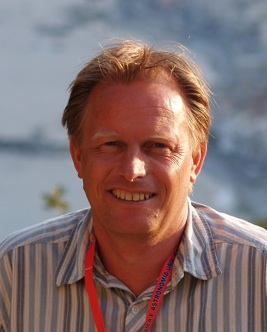
- Pål Brekke (Photo: Kevin Schenk)
- Born: 23 May 1961 (age 63)

Pål Brekke (born 23 May 1961) in Oslo, Norway) is a Norwegian solar physicist astrophysicist who received his Cand Mag. degree in astrophysics from University of Oslo in 1985 and PhD, from University of Oslo in 1992. His thesis focused on the ultraviolet (UV) emissions from the Sun observed with instruments on sounding rockets and the space shuttle Challenger. His work focused on dynamical aspects of the Sun and measuring variations in solar UV radiation. Since 1993 he participated in the Norwegian involvement's in preparing the EUV spectrometers CDS and SUMER on Solar and Heliospheric Observatory (SOHO) and was in charge of developing analysis software for CDS. After the launch of SOHO in December 1995 he was part of the science operation team at NASA Goddard Space Flight Center. In 1999 he joined the European Space Agency (ESA) as the SOHO Deputy Project Scientist stationed at NASA/Goddard Space Flight Center. He was also in charge of outreach and media activities, making SOHO to one of the most well known current satellite projects.

He is now a senior advisor at the Norwegian Space Agency. He is a Norwegian delegate to the ESA Science Programme Committee (SPC), Programme Board of Human Spaceflight, Microgravity and Exploration (HEM) and Situational Awareness (SSA). He is also a delegate to the International Living With a Star (ILWS).

Served on several NASA Review Panels and as referee for various scientific journals. Professional publications: Refereed Journals – 42, Proceedings – 69, Popular Science – 22. Numerous appearances in national and international news-networks (CNN, USA Today, Der Spiegel, BBC etc.). International recognized lecturer on the Sun, The Sun Earth connection and the Northern Lights.

He has published several popular science books:

- Den store boken om astronomi
- Sola – Vår livgivende stjerne
- Our Explosive Sun
- 2013: Nordlyset – en guide (Forlaget Press). Historien om Nordlyset og en guide til hvordan oppleve og ta bilder av Nordlyset.
- 2013: The Northern Lights – a Guide (Forlaget Press).
- 2013: Il Sole (Daedalus Edition). Italian version of "Our Explosive Sun".
- 2013: Le Soleil, notre étoile (CNRS Editions). French version of "Our Explosive Sun".

== Honors ==
- Fulbright Fellowship (1994)
- European Space Agency Exceptional Achievement Award (2002)
- International Academy of Astronautics Laural Team Achievement Award (2003)
