= Rune Molberg =

Norwegian ice hockey player

- Born: 21 November 1952 Oslo, Norway
- Played for: Norwegian Olympics ice hockey team
- NHL draft: Undrafted

Rune Molberg (born November 21, 1952) is a former Norwegian ice hockey player. He was born in Oslo, Norway and played for the club Manglerud Star. He played for the Norwegian national ice hockey team at the 1980 Winter Olympics. In the last game of the tournament against Romania, Molberg assisted on a goal and scored one of his own with only 29 seconds remaining. This salvaged a tie, but did not help his team make the medal round.
