= Signy Fardal =

Norwegian magazine editor

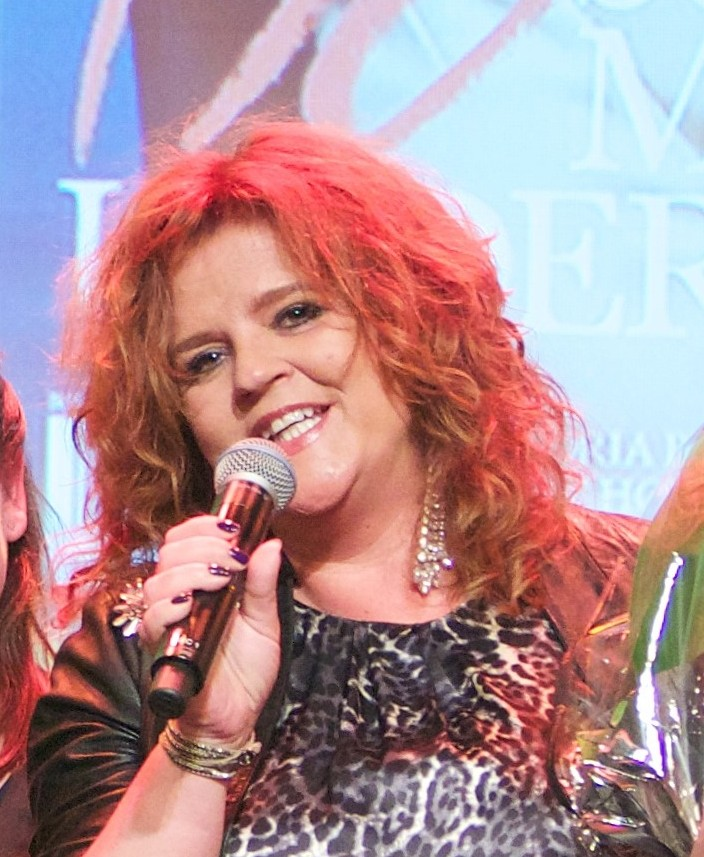
Signy Fardal

Signy Fardal (born 29 August 1961) is a Norwegian magazine editor.

Since 1998 she is the editor-in-chief of the Norwegian version of Elle. She graduated from the University of Oslo in 1984, worked as a journalist for Dagbladet from 1984 to 1986 and for Dagens Næringsliv from 1986 to 1998. She also manages the company that publishes Elle in Norway.
