= Carl Morten Amundsen =

Norwegian drama advisor and theatre director

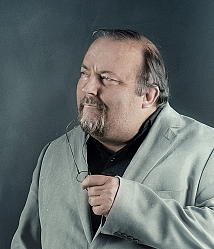
- Born: 11 January 1961 (age 64); Bergen, Norway
- Occupation(s): Dramaturg and theatre director
- Organization(s): Nationaltheatret; Teatret Vårt; Norsk Teaterlederforum

Carl Morten Amundsen (born 11 January 1961 in Bergen) is a Norwegian dramaturg and theatre director.

He was dramaturg for Nationaltheatret from 1993 to 2000, and was theatre director at Teatret Vårt in Molde from 2000 to 2011. He has been manager for Norsk Teaterlederforum from 2003. He has also worked for the Carrousel Theater an der Parkaue in Berlin.
