= Leif Solheim =

Norwegian ice hockey player (1932–2024)

Personal information
- Full name: Leif Sigurd Solheim
- Born: 14 July 1932 Oslo, Norway
- Died: 12 July 2024 (aged 91)

Sport
- Sport: Ice hockey
- Club: Furuset IF
Medal record
Men's ice hockey
Representing Norway
European Championships
Bronze medal – third place	1951 Paris	Team

Leif Sigurd Solheim (14 July 1932 – 12 July 2024) was a Norwegian ice hockey player. His achievements include winning a bronze medal with Norway at the 1951 Ice Hockey European Championships. He was awarded Gullpucken in 1959.

== Career ==
Solheim played for Furuset IF and the Norway national team, and participated at the Winter Olympics in 1952. He won a bronze medal with Norway at the 1951 Ice Hockey European Championships in Paris.

He was awarded Gullpucken as best Norwegian ice hockey player in 1959, and was the first recipient of the prize.

== Personal life and death ==
Born in Oslo on 14 July 1932, Solheim was a brother of Olympian ice hockey player Øivind Solheim.

Solheim died on 12 July 2024, at the age of 91.
