= Anton Wembacher =

German luger (born 1955)

Personal information
- Nationality: German
- Born: 15 September 1955 (age 69); Berchtesgaden, West Germany

Sport
- Sport: Luge

Anton Wembacher (born 15 September 1955) is a German luger. He competed in the men's singles and doubles events at the 1980 Winter Olympics.
