= Nils Nilsen =

Norwegian ice hockey player

Personal information
- Born: 29 December 1952 (age 73) Oslo, Norway

Sport
- Sport: Ice hockey
- Club: IF Frisk Asker

Nils Nilsen (born 29 December 1952) is a Norwegian former ice hockey player. He was born in Oslo, Norway and played for the club IF Frisk Asker. He played for the Norwegian national ice hockey team at the 1980 Winter Olympics.
