= Eirik Solheim =

Eirik Johan Solheim
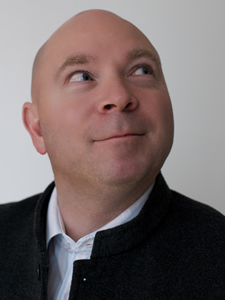
- Born: 20 August 1960 (age 65)
- Occupation: Professor in orthopaedic surgery

Eirik Johan Solheim (born August 20, 1960) is a Norwegian professor in orthopaedic surgery at the University of Bergen in Norway. Eirik Johan Solheim defended his doctoral thesis Effects of Bioerodible Polyorthoester on Heterotopic and Orthotopic Bone Induction in Rats at the University of Oslo in 1993. He did his specialist training for orthopedic surgery at Hagavik Hospital, Haukeland Universitetssykehus og Haraldsplass Deaconess Hospital.

Dr. Solheim has authored or co-authored three books and about 90 scholarly articles and monographs on various orthopedic topics. Much of his scientific work relates to osteogenesis, articular cartilage lesions and articular cartilage repair surgery.
