= Per Axel Koch =

Norwegian media executive

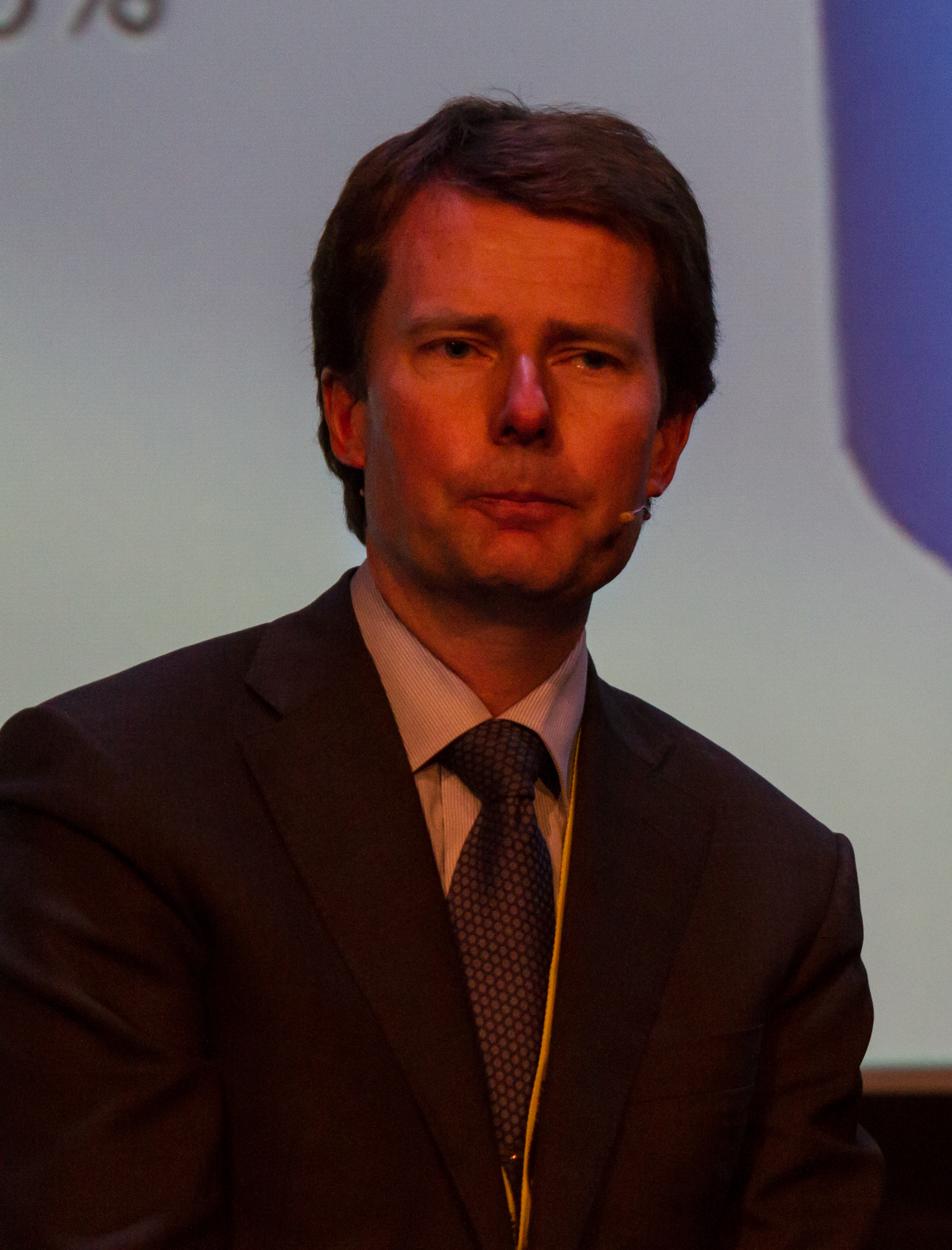
- Born: 29 January 1961 (age 65); Farsund, Norway
- Education: Norwegian School of Economics
- Occupation: Media executive

Per Axel Koch (born 29 January 1961) is a Norwegian media executive. He is the chief executive officer of Polaris Media.

== Career ==
Born in Farsund, Koch was educated at the Norwegian School of Economics. He started his newspaper career in 1991, when he assumed various administrative positions in Adresseavisen. Being the CEO of Adresseavisen, he was among the founders of the media group Polaris Media in 2008. The group is the third largest media company in Norway, behind Schibsted and Amedia.

In addition to being chairman of the board of the major subsidiaries of Polaris Media, Koch is also chairman of the board of the transport company AtB, the energy company Fjordkraft, and Midt-Norsk Jazzsenter. He was former chairman of the radio station Kanal 24, and the savings bank SpareBank 1 SMN.
