= Jørgen Sigurd Lien =

Norwegian software businessman

Mechanical cash register manufactured by the Norwegian brand Regna (produced by Jørgen S. Lien in Bergen) dating from around the 1950s.

Jørgen Sigurd Lien is the co-founder, and CEO of eHelp Corporation (formerly known as Blue Sky Software). eHelp Corporation was the worldwide leader in Help authoring solutions before it was acquired by Macromedia, Inc. in 2003.

== Early life and education ==
Jorgen Lien, who was born in Bergen to parents Terje Lien (father) and Inger Lise Lien (mother), had an early exposure to entrepreneurship. His paternal grandfather was Jørgen Sigurd Lien, Sr., co-founder and director of Jørgen S. Lien AS, one of the pioneer companies in Norway producing cash registers and safes.

Lien attended school at Snarøya, Lysaker and Stabekk. Thereafter, Lien trained at the Norwegian Air Force Academy and graduated as one of the top officers. Lien also won the Norwegian Judo Championship twice.

He is the alumnus of University of California, Santa Barbara. While at University of California, he earned his bachelor's degree summa cum laude in Electrical Engineering. He won the Mortar Board Award for being the top graduating student and achieving a 3.96 grade point average. Lien then undertook graduate research in parallel processing and artificial intelligence, and completed his master's degree in Electrical and Computer Engineering.

== Career ==
Prior to co-founding eHelp Corporation, Lien was the manager of the Windows Development team at Norsk Data in Norway, and has been involved with Windows development since Windows 1.0

Lien served as the president and CEO of eHelp Corporation from the mid-1990s until September 1999 alongside co-founder Trond Bergquist.

From 2001 eHelp was acquired by Macromedia, Inc., itself later acquired by Adobe Inc. in 2005.

His ability to forecast industry trends has enabled him to position eHelp Corporation and its products ahead of the technological curve, which is critical to continued success in the rapidly evolving software industry. Lien's vision, personal leadership and motivational skills have underpinned the dramatic growth of eHelp Corporation in terms of both personnel and revenues, and have helped the company avoid the pitfalls experienced by many high-tech companies that undergo rapid expansion.

In the competitive software industry, Lien has led eHelp Corporation to become a multimillion-dollar corporation with 37% compound growth in revenues over the past five years and 40 consecutive profitable quarters. Up until 1999, these accomplishments were achieved without any outside investment, as the company was completely self-funded through its own growth.

In 1999, eHelp attracted investment worth around $19 million from venture capital firms HarbourVest and Geocapital Partners, to help fund the ongoing growth of the company and the development of exciting new Internet-oriented technologies and products.

Under Lien's leadership, eHelp Corporation achieved twelve years of profitable growth. In 2003, Macromedia, Inc. acquired eHelp Corporation - the majority shareholders of eHelp Corporation were HarbourVest and Geocapital Partners . Robert M. Wadsworth from HarbourVest and Lawrence W. Lepard from Geocapital Partners were eHelp Corporation's board members.

=== Awards and honors ===
In 2000, Lien was one of ten business people who received an "Ernst and Young Entrepreneur of the Year: San Diego Region" award.

Lien's firm Blue Sky Software Corp. has been honored as a “1997 Developer of the Year” finalist, by the Software Council of Southern California.

In 1999, eHelp Corporation was named the 33rd fastest growing technology company in Southern California by Deloitte & Touche, due to its outstanding average annual revenue growth of 304.7% over a five-year period.

In 2002, eHelp Corporation has been selected by the Association of Support Professionals as a winner of the "Ten Best Web Support Sites of 2002" award.

In 2003, eHelp Corporation received the Brandon Hall Excellence in Learning Gold Award under the 'Innovative Technology' category.

== Philanthropy ==
In 2002, Lien's software firm eHelp contributed a total of US$12,000,000 worth in RoboDemo(R) eLearning Edition tutorial software to accredited colleges and universities through its Academic Software Donation Program.

In 2003, eHelp contributed a total of $75,000 donation in retail value of eHelp's RoboDemo eLearning Edition software to University of California through the California Institute for Telecommunications and Information Technology [Cal-(IT)²].
