= Ove Lemicka =

Norwegian politician (born 1961)

Ove Lemicka (born 31 May 1961) is a Norwegian politician for the Labour Party.

He served as a deputy representative to the Norwegian Parliament from Hordaland during the terms 1989–1993 and 1993–1997. In total he met during 11 days of parliamentary session.
