= Wolfgang Müller (skier) =

German cross-country skier (born 1955)

Personal information
- Nationality: German
- Born: 19 July 1955 (age 69); Wallenfels, West Germany

Sport
- Sport: Cross-country skiing

Wolfgang Müller (born 19 July 1955) is a German cross-country skier. He competed in the men's 15 kilometre event at the 1980 Winter Olympics.
