= Espen Bergh =

Norwegian judge

Espen Bergh (born 1961) is a Norwegian judge.

He was born in Oslo, and graduated with the cand.jur. degree in 1987. In 1989 he was hired in the Ministry of Justice, and after a tenure as deputy judge in Ytre Follo from 1992 to 1994 he continued in the Ministry until 1999. He moved to the law firm Wiersholm before serving as a judge in Borgarting Court of Appeal from 2005. He was appointed as a Supreme Court Justice in 2016.
