= Stephen Foyn =

Norwegian ice hockey player

- Born: June 23, 1959 (age 67) Karlstad, Sweden
- Height: 5 ft 11 in (180 cm)
- Weight: 185 lb (84 kg; 13 st 3 lb)
- Position: Left wing
- Played for: Färjestad BK; Timrå IK; Sparta Sarpsborg
- National team: Norway
- NHL draft: Undrafted
- Playing career: 1979–1991

Stephen Kjell Foyn (born June 23, 1959) is a Norwegian ice hockey player. He played for the Norwegian national ice hockey team, and participated at the Winter Olympics in 1980, 1984, and 1988.

Foyn was Norwegian champion with the club Sparta in 1984 and 1989. He was awarded Gullpucken as best Norwegian ice hockey player in 1990.
