= Harald Krüll =

German ice hockey player

Personal information
- Nationality: German
- Born: 8 February 1957 (age 68); Willich, West Germany

Sport
- Sport: Ice hockey

Harald Krüll (born 8 February 1957) is a German ice hockey player. He competed in the men's tournament at the 1980 Winter Olympics.
