= Kai Arne Engelstad =

Norwegian speed skater

Personal information
- Born: 21 December 1954 (age 71) Oslo, Norway

Sport
- Sport: Speed skating
Medal record
Men's speed skating
Representing Norway
Olympic Games
Bronze medal – third place	1984 Sarajevo	1,000 m
World Sprint Championships
Bronze medal – third place	1984 Trondheim	Sprint

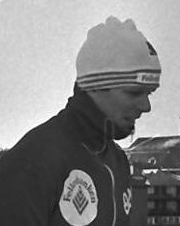
Kai Arne Engelstad in 1983

Kai Arne Engelstad (born 21 December 1954, in Oslo) is a former speed skater from Norway.

Engelstad specialised on the sprint, with his strongest distance being the 1,000 m. He had his best year in 1984 when he became Norwegian Sprint Champion for the third time, won bronze on the 1,000 m at the Winter Olympics of Sarajevo, and won another bronze medal when he finished third at the World Sprint Championships in Trondheim. Engelstad represented the club Aktiv SK.

== Medals ==
An overview of medals won by Engelstad at important championships he participated in, listing the years in which he won each:

Championships	Gold medal	Silver medal	Bronze medal
Winter Olympics	–	–	1984 (1,000 m)
World Sprint	–	–	1984
World Cup	–	–	–
Norwegian Sprint	1977; 1983; 1984	1978; 1979; 1985	1981; 1982

== Personal records ==
To put these personal records in perspective, the WR column lists the official world records on the dates that Engelstad skated his personal records.

Event	Result	Date	Venue	WR
500 m	38.14	4 March 1984	Trondheim	36.57
1,000 m	1:14.69	17 March 1983	Medeo	1:13.39
1,500 m	1:59.46	15 January 1984	Kongsberg	1:54.26
3,000 m	4:23.0	17 November 1978	Inzell	4:07.01
5,000 m	7:40.16	14 January 1984	Kongsberg	6:54.55
10,000 m	17:32.3	15 March 1984	Oslo	14:23.59

Engelstad has an Adelskalender score of 176.591 points.
