= Morten Sethereng =

Norwegian ice hockey player

- Born: 15 January 1953 (age 73) Trondheim, Norway
- Played for: Frisk Asker
- National team: Norway

Morten Sethereng (born 15 January 1953) is a Norwegian ice hockey player. He played 71 official matches for the Norwegian national ice hockey team, and participated at the Winter Olympics in 1972 and 1980. He was awarded Gullpucken in 1979.
