= Henry Nilsen =

Norwegian speed skater

Personal information
- Nationality: Norwegian
- Born: 12 April 1961 (age 63); Trondheim

Sport
- Sport: Speed skating
- Club: Kongsvinger IL

Henry Nilsen (born 12 April 1961) is a Norwegian speed skater. He was born in Trondheim, and represented the club Kongsvinger IL. He competed at the 1984 Winter Olympics in Sarajevo.
