= Frank Vestreng =

Norwegian ice hockey player

Frank Rune Vestreng (born August 19, 1961) is a former Norwegian ice hockey player. He was born in Oslo, Norway, and played for the club Vålerengens IF. He played for the Norwegian national ice hockey team at the 1984 Winter Olympics.
