= Martin Wild =

German ice hockey player

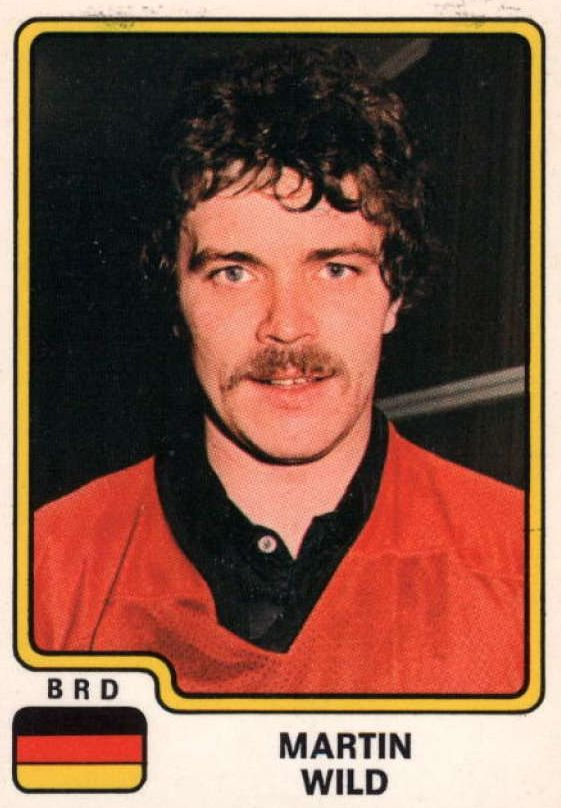

Personal information
- Nationality: German
- Born: 2 December 1952 (age 72); Garmisch-Partenkirchen, West Germany

Sport
- Sport: Ice hockey

Martin Wild (born 2 December 1952) is a German ice hockey player. He competed in the men's tournaments at the 1972 Winter Olympics and the 1980 Winter Olympics.
