= Marcus Kuhl =

German ice hockey player

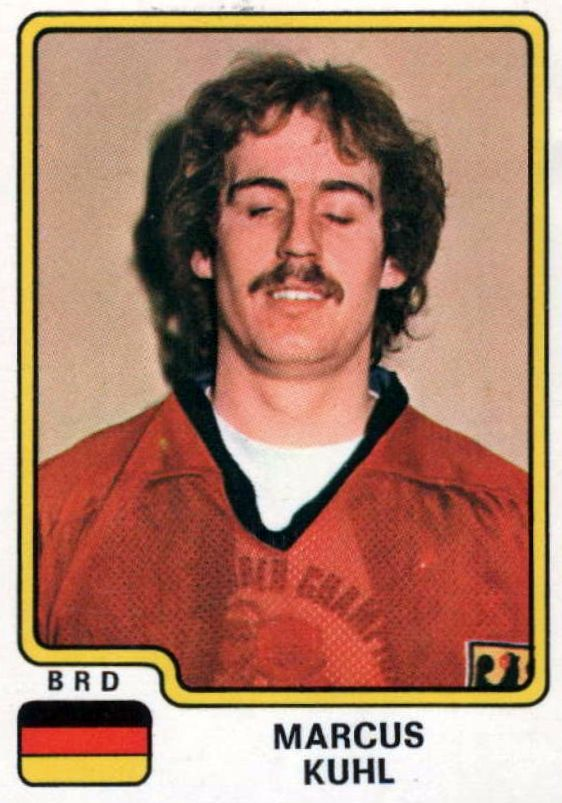

Personal information
- Nationality: German
- Born: 15 March 1956 (age 69); Mannheim, West Germany

Sport
- Sport: Ice hockey

Marcus Kuhl (born 15 March 1956) is a German ice hockey player. He competed in the men's tournaments at the 1980 Winter Olympics and the 1984 Winter Olympics.
