= Ernst Höfner (ice hockey) =

German ice hockey player

Personal information
- Nationality: German
- Born: 21 September 1957 (age 67); Augsburg, West Germany

Sport
- Sport: Ice hockey

Ernst Höfner (born 21 September 1957) is a German ice hockey player. He competed in the men's tournaments at the 1980 Winter Olympics and the 1984 Winter Olympics.
