= Uli Egen =

German ice hockey player

Personal information
- Nationality: German
- Born: 24 August 1956 (age 68); Füssen, West Germany

Sport
- Sport: Ice hockey

Uli Egen (born 24 August 1956) is a German ice hockey player. He competed in the men's tournament at the 1980 Winter Olympics.
