= Knut Andresen =

Norwegian ice hockey player

Personal information
- Full name: Knut Henning Andresen
- Born: 2 June 1959 (age 66) Asker, Norway
- Height: 172 cm (5 ft 8 in)
- Weight: 84 kg (185 lb)

Sport
- Sport: Ice hockey

Knut Henning Andresen (born 2 June 1959) is a former Norwegian ice hockey player. He was born in Asker. He played for the Norwegian national ice hockey team at the 1980 Winter Olympics.
