= Vladimír Vacátko =

German ice hockey player

Personal information
- Nationality: German
- Born: 15 September 1952; Liberec, Czechoslovakia
- Died: 10 September 2016 (aged 63); Duisburg, Germany

Sport
- Sport: Ice hockey

Vladimír Vacátko (15 September 1952 – 10 September 2016) was a German ice hockey player. He competed in the men's tournament at the 1980 Winter Olympics.
