= Bohuslav Ebermann =

Czech ice hockey player

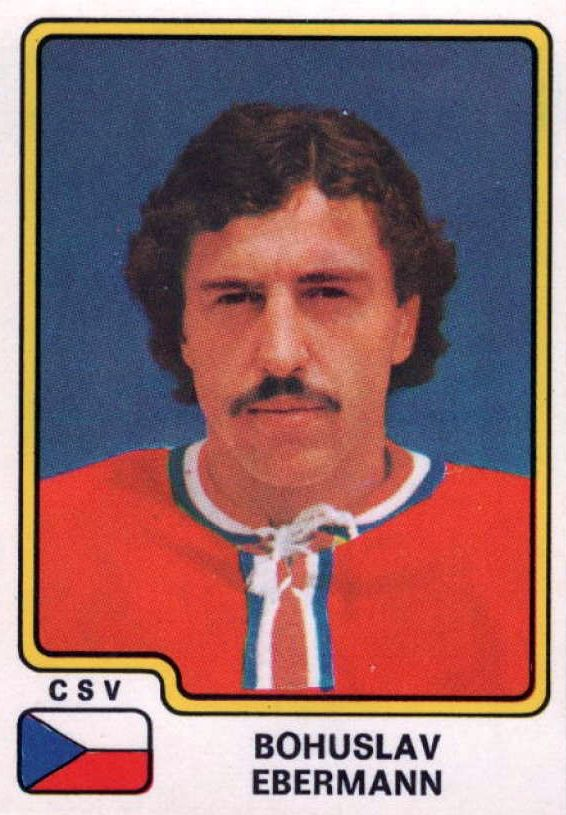
- Born: 19 September 1948 (age 78) Vochov, Czechoslovakia
- Height: 6 ft 0 in (183 cm)
- Weight: 183 lb (83 kg; 13 st 1 lb)
- Position: Left wing
- Shot: Left
- Played for: HC Plzeň; HC Dukla Jihlava; Lausanne HC; Grenoble; HC Sion
- National team: Czechoslovakia
- Playing career: 1966–1990; 1995–1996
Medal record
Men's ice hockey
Representing Czechoslovakia
Olympic Games
Silver medal – second place	1976 Innsbruck	Team

Bohuslav Ebermann (born 19 September 1948) is a Czech retired professional ice hockey player who played in the Czechoslovak Extraliga. He played for Škoda Plzeň. He was a member of the Czechoslovak 1976 Canada Cup team and was a silver medalist at the 1976 Winter Olympics. He also played in the 1980 Winter Olympics, and captained the Czechoslovak team to fifth place out of twelve. He scored three goals and added an assist in the tournament.
