= Odd Sørli =

Norwegian alpine skier (born 1954)

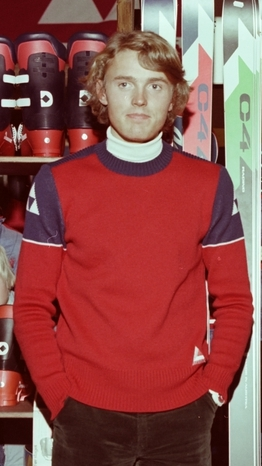
- Sørli in 1977

Personal information
- Born: 29 November 1954 (age 71) Copenhagen, Denmark
- Height: 185 cm (6 ft 1 in)
- Weight: 78 kg (172 lb)

Sport
- Sport: Alpine skiing
- Club: Oppdal IL

Odd Sørli (born 29 November 1954) is a Danish-born Norwegian retired alpine skier. He competed for Norway at the 1976, 1980 and 1984 Winter Olympics with the best result of 19th place in the giant slalom in 1984.

After retiring from competitions Sørli worked as a journalist for Se og Hør, and in 1996 co-founded the company Off Piste, which organizes parties and adventure trips.
