= Håkon Lundenes =

Norwegian ice hockey player

Håkon Lundenes (born 2 January 1954) is a former Norwegian ice hockey player. He was born in Oslo and played for the club Furuset IF. He played for the Norwegian national ice hockey team at the 1980 Winter Olympics.
