= Peter Scharf =

German ice hockey player

Personal information
- Nationality: German
- Born: 15 July 1953 (age 71); Bad Tölz, West Germany

Sport
- Sport: Ice hockey

Peter Scharf (born 15 July 1953) is a German ice hockey player. He competed in the men's tournaments at the 1980 Winter Olympics and the 1984 Winter Olympics.
