= Øivind Løsåmoen =

Norwegian ice hockey player

Øivind Løsåmoen (born 13 October 1957) is a former Norwegian ice hockey player. He was born in Oslo and played for the clubs Furuset IF and Storhamar IL. He played for the Norwegian national ice hockey team at the 1980 and 1984 Winter Olympics. He won the Norwegian Ice Hockey Association Golden Puck in 1984, as best club and national team player of the year.
