= Hermann Hinterstocker =

German ice hockey player

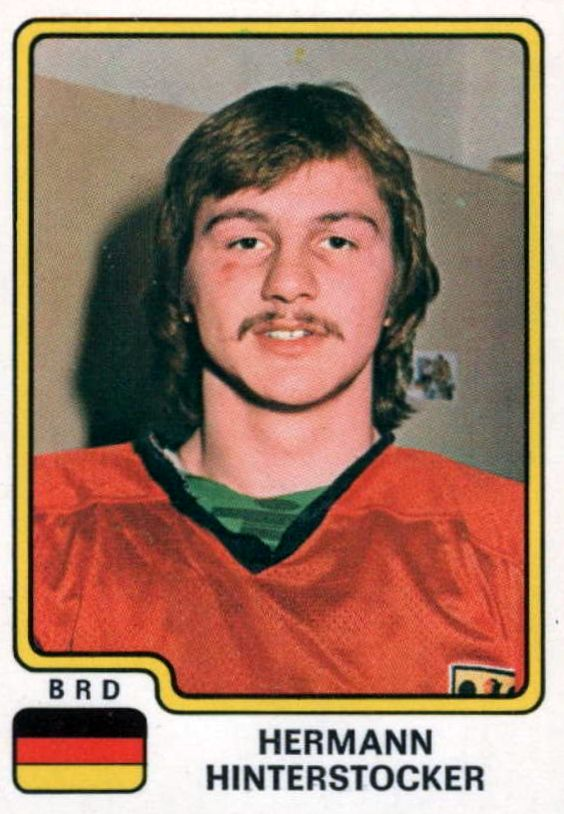

Personal information
- Nationality: German
- Born: 21 June 1956 (age 68); Holzkirchen, West Germany

Sport
- Sport: Ice hockey

Hermann Hinterstocker (born 21 June 1956) is a German former ice hockey player. He competed in the men's tournament at the 1980 Winter Olympics.
