= Horst-Peter Kretschmer =

German ice hockey player

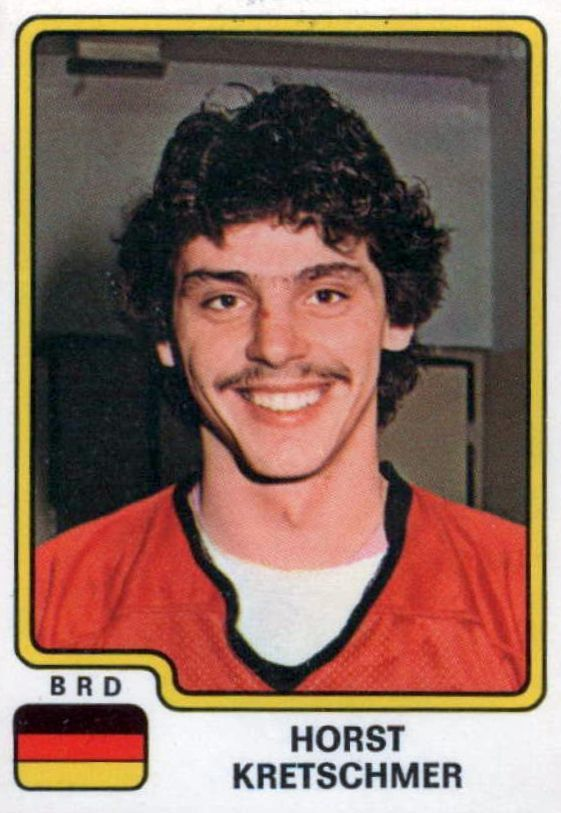

Personal information
- Nationality: German
- Born: 19 October 1955; Bad Tölz, West Germany
- Died: 24 April 2015 (aged 59); Bad Tölz, Germany

Sport
- Sport: Ice hockey

Horst-Peter Kretschmer (19 October 1955 – 24 April 2015) was a German ice hockey player. He competed in the men's tournaments at the 1980 Winter Olympics and the 1988 Winter Olympics.
