= Vidar Johansen (ice hockey) =

Norwegian ice hockey player

Personal information
- Born: 17 December 1951 (age 74) Asker, Norway

Sport
- Sport: Ice hockey

Vidar Johansen (born 17 December 1951) is a Norwegian former ice hockey player. He was born in Asker, Norway and represented the club Frisk Asker. He played for the Norwegian national ice hockey team at the 1980 Winter Olympics.
