= Øystein Jarlsbo =

Norwegian ice hockey player

Øystein Jarlsbo (born 7 March 1961) is a former Norwegian ice hockey player. He was born in Oslo, Norway. He played for the Norwegian national ice hockey team at the 1980 and 1984 Winter Olympics.
