= Geir Myhre =

Norwegian ice hockey player and coach

- Born: 7 April 1954 Oslo, Norway
- Died: 22 July 2016 (aged 62) Mallorca, Spain
- Height: 6 ft 0 in (183 cm)
- Weight: 181 lb (82 kg; 12 st 13 lb)
- Position: Right wing
- Shot: Left
- Played for: Hasle-Løren IL; Vålerenga; Sparta Sarpsborg
- National team: Norway
- Playing career: 1975–1983

Geir Tore Myhre (7 April 1954 – 22 July 2016) was a Norwegian ice hockey player and coach. He played for the Norwegian national ice hockey team, and participated in the Winter Olympics in 1980 and 1984. Myrhe scored two goals in his Olympic ice hockey career, both against the United States: he gave Norway a 1–0 lead against the Americans in the first period of their 1980 match-up, only to watch Team USA come back to win 5-1 en route to the gold medal. Four years later, Myrhe scored in a 3–3 tie versus the USA.

Myrhe played for three Norwegian champion clubs, in 1976, 1982 and 1984, and was awarded Gullpucken as best Norwegian ice hockey player in 1980 and 1982. After retiring as a player, he coached the Norwegian national team from 1994 to 1996.

Myhre died suddenly on July 22, 2016, at the age of 62 while on holiday in Spain.
