= Ice hockey at the 1980 Winter Olympics =

Tournament details
- Host country: United States
- Venue(s): Olympic Fieldhouse, Olympic Arena; Lake Placid, New York
- Dates: February 12–24, 1980
- Teams: 12

Final positions
- Champions: United States (2nd title)
- Runners-up: Soviet Union
- Third place: Sweden
- Fourth place: Finland

Tournament statistics
- Games played: 35
- Goals scored: 308 (8.8 per game)
- Scoring leader: (Czechoslovakia) Milan Nový (15 points)

The men's ice hockey tournament at the 1980 Winter Olympics in Lake Placid, United States, was the 14th Olympic Championship. Twelve teams competed in the tournament, which was held from February 12 to 24, 1980. The United States won its second gold medal, including a win over the heavily favored Soviet Union that became known as the "Miracle on Ice". Games were held at the Olympic Fieldhouse (8,000) and the Olympic Arena (2,500).

== Format ==
The IIHF ceased running a World championship in Olympic years. Nations that did not participate in the Lake Placid Olympics were invited to compete in the inaugural Thayer Tutt Trophy in Ljubljana, Yugoslavia.

Going into the games, the teams were ranked and divided into two groups. Teams were ranked based on performance during the 1979 World Ice Hockey Championships. Included were the eight teams in the 1979 top Championship Division (Pool "A") as well as the top four teams in the 1979, second-tier, "B" Pool tournament. While Poland finished 8th place in Pool A, the Netherlands, winners of Pool B, were ranked 8th while Poland was ranked 9th going into the Olympics. The total ranking was: Soviet Union (1), Czechoslovakia (2), Sweden (3), Canada (4), Finland (5), West Germany (6), United States (7), Netherlands (8), Poland (9), Romania (10), Norway (11), Japan (12). East Germany was originally ranked tenth, but declined to participate, with Japan filling their spot.

== Overview ==
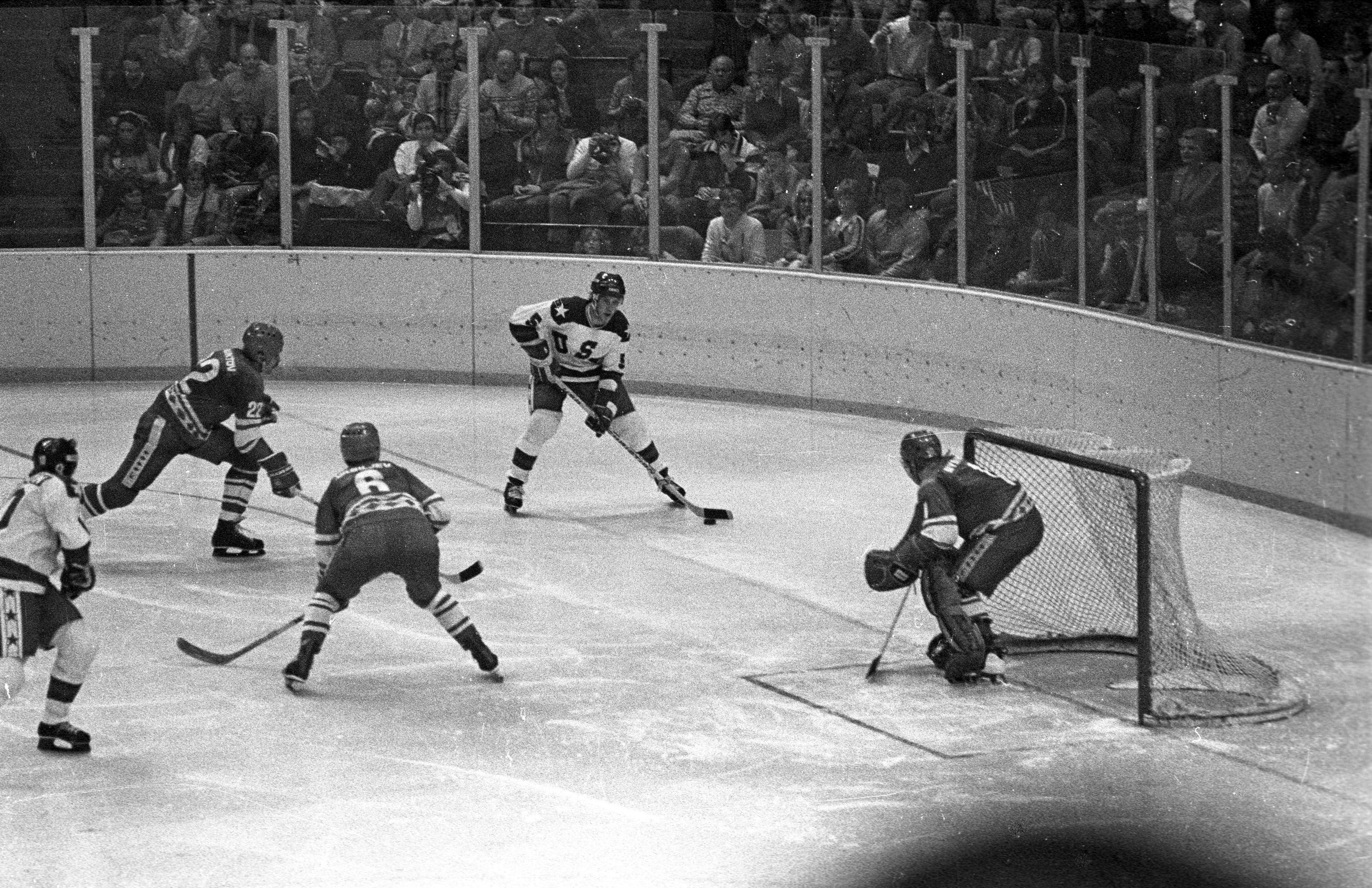
United States vs. Soviet Union at the 1980 Winter Olympics

The Soviet Union had won the gold medal in five of the six previous Winter Olympic Games, and were the favorites to win once more in Lake Placid. The team consisted primarily of professional players with significant experience in international play. By contrast, the United States' team—led by head coach Herb Brooks—consisted exclusively of amateur players, and was the youngest team in the tournament and in U.S. national team history. In the group stage, both the Soviet and U.S. teams were unbeaten; the U.S. achieved several notable results, including a 2–2 draw against Sweden, and a 7–3 upset victory over second-place favorites Czechoslovakia.

For the first game in the medal round, the United States played the Soviets. Finishing the first period tied at 2–2, and the Soviets leading 3–2 following the second, the U.S. team scored two more goals to take their first lead during the third and final period, winning the game 4–3. Following the game, the U.S. went on to clinch the gold medal by beating Finland in their last game. The Soviet Union took the silver medal by beating Sweden.

The victory became one of the most iconic moments of the Games and in U.S. sports. Equally well-known was the television call of the final seconds of the game by Al Michaels for ABC, in which he declared: "Do you believe in miracles?! YES!" In 1999, Sports Illustrated named the "Miracle on Ice" the top sports moment of the 20th century. As part of its centennial celebration in 2008, the International Ice Hockey Federation (IIHF) named the "Miracle on Ice" as the best international ice hockey story of the past 100 years.

== Medalists ==
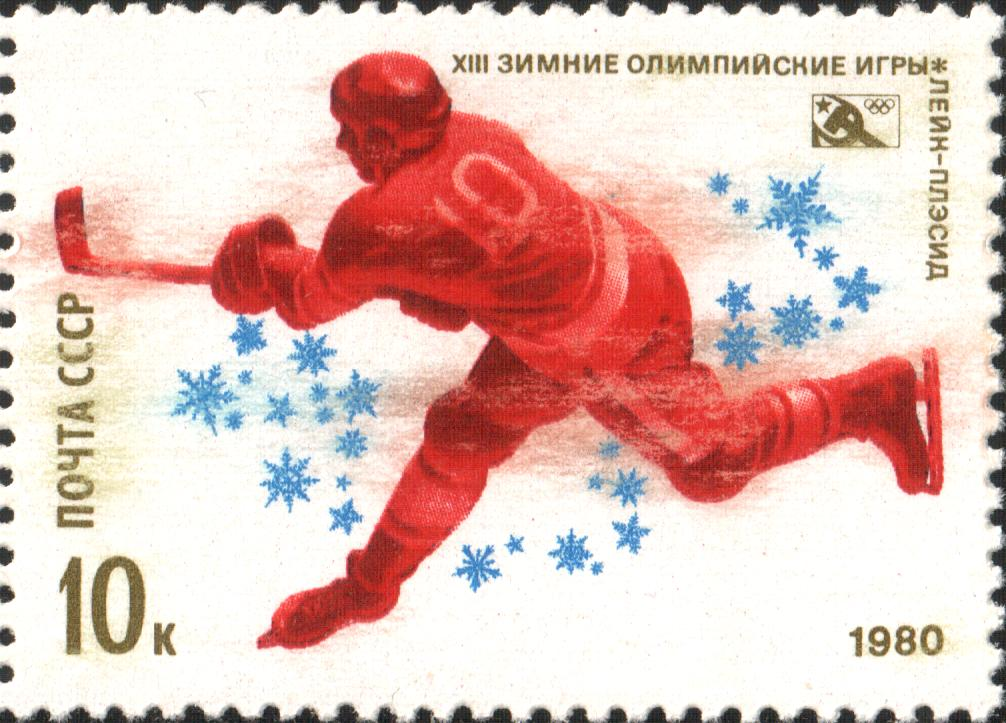
A postage stamp issued by the Soviet Post Office for the 1980 Lake Placid Winter Olympic Games. The Soviet Union had won the previous four Olympic ice hockey tournaments between 1964 and 1976.

Gold	Silver	Bronze
United States Bill Baker; Neal Broten; Dave Christian; Steve Christoff; Jim Craig; Mike Eruzione; John Harrington; Steve Janaszak; Mark Johnson; Rob McClanahan; Ken Morrow; Jack O'Callahan; Mark Pavelich; Mike Ramsey; Buzz Schneider; Dave Silk; Eric Strobel; Bob Suter; Phil Verchota; Mark Wells	Soviet Union Helmuts Balderis; Zinetula Bilyaletdinov; Viacheslav Fetisov; Alexander Golikov; Vladimir Golikov; Alexei Kasatonov; Valeri Kharlamov; Vladimir Krutov; Yuri Lebedev; Sergei Makarov; Alexander Maltsev; Boris Mikhailov; Vladimir Myshkin; Vasili Pervukhin; Vladimir Petrov; Alexander Skvortsov; Sergei Starikov; Vladislav Tretiak; Valeri Vasiliev; Viktor Zhluktov	Sweden Mats Åhlberg; Sture Andersson; Bo Berglund; Håkan Eriksson; Jan Eriksson; Thomas Eriksson; Leif Holmgren; Tomas Jonsson; Pelle Lindbergh; William Löfqvist; Harald Lückner; Bengt Lundholm; Per Lundqvist; Lars Molin; Mats Näslund; Lennart Norberg; Tommy Samuelsson; Dan Söderström; Mats Waltin; Ulf Weinstock

== First round ==
=== Blue Division ===
Team	Pld	W	L	D	GF	GA	GD	Pts	Qualification
Sweden	5	4	0	1	26	7	+19	9	Advanced to the final round
United States	5	4	0	1	25	10	+15	9	Advanced to the final round
Czechoslovakia	5	3	2	0	34	16	+18	6	Advanced to the consolation round
Romania	5	1	3	1	13	29	−16	3	
West Germany	5	1	4	0	21	30	−9	2	
Norway	5	0	4	1	9	36	−27	1	

Source: HockeyCanada.ca

All times are local (UTC–5).

12 February 1980; 13:16	Czechoslovakia	11–0 (0–0, 5–0, 6–0)	Norway	Olympic Arena, Lake Placid

Jiří Králík
Goalies
Thore Wålberg
Referee:
(Finland) Karl-Gustav Kaisla

Pouzar (Lukáč, Fryčer) – 25:33	1–0
Nový (Lukáč, Chalupa) – 31:11	2–0
M. Šťastný (P. Šťastný) – 33:00	3–0
Martinec (Chalupa, Novák) – 34:13	4–0
Ebermann (Novák, Chalupa) (PP) – 38:01	5–0
Pouzar (Nový, Lukáč) – 42:13	6–0
A. Šťastný (P. Šťastný, Ďuriš) – 43:16	7–0
Ebermann (Dvořák, Martinec) (PP) – 45:54	8–0
P. Šťastný (Bubla, M. Šťastný) – 48:33	9–0
Nový (Kadlec, Lukáč) – 52:51	10–0
P. Šťastný (M. Šťastný) – 54:47	11–0

10 min
Penalties
10 min
44
Shots
10

12 February 1980; 16:30	Romania	6–4 (1–1, 2–3, 3–0)	West Germany	Olympic Arena, Lake Placid

Valerian Netedu
Goalies
Sigmund Suttner
Referee:
(United States) Jim Neagles

Costea (Moroșan) (PP) – 05:15	1–0
	1–1	11:50 – Vacatko (Philipp, Krüll)
	1–2	22:37 – Truntschka (Egen, Kiessling)
Costea (E. Antal, Tureanu) (PP) – 24:46	2–2
	2–3	26:13 – Vacatko (Kuhl, Philipp)
	2–4	35:34 – Egen (Scharf) (PP)
Tureanu (Gal, Costea) – 37:46	3–4
Tureanu (Costea) – 44:12	4–4
Tureanu (Gal) – 46:30	5–4
Olenici – 53:17	6–4

16 min
Penalties
16 min
38
Shots
53

12 February 1980; 17:21	Sweden	2–2 (1–0, 0–1, 1–1)	United States	Olympic Fieldhouse, Lake Placid

Pelle Lindbergh
Goalies
Jim Craig
Referee:
(Soviet Union) Viktor Dombrovski

Andersson (Molin, Lundqvist) – 11:04	1–0
	1–1	39:32 – Silk (Ramsey, Johnson)
T. Eriksson (Lückner) – 44:45	2–1
	2–2	59:33 – Baker (Pavelich, Schneider) (EA)

8 min
Penalties
6 min
36
Shots
29

14 February 1980; 13:00	Romania	0–8 (0–3, 0–4, 0–1)	Sweden	Olympic Arena, Lake Placid

Valerian Netedu
Gheorghe Huțan
Goalies
William Löfqvist
Referee:
(Finland) Karl-Gustav Kaisla

0–1	00:40 – Åhlberg (Näslund)
0–2	05:59 – Lundqvist (Samuelsson, Berglund)
0–3	07:42 – J. Eriksson (Waltin)
0–4	21:50 – T. Eriksson (Söderström, Molin) (PP)
0–5	28:05 – Molin
0–6	32:31 – Molin (Berglund)
0–7	37:17 – Lundholm (H. Eriksson)
0–8	50:18 – Jonsson (Holmgren)

26 min
Penalties
15 min
19
Shots
44

14 February 1980; 13:30	Norway	4–10 (2–5, 1–3, 1–2)	West Germany	Olympic Fieldhouse, Lake Placid

Thore Wålberg
Jim Marthinsen
Goalies
Bernhard Englbrecht
Referee:
(Soviet Union) Viktor Dombrovski

Andresen (M. Johansen) – 6:03	1–0
	1–1	07:51 – Vacatko (Kuhl, Reil)
	1–2	08:49 – Kiessling (Truntschka, Meitinger)
	1–3	09:08 – Zach (Scharf, M. Hinterstocker)
	1–4	09:33 – Kretschmer (M. Hinterstocker, H. Hinterstocker)
	1–5	10:18 – Höfner (Reindl)
Falch Nilsen (Myhre) – 12:13	2–5
V. Johansen (Myhre) – 25:26	3–5
	3–6	30:52 – Truntschka (Krüll, Kiessling)
	3–7	34:01 – Vacatko (Philipp, Kuhl)
	3–8	39:53 – Truntschka (Egen, Meitinger)
	3–9	40:42 – Kuhl (Vacatko, Krüll)
	3–10	50:49 – Kretschmer (Wild, Scharf)
Sethereng (M. Johansen, Lundenes) – 52:41	4–10

13 min
Penalties
15 min
20
Shots
51

14 February 1980; 20:30	United States	7–3 (2–2, 2–0, 3–1)	Czechoslovakia	Olympic Fieldhouse, Lake Placid

Jim Craig
Goalies
Jiří Králík
Referee:
(Sweden) Ulf Lindgren

	0–1	02:23 – Pouzar (Kaberle, Nový)
Eruzione (Broten) – 4:39	1–1
Pavelich (Schneider, Harrington) – 5:45	2–1
	2–2	12:07 – M. Šťastný (P. Šťastný)
Schneider (Pavelich) – 24:33	3–2
Johnson (McClanahan) – 35:28	4–2
Verchota (Christian) – 42:59	5–2
Schneider (Harrington) – 43:59	6–2
	6–3	45:36 – Novák (Lukáč)
McClanahan (Johnson) – 50:54	7–3

10 min
Penalties
10 min
27
Shots
31

16 February 1980; 13:00	United States	5–1 (0–1, 3–0, 2–0)	Norway	Olympic Arena, Lake Placid

Jim Craig
Goalies
Jim Marthinsen
Referee:
(Finland) Karl-Gustav Kaisla

	0–1	04:19 – Myhre (Løsåmoen)
Eruzione (PP) – 20:41	1–1
Johnson (Christian, McClanahan) – 24:51	2–1
Silk (Pavelich, Morrow) – 33:31	3–1
Wells (Silk, Verchota) – 44:28	4–1
Morrow (McClanahan, Strobel) – 51:29	5–1

16 min
Penalties
18 min
43
Shots
22

16 February 1980; 13:00	Romania	2–7 (0–2, 1–3, 1–2)	Czechoslovakia	Olympic Fieldhouse, Lake Placid

Gheorghe Huțan
Valerian Netedu
Goalies
Karel Lang
Referee:
(West Germany) Josef Kompalla

	0–1	13:35 – P. Šťastný (Bubla, A. Šťastný)
	0–2	19:00 – Lukáč (Nový, Pouzar)
Cazacu (Hălăucă, Sólyom) – 21:39	1–2
	1–3	26:07 – Kadlec
	1–4	28:43 – Nový (Pouzar, Kaberle)
	1–5	33:41 – P. Šťastný
	1–6	41:46 – Lukáč (Neliba)
Cazacu (Gal) – 44:08	2–6
	2–7	45:46 – Pouzar (Lukáč, Nový)

6 min
Penalties
2 min
29
Shots
45

16 February 1980; 20:00	Sweden	5–2 (1–0, 4–1, 0–1)	West Germany	Olympic Arena, Lake Placid

Pelle Lindbergh
Goalies
Sigmund Suttner
Bernhard Englbrecht
Referee:
(Soviet Union) Viktor Dombrovski

Berglund (Molin, Lundqvist) – 09:52	1–0
Näslund (Åhlberg) – 26:50	2–0
Lundqvist (Berglund, Samuelsson) – 28:35	3–0
Söderström (Åhlberg) – 32:36	4–0
Söderström (H. Eriksson) (PP) – 36:03	5–0
	5–1	37:06 – Egen (Truntschka)
	5–2	56:43 – Reil (SH)

24 min
Penalties
31 min
33
Shots
25

18 February 1980; 13:30	Norway	1–7 (0–2, 0–4, 1–1)	Sweden	Olympic Fieldhouse, Lake Placid

Thore Wålberg
Goalies
William Löfqvist
Referee:
(Czechoslovakia) Vladimir Šubrt

	0–1	14:03 – Åhlberg (Näslund)
	0–2	16:20 – Åhlberg (Näslund, Holmgren)
	0–3	23:48 – Åhlberg (Jonsson) (PP)
	0–4	34:08 – Lundqvist (Lückner, Molin)
	0–5	36:40 – Norberg (H. Eriksson, Waltin)
	0–6	37:09 – Andersson (Lundqvist, Molin)
	0–7	43:24 – Näslund (Åhlberg, Weinstock) (PP)
Abrahamsen (Molberg, Foyn) – 51:08	1–7

8 min
Penalties
8 min
12
Shots
43

18 February 1980; 20:00	West Germany	3–11 (1–5, 0–5, 2–1)	Czechoslovakia	Olympic Arena, Lake Placid

Bernhard Englbrecht
Sigmund Suttner
Goalies
Jiří Králík
Referee:
(Finland) Karl-Gustav Kaisla

	0–1	01:33 – Nový (Ebermann) (PP)
	0–2	02:28 – P. Šťastný (A. Šťastný, M. Šťastný)
	0–3	05:45 – P. Šťastný (M. Šťastný) (SH)
Krüll (Truntschka, Kretschmer) – 19:04	1–3
	1–4	19:32 – Pouzar (Kaberle, Nový)
	1–5	19:49 – A. Šťastný (P. Šťastný)
	1–6	22:17 – Nový (Lukáč)
	1–7	27:10 – Pouzar (Fryčer, Nový)
	1–8	33:30 – Pouzar
	1–9	38:36 – Ebermann (Novák)
	1–10	39:22 – Nový (Pouzar)
M. Hinterstocker (Zach, Auhuber) – 46:28	2–10
Höfner (Kuhl, Philipp) – 48:36	3–10
	3–11	50:22 – P. Šťastný (M. Šťastný)

20 min
Penalties
19 min
22
Shots
39

18 February 1980; 20:30	United States	7–2 (2–0, 2–1, 3–1)	Romania	Olympic Fieldhouse, Lake Placid

Jim Craig
Goalies
Valerian Netedu
Gheorghe Huțan
Referee:
(Soviet Union) Viktor Dombrovski

Schneider (Pavelich, Harrington) – 12:03	1–0
Strobel (Schneider, Ramesy) – 15:52	2–0
Wells (Verchota, Morrow) – 29:34	3–0
	3–1	33:40 – Tureanu (Nistor) (PP)
Schneider (Harrington) – 37:05	4–1
Christoff (O'Callahan) (PP) – 43:14	5–1
	5–2	52:48 – Hălăucă (Moroșan)
Broten (Eruzione) – 56:12	6–2
McClanahan (Johnson) – 58:09	7–2

6 min
Penalties
10 min
51
Shots
21

20 February 1980; 13:00	Norway	3–3 (1–1, 0–1, 2–1)	Romania	Olympic Arena, Lake Placid

Jim Marthinsen
Goalies
Gheorghe Huțan
Referee:
(Czechoslovakia) Vladimir Šubrt

Foyn (Myhre, Falch Nilsen) (PP) – 00:56	1–0
	1–1	05:10 – Costea (E. Antal, Tureanu)
	1–2	31:27 – Gal (E. Antal, Axinte)
	1–3	52:43 – Tureanu (Gal)
Sethereng (Falch Nilsen, Molberg) (PP) – 58:39	2–3
Molberg (Myhre, Nilsen) – 59:31	3–3

26 min
Penalties
18 min
24
Shots
29

20 February 1980; 13:30	Czechoslovakia	2–4 (0–2, 0–1, 2–1)	Sweden	Olympic Fieldhouse, Lake Placid

Jiří Králík
Goalies
Pelle Lindbergh
Referee:
(Finland) Karl-Gustav Kaisla

	0–1	09:18 – Åhlberg (Näslund, Holmgren) (PP)
	0–2	10:55 – Holmgren (Näslund, Weinstock)
	0–3	36:02 – Näslund (Söderström) (PP)
Nový (Pouzar) – 52:05	1–3
	1–4	57:00 – Lundqvist (Näslund, Jonsson)
Pouzar (Nový, Kadlec) (PP) – 59:22	2–4

6 min
Penalties
10 min
43
Shots
26

20 February 1980; 20:30	West Germany	2–4 (2–0, 0–2, 0–2)	United States	Olympic Fieldhouse, Lake Placid

Sigmund Suttner
Goalies
Jim Craig
Referee:
(Canada) Bernie Haley

Kretschmer – 01:50	1–0
Kiessling (Höfner, Kretschmer) (PP) – 19:45	2–0
	2–1	27:40 – McClanahan (Johnson, Christian)
	2–2	38:31 – Broten (Strobel, Eruzione)
	2–3	41:17 – McClanahan (Johnson, Christian)
	2–4	44:17 – Verchota (Christian, Wells)

8 min
Penalties
16 min
26
Shots
32

=== Red Division ===
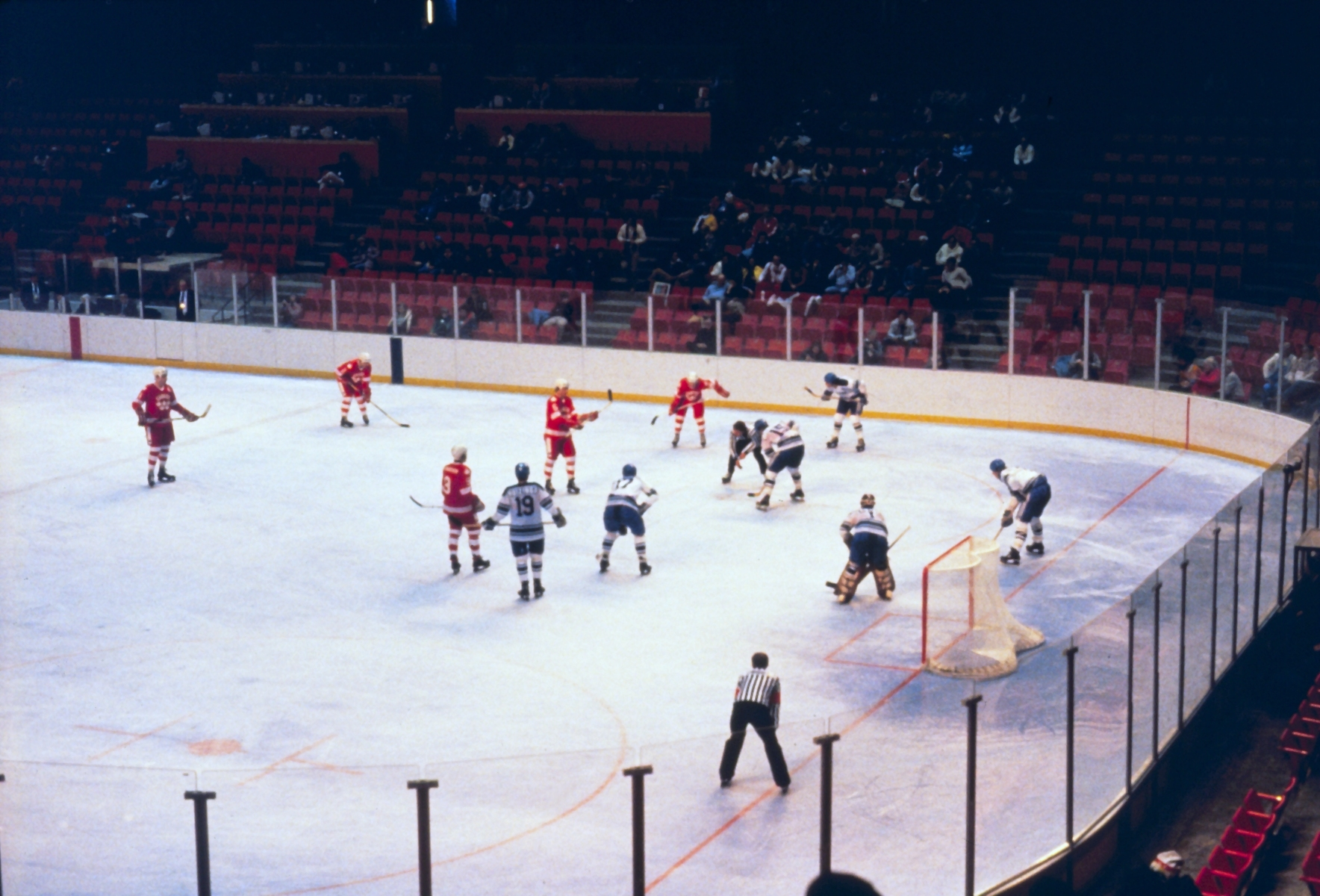
Canada vs. the Netherlands

Team	Pld	W	L	D	GF	GA	GD	Pts	Qualification
Soviet Union	5	5	0	0	51	11	+40	10	Advanced to the final round
Finland	5	3	2	0	26	18	+8	6	Advanced to the final round
Canada	5	3	2	0	28	12	+16	6	Advanced to the consolation round
Poland	5	2	3	0	15	23	−8	4	
Netherlands	5	1	3	1	16	43	−27	3	
Japan	5	0	4	1	7	36	−29	1	

Source: HockeyCanada.ca

All times are local (UTC–5).

12 February 1980; 13:30	Netherlands	1–10 (1–2, 0–2, 0–6)	Canada	Olympic Fieldhouse, Lake Placid

Ted Lenssen
Goalies
Bob Dupuis
Referee:
(Sweden) Ulf Lindgren

de Graauw (de Cloe) (SH) – 01:56	1–0
	1–1	04:04 – Primeau (Devaney)
	1–2	11:40–Berry (Maxwell, O'Malley)
	1–3	26:52 – D'Alvise (O'Malley)
	1–4	35:02 – Hindmarch (Devaney) (PP)
	1–5	43:31 – G. Anderson (Davidson, Nill)
	1–6	44:14 – D'Alvise (Zupancich, Pirie)
	1–7	50:35 – Devaney (Primeau, Hindmarch) (PP)
	1–8	51:11 – Berry (Watters, Maxwell)
	1–9	52:22 – Berry (Maxwell, MacLean)
	1–10	58:11 – Hindmarch (MacLean, Davidson)

16 min
Penalties
18 min
20
Shots
40

12 February 1980; 20:00	Poland	5–4 (1–0, 4–3, 0–1)	Finland	Olympic Arena, Lake Placid

Henryk Wojtynek
Goalies
Jorma Valtonen
Referee:
(Canada) Bernie Haley

Zabawa (Jobczyk, Małysiak) (PP) – 14:48	1–0
	1–1	21:16 – Levo (Litma, Hakulinen) (PP)
Zabawa (Jobczyk, Małysiak)–27:13	2–1
Kokoszka (Chowaniec) – 29:52	3–1
	3–2	30:27 – Porvari (Leinonen, Suoraniemi)
Jobczyk (Małysiak, Zabawa) – 33:08	4–2
Kokoszka (Dziubiński, Marcinczak) – 34:40	5–2
	5–3	36:57 – Leinonen (Kiimalainen, Porvari)
	5–4	46:05 – Leppänen (Levo, Peltonen)

10 min
Penalties
4 min
25
Shots
49

12 February 1980; 20:40	Japan	0–16 (0–8, 0–5, 0–3)	Soviet Union	Olympic Fieldhouse, Lake Placid

Takeshi Iwamoto
Minoru Misawa
Goalies
Vladislav Tretiak
Vladimir Myshkin
Referee:
(West Germany) Josef Kompalla

0–1	03:42 – Starikov (Petrov, Mikhailov)
0–2	07:55 – Kharlamov (Mikhailov)
0–3	09:47 – A. Golikov (Makarov, Starikov)
0–4	12:19 – Fetisov (Petrov, Kharlamov)
0–5	14:59 – A. Golikov (Makarov)
0–6	17:30 – Balderis (Starikov, Zhluktov)
0–7	19:00 – V. Golikov (Makarov)
0–8	19:27 – V. Golikov (Fetisov, A. Golikov)
0–9	20:06 – Petrov (Kasatonov)
0–10	21:20 – Kasatonov (Mikhailov, Balderis)
0–11	24:20 – Makarov (V. Golikov, Vasiliev)
0–12	26:33 – Mikhailov (Starikov, Kharlamov)
0–13	38:06 – Fetisov (Mikhailov, Kharlamov)
0–14	46:26 – Zhluktov (Balderis, Skvortsov)
0–15	51:21 – Petrov (Pervukhin, Kharlamov)
0–16	54:49 – A. Golikov (Makarov, V. Golikov)

0 min
Penalties
2 min
17
Shots
67

14 February 1980; 16:30	Netherlands	4–17 (1–8, 1–7, 2–2)	Soviet Union	Olympic Arena, Lake Placid

John de Bruyn
Ted Lenssen
Goalies
Vladimir Myshkin
Referee:
(Czechoslovakia) Vladimir Šubrt

	0–1	04:24 – Fetisov (Krutov, Maltsev)
	0–2	04:43 – Krutov (Lebedev, Kasatonov)
	0–3	09:59 – Vasiliev (Lebedev, Starikov) (SH)
	0–4	10:12 – Petrov (Pervukhin) (SH)
	0–5	11:43 – Kharlamov (Mikhailov, Pervukhin) (SH)
Hille (van Wieren, de Heer) – 11:51	1–5
	1–6	14:41 – Lebedev (Maltsev)
	1–7	16:41 – Maltsev (Zhluktov)
	1–8	22:02 - Lebedev (Fetisov, Maltsev)
	1–9	21:14 – Zhluktov (Bilyaletdinov) (PP)
	1–10	22:02 – Lebedev (Zhluktov, Skvortsov)
	1–11	24:32 – A. Golikov (V. Golikov)
	1–12	30:21 – A. Golikov
	1–13	31:07 – Krutov (Maltsev, Pervukhin)
	1–14	36:09 – Krutov (Lebedev, Kasatonov)
de Graauw (Klooster, de Cloe) – 36:49	2–14
	2–15	39:14 – Maltsev (Krutov)
de Cloe – 41:52	3–15
	3–16	47:12 – Makarov (V. Golikov, Starikov)
de Graauw (Klooster) – 56:14	4–16
	4–17	56:12 – Makarov (V. Golikov, A. Golikov)

14 min
Penalties
13 min
26
Shots
49

14 February 1980; 17:00	Poland	1–5 (0–1, 1–2, 0–2)	Canada	Olympic Fieldhouse, Lake Placid

Henryk Wojtynek
Goalies
Paul Pageau
Referee:
(West Germany) Josef Kompalla

	0–1	03:17 – Zupancich (Pirie, D'Alvise)
Jobczyk (Zabawa) – 23:17	1–1
	1–2	30:56 – Watters (G. Anderson, Spring)
	1–3	32:06 – Berry (Maxwell, MacLean)
	1–4	47:42 – Devaney (Hindmarch, Gregg)
	1–5	53:29 – Primeau

0 min
Penalties
0 min
25
Shots
36

14 February 1980; 20:00	Japan	3–6 (0–2, 2–2, 1–2)	Finland	Olympic Arena, Lake Placid

Minoru Misawa
Goalies
Antero Kivelä
Referee:
(Canada) Bernie Haley

	0–1	02:02 – Hakulinen (Peltonen) (PP)
	0–2	05:43–Leinonen (Kiimalainen)
	0–3	22:47 – Leppänen (Hakulinen, Levo)
	0–4	33:36 – Leinonen (Leinonen, Porvari)
S. Misawa (Hori, Hanzawa) – 37:57	1–4
Honma (Hori, S. Misawa) (PP) – 39:59	2–4
	2–5	43:34 – Kiimalainen
Azuma (Matsuda) – 47:38	3–5
	3–6	51:11 – Leppänen (Levo, Peltonen)

6 min
Penalties
8 min
29
Shots
51

16 February 1980; 16:30	Japan	3–3 (3–1, 0–1, 0–1)	Netherlands	Olympic Arena, Lake Placid

Takeshi Iwamoto
Goalies
Ted Lenssen
Referee:
(Czechoslovakia) Vladimir Šubrt

Sakurai – 14:22	1–0
Urabe – 14:41	2–0
Urabe (Honma) – 18:01	3–0
	3–1	18:43 – van Gog (de Graauw)
	3–2	33:39 – Decloe (de Graauw, Peternousek)
	3–3	57:15 – Decloe (de Graauw, van Gog)

6 min
Penalties
8 min
23
Shots
27

16 February 1980; 16:30	Soviet Union	8–1 (5–1, 1–0, 2–0)	Poland	Olympic Fieldhouse, Lake Placid

Vladimir Myshkin
Goalies
Paweł Łukaszka
Henryk Wojtynek
Referee:
(United States) Jim Neagles

Skvortsov (Zhluktov) – 01:53	1–0
Balderis (Zhluktov, Skvortsov) – 10:27	2–0
Balderis (Zhluktov) – 10:36	3–0
Mikhailov (Fetisov, Kharlamov)–13:37	4–0
	4–1	17:15 – Małysiak (Jobczyk) (PP)
Balderis (Pervukhin, Bilyaletdinov)–23:12	5–1
Kharlamov – 25:19	6–1
Bilyaletdinov (Kharlamov) (PP) – 43:41	7–1
Maltsev (Fetisov) – 48:58	8–1

8 min
Penalties
6 min
60
Shots
19

16 February 1980; 20:30	Canada	3–4 (1–2, 0–1, 2–1)	Finland	Olympic Fieldhouse, Lake Placid

Bob Dupuis
Goalies
Jorma Valtonen
Referee:
(Sweden) Ulf Lindgren

	0–1	04:03 – Peltonen (Suoraniemi)
MacLean (Berry, O'Malley) – 14:22	1–1
	1–2	19:51 – Leppänen (Hakulinen, Levo)
	1–3	37:07 – Koskilahti
G. Anderson (Nill, Davidson) – 46:47	2–3
	2–4	56:55 – Suoraniemi (Leppänen) (SH)
Primeau (Hindmarch, Devaney) – 57:09	3–4

16 min
Penalties
10 min
33
Shots
26

18 February 1980; 13:00	Canada	6–0 (2–0, 2–0, 2–0)	Japan	Olympic Arena, Lake Placid

Paul Pageau
Goalies
Minoru Misawa
Referee:
(United States) Jim Neagles

Devaney (Zupancich, D'Alvise) (PP) – 09:36	1–0
Primeau – 14:35	2–0
MacLean (Maxwell) – 23:17	3–0
Davidson – 26:19	4–0
W. Anderson – 41:27	5–0
Hindmarch – 50:22	6–0

14 min
Penalties
22 min
48
Shots
13

18 February 1980; 16:30	Netherlands	5–3 (3–1, 2–1, 0–1)	Poland	Olympic Arena, Lake Placid

Ted Lenssen
Goalies
Henryk Wojtynek
Paweł Łukaszka
Referee:
(West Germany) Josef Kompalla

Klooster (van Gog, Pluymers) – 01:39	1–0
	1–1	05:51 – Janiszewski (Zabawa) (PP)
de Heer (Peternousek, Janssen) (PP) – 08:18	2–1
de Heer (van Wieren, Janssen) – 13:58	3–1
	3–2	21:37 – Jobczyk (Małysiak, Janiszewski)
Klooster (van Gog, de Graauw) – 24:42	4–2
de Heer (van Wieren) – 36:05	5–2
	5–3	47:36 – Kokoszka (Potz)

8 min
Penalties
2 min
26
Shots
30

18 February 1980; 17:00	Finland	2–4 (1–0, 0–1, 1–3)	Soviet Union	Olympic Fieldhouse, Lake Placid

Antero Kivelä
Goalies
Vladislav Tretiak
Referee:
(Canada) Bernie Haley

Porvari (Suoraniemi) – 17:44	1–0
	1–1	36:01 – Fetisov (Makarov, A. Golikov)
Porvari (SH) – 42:38	2–1
	2–2	54:59 – Krutov (Lebedev)
	2–3	56:07 – Maltsev (Krutov, Lebedev)
	2–4	56:18 – Mikhailov (Kasatonov)

14 min
Penalties
8 min
13
Shots
48

20 February 1980; 16:30	Poland	5–1 (3–0, 1–0, 1–1)	Japan	Olympic Arena, Lake Placid

Henryk Wojtynek
Goalies
Takeshi Iwamoto
Referee:
(Sweden) Ulf Lindgren

Zabawa (Małysiak, Janiszewski) – 03:03	1–0
Dziubiński (Kokoszka, Chowaniec) – 04:20	2–0
Małysiak (Jobczyk, Zabawa)–11:37	3–0
Jobczyk (Małysiak, Zabawa) – 26:05	4–0
Pytel (Marcinczak, Ujwary) (PP)–43:57	5–0
	5–1	54:50 – Fujii (Misawa, Hanzawa)

8 min
Penalties
12 min
53
Shots
12

20 February 1980; 17:00	Soviet Union	6–4 (1–1, 1–2, 4–1)	Canada	Olympic Fieldhouse, Lake Placid

Vladislav Tretiak
Goalies
Paul Pageau
Referee:
(United States) Jim Neagles

	0–1	01:35 – Nill (Davidson, G. Anderson)
Balderis (Skvortsov, Zhluktov) – 13:42	1–1
	1–2	20:19 – Gregg
	1–3	22:38–Pirie (Zupancich, D'Alvise)
Kasatonov (Krutov) – 39:47	2–3
Mikhailov (A. Golikov) – 41:53	3–3
A. Golikov (Makarov)–42:05	4–3
	4–4	43:05 – D'Alvise
Mikhailov (Starikov)–48:41	5–4
A. Golikov – 56:51	6–4

6 min
Penalties
12 min
35
Shots
26

20 February 1980; 20:00	Finland	10–3 (2–1, 2–1, 6–1)	Netherlands	Olympic Arena, Lake Placid

Jorma Valtonen
Goalies
Ted Lenssen
John de Bruyn
Referee:
(West Germany) Josef Kompalla

Porvari – 10:41	1–0
	1–1	18:13 – van Wieren (de Heer)
Leppänen (Litma, Eloranta) – 18:28	2–1
	2–2	30:25 – Klooster (de Graauw)
Villa (Koskinen, Saarinen) – 33:07	3–2
Porvari (Leinonen) – 34:12	4–2
Kurri (Litma, Leppänen) (PP2) – 42:35	5–2
Peltonen (Leppänen, Kurri) (PP) – 43:44	6–2
Koskinen (Eloranta) (PP) – 44:34	7–2
Hakulinen (Peltonen, Leppänen) – 46:10	8–2
Kurri (Eloranta, Hakulinen) (PP2) – 48:16	9–2
Haapalainen (Leinonen, Kiimalainen) – 51:03	10–2
	10–3	53:04 – Peternousek (de Heer, van Wieren)

4 min
Penalties
22 min
42
Shots
16

== Consolation round ==
The third-placed teams in each division played each other to determine fifth place.

22 February 1980; 13:30	Czechoslovakia	6–1 (5–0, 0–1, 1–0)	Canada	Olympic Fieldhouse, Lake Placid

Jiří Králík
Goalies
Bob Dupuis
Paul Pageau
Referee:
(Soviet Union) Viktor Dombrovski

Fryčer (Nový, Pouzar) – 01:38	1–0
A. Šťastný – 02:14	2–0
M. Šťastný (Bubla, A. Šťastný) – 07:16	3–0
A. Šťastný (M. Šťastný, P. Šťastný) – 12:47	4–0
M. Šťastný (A. Šťastný, P. Šťastný) – 13:19	5–0
	5–1	28:01 – Devaney (Grant, Hindmarch)
M. Šťastný (P. Šťastný) – 57:18	6–1

8 min
Penalties
6 min
27
Shots
21

== Final round ==
Team	Pld	W	L	D	GF	GA	GD	Pts
United States	3	2	0	1	10	7	+3	5
Soviet Union	3	2	1	0	16	8	+8	4
Sweden	3	0	1	2	7	14	−7	2
Finland	3	0	2	1	7	11	−4	1

Source: HockeyCanada.ca

Head-to-head results carried forward from group games:

- February 12: Sweden 2–2 USA
- February 18: Finland 2–4 USSR

Final round games:

22 February 1980; 17:00	United States	4–3 (2–2, 0–1, 2–0)	Soviet Union	Olympic Fieldhouse, Lake Placid

Jim Craig
Goalies
Vladislav Tretiak
Vladimir Myshkin
Referee:
(Finland) Karl-Gustav Kaisla

	0–1	09:12 – Krutov (Kasatonov)
Schneider (Pavelich) – 14:03	1–1
	1–2	17:34 – Makarov (A. Golikov)
Johnson (Christian, Silk) – 19:59	2–2
	2–3	22:18 – Maltsev (Krutov) (PP)
Johnson (Silk) (PP) – 48:39	3–3
Eruzione (Pavelich, Harrington) – 50:00	4–3

6 min
Penalties
6 min
16
Shots
39

22 February 1980; 20:42	Finland	3–3 (1–0, 1–1, 1–2)	Sweden	Olympic Fieldhouse, Lake Placid

Antero Kivelä
Goalies
Pelle Lindbergh
Referee:
(United States) Jim Neagles

Leinonen (Porvari, Kiimalainen) – 03:00	1–0
Porvari (Eloranta) – 27:06	2–0
	2–1	30:25 – Weinstock
	2–2	45:24 – Jonsson (Åhlberg, Holmgren)
	2–3	46:14 – Waltin (Norberg)
Leinonen (Porvari) – 47:59	3–3

6 min
Penalties
6 min
25
Shots
30

24 February 1980; 11:00	United States	4–2 (0–1, 1–1, 3–0)	Finland	Olympic Fieldhouse, Lake Placid

Jim Craig
Goalies
Jorma Valtonen
Referee:
(Czechoslovakia) Vladimir Šubrt

	0–1	09:20 – Porvari (Leinonen, Litma)
Christoff – 24:39	1–1
	1–2	26:30 – Leinonen (Haapalainen, Kiimalainen) (PP)
Verchota (Christian) – 42:25	2–2
McClanahan (Johnson, Christian) – 46:05	3–2
Johnson (Christoff) (SH) – 56:25	4–2

10 min
Penalties
4 min
29
Shots
23

24 February 1980; 14:30	Sweden	2–9 (0–4, 0–5, 2–0)	Soviet Union	Olympic Fieldhouse, Lake Placid

Pelle Lindbergh
Goalies
Vladimir Myshkin
Referee:
(Canada) Bernie Haley

	0–1	00:36 – Petrov (Kharlamov)
	0–2	05:52 – Makarov (A. Golikov)
	0–3	10:31 – Maltsev (Bilyaletdinov, Pervukhin)
	0–4	17:38 – Mikhailov (Kharlamov, Pervukhin)
	0–5	20:33 – Vasiliev
	0–6	27:18 – Krutov (Pervukhin)
	0–7	28:14 – Skvortsov (Balderis, Pervukhin)
	0–8	34:51 – Zhluktov (Balderis, Skvortsov)
	0–9	35:02 – Fetisov
Åhlberg (Weinstock, Holmgren) – 49:17	1–9
Holmgren (Näslund) – 54:21	2–9

8 min
Penalties
12 min
26
Shots
28

== Statistics ==
=== Average age ===
Team Japan was the oldest team in the tournament, averaging 30 years. Gold medalists Team USA was the youngest team in the tournament, averaging 22 years and 5 months. Silver medalists Team USSR averaged 26 years and 5 months. Tournament average was 25 years and 5 months.

=== Leading scorers ===
Rank	Player	GP	G	A	Pts
1	(Czechoslovakia) Milan Nový	6	7	8	15
2	(Czechoslovakia) Peter Šťastný	6	7	7	14
3	(Czechoslovakia) Jaroslav Pouzar	6	8	5	13
4	(Soviet Union) Aleksandr Golikov	7	7	6	13
5	(Finland) Jukka Porvari	7	7	4	11
6	(Soviet Union) Boris Mikhailov	7	6	5	11
6	(Soviet Union) Vladimir Krutov	7	6	5	11
8	(Czechoslovakia) Marián Šťastný	6	5	6	11
9	(Soviet Union) Sergei Makarov	7	5	6	11
9	(United States) Mark Johnson	7	5	6	11

Hat trick scorers

- Ken Berry (CAN) (vs. Netherlands)
- Jaroslav Pouzar (TCH) (vs. West Germany)
- Milan Nový (TCH) (vs. West Germany)
- Marián Šťastný (TCH) (vs. Canada)
- Peter Šťastný (TCH) (vs. West Germany)
- Jack de Heer (NED) (vs. Poland)
- Doru Tureanu (ROU) (vs. West Germany)
- Helmuts Balderis (URS) (vs. Poland)
- Aleksandr Golikov (URS) (vs. Japan)
- Vladimir Krutov (URS) (vs. Netherlands)
- Yuri Lebedev (URS) (vs. Netherlands)
- Mats Åhlberg (SWE) (vs. Norway)

=== Leading goaltenders ===
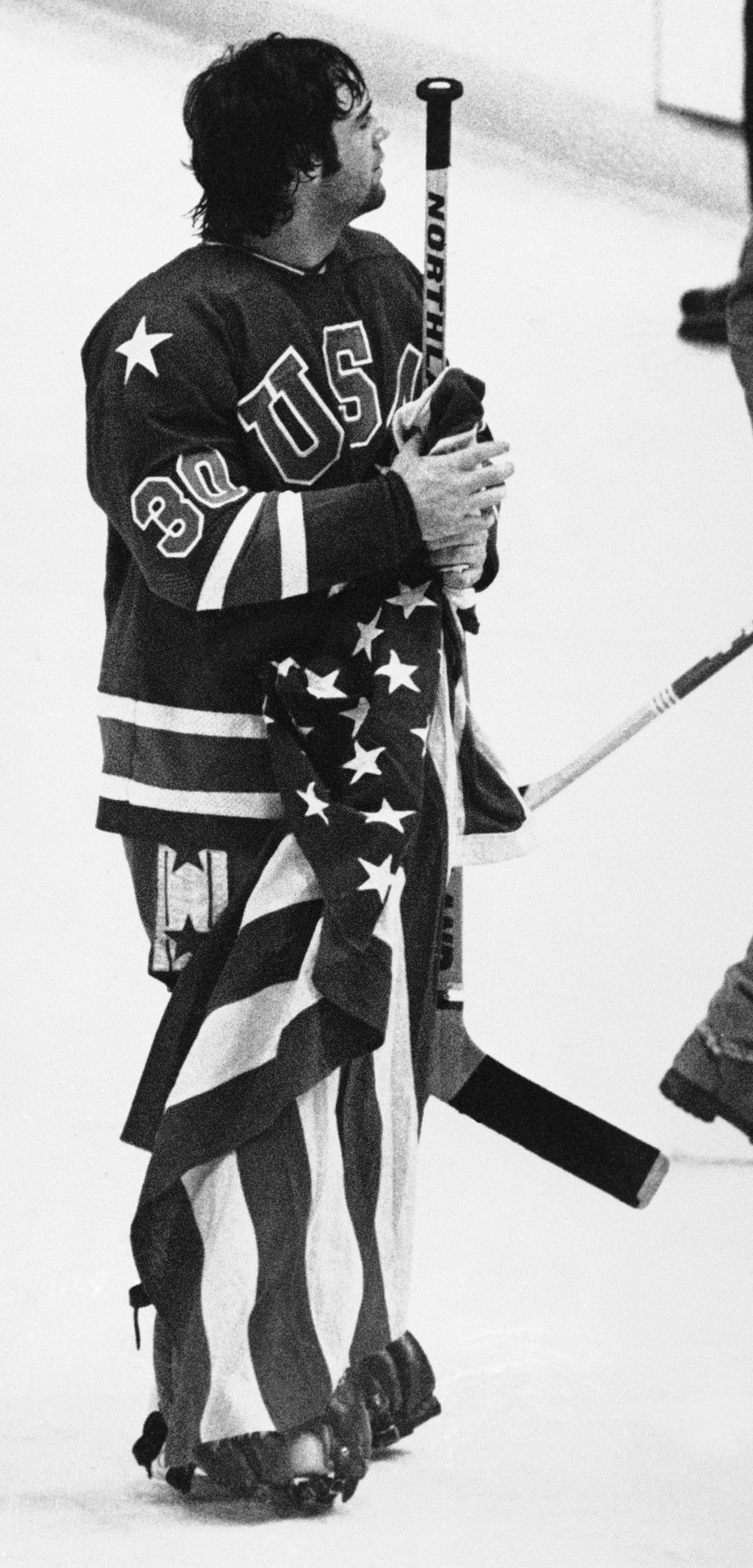
Jim Craig

Goaltenders with 40% or more of their team's total minutes.

Rank	Goaltender	TOI	GA	SV	GAA	SV%
1	Jim Craig (USA)	419:36	15	163	2.14	91.57
2	Antero Kivelä (FIN)	180:00	10	90	3.33	90.00
3	Vladimir Myshkin (URS)	260:00	9	77	2.08	89.53
4	Paul Pageau (CAN)	236:50	11	82	2.79	88.17
5	Pelle Lindbergh (SWE)	300:00	18	124	3.60	87.32

Shutouts

- Paul Pageau (CAN) (vs. Japan)
- Jiří Králík (TCH) (vs. Norway)
- William Löfqvist (SWE) (vs. Romania)
- Vladislav Tretiak (URS) (vs. Japan)

== Final ranking ==
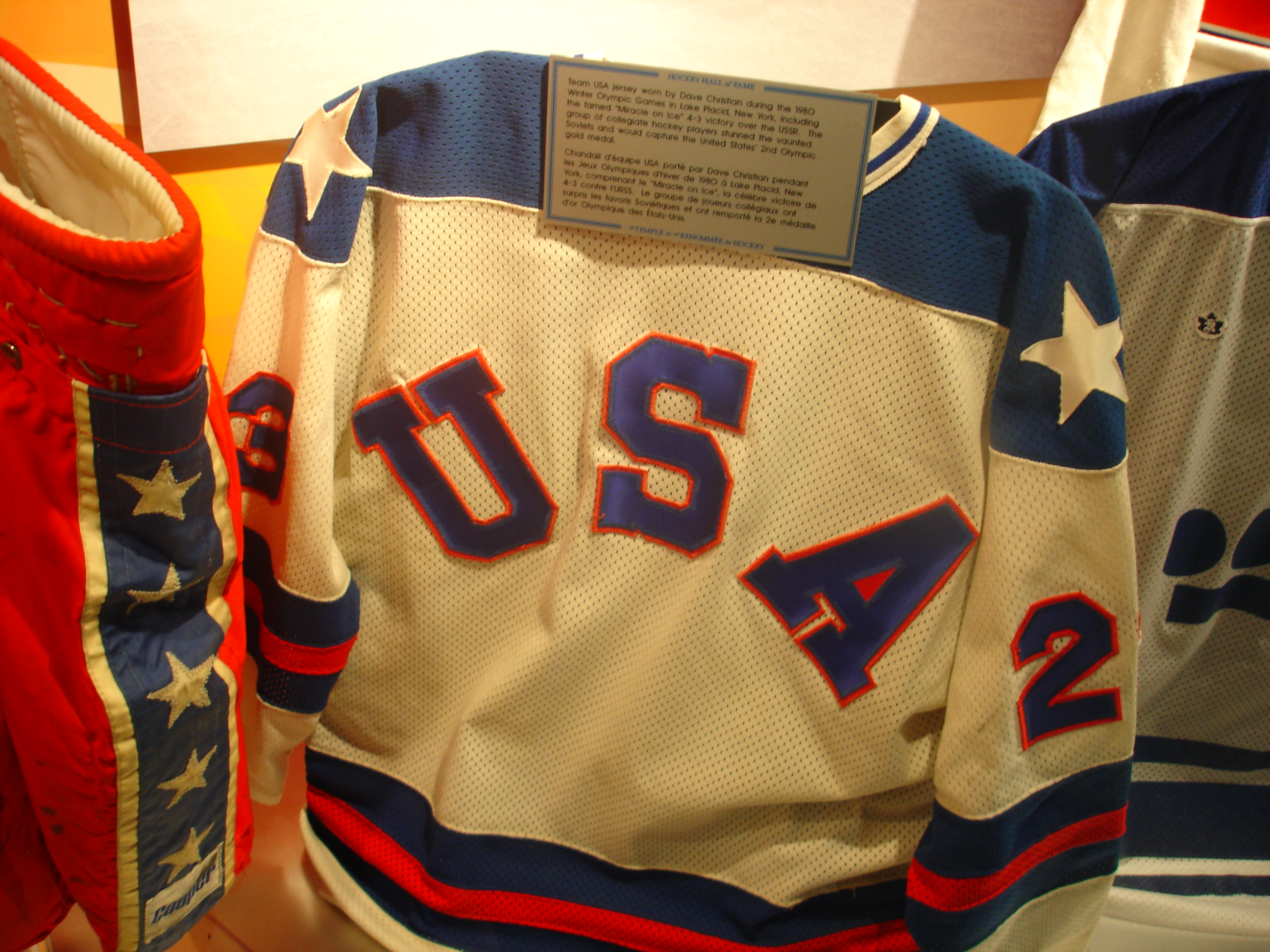
Team USA jersey worn by Dave Christian during the 1980 Winter Olympics

1st place, gold medalist(s)	United States
2nd place, silver medalist(s)	Soviet Union
3rd place, bronze medalist(s)	Sweden
4	Finland
5	Czechoslovakia
6	Canada
7	Poland
8	Romania
9	Netherlands
10	West Germany
11	Norway
12	Japan

1980 Men's Olympic champions

United States
2nd title

These standings are presented as the IIHF has them; however, the IOC maintains that Poland and Romania tied for 7th, the Netherlands and West Germany tied for 9th, and Norway and Japan tied for 11th.
