= Mark Wells =

American ice hockey player (1957–2024)

- Born: September 18, 1957 St. Clair Shores, Michigan, U.S.
- Died: May 14, 2024 (aged 66) Escanaba, Michigan, U.S.
- Height: 5 ft 9 in (175 cm)
- Weight: 175 lb (79 kg; 12 st 7 lb)
- Position: Centre
- Shot: Right
- Played for: Nova Scotia Voyageurs; Flint Generals; New Haven Nighthawks; Fort Wayne Komets; Oklahoma City Stars
- National team: United States
- NHL draft: 176th overall, 1977; Montreal Canadiens
- Playing career: 1980–1982
Medal record
Men's ice hockey
Representing the United States
Olympic Games
Gold medal – first place	1980 Lake Placid	Team

Mark Ronald Wells (September 18, 1957 – May 14, 2024) was an American professional ice hockey forward who was best known for being a member of the 1980 U.S. Olympic hockey team.

== Amateur career ==
Mark Wells graduated from Lake Shore High School in St. Clair Shores, Michigan, in 1975. Wells then attended Bowling Green State University from 1975 to 1979 where he was a star forward with the Falcons in the Central Collegiate Hockey Association. Despite his abilities as a player, Wells did not receive a scholarship offer to play hockey until after his first season with the team.

Following the completion of his college career, Wells, along with Falcons teammate Ken Morrow, was selected to play on the 1980 U.S. Olympic Men's Ice Hockey team that went on to win the gold medal at Lake Placid. Wells played centre on a line with Phil Verchota and Eric Strobel.

Wells was the last players added to the 1980 roster. He suffered from a hairline fracture during a training run, this threatened his chances.

== Professional career ==
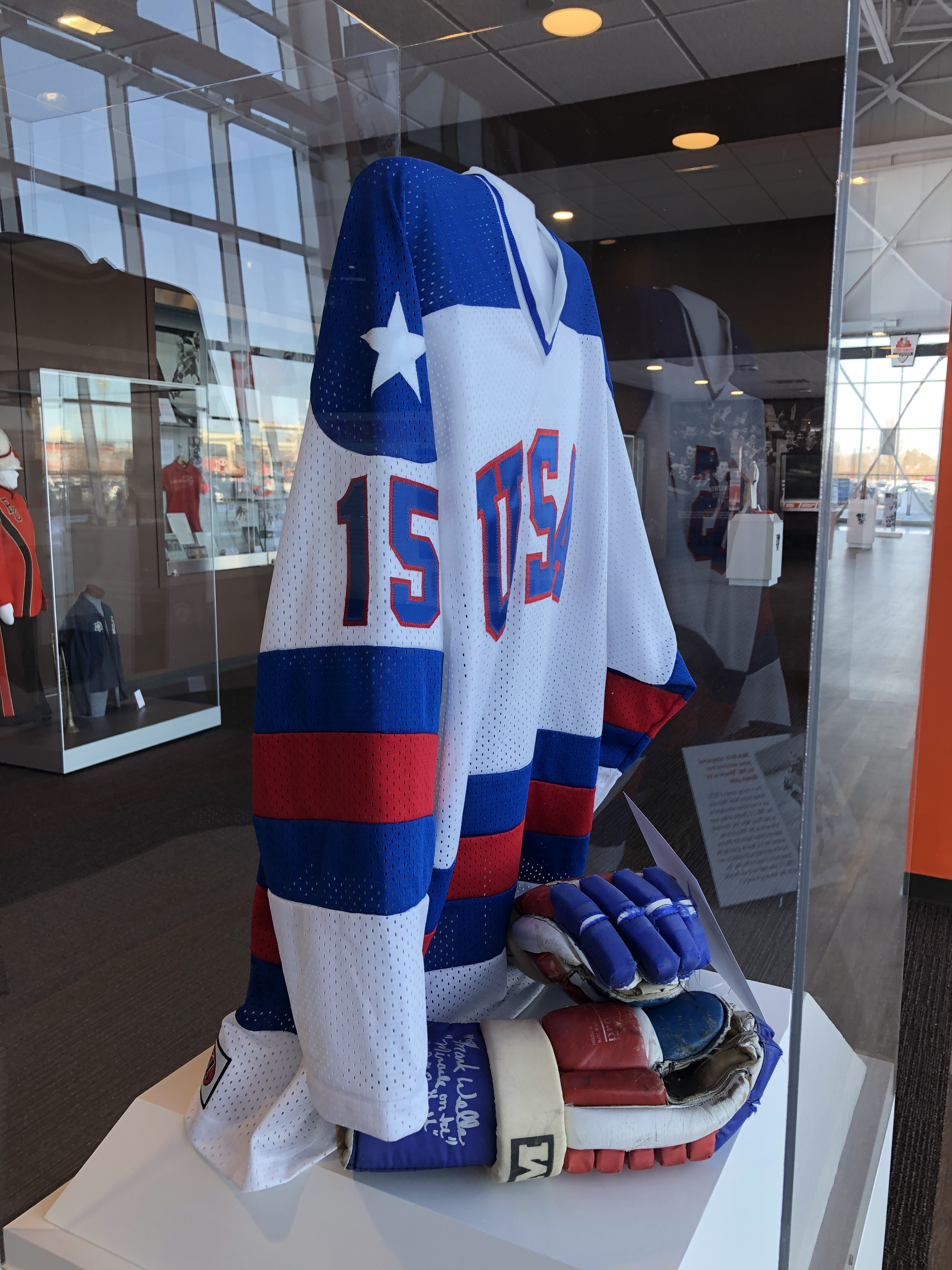
The jersey that Mark Wells wore during the Miracle on Ice

Wells was selected 176th overall in the 1977 NHL entry draft by the Montreal Canadiens. He joined Montreal's top farm team the Nova Scotia Voyageurs after the Olympics but was unable to secure a spot on the Canadiens roster. He was traded to the Detroit Red Wings after the 1980 season, however refused the assignment and was released from his contract.

Wells then signed as a free agent with the New York Rangers but spent the next two seasons shifting around the minor leagues playing for the New Haven Nighthawks, Flint Generals, Fort Wayne Komets, and Oklahoma City Stars. Wells finally retired in 1982 without playing a single game in the NHL.

== Post-playing career ==
Following his retirement from hockey, Wells worked as a restaurant manager in Rochester Hills, Michigan, but sustained a fractured vertebra while unloading crates. Following eleven hours of surgery, Wells was informed by the doctor that he had a rare degenerative spinal disease. The illness, which affects the disks in the spinal column, forced Wells to retire from work and required multiple surgeries, leaving him bed-ridden for extended periods and clinically depressed. Wells did, however, manage to suit up for the reunion game with his 'Miracle on Ice' teammates before the 2002 Winter Olympics in Salt Lake City—against doctor's orders, playing in one shift and recording a shot on goal.

In 2010, financially struggling from medical bills and in need of finances for further surgery, Wells reluctantly sold his gold medal medallion to a private collector for $40,000. The medal was later auctioned off by the buyer for $310,700. Having kept the medal on his nightstand for over twenty years, Wells expressed in a 2010 Daily News article how difficult a decision it had been to sell the medal: "It killed me to sell the medal. Killed me. But my life was crumbling. I was going to lose my home. I needed to sell it to have surgery and to live. I had no choice."

In later years, Wells attended civic events and spoke at several special venues around his hometown and beyond, including the St Clair Shores Lions Club fundraiser, SCS Tree Lighting Ceremony in Dec 2014, and seminar at the Arsenal of Democracy. Additionally, he made appearances at state hockey tournaments and various collectors shows around the country. He resided in the Upper Peninsula of Michigan.

Wells died on May 14, 2024, at the age of 66.

== Awards and achievements ==
Award	Year
All-CCHA First Team	1976–77
All-CCHA First Team	1978–79

- Olympic Gold Medal in Men's Ice Hockey, U.S. Men's Ice Hockey team: 1980
- St. Clair Shores, Michigan, city officials rename the St. Clair Shores Civic Arena's Olympia Room as the Mark Wells Ice Rink: 2014

== In popular culture ==
Wells was featured in a 1981 TV movie about the 1980 U.S. hockey team called Miracle on Ice. Jeff Miller, a retired California State Assemblyman played Wells in the 1981 movie, and Wells himself appeared in archival footage of the gold medal ceremony used in the movie.

In the 2004 Disney film Miracle, he is portrayed by Joe Hemsworth.

== Career statistics ==
=== Regular season and playoffs ===
			Regular season					Playoffs
Season	Team	League	GP	G	A	Pts	PIM	GP	G	A	Pts	PIM
1974–75	Detroit Jr. Red Wings	SOJHL	—	—	—	—	—	—	—	—	—	—
1975–76	Bowling Green Falcons	CCHA	32	17	27	44	10	—	—	—	—	—
1976–77	Bowling Green Falcons	CCHA	39	23	36	59	20	—	—	—	—	—
1977–78	Bowling Green Falcons	CCHA	38	11	34	45	33	—	—	—	—	—
1978–79	Bowling Green Falcons	CCHA	45	26	57	83	30	—	—	—	—	—
1979–80	United States	Intl	22	7	6	13	2	—	—	—	—	—
1979–80	Nova Scotia Voyageurs	AHL	9	1	0	1	0	—	—	—	—	—
1979–80	Flint Generals	IHL	19	9	13	22	19	—	—	—	—	—
1980–81	New Haven Nighthawks	AHL	67	14	29	43	22	—	—	—	—	—
1981–82	Fort Wayne Komets	IHL	19	3	10	13	8	—	—	—	—	—
1981–82	Oklahoma City Stars	CHL	14	1	1	2	6	—	—	—	—	—
1981–82	Flint Generals	IHL	6	0	1	1	6	—	—	—	—	—
AHL totals			76	15	29	44	22	—	—	—	—	—
IHL totals			44	12	24	36	33	—	—	—	—	—

=== International ===
Year	Team	Event	GP	G	A	Pts	PIM
1980	United States	OG	7	2	1	3	0
