= Buzz Schneider =

Croatian-American ice hockey player (born 1954)

- Born: September 14, 1954 (age 72) Grand Rapids, Minnesota, U.S.
- Height: 5 ft 11 in (180 cm)
- Weight: 181 lb (82 kg; 12 st 13 lb)
- Position: Left wing
- Shot: Left
- Played for: AHL; Springfield Indians; WHA; Birmingham Bulls; CHL; Oklahoma City Blazers; SHL; Hampton Gulls; IHL; Milwaukee Admirals; NDA; SC Bern
- National team: United States
- NHL draft: 98th overall, 1974; Pittsburgh Penguins
- WHA draft: 44th overall, 1974; Minnesota Fighting Saints
- Playing career: 1972–1982
Medal record
Men's ice hockey
Representing the United States
Olympic Games
Gold medal – first place	1980 Lake Placid	Team

William Conrad "Buzz" Schneider (born September 14, 1954) is a Croatian-American former ice hockey player best remembered for his role on the US Olympic hockey team that won the gold medal at the 1980 Winter Olympics in Lake Placid. He was also a member of the US Olympic hockey team at the 1976 Winter Olympics.

== College career ==
Schneider is of Croatian ancestry. His nickname "Buzz" comes from his grandmother calling him the Croatian word for "brother" when he was a baby, which sounds like "buzz." He grew up in Babbitt, Minnesota, where he played hockey, baseball and football at Babbitt High School.

After attending the University of Minnesota, where he played on the Golden Gophers under Herb Brooks and won the 1974 NCAA Hockey Championship, Schneider was drafted 98th overall in the 1974 NHL amateur draft by the Pittsburgh Penguins and 73rd overall in the 1974 WHA amateur draft by the Minnesota Fighting Saints.

== International and later career ==
Schneider played for the United States national team from 1974–76 at the 1974, 1975 and 1976 Ice Hockey World Championships, as well as the 1976 Olympic team) before turning professional. He played in a variety of minor leagues before playing four games for the Birmingham Bulls of the World Hockey Association (WHA) during the 1976-77 season. After the end of the WHA season, he returned to play for the US national team at the 1977 World Ice Hockey Championships tournament in Vienna. Schneider returned to the minor leagues in 1977–78. He played two seasons in the International Hockey League (IHL) before getting back to the national team in 1979 to prepare for the 1980 Olympics.

During the 1979–80 season, Schneider played 62 games for the national team scoring 27 goals. During the Miracle on Ice run in the Olympics, he scored five goals and notched three assists in seven games en route to the gold medal. Schneider played on the Olympic team's top-scoring "Iron Rangers" or "Conehead" line with John Harrington and Mark Pavelich.

After the Olympics he played in Bern, Switzerland, until 1983. Schneider returned to the U.S. national hockey team for the 1982 Ice Hockey World Championships tournament in Helsinki.

== Post-playing career ==
After retiring from the game in 1983, Schneider returned to Minneapolis and worked as a sales executive for a semi-trailer company. He quit his job in 2001 to gain a commercial real estate license.

Schneider was inducted into the United States Hockey Hall of Fame in 2003 as a member of the 1980 Olympic team. He has two sons, Billy and Neal. He is now the coordinator of the Turkey men's national ice hockey team.

== In popular culture ==
In the 1981 TV movie Miracle on Ice, Schneider is played by Jonathan Segal.

Buzz's son Billy portrayed him in the 2004 Disney movie Miracle. When director Gavin O'Connor was made aware of the family connection, he stated that he immediately wanted to offer Billy a role in the film.

On the animated TV series American Dad, Buzz is also alluded to as Roger's persona "Chex Lemineux" in the episode "Return of the Bling". This is unconfirmed, but he is one of the only players not referenced in the episode. Roger is also present in place of Buzz in several photos shown in the slide show at the 1980 Olympic team reunion in the episode.

== Career statistics ==
=== Regular season and playoffs ===
			Regular season					Playoffs
Season	Team	League	GP	G	A	Pts	PIM	GP	G	A	Pts	PIM
1971–72	Babbitt J F Kennedy High School	HS-MN
1972–73	University of Minnesota	WCHA	34	7	9	16	26	—	—	—	—	—
1973–74	University of Minnesota	WCHA	40	24	15	39	38	—	—	—	—	—
1974–75	University of Minnesota	WCHA	41	19	17	36	63	—	—	—	—	—
1975–76	United States	Intl	64	39	31	70	88	—	—	—	—	—
1976–77	Springfield Indians	AHL	7	0	0	0	2	—	—	—	—	—
1976–77	Birmingham Bulls	WHA	4	0	0	0	2	—	—	—	—	—
1976–77	Hampton Gulls	SHL	42	14	22	36	38	—	—	—	—	—
1976–77	Oklahoma City Blazers	CHL	1	0	0	0	0	—	—	—	—	—
1977–78	Milwaukee Admirals	IHL	56	16	13	29	29	5	1	1	2	2
1978–79	Milwaukee Admirals	IHL	67	12	23	35	80	2	0	1	1	4
1979–80	United States	Intl	52	22	12	34	44	—	—	—	—	—
1980–81	SC Bern	NDA	—	—	—	—	—	—	—	—	—	—
1981–82	SC Bern	NDA	—	—	—	—	—	—	—	—	—	—
IHL totals			123	28	36	64	109	7	1	2	3	6
WHA totals			4	0	0	0	2	—	—	—	—	—

=== International ===
Year	Team	Event	GP	G	A	Pts	PIM
1975	United States	WC	10	8	0	8	10
1976	United States	OG	6	3	2	5	6
1976	United States	WC	10	2	1	3	6
1977	United States	WC	10	1	1	2	2
1980	United States	OG	7	5	3	8	4
1982	United States	WC	7	1	1	2	2
Senior totals			50	20	8	28	30
