= Rob McClanahan =

American ice hockey player (born 1958)

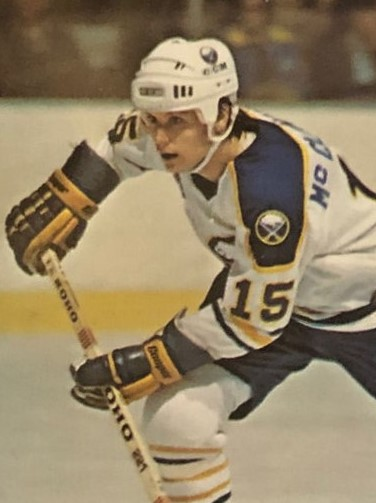
- McClanahan as a member of the Buffalo Sabres
- Born: January 9, 1958 (age 68) Saint Paul, Minnesota, U.S.
- Height: 5 ft 10 in (178 cm)
- Weight: 180 lb (82 kg; 12 st 12 lb)
- Position: Left wing
- Shot: Left
- Played for: Buffalo Sabres; Hartford Whalers; New York Rangers
- National team: United States
- NHL draft: 49th overall, 1978; Buffalo Sabres
- Playing career: 1979–1984
Medal record
Men's ice hockey
Representing the United States
Olympic Games
Gold medal – first place	1980 Lake Placid	Team competition

Robert Bruce McClanahan (born January 9, 1958) is an American former professional ice hockey player who played 224 games in the National Hockey League (NHL) for the Buffalo Sabres, Hartford Whalers and New York Rangers between 1980 and 1983. McClanahan was a member of the U.S. men's Olympic hockey team that beat the Soviet Union en route to a gold medal at Lake Placid in 1980.

== Amateur and international career ==
McClanahan attended Mounds View High School and went on to play three seasons for the University of Minnesota, winning the 1979 NCAA national championship. After representing the US at the 1979 World Championship tournament in Moscow, McClanahan joined the US Olympic team on a full-time basis and scored 34 goals in 63 exhibition games. The culmination of McClanahan's amateur career came at the 1980 Olympics in Lake Placid, New York, when he scored five goals in seven games while helping his country win the gold medal. He scored the winning goal in the gold medal game against Finland (which the U.S. came back to win 4–2) two days after the historic American victory over the Soviets.

During the opening game of the Olympic tournament against Sweden, McClanahan sustained a bruise on the upper thigh, which left the US team's roster short a second player, as teammate Jack O'Callahan had been injured during the exhibition game against the Soviet Union only three days prior to the Olympics. A now famous argument between McClanahan and Team USA's coach Herb Brooks during the intermission helped motivate McClanahan to return to the game and play through his injury, inspiring his team to a come-from-behind draw against Sweden that proved vital to achieving gold medal success later in the tournament.

== Professional career ==
McClanahan was selected forty-ninth overall in the 1978 NHL entry draft by the Buffalo Sabres but did not begin playing with the Sabres until 1980, shortly after the Olympics. His NHL career was comparatively short-lived as he was mostly used as a role player. He bounced between the NHL and the American Hockey League and played part of the 1983/1984 season in the Central Hockey League with the Tulsa Oilers before finishing his NHL career under his old Olympic coach Herb Brooks with the New York Rangers in 1984 (he also represented the Hartford Whalers in 1981–82). During his professional career, McClanahan also was a member of Team USA at the 1981 Canada Cup.

== Post-playing career ==
McClanahan became a financial broker after retirement, beginning his career with Morgan Stanley in 1985, then working for Bear Stearns and Piper Jaffray, where he was managing director. He joined the Minneapolis office of ThinkEquity Partners in March 2002 as Principal and became the company's Head of Trading.

He also was featured in American Dad! season 6 episode Return of the Bling.

McClanahan is currently the head coach of The Blake School boys varsity hockey team.

== In popular culture ==
McClanahan was played by Nathan West in the 2004 Disney movie Miracle, which told the story of the 1980 U.S. Olympic gold medal win. West had been a goalie for the junior hockey team the Detroit Whalers in the Ontario Hockey League and has a tattoo of the National Hockey League logo on his arm.

In a 1981 TV movie about the same subject called Miracle on Ice, McClanahan is portrayed by Ken Stovitz.

== Career statistics ==
=== Regular season and playoffs ===
			Regular season					Playoffs
Season	Team	League	GP	G	A	Pts	PIM	GP	G	A	Pts	PIM
1975–76	Mounds View High School	HS-MN	—	—	—	—	—	—	—	—	—	—
1976–77	University of Minnesota	WCHA	40	11	6	17	24	—	—	—	—	—
1977–78	University of Minnesota	WCHA	38	17	25	42	10	—	—	—	—	—
1978–79	University of Minnesota	WCHA	43	17	32	49	34	—	—	—	—	—
1979–80	United States	Intl	63	34	36	70	38	—	—	—	—	—
1979–80	Buffalo Sabres	NHL	13	2	5	7	0	10	0	1	1	4
1980–81	Buffalo Sabres	NHL	53	3	12	15	38	5	0	1	1	13
1980–81	Rochester Americans	AHL	18	9	13	22	10	—	—	—	—	—
1981–82	Hartford Whalers	NHL	17	0	3	3	11	—	—	—	—	—
1981–82	Binghamton Whalers	AHL	27	11	18	29	21	—	—	—	—	—
1981–82	New York Rangers	NHL	22	5	9	14	10	10	2	5	7	2
1981–82	Springfield Indians	AHL	4	5	9	0	—	—	—	—	—
1982–83	New York Rangers	NHL	78	22	26	48	46	9	2	5	7	12
1983–84	Tulsa Oilers	CHL	10	4	10	14	10	—	—	—	—	—
NHL totals			224	38	63	101	126	34	4	12	16	31

=== International ===
Year	Team	Event	GP	G	A	Pts	PIM
1979	United States	WC	8	1	3	4	6
1980	United States	OLY	7	5	3	8	2
1981	United States	CC	6	0	0	0	2
Senior totals			21	6	6	12	10
