= Bob Hindmarch =

Canadian educator and ice hockey coach (1930–2021)

- Born: May 27, 1930; Nanaimo, British Columbia, Canada
- Died: February 20, 2021 (aged 90)
- Education: BSc, MSc, PhD
- Alma mater: University of British Columbia, University of Oregon
- Occupation(s): Professor and director of physical education
- Years active: 1961–1992
- Known for: UBC Thunderbirds hockey and the Canada men's national ice hockey team
- Children: 2, including Dave Hindmarch
- Awards: Order of Canada, Order of British Columbia, Canadian Olympic Hall of Fame, BC Sports Hall of Fame

Robert George Hindmarch CM OBC (May 27, 1930 – February 20, 2021) was a Canadian educator, sports administrator and ice hockey coach. He was a multi-sport athlete at the University of British Columbia (UBC) as a student, and returned as a professor and its director of physical education. He and Father David Bauer established a permanent Canada men's national ice hockey team based at UBC in preparation for ice hockey at the 1964 Winter Olympics. Hindmarch later coached the UBC Thunderbirds men's ice hockey team for 214 wins in 12 seasons; they became one of the first Western Bloc sports teams to play a tour of games in China. He developed additional international sporting relationships for the Thunderbirds in South Korea and Japan, and served as vice-president of the Canadian Olympic Association for 16 years. Hindmarch was made a member of the Order of Canada and the Order of British Columbia; and is inducted into the Canadian Olympic Hall of Fame and the BC Sports Hall of Fame.

== Early life and education ==
Robert George Hindmarch was born on May 27, 1930, in Nanaimo, the son of a coal miner. (Note: For the full name, see his obituary, or the Order of BC. For the birth date, see his obituary. For the birth location and father, see BC Sports Hall of Fame.) Hindmarch participated in numerous sports as a youth including baseball, hockey, lacrosse, soccer, swimming and track and field.

Hindmarch began studying at the University of British Columbia (UBC) in 1948. He played on several teams for the UBC Thunderbirds; which included two years of baseball, two years of basketball team and three years of UBC Thunderbirds football. He received the Dr. Gordon Burke Award in 1952, for leadership and skills on the football team. During his senior season in 1953, he was co-captain of both the football and baseball teams. He was awarded the Bobby Gaul Memorial Trophy as the university's graduating male athlete-of-the-year in 1953. He graduated from UBC with a Bachelor of Science degree in physical education. He coached football at the Duke of Connaught High School in New Westminster during 1954, then was an assistant coach to Frank Gnup on the UBC Thunderbirds football team in 1955.

Hindmarch completed a Master of Science degree in 1959 and a Doctor of Philosophy degree in education in 1962, both from the University of Oregon. His doctoral thesis was Significance of physique, maturational, body size, strength, motor ability and reaction time characteristics of eight year old boys.

== UBC professional career ==
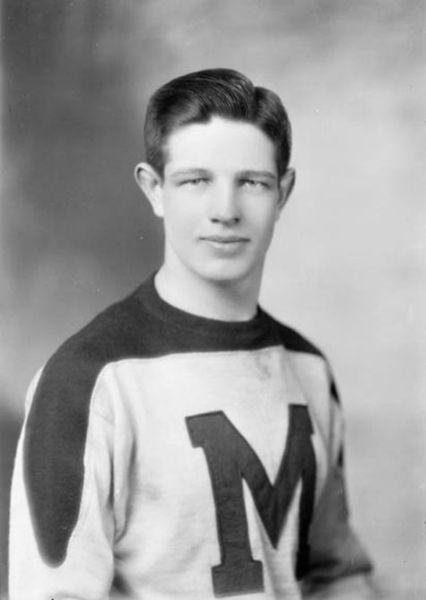
David Bauer

Hindmarch became as assistant professor of physical education at UBC in 1961, then became a full-time professor in 1974. He supported Father David Bauer when he established a permanent Canada men's national ice hockey team based at the Point Grey Campus of UBC. Hindmarch served as general manager and assistant coach of the team which placed fourth in ice hockey at the 1964 Winter Olympics. He managed the team's finances, and made the academic transfer arrangements for players to attend UBC. The team initially struggled for funding and he occasionally donated money from his own pocket to feed the starving student athletes.

Hindmarch began coaching the UBC Thunderbirds men's ice hockey team during the 1964–65 season, and led the team to the 1971 Western Canadian Intercollegiate Athletic Association championship. He accumulated a winning record in 11 of 12 seasons, and set UBC record with 214 wins by a coach in ice hockey. In December 1973, they became one of the first Western Bloc sports teams to tour China, and played a series of games focused on friendship and sharing hockey skills with local players. The trip was supported by the Government of Canada as part of a desire to normalize relations with China, and was not well-publicized at the time. Hindmarch and the Thunderbirds conducted practices attended by the Chinese, and won all seven games played by a combined score of 56 to 5.

Hindmarch continued to develop international relationships for the Thunderbirds during his tenure. He arranged a tour of Japan for the women's hockey team in 1982, began an exchange program for the men's volleyball team with Sungkyunkwan University in South Korea in 1985, and invited Soviet Union national ice hockey team coach Anatoly Tarasov as a guest speaker at UBC in 1987. Hindmarch also worked with Shoichi Tomita, executive director of the Japan Ice Hockey Federation, to establish exchanges between UBC and Japan that advanced the philosophy of physical and psychological education in ice hockey.

Hindmarch served as the UBC athletic director from 1980 to 1992, assisted in coaching the UBC basketball and baseball teams, and oversaw all Thunderbird teams and campus intramural programs. During his tenure as athletic director, many national championships were won by the men's football, men's soccer, women's field hockey and women's swimming teams; and UBC was ranked first in Canada for intercollegiate sports success by Maclean's in 1991. He also sought to build a lasting relationship between UBC and its athletic alumni, and helped to establish the UBC Sports Hall of Fame in 1993.

After leaving the department full time, Hindmarch returned to visit with the school's sports coaches. UBC Basketball coach Kevin Hanson described Hindmarch by saying, "He was one of those special people who would make you feel good about what you were doing".

== Other sporting interests ==
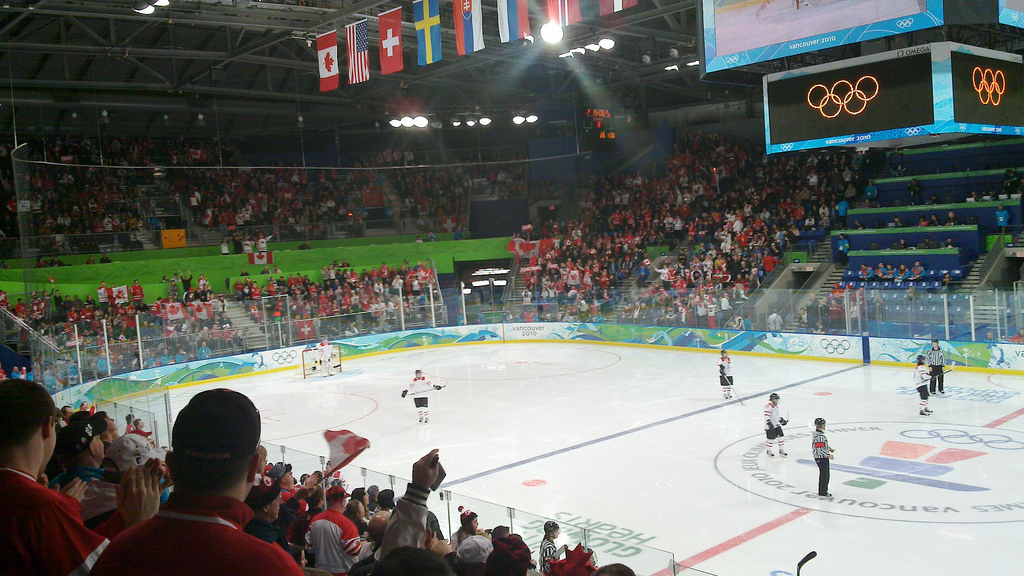
Thunderbird Sports Centre during ice hockey at the 2010 Winter Olympics

Hindmarch served as a director of the Canadian Amateur Hockey Association and helped make hockey helmets mandatory for minor ice hockey players. He served as vice-president of the Canadian Olympic Association for 16 years, and was head of mission for the Canadian delegation to the 1984 Winter Olympics. He served as vice-president of Vancouver's bid to host the 1976 Winter Olympics, sat on the Calgary bid committee for the 1988 Winter Olympics, and was an ambassador for Vancouver's 2010 Winter Olympics bid committee.

Hindmarch was an advisor to Rick Hansen in planning the Man in Motion Tour in 1985, and served as chairman of the Expo 86 sports committee. Hindmarch also served as president of the British Columbia Sports Federation, as a trustee for the British Columbia Sports Hall of Fame, and was involved with the expansion bid for the Vancouver Grizzlies to join the National Basketball Association in 1995.

== Personal life ==
Hindmarch was married to Jean Hindmarch for 65 years until her death, and was the father of hockey players Dave Hindmarch and Bruce Hindmarch. His son Dave represented Canada in ice hockey at the 1980 Winter Olympics and played in the National Hockey League for the Calgary Flames. Hindmarch died at age 90 on February 20, 2021.

== Honours and awards ==
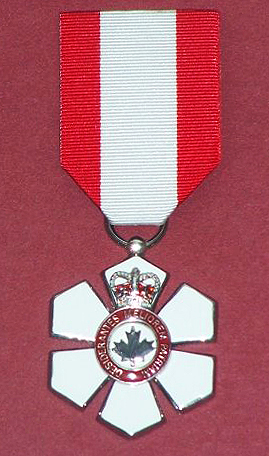
Medal of the Order of Canada

Hindmarch received the Gordon Juckes Award from the CAHA in 1983, for contributions to the development of amateur hockey in Canada. He was inducted into the inaugural class of the UBC Sports Hall of Fame in 1993, and was made the namesake of a scholarship for student athlete leadership at UBC.

Hindmarch was inducted into the builder category of the BC Sports Hall of Fame in 2006. He was given honorary lifetime membership in the Canadian Olympic Association and inducted into the Canadian Olympic Hall of Fame in 2009. Hindmarch was named to the Order of British Columbia in 2010. He was inducted into the builder category of the BC Hockey Hall of Fame in 2012.

Hindmarch was inducted into the Canada West Hall of Fame as an ice hockey coach in 2019. He was named a Member of the Order of Canada in 2019, "for his contributions to sports as an athlete, coach and educator in his province and beyond". After being awarded the Order of Canada, Hindmarch met with UBC alumni and wanted them to wear their school sweaters. Kevin Hanson felt that Hindmarch "was more concerned about people representing UBC that night and the traditions then anything else", and that "he want[ed] us to make sure that we feel like we're a part of it".

== Bibliography ==
- Oliver, Greg (2017). Father Bauer and the Great Experiment: The Genesis of Canadian Olympic Hockey. Toronto, Ontario: ECW Press. ISBN 978-1-77041-249-1. OCLC 954430059.
