= Pageau =

Pageau is a French-Canadian surname. People with the surname include:

- Jean-Gabriel Pageau (born 1992), Canadian ice hockey player
- Paul Pageau (born 1959), Canadian retired ice hockey player
- Jean Pageau, singer of Canadian rock band Mystery
- Gisèle Pageau, mayor of French River, Ontario
