= Miracle on Ice (1981 film) =

- VHS box cover art
- Written by: Lionel Chetwynd
- Directed by: Steven Hilliard Stern
- Starring: Karl Malden; Andrew Stevens; Steve Guttenberg
- Music by: Fred Karlin
- Country of origin: United States
- Original language: English

Production
- Producers: David Garcia; Robert Greenwald; Jim Hay; Frank von Zerneck
- Cinematography: Howard Schwartz
- Editors: Kurt Hirschler; Richard Patterson
- Running time: 132 minutes
- Production companies: Filmways Television; Moonlight Productions

Original release
- Network: ABC
- Release: March 1, 1981

Miracle on Ice is a 1981 American sports docudrama about the United States men's national ice hockey team, led by head coach Herb Brooks (played by Karl Malden), that won the gold medal in the 1980 Winter Olympics. The young United States team's victory over the heavily favored seasoned Soviet team in the medal round was dubbed the "Miracle on Ice". The film premiered on March 1, 1981, as an installment of The ABC Sunday Night Movie.

== Plot ==
Hard-driving, no-nonsense coach Herb Brooks puts 68 of the best college hockey players through a series grueling workouts at Colorado Springs in the summer of 1979. Brooks needs to trim the list down to 20 before they can represent the United States at the 1980 Winter Olympics in Lake Placid, New York. Along the way, Brooks and his assistant coach Craig Patrick must deal with the players' agents and lawyers, who are only interested in the professional hockey contracts that await their clients. Among those clients is goaltender Jim Craig, who wants to pursue a pro career and worries that by joining the Olympics instead, he is placing his family in deeper financial straits. Brooks understands the players' financial difficulties and tries to find a corporate sponsor to cover the team's finances.

After the team list is finally posted, the team plays some exhibition games in Europe, where they post a respectable record (winning eight and only losing two games). But just as they are feeling great about their performance, they play the Minnesota North Stars and realize that their skills could still use improvement; furthermore, they recognize that beating the powerful Soviet Union team, who won the gold medal at the past four Olympic Games and features veteran professionals, will be a tremendous challenge. For their last exhibition game before the Olympics, they play against the Soviet Union at Madison Square Garden. Brooks realizes that this particular game will prove whether his team is ready to compete for the gold medal. The Soviets annihilate them by the score of 10–3, but newly installed captain Mike Eruzione refuses to let the team's spirit slide. In their opening game against the favored Swedish team, the United States is down two goals to one with less than a minute remaining in the game. Brooks pulls his goalie and the U.S. ties the game.

The next two games against Czechoslovakia and Norway both end with the U.S. victorious. The possibility of them making a run for a medal is now especially raised after they beat West Germany prior to their showdown with the Soviets. At the end of the first period in the medal round game between the U.S. and the Soviets, the score is tied. At the end of the second period, the U.S. trails by one goal. In the last few minutes of the game, the Soviet Union stages one last attack, but the U.S. is ultimately victorious. As the crowd at Olympic Center Ice Rink bursts into hysteria, Herb Brooks retreats to the locker room for some solitude, knowing they face Finland for the gold medal. Ultimately though, the United States do defeat Finland for the gold medal and Mike Eruzione urges his team to join him on the platform during the playing of the national anthem.

The film concludes with actual footage of the U.S. hockey team members receiving their medals, along with descriptions narrated by ABC Sports broadcaster Al Michaels of their accomplishments after the 1980 Olympics.

== Cast ==
Character	Actor
Herb Brooks	Karl Malden
Jim Craig	Steve Guttenberg
Ken Morrow	Scott Feraco
Mark Johnson	Michael Cummings
Mike Eruzione	Andrew Stevens
Dave Silk	Richard Dano
Bill Baker	David Wallace
Dave Christian	Thomas F. Duffy
Steve Christoff	Rick Rockwell
John Harrington	Bill Schreiner
Rob McClanahan	Ken Stovitz
Jack O'Callahan	Peter Horton
Mark Pavelich	Jack Blessing
Buzz Schneider	Jonathan Sagal
Les Auge	Jerry Houser
Craig Patrick	Robert Pierce
Patti Brooks	Jessica Walter
Donald Craig	Eugene Roche
Ralph Cox	Brian Mozur
Mark Wells	Jeff Miller
Steve Bond	Reporter #2

Mike Ramsey, Neal Broten, Steve Janaszak, Eric Strobel, Bob Suter, and Phil Verchota were not featured in the film except in archival footage of the gold medal ceremony.

== Production ==
Miracle on Ice was directed by Steven Hilliard Stern and written by Lionel Chetwynd. It incorporates actual game footage and ABC broadcasters Al Michaels and Ken Dryden's original commentary from the 1980 Winter Games.

Stern closely watched videotapes of the Lake Placid games before setting up his scenes at the Los Angeles Sports Arena. These staged shots generally involved close-ups of the actors. The original ABC Sports footage showed the games in long or medium shots. The new material, also videotaped, was then carefully edited into the factual footage, and the result was transferred to film. This process was done in order to maintain the same picture quality throughout and not produce the 'checkerboard effect' according to co-producer Frank von Zerneck. A good number of extras were used for the hockey action scenes that were shot. The Los Angeles production utilized members of the Pacific Southwest Hockey League's Los Angeles Bruins.

Mike Eruzione was a technical consultant on the film saying "we all know the movie will never be able to equal what happened." Eruzione however, wasn't involved with the latter Miracle film at all. According to Eruzione: "I did not want to be involved in the movie. I felt if I was involved then my role would be different, and the guys on the team would have went [sic], he didn’t do this, he didn’t say that. Oh, no, you were an advisor; no wonder why you did this. I stayed away from the movie. I think they interviewed a bunch of us and asked us questions, but we had no input into the movie."

Karl Malden told Sports Illustrated in December 1980 that he had never actually met Herb Brooks in preparation for his portrayal of him, but he studied him on videotape, especially his eyes. Malden said of Brooks "I'd hate to meet him in a dark alley. I think he's a little on the neurotic side. Maybe more than a little. Any moment you think he's going to jump out of his skin."

Malden also remarked with disapproval that Brooks could've ventured an occasional smile during one of the less intense games. Malden also wondered how, after working hard over the course of seven months that Brooks could have simply walked away after his team clinched the improbable victory against the Soviet team.

== Reception ==
Bob Grimm of Tucson Weekly said that Miracle on Ice falls short of being even a good sports movie, stating it made too many errors on and off the ice, failing to capture the essence of the sport it's studying, and reducing most of the men and women involved in the historical drama to caricature.

Outside of archive footage, defenseman Mike Ramsey wasn't depicted in Miracle on Ice. In the February 21, 1998 edition of The Buffalo News, Ramsey said "I also got paid for having my name in the TV movie that ABC did. It was about five years before I sat down and actually watched the movie. I sat back and said 'Uh, oh' when it was over because it wasn't too good. Some time after that, we (the Sabres) came into some city on a road trip at 2 a.m., and it was on TV. I think everyone on the team watched it, because the next morning everyone was busting my chops."

Patti Brooks, who is depicted in Miracle on Ice by Jessica Walter said in 2009 “I don’t know that I ever watched the whole movie.” In regards to Karl Malden's portrayal of her husband, she said “I remember Herbie would not watch it. People used to tease him about Karl Malden playing him. Would you? That would be like Ma Kettle playing me. But you always think that you’re sharper than others think you are. But to be honest, I don’t know why they chose him. I don’t think (Malden) ever went on the ice in his movie; he was too old.” Patti Brooks' brother, Terry Lane added "It was so bad", and was unable to fathom how Karl Malden, at age 69, could be cast in the role of the handsome Herb Brooks, who was 42 when the actual "Miracle on Ice" took place. Herb Brooks himself stated that his wife would've preferred Robert Redford to have played him.

Meanwhile, Mike Eruzione claimed to the Star Tribune that Brooks wanted Paul Newman to play him.

Miracle director Gavin O'Connor said that he remembers calling Herb Brooks to tell him that Karl Malden had been cast to play him and hearing a second or two of silence on the line before he replied, in a tone dripping with acid, ‘Isn’t he a bit old?’ On the other hand, Tom Jones of the Tampa Bay Times said that while the movie was a bit hokey and included some strange choices (such as Steve Guttenberg as goalie Jim Craig), Karl Malden pulled off a credible performance as the grumpy Herb Brooks.

John J. O'Connor of the New York Times said "Miracle on Ice is a fine example of the inspirational sports film. Nothing is said of the many career disappointments suffered by the players since the Olympics, but this film is meant to recapture an extraordinary moment, which it does." O'Connor did however also say that Miracle on Ice was sprinkled liberally with silly bits of business and ludicrous efforts to inject some romance into the scenario. For instance, every so often, a beautiful woman would suggestively approach one of the players, only to disappear quickly as, under Herb Brooks' orders. O'Connor added that outside of Mike Eruzione and Jim Craig, the rest of the team is just a collection of faces passing quickly before the cameras, identified only by the names on the backs of their uniforms. Meanwhile, O'Connor argued that other characters such as Patti Brooks as the loyally supportive and enthusiastic wife and Jim Craig's father, Donald (a devoted fan carrying a religious medal for good luck), are little more than plot conveniences.

33 years later, Victor Mather of the New York Times said that while Miracle on Ice was "Much less inspired than its successor (2004's Miracle), it still delivers a chill or two at its climax."

Entertainment Weekly gave Miracle on Ice a B-, saying "Watching Andrew Stevens and Steve Guttenberg trying to make like hockey players is itself faintly chilling. But the on-ice action is the real thing, and the thrills have not diminished a bit."

== Historical inaccuracies ==
Prior to the start of the film, Al Michaels reads a disclaimer stating that for dramatic purposes, composite characters and time compression was used in some instances. With that being said, Andrew Stevens, who portrayed Mike Eruzione, did so shooting with his right hand even though Eruzione actually shot with his left hand. Eruzione himself also claimed that Donna (Lucinda Dooling), his girlfriend depicted in the film is fictional. Therefore, the two scenes involving her character (where she's on a picnic with Eruzione in the Public Garden in Boston early on in the film, and when she must leave him and return home right before the climax) never happened in real life.

In the U.S. team's locker room prior to the medal round game against the Soviets, Herb Brooks says to his team "Whatever it costs us personally to get here, it was worth it. Don't blow it. You'll take it to your grave!" While the real Brooks did roughly say to his team "You'll take it to your grave!", it was actually during the second intermission of gold medal game against Finland, when the U.S. was down 2–1.

== Soundtrack ==
- "Homeward Bound" (Simon & Garfunkel song) - This is featured during musical interlude on a bus trip throughout Europe with one of the players singing with a guitar. In September 1979, before the Olympics, the American team started exhibition play for a total of 61 games in five months against teams from Europe and the United States.

== Home media ==
TryLon Video released Miracle on Ice on VHS in the U.S. in 1989. It was also released on VHS and Betamax in the UK and Europe by Video Form, and on LaserDisc in Japan. To date, the film remains unreleased on DVD, Blu-ray, or streaming most likely due to the popularity of the 2004 remake Miracle.

== See also ==
- List of films about ice hockey
- List of sports films
- Miracle (2004 film)
