= Sigmund Suttner =

German ice hockey player

Personal information
- Nationality: German
- Born: 7 February 1953 (age 73) Bad Tölz, West Germany

Sport
- Sport: Ice hockey

Sigmund Suttner (born 7 February 1953) is a German ice hockey goaltender. He competed in the men's tournament at the 1980 Winter Olympics.
