= Dave Hindmarch =

Canadian ice hockey player (born 1958)

- Born: October 15, 1958 (age 67) Vancouver, British Columbia, Canada
- Height: 5 ft 11 in (180 cm)
- Weight: 182 lb (83 kg; 13 st 0 lb)
- Position: Right wing
- Shot: Right
- Played for: Calgary Flames
- National team: Canada
- NHL draft: 114th overall, 1978; Atlanta Flames
- Playing career: 1979–1984

David Hindmarch (born October 15, 1958) is a Canadian former ice hockey player. He played 99 games in the National Hockey League with the Calgary Flames from 1981 to 1983. Internationally Hindmarch played for the Canadian national team at the 1980 Winter Olympics.

== Biography ==
Hindmarch was the son of Bob Hindmarch, a University of British Columbia (UBC) Thunderbirds multi-sport athlete and later professor and athletic director at UBC. He played with the University of Alberta Golden Bears hockey team from 1976–77 to 1978–79. The Golden Bears won the national CIAU University Cup championship in 1978 and 1979, with Hindmarch winning the Major W.J. "Danny" McLeod Award in 1979, as Most Valuable Player of the national championship tournament.

Hindmarch played for the Canadian national team at the 1980 Winter Olympics held in Lake Placid, where he scored three goals and four assists in six games.

During his NHL career Hindmarch played games for the Flames and scored 21 goals and 17 assists. He scored his first NHL goal in his first game. A persistent ankle injury led him to retire.

== Career statistics ==
=== Regular season and playoffs ===
| | | | Regular season | | | | | Playoffs |
| Season | Team | League | GP | G | A | Pts | PIM | GP | G | A | Pts | PIM |
|---|---|---|---|---|---|---|---|---|---|---|---|---|
| 1976–77 | University of Alberta | CIAU | 30 | 16 | 19 | 35 | 8 | — | — | — | — | — |
| 1977–78 | University of Alberta | CIAU | 25 | 11 | 18 | 29 | 13 | — | — | — | — | — |
| 1978–79 | University of Alberta | CIAU | 41 | 33 | 29 | 62 | 40 | — | — | — | — | — |
| 1979–80 | Canadian National Team | Intl | 44 | 12 | 11 | 23 | 30 | — | — | — | — | — |
| 1980–81 | Calgary Flames | NHL | 1 | 1 | 0 | 1 | 0 | 6 | 0 | 0 | 0 | 2 |
| 1980–81 | Rochester Americans | AHL | 18 | 6 | 2 | 8 | 6 | — | — | — | — | — |
| 1980–81 | Birmingham Bulls | CHL | 48 | 15 | 14 | 29 | 18 | — | — | — | — | — |
| 1981–82 | Calgary Flames | NHL | 9 | 3 | 0 | 3 | 0 | — | — | — | — | — |
| 1981–82 | Oklahoma City Stars | CHL | 63 | 27 | 21 | 48 | 21 | 4 | 0 | 1 | 1 | 6 |
| 1982–83 | Calgary Flames | NHL | 60 | 11 | 12 | 23 | 23 | 4 | 0 | 0 | 0 | 4 |
| 1983–84 | Calgary Flames | NHL | 29 | 6 | 5 | 11 | 2 | — | — | — | — | — |
| NHL totals | | | 99 | 21 | 17 | 38 | 25 | 10 | 0 | 0 | 0 | 6 |

=== International ===
| Year | Team | Event | GP | G | A | Pts | PIM |
|---|---|---|---|---|---|---|---|
| 1980 | Canada | OLY | 6 | 3 | 4 | 7 | 4 |
| Senior totals | | | 6 | 3 | 4 | 7 | 4 |
