= Takeshi Iwamoto =

Japanese ice hockey player

Personal information
- Nationality: Japanese
- Born: 9 June 1949 (age 75); Hokkaido, Japan

Sport
- Sport: Ice hockey

Takeshi Iwamoto (岩本 武志, Iwamoto Takeshi, born 9 June 1949) is a Japanese ice hockey player. He competed in the men's tournament at the 1980 Winter Olympics.
