= Dave Silk =

American ice hockey player

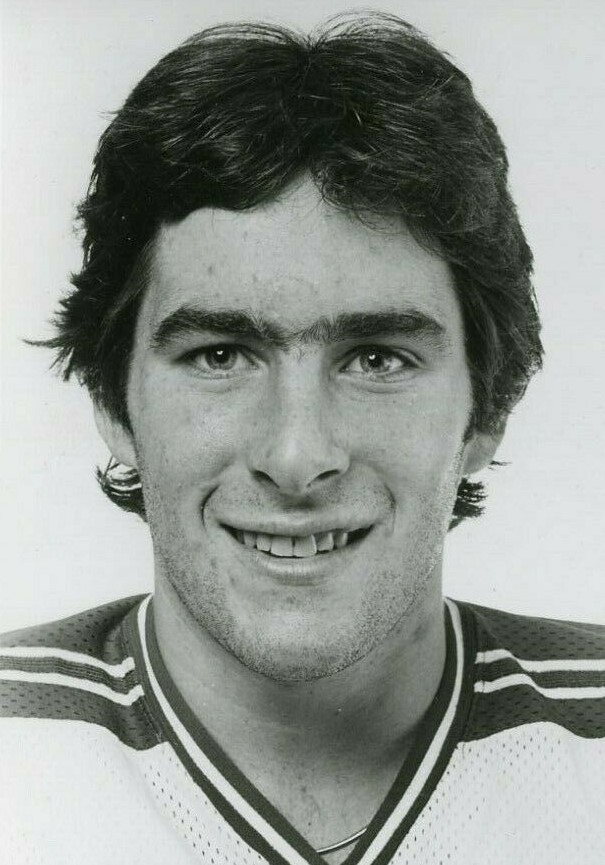
- Born: January 1, 1958 (age 68) Scituate, Massachusetts, U.S.
- Height: 5 ft 11 in (180 cm)
- Weight: 190 lb (86 kg; 13 st 8 lb)
- Position: Right Wing
- Shot: Right
- Played for: NHL; New York Rangers; Boston Bruins; Detroit Red Wings; Winnipeg Jets; Eishockey-Bundesliga; Mannheimer ERC; BSC Preussen
- National team: United States
- NHL draft: 59th overall, 1978; New York Rangers
- Playing career: 1980–1991
Medal record
Men's ice hockey
Representing the United States
Olympic Games
Gold medal – first place	1980 Lake Placid	Team

David Mark Silk (born January 1, 1958) is an American former professional ice hockey player. His professional career, which spanned 13 years, included 249 NHL regular season games with the Boston Bruins, Winnipeg Jets, Detroit Red Wings and New York Rangers. Silk is arguably most famous for being a member of the 1980 US Men's hockey team that won the gold medal at the Olympics in Lake Placid. He is the cousin of former NHL and Boston Bruins player Mike Milbury.

== Amateur career ==
Silk was born in Scituate, Massachusetts, and raised in Scituate and Cohasset, Massachusetts. He attended Thayer Academy in Braintree, where he scored 85 points in his first season. He then moved to Boston University where he became teammates and lifelong friends with future Miracle on Ice members Mike Eruzione, Jim Craig, and Jack O'Callahan. Silk was a dominating force for the Boston University Terriers hockey team, earning all-tournament, athlete of the week, and First- Team-All- New England honors. He won the NCAA Championship in 1978 with Boston University, and was awarded New England Rookie of the Year 1976–1977.

== Professional career ==
Drafted 59th overall by the New York Rangers in the 1978 NHL entry draft, Silk signed a contract with the Rangers on March 3, 1980, days after the Olympic gold medal game. He spent the next three seasons as a Ranger, playing mostly at right wing and center. Silk realized a childhood dream when he was traded to the Boston Bruins in 1983. He was claimed off waivers by the Detroit Red Wings the following season. After becoming a free agent in 1985, Silk signed with the Winnipeg Jets, finished his NHL career, and moved on to Germany for the 1986–87 season.

== Post-playing career ==
Silk retired from hockey in 1991, returning to his alma mater Boston University where he served as the assistant men's hockey coach while attending BU's graduate school of management. Silk has been inducted into the United States Hockey Hall of Fame, United States Olympic Hall of Fame, Boston University Hall of Fame, Sports Illustrated, Sportsman of the Year, Thayer Academy Hall of Fame and also inducted into the Massachusetts Hockey Hall of Fame (NHL + Amateur).

Silk competes in Ironman triathlons.

== In popular culture ==
Rick Dano played Silk in the 1981 TV movie Miracle on Ice.

Bobby Hanson played him in the 2004 Disney film Miracle. Hanson played his college hockey at Boston University, where Silk, Jack O'Callahan, and Mike Eruzione had played. After college, Hanson played professional hockey in Europe, before a knee injury ended his career.

== Awards and achievements ==
Award	Year
All-NCAA All-Tournament Team	1977, 1978
All-ECAC Hockey Second Team	1977–78

== Career statistics ==
=== Regular season and playoffs ===
			Regular season					Playoffs
Season	Team	League	GP	G	A	Pts	PIM	GP	G	A	Pts	PIM
1975–76	Thayer Academy	HS-Prep	25	50	35	85	—	—	—	—	—	—
1976–77	Boston University	ECAC	34	35	30	65	50	—	—	—	—	—
1977–78	Boston University	ECAC	28	27	31	58	57	—	—	—	—	—
1978–79	Boston University	ECAC	23	8	12	20	20	—	—	—	—	—
1979–80	United States	Intl.	56	12	36	48	32	—	—	—	—	—
1979–80	New York Rangers	NHL	2	0	0	0	0	—	—	—	—	—
1979–80	New Haven Nighthawks	AHL	11	1	9	10	0	9	1	2	3	12
1980–81	New York Rangers	NHL	59	14	12	26	58	—	—	—	—	—
1980–81	New Haven Nighthawks	AHL	12	0	4	4	34	3	0	0	0	0
1981–82	New York Rangers	NHL	64	15	20	35	39	9	2	4	6	4
1982–83	New York Rangers	NHL	16	1	1	2	15	—	—	—	—	—
1982–83	Tulsa Oilers	CHL	40	28	29	57	67	—	—	—	—	—
1982–83	Binghamton Whalers	AHL	9	1	2	3	29	—	—	—	—	—
1983–84	Boston Bruins	NHL	35	13	17	30	64	3	0	0	0	7
1983–84	Hershey Bears	AHL	15	11	10	21	22	—	—	—	—	—
1984–85	Boston Bruins	NHL	29	7	5	12	22	—	—	—	—	—
1984–85	Detroit Red Wings	NHL	12	2	0	2	10	—	—	—	—	—
1985–86	Winnipeg Jets	NHL	32	2	4	6	63	1	0	0	0	2
1985–86	Sherbrooke Canadiens	AHL	18	5	14	19	18	—	—	—	—	—
1986–87	Mannheimer ERC	1.GBun	26	13	23	36	52	10	2	8	10	16
1987–88	Mannheimer ERC	1.GBun	29	23	17	40	46	8	5	6	11	12
1988–89	Mannheimer ERC	1.GBun	36	25	30	55	49	9	7	4	11	21
1989–90	Berliner SC Preussen	1.GBun	35	25	34	59	49	5	4	5	9	4
1990–91	Berliner SC Preussen	1.GBun	40	28	23	51	59	10	5	4	9	4
NHL totals			249	54	59	113	271	13	2	4	6	13
1.GBun totals			166	114	127	241	155	42	23	27	50	57

=== International ===
Year	Team	Event	GP	G	A	Pts	PIM
1980	United States	OG	7	2	3	5	0
