= Jack O'Callahan =

American ice hockey player

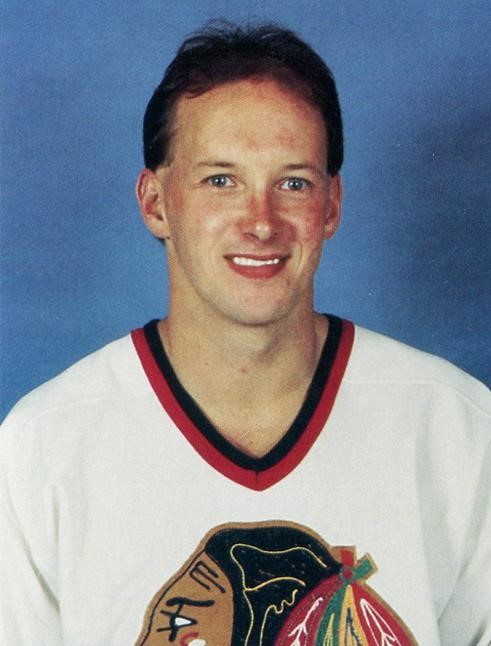
- Born: July 24, 1957 (age 69) Charlestown, Massachusetts, U.S.
- Height: 6 ft 2 in (188 cm)
- Weight: 190 lb (86 kg; 13 st 8 lb)
- Position: Defense
- Shot: Right
- Played for: Chicago Blackhawks; New Jersey Devils
- National team: United States
- NHL draft: 96th overall, 1977; Chicago Black Hawks
- WHA draft: 68th overall, 1977; Calgary Cowboys
- Playing career: 1980–1989
Medal record
Men's ice hockey
Representing the United States
Olympic Games
| Gold medal – first place | 1980 Lake Placid | Team |

John J. "Jack" O'Callahan (born July 24, 1957) is an American former professional ice hockey player who played 390 National Hockey League (NHL) regular season games between 1982 and 1989 for the Chicago Blackhawks and New Jersey Devils. Before turning professional, he was a member of the 1980 Winter Olympics United States national team that upset the Soviet Union in the "Miracle on Ice" game.

== Playing career ==
=== Amateur career ===
O'Callahan graduated from Boston Latin School in 1975 and then attended Boston University from 1975 to 1979, where he was a team captain during the 1977–78 and 1978–79 seasons and was named All-East twice, All-New England and All-America, team MVP twice, Beanpot MVP, NCAA tournament MVP, and Cochrane award winner twice. He also played for Team USA at the 1979 Ice Hockey World Championship tournament in Moscow.

The year after he graduated, O'Callahan was selected to represent the US in the 1980 Winter Olympics. Three days before the Olympics, in an exhibition match against the Soviet Union, O'Callahan injured his left knee. This forced him out of the opening game against Sweden at the Olympics. He returned for the famous "Miracle on Ice" game against the Soviet Union in the first game of the medal round.

=== Professional career ===
O'Callahan was drafted 96th overall in the 1977 NHL entry draft by the Chicago Blackhawks. He joined the Hawks after the Olympics, initially playing for two seasons in the minors for the American Hockey League New Brunswick Hawks. He finally made the Blackhawks roster in 1982 and played there until 1987 when the Hawks left him unprotected for the 1987 NHL Waiver Draft. He was claimed by the New Jersey Devils and played a further two seasons before retiring 1989. He also made a final appearance for the United States national team at the 1989 Ice Hockey World Championship tournament.

== Post career ==
Jack O'Callahan returned to Chicago after his retirement and went into the financial services business on the Chicago Mercantile Exchange. He later co-founded Beanpot Financial Services with former NHL player Jack Hughes. O'Callahan then worked on behalf of the Blackhawk Alumni Association.

== In popular culture ==
In a 1981 TV movie about the gold medal-winning U.S. hockey team called Miracle on Ice, O'Callahan is played by Peter Horton.

In the 2004 Disney film Miracle, he is played by Michael Mantenuto. Mantenuto grew up skating and playing hockey from the time he could walk. Several colleges, like Boston University (where O'Callahan and his Miracle on Ice teammates Mike Eruzione, Jim Craig, and Dave Silk once played) attempted to recruit him to play college hockey, but Mantenuto ultimately decided to play, albeit briefly, for the University of Maine. He got the part of Jack O'Callahan after he got into a fight with another actor who was picking on him during tryouts.

== Awards and achievements ==
| Award | Year |
|---|---|
| All-ECAC First Team | 1977–78; 1978–79 |
| All-NCAA All-Tournament Team | 1978 |
| AHCA East All-American | 1978–79 |

== Career statistics ==
=== Regular season and playoffs ===
| | | | Regular season | | | | | Playoffs |
| Season | Team | League | GP | G | A | Pts | PIM | GP | G | A | Pts | PIM |
|---|---|---|---|---|---|---|---|---|---|---|---|---|
| 1974–75 | Boston Latin School | HS-Prep | — | — | — | — | — | — | — | — | — | — |
| 1975–76 | Boston University | ECAC | 30 | 3 | 16 | 19 | 60 | — | — | — | — | — |
| 1976–77 | Boston University | ECAC | 31 | 1 | 23 | 24 | 90 | — | — | — | — | — |
| 1977–78 | Boston University | ECAC | 31 | 8 | 47 | 55 | 61 | — | — | — | — | — |
| 1978–79 | Boston University | ECAC | 29 | 6 | 16 | 22 | 72 | — | — | — | — | — |
| 1979–80 | United States | Intl. | 55 | 7 | 30 | 37 | 85 | — | — | — | — | — |
| 1980–81 | New Brunswick Hawks | AHL | 78 | 9 | 25 | 34 | 167 | 13 | 1 | 6 | 7 | 36 |
| 1981–82 | New Brunswick Hawks | AHL | 79 | 15 | 33 | 48 | 130 | 15 | 2 | 6 | 8 | 24 |
| 1982–83 | Chicago Black Hawks | NHL | 39 | 0 | 11 | 11 | 46 | 5 | 0 | 2 | 2 | 2 |
| 1982–83 | Springfield Indians | AHL | 35 | 2 | 24 | 26 | 25 | — | — | — | — | — |
| 1983–84 | Chicago Black Hawks | NHL | 70 | 4 | 13 | 17 | 67 | 2 | 0 | 0 | 0 | 2 |
| 1984–85 | Chicago Black Hawks | NHL | 66 | 6 | 8 | 14 | 105 | 15 | 3 | 5 | 8 | 25 |
| 1985–86 | Chicago Black Hawks | NHL | 80 | 4 | 19 | 23 | 116 | 3 | 0 | 1 | 1 | 4 |
| 1986–87 | Chicago Blackhawks | NHL | 48 | 1 | 13 | 14 | 59 | 2 | 0 | 0 | 0 | 0 |
| 1987–88 | New Jersey Devils | NHL | 50 | 7 | 19 | 26 | 97 | 5 | 1 | 3 | 4 | 6 |
| 1988–89 | New Jersey Devils | NHL | 30 | 5 | 21 | 26 | 51 | — | — | — | — | — |
| NHL totals | | | 389 | 27 | 104 | 131 | 541 | 32 | 4 | 11 | 15 | 41 |

=== International ===
| Year | Team | Event | GP | G | A | Pts | PIM |
|---|---|---|---|---|---|---|---|
| 1979 | United States | WC | 8 | 0 | 1 | 1 | 12 |
| 1980 | United States | OG | 4 | 0 | 1 | 1 | 2 |
| 1989 | United States | WC | 10 | 0 | 2 | 2 | 14 |
| Senior totals | | | 22 | 0 | 4 | 4 | 28 |

Awards and achievements
| Preceded by Julian Baretta | NCAA Tournament Most Outstanding Player; 1978 | Succeeded by Steve Janaszak |
