= Ken Morrow =

American ice hockey player (born 1956)

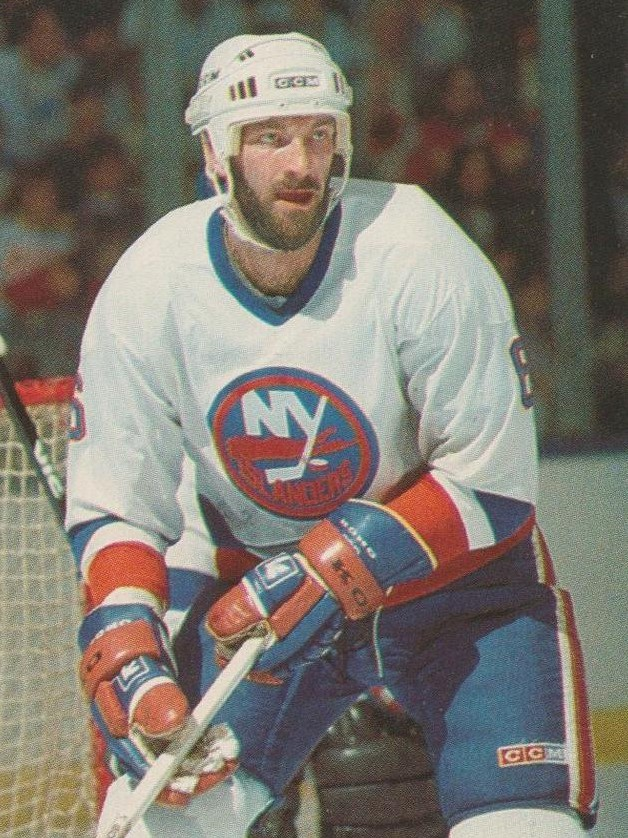
- Morrow with the New York Islanders in 1986
- Born: October 17, 1956 (age 70) Flint, Michigan, U.S.
- Height: 6 ft 4 in (193 cm)
- Weight: 205 lb (93 kg; 14 st 9 lb)
- Position: Defense
- Shot: Right
- Played for: New York Islanders
- National team: United States
- NHL draft: 68th overall, 1976; New York Islanders
- WHA draft: 86th overall, 1976; New England Whalers
- Playing career: 1980–1989
Medal record
Men's ice hockey
Representing the United States
Olympic Games
Gold medal – first place	1980 Lake Placid	Team competition

Kenneth Arlington Morrow (born October 17, 1956) is an American former professional ice hockey defenseman and author. He was a member of the 1980 USA Olympic Miracle on Ice hockey team. He is currently serving as the New York Islanders' director of pro scouting. A member of the United States Hockey Hall of Fame, he played 550 regular season games in the National Hockey League between 1980 and 1989.

== Amateur career ==
Ken Morrow was born in Flint and grew up in the nearby town of Davison, Michigan. He is a graduate of Davison High School. Morrow attended Bowling Green State University in Bowling Green, Ohio where he was a star defenseman and also represented Team USA at the 1978 Ice Hockey World Championship. In 1979, he was named Central Collegiate Hockey Association player of the year.

The following season, Morrow played for the 1980 U.S. Olympic hockey team that beat the Soviet team in an event known as the Miracle on Ice during the 1980 Winter Olympics before defeating Finland to win the gold medal.

== Professional career ==
Selected 68th overall by the New York Islanders in the 1976 NHL entry draft, Morrow joined the Islanders immediately following the Olympics. He helped the team win its first Stanley Cup in 1980, becoming the first player to win both an Olympic gold medal and a Stanley Cup in the same season. He was a member of all four Islanders championship teams, which won consecutive Stanley Cups in 1980, 1981, 1982, and 1983. Although not known as a prolific scorer, Morrow scored several important goals during the Islanders' playoff runs. He also returned to the United States national team for the 1981 Canada Cup.

One of the most notable moments of Morrow's professional career came in Game 5 of the Islanders' first-round playoff series against the New York Rangers in 1984, when he scored the series-clinching goal.

During the 1980 and 1983 playoffs, Morrow underwent arthroscopic knee surgery and returned to action only days later to help the Islanders' championship efforts, often having fluid drained from his knees between games. Persistent knee problems eventually forced him to retire during the 1988–89 season.

== Post-playing career ==
Morrow, who was inducted into the United States Hockey Hall of Fame in 1995, has been director of pro scouting for the Isles since 1993. He previously served as the Islanders' assistant coach for one season, in 1991–92. He was also co-coach of the International Hockey League's Kansas City franchise in 1990–91 and assistant coach of the IHL Flint Spirits in 1989–90 shortly after retiring from hockey. On December 31, 2011, Morrow was inducted into the New York Islanders Hall of Fame. Ken Morrow is also President of KCIce, an Outdoor Ice Rink Development and Management company in Kansas City, MO.

== In popular culture ==
In the 1981 TV movie about the 1980 gold medal-winning U.S. Hockey team called Miracle on Ice, he is played by Scott Feraco.

Morrow was portrayed by actor Casey Burnette in the 2004 Walt Disney Studios film Miracle. Before the events of the movie, Burnette played junior hockey for the Barrie Colts in the Ontario Hockey League, the Hull Olympiques (now called the Gatineau Olympiques) and the Montreal Rocket, both in the Quebec Major Junior Hockey League. Burnette is clean-shaven in the film, although the real Morrow had a beard at the time the film is set. While most of the players on the team were not allowed to wear facial hair, coach Herb Brooks specifically allowed Morrow to keep his beard, since Morrow had a beard prior to joining the team.

== Awards and achievements ==
Award	Year
All-CCHA First Team	1975–76
All-CCHA Second Team	1976–77
All-CCHA First Team	1977–78
AHCA West All-American	1977–78
All-CCHA First Team	1978–79
CCHA Player of the Year	1978–79
Gold medal US Olympic Team	1980 Winter Olympics
Stanley Cup champion	1980, 1981, 1982, 1983
Lester Patrick Trophy	1995–96

== Career statistics ==
=== Regular season and playoffs ===
			Regular season					Playoffs
Season	Team	League	GP	G	A	Pts	PIM	GP	G	A	Pts	PIM
1974–75	Davison High School	High-MI	—	—	—	—	—	—	—	—	—	—
1975–76	Bowling Green State University	CCHA	31	4	15	19	34	—	—	—	—	—
1976–77	Bowling Green State University	CCHA	39	7	22	29	22	—	—	—	—	—
1977–78	Bowling Green State University	CCHA	39	8	18	26	26	—	—	—	—	—
1978–79	Bowling Green State University	CCHA	45	15	37	52	22	—	—	—	—	—
1979–80	United States	Intl.	56	4	18	22	6	—	—	—	—	—
1979–80	New York Islanders	NHL	18	0	3	3	4	20	1	2	3	12
1980–81	New York Islanders	NHL	80	2	11	13	20	18	3	4	7	8
1981–82	New York Islanders	NHL	75	1	18	19	56	19	0	4	4	8
1982–83	New York Islanders	NHL	79	5	11	16	44	19	5	7	12	18
1983–84	New York Islanders	NHL	63	3	11	14	45	20	1	2	3	20
1984–85	New York Islanders	NHL	15	1	7	8	14	10	0	0	0	17
1985–86	New York Islanders	NHL	69	0	12	12	22	2	0	0	0	4
1986–87	New York Islanders	NHL	64	3	8	11	32	13	1	3	4	2
1987–88	New York Islanders	NHL	53	1	4	5	40	6	0	0	0	8
1988–89	New York Islanders	NHL	34	1	3	4	32	—	—	—	—	—
NHL totals			550	17	88	105	309	127	11	22	33	97

=== International ===
Year	Team	Event	GP	G	A	Pts	PIM
1978	United States	WC	6	0	0	0	0
1980	United States	OG	7	1	2	3	6
1981	United States	CC	6	0	0	0	6
Senior totals			19	1	2	3	12

== See also ==
- List of members of the United States Hockey Hall of Fame

Awards and achievements
Preceded by John Markell / Don Waddell	CCHA Player of the Year; 1978–79	Succeeded by Steve Weeks
