= Phil Verchota =

American ice hockey player (born 1956)

- Born: December 28, 1956 (age 69) Duluth, Minnesota, U.S.
- Height: 6 ft 2 in (188 cm)
- Weight: 194 lb (88 kg; 13 st 12 lb)
- Position: Left wing
- Shot: Left
- Played for: Jokerit
- National team: United States
- NHL draft: 75th overall, 1976; Minnesota North Stars
- WHA draft: 79th overall, 1976; Calgary Cowboys
- Playing career: 1979–1984
Medal record
Men's ice hockey
Representing the United States
Olympic Games
Gold medal – first place	1980 Lake Placid	Team competition

Phillip John Verchota (born December 28, 1956) is an American former ice hockey forward. He is best known for being a member of the 1980 U.S. Olympic hockey team that won the gold medal in the event known as the Miracle on Ice. He was the captain of the U.S. hockey team at the 1984 Winter Olympics.

== College career ==
Verchota attended Duluth East High School where he also was a star defensive tackle in gridiron football and recruited for both football and hockey at the University of Minnesota. However, he chose not to play on the football team and devoted all attention on playing hockey for the Minnesota Gophers. Verchota was a member of the 1976 and 1979 NCAA championship teams coached by Herb Brooks.

== International/club career ==
Verchota made his international debut at the 1979 Ice Hockey World Championship in Moscow after his college career had ended. He then joined the U.S. Olympic team on a full-time basis for the 1979-80 season.

After the Olympics, Verchota opted to play overseas with Jokerit in Finland rather than sign a contract with the Minnesota North Stars, who had drafted him 75th overall in the 1976 NHL entry draft (he also turned down an offer from the North Stars in 1977 to leave U. of Minnesota early). Verchota also played for the U.S. national team at the 1981 Ice Hockey World Championship tournament in Stockholm before taking a one-year sabbatical from hockey.

He rejoined the U.S. national team as a full-time player in 1982–83 and helped the United States win the ice hockey world championship "Pool B" qualifying tournament in the spring of 1983. He continued with the US national program until the 1984 Winter Olympics in Sarajevo, and retired from hockey afterwards.

== Post-playing career ==
Verchota (who is a business administration major and Williams Scholar at University of Minnesota) went into banking after retirement and became senior vice president of First American Bank in Willmar, Minnesota. He was named one of the 50 greatest players in University of Minnesota hockey history as part of "Legends on Ice" tribute in 2001. His skates from 1980 are part of the National Museum of American History collection.

== In popular culture ==
Verchota is not featured in a 1981 TV movie about the 1980 U.S. hockey team called Miracle on Ice, but does appear in archival footage of the medal ceremony where he is awarded the gold medal.

In the 2004 Disney film Miracle, he is played by Kris Wilson, who in 2002 led the University of Wisconsin-Superior to the NCAA Division III hockey championship.

== Career statistics ==
=== Regular season and playoffs ===
			Regular season					Playoffs
Season	Team	League	GP	G	A	Pts	PIM	GP	G	A	Pts	PIM
1974–75	East High School	MSHSL	43	14	29	43	21	—	—	—	—	—
1975–76	University of Minnesota	WCHA	42	8	3	11	55	—	—	—	—	—
1976–77	University of Minnesota	WCHA	41	21	19	40	45	—	—	—	—	—
1977–78	University of Minnesota	WCHA	34	12	15	27	32	—	—	—	—	—
1978–79	University of Minnesota	WCHA	44	18	24	42	52	—	—	—	—	—
1979–80	United States	Intl	54	16	22	38	48	—	—	—	—	—
1980–81	Jokerit	Liiga	32	15	7	22	42	—	—	—	—	—
1982–83	United States	Intl	42	30	15	45	36	—	—	—	—	—
WCHA totals			161	59	61	120	184	—	—	—	—	—

=== International ===
Year	Team	Event	GP	G	A	Pts	PIM
1979	United States	WC	8	2	3	5	2
1980	United States	OG	7	3	2	5	8
1981	United States	WC	8	0	3	3	4
1984	United States	OG	6	2	2	4	0
Senior totals			29	7	10	17	14
