= Paweł Łukaszka =

Polish ice hockey player

- Born: February 6, 1962 (age 63); Nowy Targ, Poland
- Height: 5 ft 10 in (178 cm)
- Weight: 183 lb (83 kg; 13 st 1 lb)
- Position: Goaltender
- Played for: Podhale Nowy Targ
- National team: Poland
- NHL draft: Undrafted
- Playing career: 1978–1990

Paweł Łukaszka (born February 6, 1962) is a former Polish ice hockey goaltender. He played for the Poland men's national ice hockey team at 1980 Winter Olympics in Lake Placid.
