= John Harrington (ice hockey) =

American ice hockey player and coach

- Born: May 24, 1957 (age 69) Virginia, Minnesota, U.S.
- Height: 5 ft 10 in (178 cm)
- Weight: 180 lb (82 kg; 12 st 12 lb)
- Position: Right wing
- Shot: Right
- Played for: CHL; Oklahoma City Stars; Birmingham South Stars; Colorado Flames; AHL; Rochester Americans; NDA; HC Lugano
- National team: United States
- Playing career: 1979–1984
Medal record
Men's ice hockey
Representing the United States
Olympic Games
| Gold medal – first place | 1980 Lake Placid | Team |

John "Bah" Harrington (born May 24, 1957) is an American former ice hockey forward and was the head coach of the Minnesota State Mavericks women's ice hockey of the Western Collegiate Hockey Association for nine seasons from 2015 to 2024.

== Playing career ==
Harrington was a stand-out high school hockey athlete for Virginia High School in Minnesota's hockey-rich Iron Range under head coach Dave Hendrickson. After Harrington's senior season at Virginia, University of Minnesota Duluth (UMD) assistant head coach Mike Sertich urged Harrington to try out for the hockey team. With Sertich's backing, Harrington won a walk-on spot on UMD's roster. He lettered for four seasons at UMD from 1975 to 1979.

Following his collegiate playing career, Harrington was invited to try out for the 1979–80 US National team coached by the Minnesota Golden Gophers' Herb Brooks. Harrington made every cut and was placed on the Olympic roster for the 1980 Lake Placid games. The team went on to defeat the highly favored Soviet Union 4–3 in the first game of the Medal Round in an event named the "Miracle on Ice". The team defeated Finland 4–2 two days later to capture the Gold Medal for the US. Harrington is credited with an assist on Mike Eruzione's go-ahead game-winning goal against the USSR.

Undrafted by the NHL, Harrington had a try-out with the Buffalo Sabres following the Olympics. The Sabres immediately assigned him to the Rochester Americans of the AHL, where he scored seven points in twelve games despite being a marked man. "Some Canadian-born kids resent the fact that the Americans did so well in the Olympics and they're a bit jealous of them," claimed Buffalo defenseman Larry Playfair. In one game Harrington was struck in the face and needed six stitches to close a bloody gash on his chin. In another game against the Hershey Bears Harrington was attacked from behind by Lou Franceschetti and knocked unconscious for five minutes, lying in a pool of blood on the ice. He had to spend the night in a hospital with a concussion, fractured jaw, broken nose and four loosened teeth. Franceshetti was not penalized, insisting it was a "clean" check. "My shoulder just connected with the back of his neck." "If it was a clean check, how did I get it in the back of my head?" asked Harrington. "Lying in my hospital bed, I had all sorts of mixed emotions, especially when my teeth ached and my heart throbbed. I kept thinking of the cleaner game in Europe, that I could have gone to Switzerland to play hockey. Something like this can't help but discourage you. But this is the way it is in the pros and I'll make it one way or the other ... even if I have to face a few goofballs."

Harrington played the 1980–81 season for Lugano in the Swiss league before returning to the US to play with the US National team from 1981 to 1983 on a full-time basis. He was a member of the United States team at the 1981, 1982 and 1983 Ice Hockey World Championship tournaments. Between brief stints in the Central Hockey League, Harrington rejoined the national hockey team for the 1984 Winter Olympics.

== Coaching career ==
Following 1984, Harrington retired from playing and rejoined his college roots as an assistant coach under former Montreal Canadiens star Ralph Backstrom at the University of Denver. The highlight of Harrington's time at Denver was 1985-86 when Denver won a school record 34 games and advanced to the NCAA Frozen Four. In 1990 Harrington returned to Minnesota as an assistant coach for St. Cloud State University.

From 1993 to 2008, Harrington was the head hockey coach at Saint John's University in Collegeville, Minnesota. Harrington turned around a listless program at Saint John's. By his fourth season he had guided SJU to a school-record 26-6-1 mark, the school's first conference championship since 1950, the school's first conference playoff championship, the school's first NCAA tournament berth and an NCAA third-place victory. In 15 seasons at Saint John's he has a career record of 241-142-31 (.620). He has won five MIAC titles, four MIAC playoff championships and has advanced to the NCAA tournament five times. Harrington is the school leader in career wins. In addition to his coaching duties, Harrington was the assistant athletic director at Saint John's.

It was announced on March 31, 2008, that Harrington would step down as head coach at Saint John's to become head coach for HC Ambri-Piotta of the Swiss National League, his brief tenure lasting only until December 16. On January 19, 2009, Harrington signed a contract as head coach for Slovenia men's national ice hockey team, a position he held until December 12, 2010, when he was succeeded by Matjaž Kopitar. On May 11, 2009, Harrington signed a contract with HC Asiago, where he served as head coach until 2011.

In May 2015, after serving four years as an amateur scout for the NHL's Colorado Avalanche, Harrington was named the head coach of the Minnesota State Mavericks women's ice hockey team of the Western Collegiate Hockey Association (WCHA).

On March 10, 2024, after spending nine seasons as the head coach, Harrington announced his retirement. He served temporarily as Special Assistant to the Athletic Director before retiring on June 30, 2024. Harrington finished with an 85-198-25 overall record, which is the second best by a head coach in Mavericks history.

== In film ==
As part of the 1980 Olympic team, Harrington has been portrayed in movies twice, with the more recent being Disney's 2004 release Miracle. Harrington is portrayed by Nate Miller, who played hockey at the University of Minnesota from 1997 to 2000.

Harrington was portrayed by Bill Schreiner in the 1981 made-for-TV movie Miracle on Ice.

== Personal life ==
Harrington is married and has three children. He is the father of Chris Harrington, team captain and four-year letter winner on the Minnesota Golden Gopher hockey team from 2002 to 2006 and currently a DEG Metro Stars defenseman.

== "Bah" ==
Among family, friends and those who knew him in his high school and college playing days, Harrington is known almost exclusively as "Bah". He earned the nickname from his older brother who was barely a year old when John was born. The brother couldn't enunciate the word baby and instead referred to his new sibling as "bah." The name stuck. The rest of his siblings have nicknames too, including "TP", "Tootie", and "Muggs".

== Career statistics ==
=== Regular season and playoffs ===
| | | | Regular season | | | | | Playoffs |
| Season | Team | League | GP | G | A | Pts | PIM | GP | G | A | Pts | PIM |
|---|---|---|---|---|---|---|---|---|---|---|---|---|
| 1974–75 | Virginia High School | HS-MN | — | — | — | — | — | — | — | — | — | — |
| 1975–76 | University of Minnesota Duluth | WCHA | 36 | 9 | 12 | 21 | 14 | — | — | — | — | — |
| 1976–77 | University of Minnesota Duluth | WCHA | 27 | 5 | 9 | 14 | 16 | — | — | — | — | — |
| 1977–78 | University of Minnesota Duluth | WCHA | 31 | 22 | 9 | 31 | 20 | — | — | — | — | — |
| 1978–79 | University of Minnesota Duluth | WCHA | 40 | 29 | 43 | 72 | 16 | — | — | — | — | — |
| 1978–79 | Oklahoma City Stars | CHL | 5 | 0 | 1 | 1 | 2 | — | — | — | — | — |
| 1979–80 | American National Team | Intl | 51 | 14 | 18 | 32 | 14 | — | — | — | — | — |
| 1979–80 | Rochester Americans | AHL | 12 | 4 | 3 | 7 | 8 | 3 | 1 | 0 | 1 | 0 |
| 1980–81 | HC Lugano | SWI-2 | 28 | 33 | 18 | 51 | 22 | — | — | — | — | — |
| 1982–83 | American National Team | Intl | 51 | 27 | 36 | 63 | 38 | — | — | — | — | — |
| 1982–83 | Birmingham South Stars | CHL | — | — | — | — | — | 1 | 0 | 0 | 0 | 0 |
| 1983–84 | Colorado Flames | CHL | 10 | 5 | 5 | 10 | 4 | 6 | 2 | 3 | 5 | 2 |
| WCHA totals | | | 134 | 65 | 73 | 138 | 66 | — | — | — | — | — |

=== International ===
| Year | Team | Event | GP | G | A | Pts | PIM |
|---|---|---|---|---|---|---|---|
| 1980 | United States | OLY | 7 | 0 | 5 | 5 | 2 |
| 1981 | United States | WC | 1 | 0 | 0 | 0 | 2 |
| 1982 | United States | WC | 6 | 0 | 0 | 0 | 4 |
| 1983 | United States | WC-B | 7 | 5 | 6 | 11 | — |
| 1984 | United States | OLY | 6 | 0 | 0 | 0 | 6 |
| Senior totals | | | 20 | 0 | 5 | 5 | 14 |
