= Paul Pageau =

Canadian ice hockey player

- Born: October 1, 1959 (age 65); Montreal, Quebec, Canada
- Height: 5 ft 9 in (175 cm)
- Weight: 160 lb (73 kg; 11 st 6 lb)
- Position: Goaltender
- Caught: Left
- Played for: Los Angeles Kings
- National team: Canada
- NHL draft: undrafted
- Playing career: 1980–1985

Paul Pageau (born October 1, 1959) is a Canadian former ice hockey goaltender who played one game in the National Hockey League for the Los Angeles Kings during the 1980–81 season, on February 3, 1981 against the New York Islanders. The rest of his career, which lasted from 1980 to 1986, was spent in the minor leagues. Internationally Pageau played for the Canadian national team at the 1980 Winter Olympics.

== Biography ==
As a youth, Pageau played in the 1972 Quebec International Pee-Wee Hockey Tournament with a minor ice hockey team from Gatineau. He played his Quebec Junior hockey with the Quebec Remparts and the Shawinigan Cataractes. After the NHL he spent 6 years in the minor leagues.

Pageau represented Canada at the 1980 Winter Olympics held in Lake Placid, where he was the goalie in 4 games, a win versus Poland and a shutout against Japan, and two losses in decisive games against USSR and Finland.

As of 2024 he was Vice President Ontario at Slush Puppie Canada Inc. based in Stoney Creek, Ontario.

== Career statistics ==
=== Regular season and playoffs ===
			Regular season									Playoffs
Season	Team	League	GP	W	L	T	MIN	GA	SO	GAA	SV%	GP	W	L	MIN	GA	SO	GAA	SV%
1976–77	Quebec Remparts	QMJHL	19	11	1	3	955	56	0	3.52	.887	—	—	—	—	—	—	—	—
1977–78	Quebec Remparts	QMJHL	33	9	14	5	1656	138	0	4.98	.862	3	0	1	83	8	0	5.78	.810
1978–79	Quebec Remparts	QMJHL	7	4	1	0	345	28	0	4.87	.840	—	—	—	—	—	—	—	—
1978–79	Shawinigan Cataractes	QMJHL	43	18	19	4	2352	199	0	5.08	.852	4	0	4	236	27	0	6.86	.833
1979–80	Shawinigan Cataractes	QMJHL	43	19	19	4	2438	175	2	4.31	.879	7	3	4	421	34	0	4.85	.875
1979–80	Canadian National Team	Intl	10	—	—	—	506	16	1	1.89	—	—	—	—	—	—	—	—	—
1980–81	Los Angeles Kings	NHL	1	0	1	0	60	8	0	8.00	.765	—	—	—	—	—	—	—	—
1980–81	Houston Apollos	CHL	21	9	9	3	1282	64	0	3.00	.884	—	—	—	—	—	—	—	—
1980–81	Oklahoma City Stars	CHL	11	4	4	0	590	32	0	3.25	.890	—	—	—	—	—	—	—	—
1980–81	Saginaw Gears	IHL	1	—	—	—	60	4	0	4.00	—	—	—	—	—	—	—	—	—
1981–82	Saginaw Gears	IHL	29	—	—	—	1621	140	0	5.18	—	4	—	—	249	18	0	4.34	—
1982–83	Saginaw Gears	IHL	11	—	—	—	614	47	0	4.59	—	—	—	—	—	—	—	—	—
1982–83	New Haven Nighthawks	AHL	37	17	14	2	1939	123	2	3.81	.873	6	2	3	374	21	0	3.37	—
1983–84	Sherbrooke Jets	AHL	45	12	26	3	2432	205	0	5.06	.861	—	—	—	—	—	—	—	—
1984–85	Sherbrooke Canadiens	AHL	20	8	11	0	1074	66	0	3.69	.870	3	0	1	80	5	0	3.75	—
1984–85	Flint Generals	IHL	6	0	5	0	331	37	0	6.71	—	—	—	—	—	—	—	—	—
1985–86	Sherbrooke Canadiens	AHL	31	9	14	6	1767	132	0	4.48	.866	—	—	—	—	—	—	—	—
NHL totals			1	0	1	0	60	8	0	8.00	.765	—	—	—	—	—	—	—	—

=== International ===
Year	Team	Event	GP	W	L	T	MIN	GA	SO	GAA	SV%
1980	Canada	OLY	4	2	1	0	238	11	1	2.77	.882
Senior totals			4	2	1	0	238	11	1	2.77	.882

== See also ==
- List of players who played only one game in the NHL
