= Karl-Gustav Kaisla =

Swedish ice hockey referee

- Born: 4 October 1943; Helsinki, Finland
- Died: 21 September 2012 (aged 68); Helsinki, Finland
- Occupation: Ice hockey referee

Karl-Gustav Kaisla (4 October 1943 in Helsinki – 21 September 2012 in Helsinki) was a Finnish ice hockey referee. He officiated in three World Championships and in one Olympic Tournament.

He was the referee for the Miracle on Ice game on February 22 1980, when the United States faced the Soviet Union during the 1980 Olympic Games at Lake Placid.

After his active hockey career was finished, Kaisla worked as a supervisor of other referees.
