= Valerian Netedu =

Romanian ice hockey player

- Card from 1979
- Born: January 26, 1953 (age 73) Bucharest, Romania
- Position: Goaltender
- National team: Romania
- NHL draft: Undrafted
- Playing career: 1972–1989

Valerian Netedu (born January 26, 1953) is a former Romanian ice hockey goaltender. He played for the Romania men's national ice hockey team at the 1976 Winter Olympics in Innsbruck, and the 1980 Winter Olympics in Lake Placid.
