= Thore Wålberg =

Norwegian ice hockey player

- Born: August 19, 1953 (age 73) Grue, Norway
- Height: 183 cm (6 ft 0 in)
- Weight: 82 kg (181 lb; 12 st 13 lb)
- Position: Goaltender
- Played for: Frisk Asker
- National team: Norway
- Playing career: 1970–1981

Thore Johannes Wålberg (born August 19, 1953) is a Norwegian ice hockey goaltender. He was born in Oslo, Norway and represented the club IF Frisk Asker. He played for the Norwegian national ice hockey team, and participated at the Winter Olympics in 1972 and 1980.
