= Tore Falch Nilsen =

Norwegian ice hockey player

Personal information
- Born: 27 March 1948 Oslo, Norway
- Died: 8 June 2008 (aged 60)

Sport
- Sport: Ice hockey
- Club: Hasle-Løren IL

Tore Falch Nilsen (27 March 1948 – 8 June 2008) was a Norwegian ice hockey player. He was born in Oslo and played for the club Hasle-Løren IL. He played for the Norwegian national ice hockey team at the 1980 Winter Olympics.
