= Gheorghe Huțan =

Romanian ice hockey player

- Born: April 8, 1954; Rădăuți, Romania
- Died: April 10, 2019 (aged 65)
- Height: 5 ft 7 in (170 cm)
- Weight: 157 lb (71 kg; 11 st 3 lb)
- Position: Goaltender
- National team: Romania
- NHL draft: Undrafted
- Playing career: 1978–1993

Gheorghe Huţan (April 8, 1954 – April 10, 2019) was a Romanian ice hockey goaltender. He played for the Romania men's national ice hockey team at the 1980 Winter Olympics in Lake Placid.
