= Henryk Wojtynek =

Polish ice hockey player

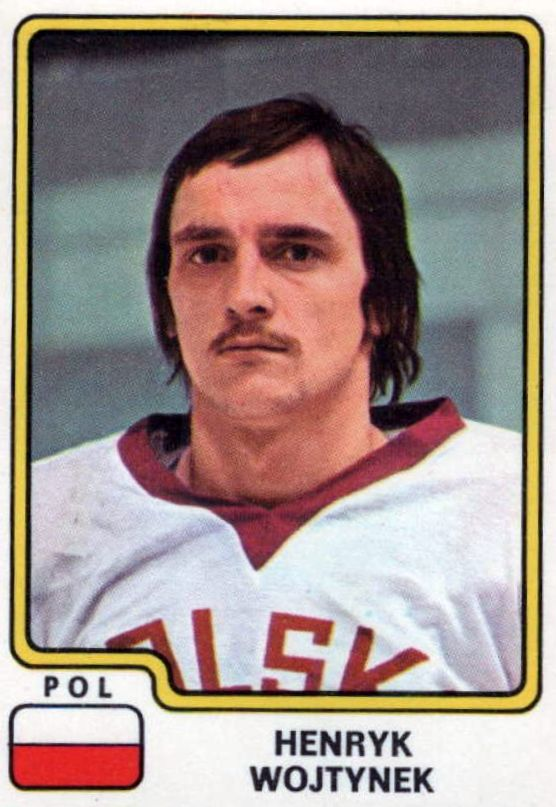
- Born: March 23, 1950 (age 75); Katowice, Poland
- Height: 5 ft 10 in (178 cm)
- Weight: 165 lb (75 kg; 11 st 11 lb)
- Position: Goaltender
- Played for: Naprzod Janow
- National team: Poland
- NHL draft: Undrafted
- Playing career: 1973–1985

Henryk Tomasz Wojtynek (born March 23, 1950) is a former Polish ice hockey goaltender. He played for the Poland men's national ice hockey team at 1980 Winter Olympics in Lake Placid.
