= Hockeyfeber =

1983 film

- Directed by: Oddvar Bull Tuhus
- Written by: Oddvar Bull Tuhus; Bjarne Rønning
- Produced by: Svein H. Toreg; Ola Solum
- Starring: Rune Dybedahl; Liv Bernhoft Osa; Jörn Donner; Sverre Anker Ousdal; Per Theodor Haugen; Rolf Søder
- Cinematography: Halvor Næss
- Edited by: Bjørn Breigutu
- Music by: Geir Bøhren; Bent Åserud
- Distributed by: Norsk Film A/S
- Release date: October 7, 1983
- Running time: 104 minutes
- Country: Norway
- Language: Norwegian

Hockeyfeber (Hockey Fever) is a Norwegian sports drama film from 1983 directed by Oddvar Bull Tuhus. The main roles are played by Rune Dybedahl, Liv Bernhoft Osa, Jörn Donner, Sverre Anker Ousdal, Per Theodor Haugen, and Rolf Søder.

== Plot ==
Hockeyfeber is a story about not only clashes on the ice, but also about life as it fades in the harsh environment in which amateur sports take place. The film depicts the sports environment in good and bad ways, and it shows how tough and cynical the demands on the athletes become when winning the sponsors' favor is most important.

The ice hockey team Manglerud Star is moving down from the first division. Ricky (Rune Dybedahl) is one of the players on the team, and he falls in love with Vera (Liv Bernhoft Osa), who is involved with horses. It is not easy for Ricky to combine his relationship with Vera with the intense training needed to qualify for the next season. In addition, the difficult situation makes the players depressed, and both friendship and the joy of the sport are at stake. However, the managers have many ideas, and they are eager to adopt new methods of raising funds for the club. They also want to acquire a coach with an international profile. Recruiting players, sponsorship, and increasingly tougher competition make it difficult to maintain the team spirit and the community between the team members.

Problems related to money, violence in sports, and private life are touched upon in this film, in which the hockey environment is presented realistically.

== Background ==
Hockeyfeber is the last of three youth films directed by Oddvar Bull Tuhus in the early 1980s. In 1980 he released 1958, which was about the Sinsen gang, and in 1982 Fifty-Fifty, a film about broken dreams, boring jobs, and dance band success. Tore Torell was engaged as a consultant for the film.

== Reception ==
Aftenposten's Øyvind Thorsen wrote the following: "At first, it is somewhat annoying that the players are amateurs at repartee and expression, and their words are often lost in mumbling, but eventually the film becomes so focused that you forget this. Liv Bernhoft Osa and Jørn Donner also add weight to the film. Donner, as the Finnish coach, is unyielding, strong-willed, and arrogant, but well aware of his capacity, and that those that follow his orders will win." Dagbladet's Thor Ellingsen was more enthusiastic in his review, and wrote the following: "With Hockeyfeber, Tuhus continues the thread from 1958 and Fifty-Fifty, in which he portrayed Norwegian youth cultures and tackles subjects that filmmakers have traditionally neglected in Norway. He has gotten better with each of these films, and I think Hockeybefer is simply the best of his seven feature films to date. The cinematographer Halvor Næss and editor Bjørn Breigutu contribute significantly to the successful result." Jan Simonsen in the film magazine Z was more mixed in his views and wrote the following in 1983: "Young people are affected by a number of diseases these days. We have noted both Saturday Night Fever, Flashdance fever, and several other variations. Now they are also exposed to a Norwegian virus: Hockey fever! Z's reviewer finds it natural to continue the diagnosis tradition from the blessed Filmavisa. He finds the film's theme interesting, but sees weaknesses in the dramaturgy and the representation of the ice hockey game itself."

The film received a "die throw" of 4 from Dagbladet in 1996.

== Cast ==
- Rune Dybedahl as Ricky
- Rolf Søder as Frank Hansen
- Gunhild Grünfeldt as Inger
- Liv Bernhoft Osa as Vesra
- Jörn Donner as Glenn, the coach
- Jørn Goldstein as Svein
- Tom Røymark as Tommy
- Lars Espen Backe as Roffen
- Cato Hamre Andersen as Anders
- Petter Thoresen as Thore
- Sverre Anker Ousdal as Haukland
- Wilfred Breistrand as Mr. Big
- Trond Abrahamsen as Lasse
- Jarl Eriksen as Rosy
- Per Theodor Haugen as Gusnnar
- Roy Jansen as Hansen
- Pia Tellefsen as Britt
- Kjetil Try as Pettern
- Svein Hovde
- Rune Molberg
- Ulf Torgersen
- Eldar Vågan as the parking attendant
- Erik Ask
- Knut Theodor Gleditsch
- Kyrre Mosleth
