= List of Manglerud Star Ishockey seasons =

Manglerud Star Ishockey is a Norwegian ice hockey club based in Oslo. They are members of the highest Norwegian ice hockey league, Eliteserien (known as GET-ligaen for sponsorship reasons). Manglerud Star Ishockey are the ice hockey department of IL Manglerud Star, a sports club founded in 1913. Originally known as Star, the club became known as Manglerud/Star after merging with Manglerud IL in 1964, and eventually Manglerud Star (without the slash). Ice hockey was included as an activity in 1967, and is today one of two sports practised by the club, the other being football. As of 2010, they have completed twenty-nine seasons in the Eliteserien and have won 385 regular season games.

Manglerud Star achieved success in the early years of their existence thanks to a selection of talented young players who, after winning several youth and junior championships, brought the club into the highest division ahead of the 1973–74 season. From then on and until the early 1980s, the club fought regularly for the League Championship, finishing the season as runners-up five times in a row from 1975 to 1979. In the playoffs, they were increasingly successful until finally winning back-to-back Norwegian Championship titles in 1977 and 1978. After losing in the Finals against Vålerengen in 1982, a long period of decline ensued, culminating in relegation to the second level in the 1990–91 season. Having returned to the Eliteserien in 1993, Manglerud Star collaborated with Furuset and a group of investors to form the Spektrum Flyers franchise in 1994. When this effort collapsed after only two seasons, Manglerud Star chose to again compete as a team in their own right.

== Seasons ==
Norwegian Champions	Regular Season Champions	Promoted	Relegated

Season	League	Division	Regular season^{[a]}										Postseason^{[a]}							
Season	League	Division	GP	W	L	T	OTW	OTL	GF	GA	Pts	Finish	GP	W	L	T	GF	GA	Pts	Result
1969–70	3. divisjon	B	10	9	1	0	—	—	46	20	18	1st	5	4	1	0	16	10	8	Won 3. divisjon Championship^{[b]}
1970–71	2. divisjon	A	10	5	2	3	—	—	41	31	13	2nd	6	2	3	1	15	29	5	3rd in Qualifying for 1. divisjon
1971–72	2. divisjon	A					—	—												
1972–73	2. divisjon	A	8	6	1	1	—	—	44	17	13	2nd	10	8	2	0	54	21	16	2nd in Qualifying for 1. divisjon I^{[c]}
1973–74	1. divisjon		18	8	7	3	—	—	55	61	19	5th	10	5	5	0	36	45	10	4th in Norwegian Championship
1974–75	1. divisjon		18	15	3	0	—	—	90	53	30	2nd	10	5	4	1	32	38	11	3rd in Norwegian Championship
1975–76	1. divisjon		18	13	4	1	—	—	102	53	27	2nd	10	5	4	1	46	30	11	3rd in Norwegian Championship
1976–77	1. divisjon		18	13	2	3	—	—	124	43	29	2nd	10	9	1	0	57	27	19	Won Norwegian Championship
1977–78	1. divisjon		18	14	4	0	—	—	116	76	28	2nd	10	7	2	1	52	31	15	Won Norwegian Championship
1978–79	1. divisjon		18	13	5	0	—	—	76	63	26	2nd	10	3	6	1	39	47	7	5th in Norwegian Championship
1979–80	1. divisjon		27	16	8	3	—	—	133	94	35	4th	2	0	2	—	10	15	—	Lost in Quarter-finals, 10–15 (agg) (Vålerengen)
1980–81	1. divisjon		36	18	16	2	—	—	165	148	38	6th	Did not qualify							
1981–82	1. divisjon		36	21	9	6	—	—	224	136	48	3rd	4	1	3	—	17	25	—	Won in Semi-finals, 11–9 (agg) (Furuset); Lost in Finals, 6–16 (agg) (Vålerengen)
1982–83	1. divisjon		36	21	15	0	—	—	193	184	42	6th	Did not qualify							
1983–84	1. divisjon		28	12	11	5	—	—	133	111	29	5th	Did not qualify							
1984–85	1. divisjon		18	9	8	1	—	—	104	90	19	6th	Did not qualify							
1984–85	Mellomspillet^{[d]}		10	4	6	0	—	—	44	61	8	5th	Did not qualify							
1985–86	1. divisjon		36	15	18	3	—	—	158	162	33	7th	Did not qualify							
1986–87	1. divisjon		36	16	18	2	—	—	164	159	34	7th	Did not qualify							
1987–88	1. divisjon		36	11	23	2	—	—	137	184	24	9th	2	2	0	—	18	6	—	Won Qualifying for 1. divisjon, 18–6 (agg) (Lambertseter)
1988–89	1. divisjon		36	11	20	5	—	—	158	183	27	9th	2	1	1	—	14	12	—	Won Qualifying for 1. divisjon, 14–12 (agg) (Lørenskog)
1989–90	1. divisjon		36	11	22	3	—	—	152	172	25	7th	Did not qualify							
1990–91^{[e]}	Eliteserien I^{[f]}		18	3	15	0	—	—	72	179	6	9th								
1990–91^{[e]}	1. divisjon II		14	9	4	1	—	—	95	87	19	3rd								
1991–92	1. divisjon I		18	9	7	2	—	—	88	62	20	5th								
1991–92	1. divisjon II		14	6	6	2	—	—	64	60	14	5th								
1992–93	1. divisjon I		18	14	4	0	—	—	122	56	28	1st								
1992–93	1. divisjon II		14	10	3	1	—	—	89	58	23	2nd								
1993–94	Eliteserien I		18	5	9	4	—	—	63	85	14	8th	Did not qualify							
1993–94	Eliteserien II		14	4	9	1	—	—	46	60	9	7th	Did not qualify							
1994–95	Manglerud Star's place in the Eliteserien was used by the Spektrum Flyers																			
1995–96	Manglerud Star's place in the Eliteserien was used by the Spektrum Flyers																			
1996–97	Eliteserien		36	13	21	2	—	—	127	179	28	7th	3	0	3	—	6	20	—	Lost in Quarter-finals, 0–3 (Vålerenga)
1997–98	Eliteserien		44	18	23	3	—	—	172	179	39	7th	Did not qualify							
1998–99	Eliteserien		44	15	24	5	—	—	140	159	35	8th	Did not qualify							
1999–2000	Eliteserien		38	12	25	1	—	—	105	155	25	7th	Did not qualify							
2000–01	Eliteserien		42	20	18	4	—	—	123	116	44	5th	Did not qualify							
2001–02	Eliteserien		42	14	20	8	—	—	112	134	36	7th	Did not qualify							
2002–03^{[g]}	Eliteserien		38	12	19	—	2	5	127	141	45	7th	Did not qualify							
2003–04	Eliteserien		42	4	37	—	0	1	80	235	13	10th	6	3	3	—	26	19	11	3rd in Qualifying for Eliteserien
2004–05	1. divisjon		32	27	3	2	—	—	192	60	56	2nd	6	3	3	—	13	16	9	2nd in Qualifying for Eliteserien
2005–06	Eliteserien		42	5	34	—	2	1	105	226	20	10th	6	3	3	—	25	17	9	3rd in Qualifying for Eliteserien
2006–07	1. divisjon		30	22	5	3	—	—	192	59	47	3rd	6	1	5	–	12	17	4	4th in Qualifying for Eliteserien
2007–08	1. divisjon		30	10	17	3	—	—	123	149	23	11th	Did not qualify							
2008–09	1. divisjon		30	26	3	1	—	—	217	52	53	2nd	6	4	2	—	33	19	12	2nd in Qualifying for Eliteserien
2009–10	Eliteserien		48	16	24	—	3	5	133	154	59	7th	5	1	4	—	14	19	—	Lost in Quarter-finals, 1–4 (Vålerenga)
Eliteserien totals^{[h]}			935	378	471	67	7	12	3,689	3,974	886		74	36	34	4	309	297	73	10 playoff appearances

== Notes ==
- ^{a} Code explanation; GP—Games Played, W—Wins, L—Losses, T—Tied games, OTW—Overtime/Shootout wins, OTL—Overtime/Shootout losses, GF—Goals For, GA—Goals Against, Pts—Points
- ^{b} Manglerud Star tied first with Skiold after four games, winning the replay 6–5 to claim the 3. divisjon Championship title and win promotion to the 2. divisjon.
- ^{c} In the 1972–73 season, an elaborate system of qualifying rounds was used to expand the number of teams in the 1. divisjon from eight to ten. Manglerud Star placed second in the first round for 2. divisjon teams and were thus promoted to the 1. divisjon without further competition.
- ^{d} Mellomspillet was a one-time continuation league contested in 1984–85 between the six highest ranked teams in the 1. divisjon. Of these six teams, the top four qualified for the semi-finals of the Norwegian Championship.
- ^{e} Before the 1990–91 season, the 1. divisjon was renamed Eliteserien. Correspondingly, the 2. divisjon (second tier) was renamed 1. divisjon, the 3. divisjon (third tier) was renamed 2. divisjon etc.
- ^{f} Between the 1990–91 season and the 1993–94 season, the Eliteserien was divided into two parts. After the first 18 games, the top eight teams qualified for the second half of the Eliteserien. The bottom two teams were relegated to the 1. divisjon and would compete for the right to play in the Eliteserien in the following season. In 1990–91, the results of both rounds were added up to produce one league champion; in the three following seasons, there were two champions per season.
- ^{g} Beginning with the 2002–03 season, all games in the Eliteserien have a winner. In addition, teams now receive three points for a win in regulation time, two points for a win in overtime and one point for a loss in overtime.
- ^{h} Totals as of the completion of the 2009–10 season.
