= Mats Trygg =

Norwegian ice hockey player

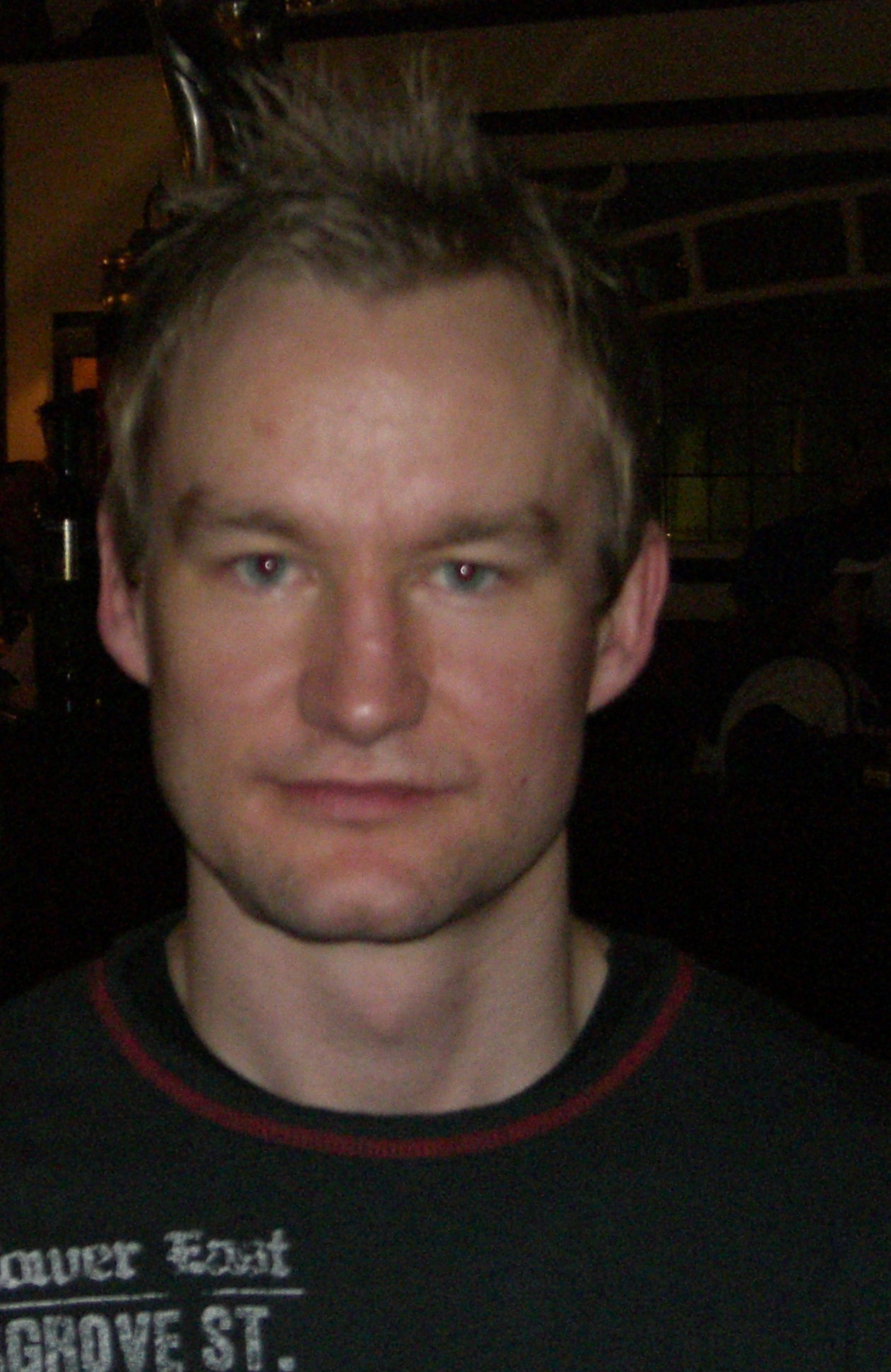
- Born: June 1, 1976 (age 49) Oslo, Norway
- Height: 5 ft 10 in (178 cm)
- Weight: 187 lb (85 kg; 13 st 5 lb)
- Position: Defence
- Shoots: Right
- GET team Former teams: Vålerenga Ishockey; Spektrum Flyers; Manglerud Star; Färjestad; Iserlohn Roosters; Kölner Haie; Hamburg Freezers; HV71; Lørenskog IK
- National team: Norway
- NHL draft: Undrafted
- Playing career: 1994–present

Mats Trygg (born June 1, 1976) is a Norwegian ice hockey defenceman. He currently plays with the Vålerenga Ishockey of the Norwegian GET-ligaen.

== Playing career ==
He started his senior career with Spektrum Flyers in 1994 and played two seasons before signing with Manglerud Star in 1996. He stayed there for three seasons.

In 1999 he signed with the Swedish Elitserien club Färjestad and won the Swedish Championship with them in 2002. He played there for six seasons, before moving to Germany and the Deutsche Eishockey Liga.

In 2005, he joined his best friend and fellow national team player, Martin Knold, playing for Iserlohn Roosters. He stayed only a single season with the Roosters, before getting signed by Kölner Haie in the same league. After four seasons in Cologne, he moved to Hamburg and the Freezers in 2010.

On January 7, 2014, Trygg was named to Team Norway's official 2014 Winter Olympics roster. During the third period of the game against Canada on February 13, he was injured. While hobbling off the ice, he was struck by a referee who was skating backwards and knocked to the ice, sliding to the boards.

== Personal life ==
His twin brother, Marius Trygg, also plays ice hockey, as well as their younger brother Mathias.

== Career statistics ==
=== Regular season and playoffs ===
			Regular season					Playoffs
Season	Team	League	GP	G	A	Pts	PIM	GP	G	A	Pts	PIM
1994–95	Spektrum Flyers	NOR	26	3	1	4	8	—	—	—	—	—
1995–96	Spektrum Flyers	NOR	31	2	4	6	16	—	—	—	—	—
1996–97	Manglerud Star	NOR	36	13	11	24	12	—	—	—	—	—
1997–98	Manglerud Star	NOR	37	14	9	23	35	—	—	—	—	—
1998–99	Manglerud Star	NOR	44	14	22	36	14	—	—	—	—	—
1999–2000	Färjestad BK	SEL	29	0	9	9	8	3	0	1	1	0
2000–01	Färjestad BK	SEL	50	10	10	20	22	15	4	5	9	16
2001–02	Färjestad BK	SEL	40	9	10	19	22	10	4	4	8	39
2002–03	Färjestad BK	SEL	50	5	13	18	54	14	0	2	2	10
2003–04	Färjestad BK	SEL	49	13	6	19	30	17	0	0	0	20
2004–05	Färjestad BK	SEL	49	5	3	8	38	15	1	1	2	10
2005–06	Iserlohn Roosters	DEL	52	13	20	33	82	—	—	—	—	—
2006–07	Kölner Haie	DEL	52	7	22	29	60	9	1	2	3	30
2007–08	Kölner Haie	DEL	46	7	20	27	50	14	3	5	8	14
2008–09	Kölner Haie	DEL	51	5	19	24	36	—	—	—	—	—
2009–10	Kölner Haie	DEL	39	7	10	17	42	3	1	1	2	4
2010–11	Hamburg Freezers	DEL	50	2	8	10	66	—	—	—	—	—
2011–12	HV71	SEL	21	2	1	3	18	6	0	1	1	2
2012–13	HV71	SEL	52	3	1	4	28	5	2	2	4	2
2013–14	Lørenskog IK	NOR	38	7	22	29	38	5	0	1	1	4
2014–15	Lørenskog IK	NOR	40	5	24	29	53	6	1	1	2	4
2015–16	Lørenskog IK	NOR	44	3	16	19	20	17	4	6	10	12
2016–17	Lørenskog IK	NOR	37	7	19	26	18	7	1	3	4	2
2017–18	Lørenskog IK	NOR	42	7	16	23	28	4	0	0	0	4
2018–19	Vålerenga Ishockey	NOR	41	8	12	20	34	11	1	6	7	8
2019–20	Vålerenga Ishockey	NOR	37	3	13	16	20	—	—	—	—	—
2020–21	Manglerud Star	NOR	21	1	13	14	8	—	—	—	—	—
2021–22	Manglerud Star	NOR	14	1	4	5	4	—	—	—	—	—
NOR totals			488	88	186	274	308	50	7	17	24	34
SEL totals			340	47	53	100	220	85	11	16	27	99
DEL totals			290	41	99	140	336	26	5	8	13	48

=== International ===
Year	Team	Event	GP	G	A	Pts	PIM
1994	Norway	WJC B	7	0	0	0	2
1994	Norway	EJC	5	1	3	4	4
1995	Norway	WJC B	7	1	0	1	2
1997	Norway	WC	8	1	0	1	2
1998	Norway	WC B	7	0	2	2	2
2000	Norway	WC	5	1	1	2	2
2000	Norway	WC	6	1	4	5	6
2001	Norway	OGQ	3	2	0	2	0
2001	Norway	WC	5	0	2	2	0
2002	Norway	WC D1	4	0	4	4	2
2003	Norway	WC D1	5	0	2	2	18
2004	Norway	WC D1	5	1	5	6	2
2005	Norway	OGQ	6	6	2	8	2
2005	Norway	WC D1	5	1	5	6	4
2006	Norway	WC	5	1	2	3	12
2007	Norway	WC	6	2	5	7	8
2008	Norway	WC	7	1	4	5	8
2009	Norway	OGQ	3	0	2	2	4
2009	Norway	WC	6	1	0	1	6
2010	Norway	OG	4	0	0	0	2
2012	Norway	WC	8	5	1	6	14
2013	Norway	WC	7	1	2	3	2
2014	Norway	OG	3	0	0	0	0
2014	Norway	WC	7	2	0	2	8
2015	Norway	WC	7	0	0	0	4
2016	Norway	WC	7	0	1	1	10
Junior totals			19	2	3	5	8
Senior totals			129	26	44	70	118
