= Eldar Vågan =

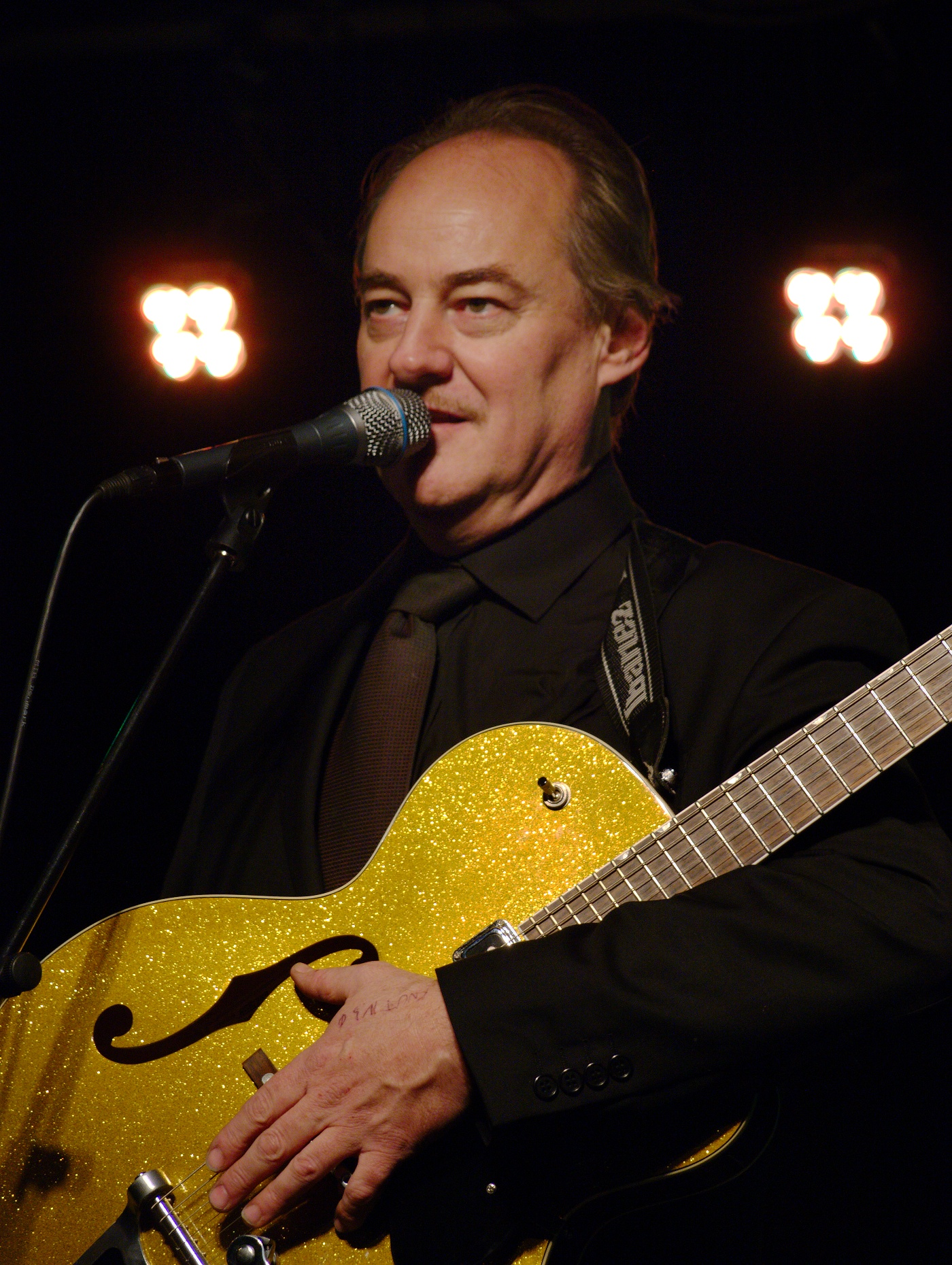
- Eldar Vågan at Norsk Rakfiskfestival in 2010

Background information
- Born: August 30, 1960 (age 65); Kapp, Norway
- Occupation: Musician
- Instruments: Guitar, vocal, cello
- Years active: 1979–present
- Labels: Universal Music Group
- Website: www.eldarvagan.no

Eldar Vågan (born 30 August 1960) is best known as the songwriter and guitarist in Vazelina Bilopphøggers. Previously he was a guitarist in the rock band Baiage. Vågan has also developed his own solo musical career as well as being a published illustrator and acting in many Norwegian films and television productions.

== Bands ==
Eldar Vågan and Bjørn Berg (vocalist on the first Vazelina-LP) were both in the band Baiage before Vazelina were formed. The 1979 lineup of Baiage was: Henning Hoel (guitar), Hallgeir Brumoen (singer), Eldar Vågan (guitar), Bjørnulf Dyrud (drummer), Jan Erik Dammerud (piano) and Bjørn Berg (bass). The band released one EP in 1979 entitled Baiage x 4 as it included four tracks by the band. Baiage also took part in the National Battle of the Bands in 1979 and their song "På do" was included in the compilation album NM for rockeband LIVE.

Eldar Vågan has been the guitarist in Vazelina Bilopphøggers since they started in 1979.

He is also vocalist and guitarist in his own band called Eldar Vågan and The Eldarados.

== Discography ==
=== Solo ===
Albums

- Trøbbel (1982)
- En herre med bart (1985)
- Leva livet som Eldar i en Elvis film (2012)

Singles

- K.F.U.M./Je angrer meg (1982)
- Alt je har å si/K.F.U.M. (1982)
- Je har itte bruk for giftering/Bigamist i kveld (1985)
- Smørja ski/Ligningssjefen (1985)
- Sugemerke (2011)

Appearances on other artist records

- Tre Busserulls Piker, vin og 3 Busserulls (1985) (guest on the track "NM i HB")
- Steinar Ofsdal Reisefeber (1985) (vocals on Sang er pent)
- Tre Busserulls Å då lo e.g. (1987) (collaboration)
- Øystein Sunde Nå er begeret nådd (1999) (choir on "Snøfreser'n")
- Eda-Pelle Vita Äljen (2000) (producer, guitars, choir, organ, and editing)
- Jahn Teigen Utkledd som meg selv (2003) (on the title track)
- Maj Britt Andersen Dørstokken heme (2004) (vocals on "Mari du bedåre")

=== as part of Baiage ===
- Baiage x 4 (1979)

=== as part of Vazelina Bilopphøggers ===
- 24 timers service (1980)
- Slitin i knea (1981)
- Blå lys (1982)
- På tur (1983)
- Fem fyrer med ved (1984)
- Fem års jubileum (1985)
- Musikk tel arbe' (1986)
- Gå for gull! (1987)
- Tempo (1989)
- Full behandling (1990)
- 11 år uten kvinnfolk (1992)
- Rock a Doodle (1994)
- Gammel Oppland (1994)
- Hææærli' på toppen ta væla (1996)
- Hjulkalender (2000)
- Bedre hell' all medisin! (2005)
- Bensin På Bålet (2007)

== Filmography ==
- 1982 - 50/50
- 1982 - Krypskyttere
- 1983 - Hockeyfeber
- 1988 - Showbiz

=== Film soundtracks ===
- Fifty Fifty 50/50 - soundtrack (1982) (Du trur du kæin å spelle / Såre baller)
- Vidar Sandbeck i ord og toner: Gull ifra grønne skoger (2003) (Bildilla)

== TV series ==
- 1994 - Seier'n er vår
- 1994 - Brødrene Dal og legenden om Atlant-Is
- 1998 - Karl & Co

Zebra Grand Prix

In summer 2009, Eldar went out in the semifinal of TV 2's program Zebra Grand Prix.

== Illustrations ==
Eldar Vågan has illustrated the following books:

- Øystein Sunde. Kjekt å ha - 1. Ex Libris forlag, 1990.
- Øystein Sunde. Kjekkere å ha - 2. Ex Libris forlag, 1992.
- Hans Rotmo. Tekstforfattaren: handbok for skriving av songtekstar. Samlaget, 1993.
- Arne Moslåtten. Stev på hjernen. Samlaget, 1996.
- Øystein Sunde. Du må'kke komme her og komme her. Ex Libris forlag, 1997.
- Hanssen, Halvard C. Gift med Lullen. Ex Libris forlag, 1998.
- Birger Sivertsen. Er de norske fjordene åpne om natten?. Frifant forlag, 1998.
- Øystein Sunde. Sånn er'e bare. Blåmann, 2006.
- Odd Nordhaug. Eksamensperler. Forlag1, 2008
- Hans-Ivar Kristiansen. Talerens Bok. Forlag1, 2009
