= Sonny Karlsson (ice hockey) =

Swedish ice hockey player

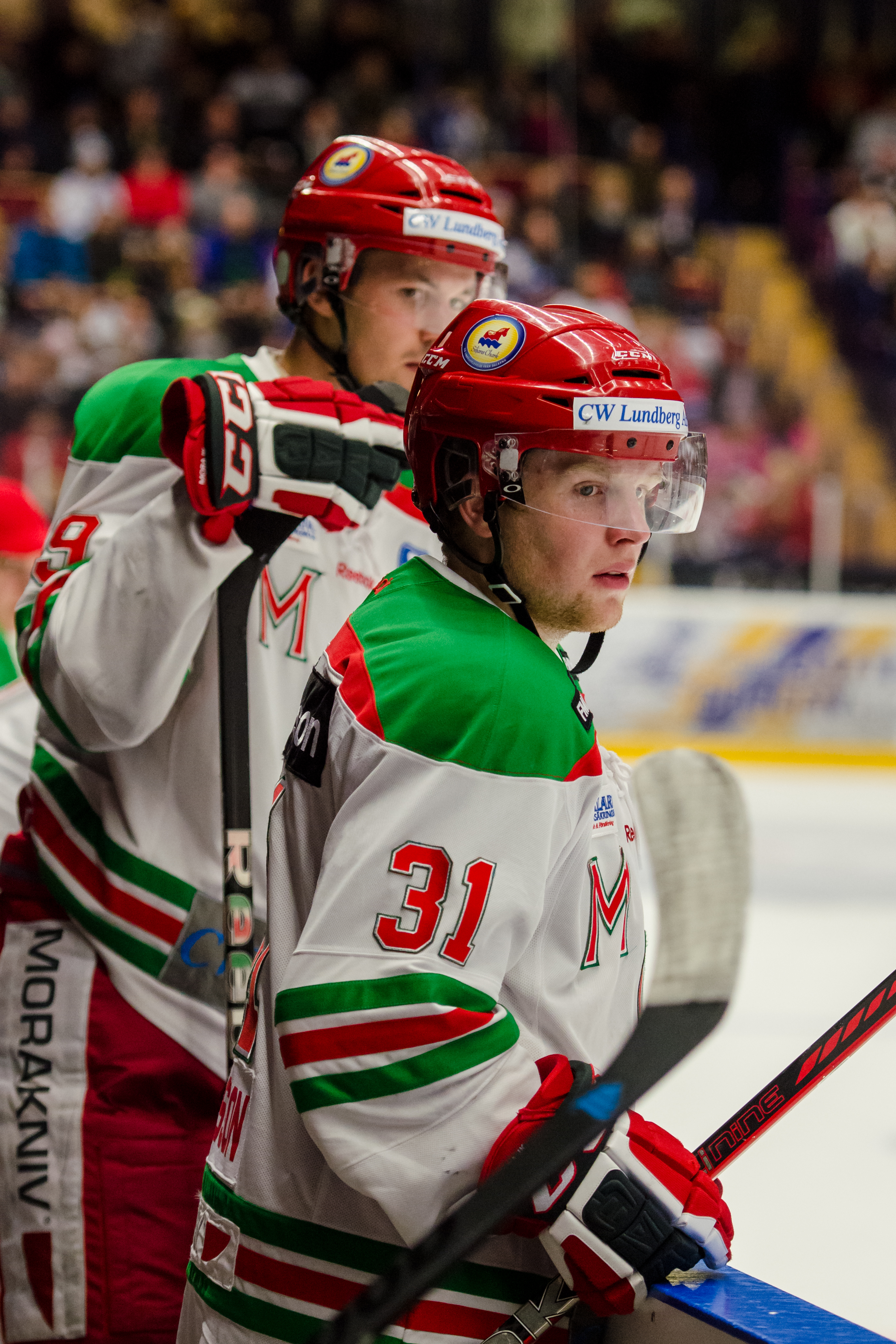
- Born: March 14, 1993 (age 32) Älvdalen, Sweden
- Height: 5 ft 9 in (175 cm)
- Weight: 170 lb (77 kg; 12 st 2 lb)
- Position: Left wing
- Shoots: Left
- Magnus team Former teams: Diables Rouges de Briançon; Mora IK; Manglerud Star
- Playing career: 2011–present

Sonny Karlsson (born March 14, 1993) is a Swedish professional ice hockey centre, currently playing for Diables Rouges de Briançon in the Ligue Magnus. He previously played the majority of the professional career with Mora IK of the HockeyAllsvenskan, the second highest-level league in Sweden.

== Career statistics ==
			Regular season					Playoffs
Season	Team	League	GP	G	A	Pts	PIM	GP	G	A	Pts	PIM
2009–10	Mora IK	J20	10	0	1	1	0	—	—	—	—	—
2010–11	Mora IK	J20	38	6	14	20	24	5	2	0	2	0
2011–12	Mora IK	J20	42	9	17	26	55	—	—	—	—	—
2011–12	Mora IK	Allsv	4	0	0	0	0	—	—	—	—	—
2011–12	IFK Ore	Div.1	4	2	2	4	4	—	—	—	—	—
2012–13	Mora IK	J20	16	9	10	19	12	—	—	—	—	—
2012–13	Mora IK	Allsv	34	3	5	8	20	—	—	—	—	—
2013–14	Mora IK	J20	10	1	6	7	8	—	—	—	—	—
2013–14	Mora IK	Allsv	47	9	6	15	14	—	—	—	—	—
2014–15	Mora IK	J20	4	3	4	7	0	—	—	—	—	—
2014–15	Mora IK	Allsv	24	1	0	1	2	—	—	—	—	—
2014–15	Hudiksvalls HC	Div.1	8	5	2	7	33	4	1	2	3	2
2014–15	Manglerud Star	GET	4	0	0	0	2	—	—	—	—	—
Allsv totals			109	13	11	24	36	—	—	—	—	—
