= Knut Walbye =

Norwegian ice hockey player

- Born: January 9, 1968 (age 58) Oslo, Norway
- Height: 6 ft 0 in (183 cm)
- Weight: 198 lb (90 kg; 14 st 2 lb)
- Position: Forward
- Played for: Furuset; Manglerud Star; Spektrum Flyers
- National team: Norway
- NHL draft: 139th overall, 1987; New York Islanders
- Playing career: 1986–1999

Knut Walbye (born 9 January 1968 in Oslo) is a Norwegian former professional ice hockey player.

Walbye was drafted by the New York Islanders in the 7th round (139th overall) in the 1987 NHL entry draft but never played in the NHL. He played in Norway for Furuset, Manglerud Star and the now-defunct Spektrum Flyers.

Walbye played in the 1990 and 1992 IIHF World Championships for the Norway national team.
