= Kjetil Try =

Norwegian advertising executive (born 1959)

- Born: Kjetil Dyrendahl Try; 24 July 1959 (age 67)
- Occupations: Advertising agency executive and crime fiction writer
- Spouse: Ingunn Yssen (m. 1982–1999)

Kjetil Dyrendahl Try (born 24 July 1959) is a Norwegian advertising agency executive and crime fiction writer.

== Personal life ==
Try grew up at Manglerud in Oslo. He has played ice hockey for the club Manglerud Star, and participated in the 1983 film Hockeyfeber, where he played the character "Pettern". He was married to Ingunn Yssen from 1982 until they divorced seventeen years later.

== Career ==
Try made his literary debut in 1997 with the crime fiction novel Stø kurs. Later novels are Pavlovs hunder (2002), La de små barn komme til meg (2008), and Frels oss fra det onde (2011).

Try is known as a close friend to Labour Party politician and former prime minister Jens Stoltenberg; they graduated together from Oslo Cathedral School in 1978. Starting from 1989, Try has been involved in designing many election campaigns for the Norwegian Labour Party. In his autobiography from 2016, Stoltenberg revealed that Try had advised him on several occasions.

Try won a Cannes Golden Lion in 1990 for a film commercial for "Polly" potato chips.
