= Knut Theodor Gleditsch =

Norwegian sportscaster and journalist (1938–2001)

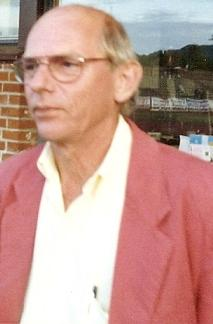
- Born: July 3, 1938
- Died: February 13, 2001 (aged 62); Bærum, Norway
- Occupation: Sportscaster

Knut Theodor "Gle" Gleditsch (July 3, 1938 – February 13, 2001) was a Norwegian sportscaster from Sande, Vestfold.

== Life ==
After spending some time at sea and studying as a business economist from the BI Norwegian Business School, he became a journalist for Sportsmanden in 1962. He started reporting for Morgenbladet in 1964, before moving to NRK Television in 1966. There he was a commentator on soccer and alpine skiing. He also covered a number of cup finals, international matches, and 4 o'clock Saturday matches broadcast as Tippekampen, as well as seven World Cup finals for the national channel.

Gleditsch left NRK in 1991 and started working for TV3, where for many years he commented on the UEFA Champions League, including Rosenborg's famous victory over AC Milan in 1996 and Ole Gunnar Solskjær's winning goal for Manchester United in 1999. He also commented on certain matches in the 1998 FIFA World Cup as part of "Team Gleditsch," where his sons Pål and Espen Gleditsch were reporters and photographers, and his daughter Kine was a journalist for Det Nye. As a sportscaster, he combined professional strength with humor and cheer.

Gleditsch died of cancer at the age of 62 in Bærum. Gleditsch was the great-grandnephew of Bishop Jens Gran Gleditsch.

== Discography ==
- 1974: Jonas Fjeld Bing Bang Band: Pans Fløyte
- 1981: Vazelina Bilopphøggers: Slitin i knea
- 1987: Totenschlager: Stjernehits
- 1990: Totenschlager: Jørgen Engum A/S
- 1992: Geithus Idrettslag: Geithus I.L. – 100 år for idretten

== Filmography ==
- 1983: Hockeyfeber
