= Serge Boisvert =

Canadian ice hockey player

- Born: June 1, 1959 (age 66) Drummondville, Quebec, Canada
- Height: 5 ft 9 in (175 cm)
- Weight: 187 lb (85 kg; 13 st 5 lb)
- Position: Right wing
- Shot: Right
- Played for: Toronto Maple Leafs; Montreal Canadiens; HC Davos; Västra Frölunda; Spektrum Flyers; Frisk Tigers; Vålerenga
- National team: Canada
- NHL draft: Undrafted
- Playing career: 1979–1999

Pierre Serge Boisvert (born June 1, 1959) is a Canadian former professional ice hockey player. In North America, he won the Calder Cup in 1985. He also played in the National Hockey League (NHL) for the Toronto Maple Leafs and Montreal Canadiens, winning the Stanley Cup with the latter in 1986.

Following his North American career, Boisvert played in Sweden for Västra Frölunda, and in Norway for Frisk Tigers, Spektrum Flyers and Vålerenga. In 2002 Boisvert coached Frisk Tigers to the Norwegian championship.

== Post career ==
Since 2010, Boisvert has been an amateur scout with the Montreal Canadiens of the NHL.

== Career statistics ==
=== Regular season and playoffs ===
			Regular season					Playoffs
Season	Team	League	GP	G	A	Pts	PIM	GP	G	A	Pts	PIM
1977–78	Sherbrooke Castors	QMJHL	55	17	33	50	19	10	2	2	4	2
1978–79	Sherbrooke Castors	QMJHL	72	50	72	122	45	12	11	17	28	2
1979–80	Sherbrooke Castors	QMJHL	69	55	72	127	47	15	14	18	32	4
1979–80	New Brunswick Hawks	AHL	—	—	—	—	—	7	4	0	4	4
1980–81	New Brunswick Hawks	AHL	60	19	27	46	31	5	0	0	0	2
1981–82	Sapporo Polaris	JPN	30	29	20	49		—	—	—	—	—
1982–83	Toronto Maple Leafs	NHL	17	0	2	2	4	—	—	—	—	—
1982–83	St. Catharines Saints	AHL	19	10	9	19	2	—	—	—	—	—
1982–83	Moncton Alpines	AHL	29	6	12	18	7	—	—	—	—	—
1983–84	Moncton Alpines	AHL	66	15	13	28	34	—	—	—	—	—
1984–85	Montreal Canadiens	NHL	14	2	2	4	0	12	3	5	8	2
1984–85	Sherbrooke Canadiens	AHL	63	38	41	79	8	10	1	9	10	12
1985–86	Montreal Canadiens	NHL	9	2	2	4	2	8	0	1	1	0
1985–86	Sherbrooke Canadiens	AHL	69	40	48	88	18	—	—	—	—	—
1986–87	Montreal Canadiens	NHL	1	0	0	0	0	—	—	—	—	—
1986–87	Sherbrooke Canadiens	AHL	78	27	54	81	29	15	8	10	18	15
1987–88	Canadian National Team	Intl	71	29	28	57	36	—	—	—	—	—
1987–88	Montreal Canadiens	NHL	5	1	1	2	2	3	0	1	1	2
1988–89	HC Davos	NDA	35	20	17	37	26	—	—	—	—	—
1989–90	Västra Frölunda HC	SEL	39	18	14	32	24	—	—	—	—	—
1989–90	Canada	Intl	5	1	0	1	0	—	—	—	—	—
1990–91	Västra Frölunda HC	SEL	22	4	4	8	10	—	—	—	—	—
1990–91	Västra Frölunda HC	Allsv	17	6	2	8	4	10	4	6	10	8
1991–92	Västra Frölunda HC	SEL	40	12	16	28	30	3	0	1	1	2
1992–93	Västra Frölunda HC	SEL	20	6	6	12	44	—	—	—	—	—
1992–93	Västra Frölunda HC	Allsv	16	14	15	29	8	3	2	1	3	0
1992–93	Canada	Intl	3	3	1	4	0	—	—	—	—	—
1993–94	Västra Frölunda HC	SEL	36	6	9	15	26	4	1	1	2	0
1994–95	Vålerenga Ishockey	NOR	27	15	17	32	24	2	1	1	2	0
1994–95	Canada	Intl	2	0	0	0	2	—	—	—	—	—
1995–96	Vålerenga Ishockey	NOR	28	23	21	44		4	2	2	4
1996–97	Vålerenga Ishockey	NOR	42	26	25	51	32	9	5	5	10
1997–98	Vålerenga Ishockey	NOR	40	21	24	45	51	—	—	—	—	—
1998–99	Vålerenga Ishockey	NOR	6	2	4	6	4	—	—	—	—	—
AHL totals			384	155	204	359	129	37	13	19	32	33
NHL totals			46	5	7	12	8	23	3	7	10	4

=== International ===
Year	Team	Event	GP	G	A	Pts	PIM
1988	Canada	OLY	8	7	2	9	2
Senior totals			8	7	2	9	2
