= Krypskyttere =

- Directed by: Hans Otto Nicolayssen
- Written by: Hans Otto Nicolayssen
- Starring: Jon Eivind Gullord; Hans Rotmo; Per Gørvell; Nils Gaup
- Cinematography: Halvor Næss
- Edited by: Bjørn Breigutu
- Music by: Jo Tore Bæverfjord; Hans Rotmo
- Distributed by: Norsk Film AS
- Release date: August 27, 1982
- Running time: 79 minutes
- Country: Norway
- Language: Norwegian

Krypskyttere (Poachers) is a Norwegian drama film from 1982 directed by Hans Otto Nicolayssen. the film deals with a conflict between the military and the civilian population over the rights to a military firing range. The Cold War is the backdrop for the story. The main roles are played by Jon Eivind Gullord, Hans Rotmo, Per Gørvell and Nils Gaup. The film is in black and white.

== Plot ==
Martin, who is doing his military service, is sent out for shooting practice with his squad in his own hometown. Disputes between the locals and the military over the use of a firing range create loyalty conflicts for Martin. The villagers, led by Martin's father, disagree with the military about the right to use the area. International politics also comes into play when the US military wants to deploy missile silos for nuclear weapons in the forest.

== Reception ==
The newspapers Verdens Gang and Dagbladet gave the film a "die throw" of three out of six.

== Cast ==
- Jon Eivind Gullord as Martin Buer, a soldier
- Hans Rotmo as Bent Tangen, a soldier
- Per Gørvell as Alf Sørensen, a soldier
- Nils Gaup as Kåre, a soldier
- Kim Kalsås as Toni, a soldier
- Jo Tore Bæverfjord as Jo-Tore, a soldier
- Karl Sundby as Knut Lie, a soldier
- Hans Jacob Sand as Knut's friend
- Svein Roger Karlsen as Knut's friend
- Lasse Kolsrud as Tom, a soldier
- Kjell Stormoen as Lieutenant Colonel Strand
- Bjarne Hjelde as Lieutenant Solberg
- Erik Hivju as Berg, a sergeant
- Knut Haugmark as Halvorsen, a lieutenant
- Janken Varden as Hagen, a major
- Bob Sherman as Streufert, a major
- Hayes Burnett as Lieutenant Jones
- Eldar Vågan as Johan Lunden
- Ivar Aaserud as a photographer
- Nina Benan as Lise
- Roy Bjørnstad as Olaf Buer
- Jens Bolling as Arthur Skjolden
- Jappa Calmeyer as Kurre
- Erling Engh as a soldier
- Odd Furøy as Torp, the sheriff
- Anne Mette Grønland as Lise
- David A. Grønli as Karl Holt
- Eli Anne Linnestad as the journalist
- Hans Kr. Medlien as Åmund Gardslie
- Hans Kristian Østbye as a soldier
- Karen Randers-Pehrson as Gudrun
- Espen Skjønberg as Tandberg
- Håkon Sparre as Tore
- Unni Torgersen as Turid
