= 1958 (disambiguation) =

1958 is a year. 1958 may also refer to:

- 1958 (album) by Soul-Junk 2003
- 1958 Miles, album by Miles Davis 1958
- 1958, album by John Coltrane 1993
- "1958", song by the New Jordal Swingers Norway 1980
- "1958" (A Day to Remember song), 2005
- 1958 (film), a 1980 Norwegian drama film directed by Oddvar Bull Tuhus
