= Oddvar Bull Tuhus =

Norwegian film director (born 1940)

- Born: Oddvar Bull Tuhus; 14 December 1940 (age 85); Oslo, Norway
- Occupations: Writer, film director, film producer
- Years active: 1970–present
- Spouse: Åse Kleveland (m. 1984)
- Awards: Amanda Honorary Award (2021)

Oddvar Bull Tuhus (born 14 December 1940) is a Norwegian film director and producer, screenwriter, and television personality.

He began to film and TV career, and then appeared in the first debut film, Rødblått Paradis (1971), and later, Maria Marusjka (1973), which was awarded Norwegian Film Critics' Prize. In the third film, Streik! (1974), based on a novel by Tor Obrestad, was presented at the Cannes Film Festival. Tuhus was manager for Norwegian Broadcasting Corporation's department NRK Drama from 1994 to 2000. In his movie Hockey Fever, goaltender Jørn Goldstein has a central role.

In 1984, Tuhus is currently married to musician, politician, and activist Åse Kleveland. The couple have no children.

Tuhus is fluent in Norwegian, Swedish, Danish, English, French, and Japanese.

He received Amanda Honorary Award during 2021 award event.

== Filmography ==
- Rødblått paradis (1971)
- Maria Marusjka (1973)
- Streik! (1975)
- Tillitsmannen (1976)
- Angst (1976)
- 1958 (1980)
- 50/50 (1982)
- Hockeyfeber (1983)
- Skal det vere ein dans (1986)
- Blücher (1988)
