= Geir Hoff =

Norwegian ice hockey player

- Born: 14 February 1965 (age 61) Bergen, Norway
- Height: 6 ft 0 in (183 cm)
- Weight: 180 lb (82 kg; 12 st 12 lb)
- Position: Left wing
- Shot: Left
- Played for: Vålerenga Ishockey; Furuset Ishockey; Lillehammer IK; Spektrum Flyers
- National team: Norway
- Playing career: 1984–1999

Geir Hoff (born 14 February 1965) is a Norwegian former professional ice hockey player. A three times Olympian, he won five national titles with his clubs, and was awarded Gullpucken in 1991.

== Life and career ==
Born in Bergen on 14 February 1965, Hoff began his career in Sweden with Västra Frölunda before spending two seasons at Michigan State University. Hoff then played in the Norwegian Elitserien for Vålerenga Ishockey, Furuset Ishockey, Lillehammer IK and the Spektrum Flyers between 1987 and 1995 before returning to Vålerenga for a second spell, eventually retiring in 1999.

He was also a member of the Norwegian national ice hockey team, and participated at the Winter Olympics in 1988, 1992, and 1994. He was Norwegian champion in 1988, 1990, 1994, 1998, and 1999, and was awarded Gullpucken as best Norwegian ice hockey player in 1991.
