= Oslo Cathedral School =

- Coat of arms

Location
- Oslo; Norway; 59°55′16″N 10°44′29″E

Information
- Type: Upper secondary school
- Established: 1153; 873 years ago
- Head of school: Patrick Thomas Stark
- Grades: VG1 - VG3

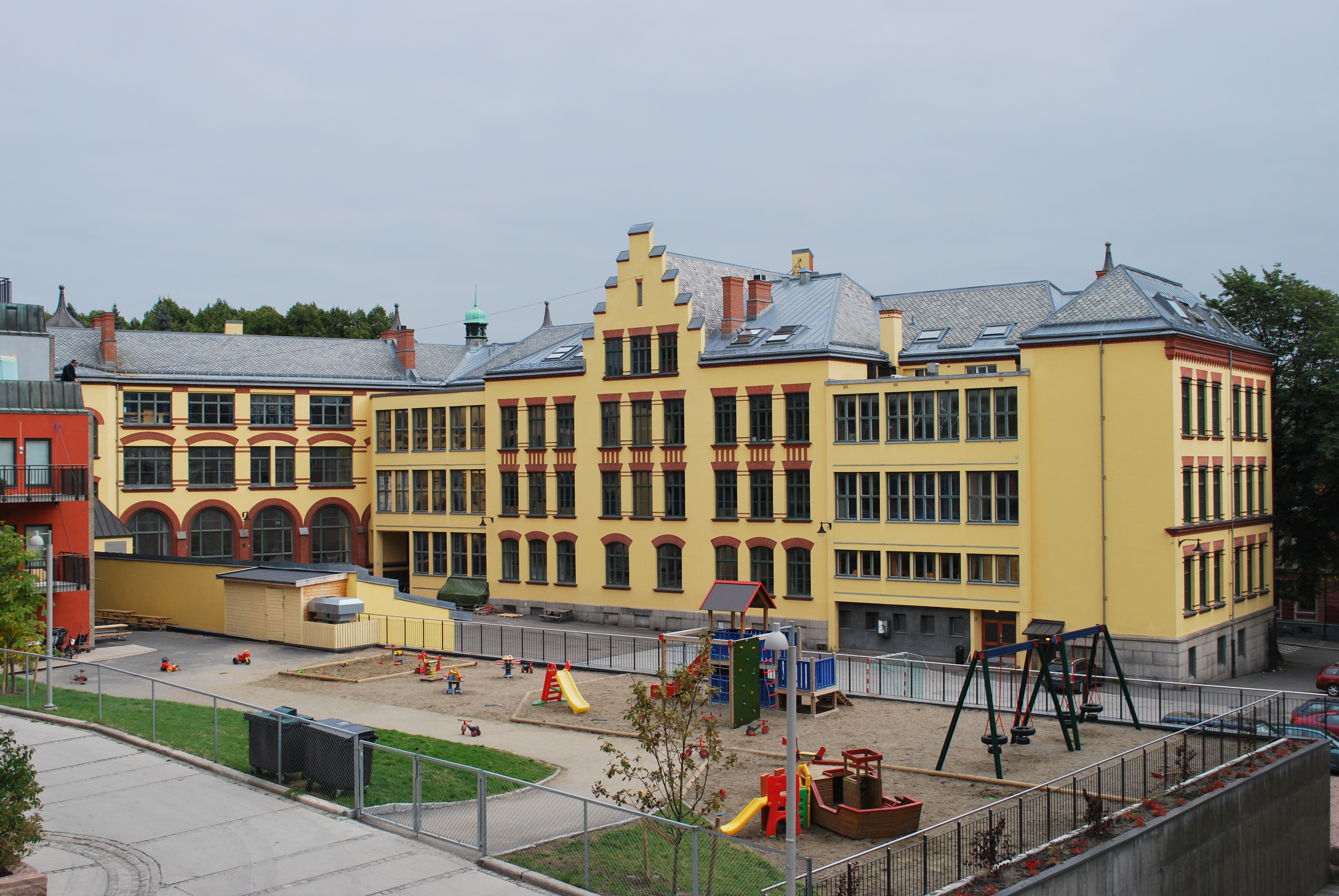
Current building of the Oslo Cathedral School

Schola Osloensis, known in Norwegian as Oslo Katedralskole (Oslo Cathedral School) and more commonly as "Katta", is a selective upper secondary school located in Oslo, Norway.

The school offers the college preparatory Studiespesialisering (literal translation: specialization for studies) of the Norwegian school system. It is one of four schools in Norway that can trace its origins directly to the Middle Ages.

The school's motto is the Latin phrase Non scholae, sed vitae discimus which translates to "We do not learn for the sake of the school, but for the sake of life".

== History ==
According to tradition, the school was founded in 1153 by papal delegate Cardinal Nicholas Breakspeare and administered by the Cathedral of Saint Hallvard. From its foundation until the 18th century, the school was used primarily to educate priests. Thus, the school's teaching traditions were those of the Roman Catholic Church. As with most of Europe at the time, lessons were based on an educational curriculum known as the Liberal Arts. This curriculum consisted of seven different subjects the students were required to learn, and was organized in two groups: Trivium and Quadrivium. The Trivium (Latin for three ways), taught first, comprised grammar, logic, and rhetoric. After Trivium followed the Quadrivium (Latin for four ways): geometry, arithmetic, music, and astronomy. The language used was Latin and remained so until the 18th century. Unlike most other Norwegian state schools, Latin is still taught at the school today.

The 17th century is known in the school's history as "Det lærde århundre" (literal translation: the learned century) because some of the school's teachers were among the most educated scholars in Norway at the time. After a great fire destroyed much of Oslo in 1624, the city was relocated and reconstructed, forcing the school to change its location. After a new gymnasium was opened in Christiania (Oslo's name until 1878), students were offered lessons in extracurricular subjects, including astronomy, philosophy, physics, and metaphysics.

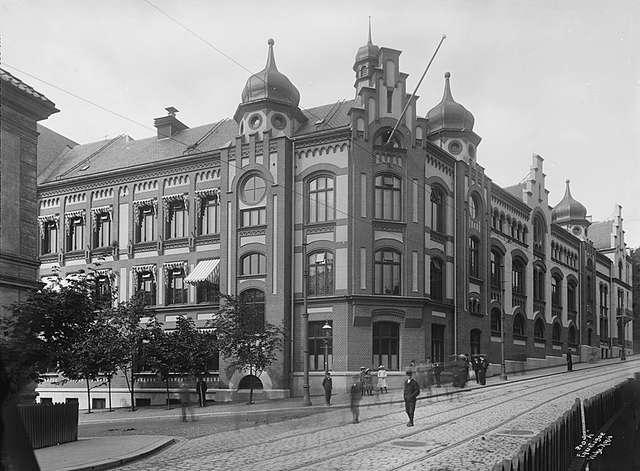
Oslo Cathedral School in 1902 (Current building, street view)

During the end of the 18th century, several reforms were implemented in Norwegian Latin-schools. Norwegian language started to be used more within the classroom; natural science lessons were given more priority; and school libraries were established. Disciplinary punishment was uncommon and used only as a last resort. Ideas from the contemporary Age of Enlightenment were also implemented, one of them being the encouragement of students to do their best.

The tradition of Latin being mandatory was abolished in 1869 – students were then given the choice between a three-year-long school run with Latin or with natural sciences.

During World War II, the German occupants employed parts of the school building, though teaching continued as usual. However, several of the teachers were involved in resistance activities against the Germans. One of the central figures of this resistance was caught while escaping to Sweden. He subsequently committed suicide in prison to avoid being coerced into revealing the resistance's activities.

Patrick Thomas Stark, appointed in 2020, is the current headmaster of the school.

== Previous headmasters ==
- Niels Treschow
- Jacob Rosted
- Hartvig Nissen
- Ludvig Vibe
- Eva Blomfeldt

== Notable alumni ==
- Caspar Wessel (1745-1818), mathematician
- Niels Henrik Abel (1802-1829), mathematician
- Henrik Wergeland (1808-1845), poet
- Johan Sverdrup (1816-1892), prime minister of Norway
- Johannes Irgens (1869 - 1939), minister of foreign affairs
- Otto Bahr Halvorsen (1872-1923), prime minister of Norway
- Edvard Munch (1863-1944), painter
- Otto Ruge (1882-1961), general, commander-in-chief of the Norwegian Armed Forces
- Arne Sunde (1883-1972), president of the United Nations Security Council 1949 and 1950
- Rolf Nordhagen (1894-1979), botanist
- Trygve Haavelmo (1911-1999), professor in economics, recipient of the 1989 Nobel Prize in Economics
- Astrid Nøklebye Heiberg (1936-2020), former minister of administration and consumer affairs, former president of the International Federation of Red Cross and Red Crescent Societies
- Harald V (1937-2026), king of Norway
- Johan Jørgen Holst (1937-1994), minister of foreign affairs and minister of defense
- Egil Kraggerud (1939-), philologist
- Jon Elster (1940-), philosopher and social scientist, professor at Columbia University and Collège de France
- Arne Treholt (1942-), diplomat, convicted of espionage in 1985
- Mads Gilbert (1947-), doctor and humanitarian worker
- Jostein Gaarder (1952-), author
- Erik Solheim (1955-), diplomat, former minister of the environment and international development
- Jens Stoltenberg (1959-), former secretary general of NATO and prime minister of Norway,
- Kjetil Try (1959-), advertising agency executive and crime fiction writer
- Erling Kagge (1963-), explorer and publisher
- Espen Barth Eide (1964-), former minister of foreign affairs, minister of climate and environment
- Thomas Seltzer (1969-), musician (Turbonegro), TV talk show host
- Anders Danielsen Lie (1979-), actor, musician, physician
- Bjørnar Moxnes (1981-), former leader of the Red Party

== See also ==
- List of the oldest schools in the world
