= Jacob Rosted =

Norwegian educator, editor, and librarian

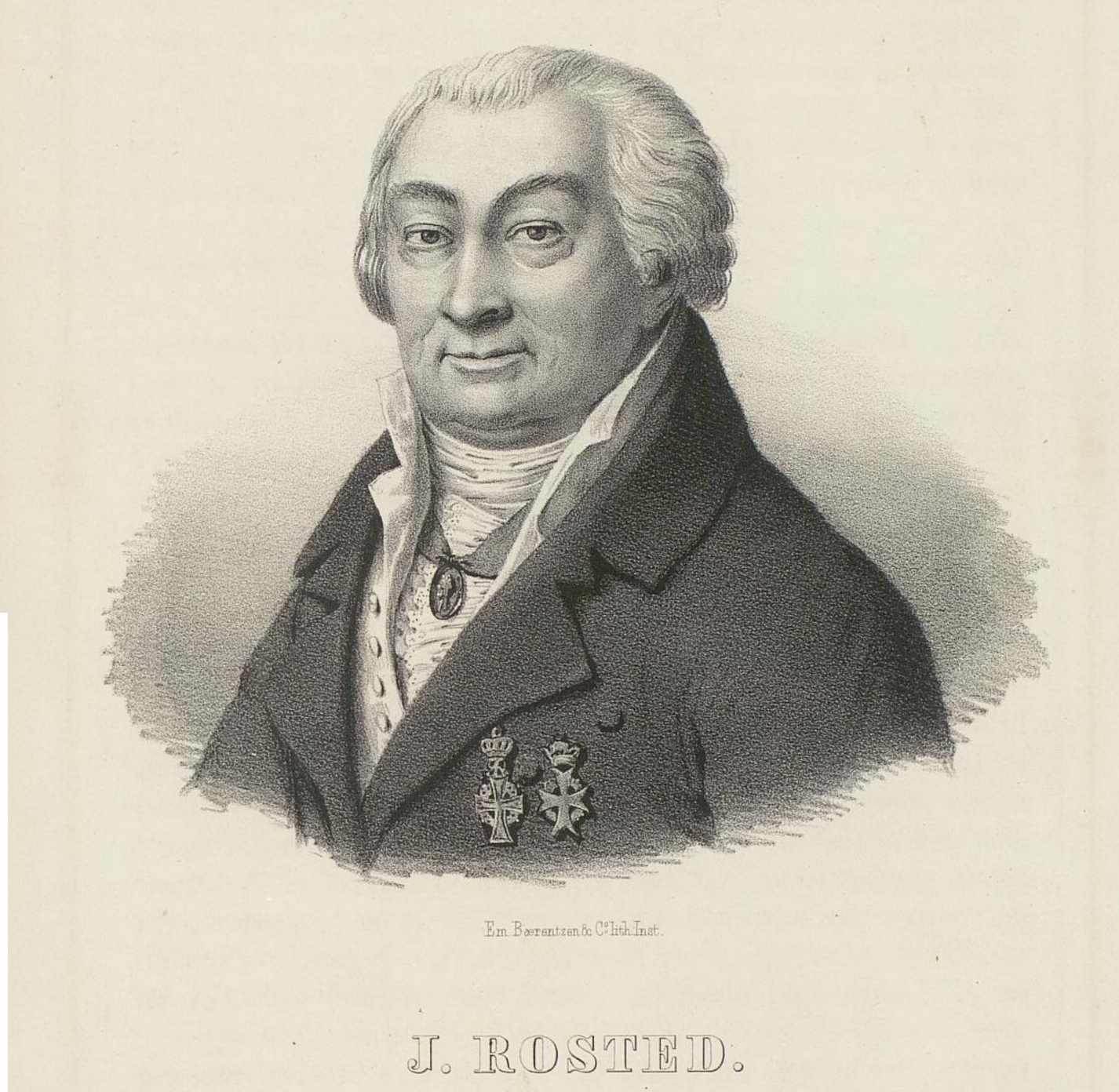
Jacob Rosted

Jacob Rosted (23 October 1750 – 8 October 1833) was a Norwegian educator, editor, and librarian.

Jacob Rosted born in Høland in Akershus, Norway. He was from a clerical family; his father was a vicar and his uncle was a priest. He studied at the University of Copenhagen where he earned his master's degree in philology in 1780. He served as rector at the Christiania Cathedral School from 1803 to 1832. Additionally, he edited the magazines Topographisk Journal for Kongeriget Norge and Hermoder from 1792 to 1808. In 1793, he sat on the committee that worked for the establishment of a Norwegian university.

Rosted was a member of Royal Norwegian Society of Sciences and Letters from 1820. He was decorated Knight of the Danish Order of Dannebrog, the Swedish Order of Vasa and the Order of the Polar Star. Rosteds gate, located between the districts of Grünerløkka and St. Hanshaugen in Oslo, was named in his honour.

== Selected works ==
- Beskrivelse over den paa Pergament skrevne Bibel, som forvares i det offentlige Deichmanske Bibliothek i Christiania (1786)
- Physisk og oeconomisk Beskrivelse over Alunværket ved Opslo, i Topographisk Journal for Kongeriget Norge (1793)
- Forsøg til en Rhetorik, i et Udtog af Hugo Blairs Forelæsninger over Rhetoriken, med Hensyn til Underviisningen i de lærde Skoler (1810)
