= Jørn Goldstein =

Norwegian Olympic ice hockey player (born 1953)

Jørn Irving Goldstein
- Born: March 27, 1953 (age 73) Oslo, Norway
- Height: 5 ft 10 in (178 cm)
- Weight: 170 lb (77 kg; 12 st 2 lb)
- Position: Goalie
- GET-ligaen team: Manglerud Star Ishockey
- National team: Norway

Jørn Irving Goldstein (born March 27, 1953) is a Norwegian Olympic ice hockey player.

== Biography ==
Goldstein was born in Oslo, Norway, and is Jewish. His mother's family, surname Schapow, immigrated to Norway from Lithuania in the early 1900s. His father, Otto Goldstein, arrived in 1947 from Germany, a Holocaust survivor who survived and was liberated in World War II from Nazi Germany's concentration camps. The family eventually moved to Ila, Trondheim.

As an 18-year old Goldstein joined Manglerud Star Ishockey, and became the team's goalkeeper. Goldstein played for the Norwegian national ice hockey team, and participated at the Winter Olympics in 1984. He was awarded Gullpucken as best Norwegian ice hockey player in 1977.

In 1983, the Norwegian director Oddvar Bull Tuhus made the movie Hockeyfeber (Hockey Fever), in which Goldstein has a central role.

== See also ==
- List of select Jewish ice hockey players
