= Tore Torell =

Norwegian magician and illusionist (1941–2018)

Torel Torell
- Born: 13 May 1941; Oslo, Reichskommissariat Norwegen (today Norway)
- Died: 7 May 2018 (aged 76); Sandefjord, Norway
- Occupations: Magician, illusionist and writer
- Awards: King's Medal of Merit

Tore Torell (13 May 1941 – 7 May 2018) was a Norwegian magician and illusionist, one of the most profound in the nation. Torell started his career at the age of eleven.

Torell published several books, spell DVDs, spells and magic sets. He also contributed in movies like 50/50, Hockeyfeber and 1958. He also had a column in Mickey Mouse's monthly booklet, which featured a Torell magic trick. He toured Norway around 20 times and was who discovered Mona Grudt, who became Miss Universe on 1990.

On 3 August 2011 Torell received the royal silver medal on board MS Color Magic. Torell entertained guests on the Oslo-Kiel stretch with over 500 performances from 1963 until 2011.

In March 2017, Torell was diagnosed with laryngeal cancer. He died in his home in Sandefjord on 7 May 2018.
