= Jon Eivind Gullord =

Norwegian actor

- Born: January 12, 1958 (age 67); Oslo, Norway
- Occupation: Actor

Jon Eivind Gullord (born January 12, 1958) is a Norwegian actor. He has been engaged at the Norwegian Theater since 1985, when he debuted there in Romeo and Juliet.

Among his performances, Gullord has played the lead roles in August Strindberg's The Ghost Sonata and Anton Chekhov's The Seagull and Three Sisters. He distinguished himself as an original character actor in the role of Cherubin in Pierre Beaumarchais's The Marriage of Figaro, the policeman Klank in Pippi Longstocking, Mordred in Tankred Dorst's Merlin oder das wüste Land, Brendan in Conor McPherson's The Weir, and the title character in Michel de Ghelderode's Pantagleize. Gullord played Volodya in Dear Yelena Sergeyevna by Lyudmila Razumovskaya. He has also had leading roles in the musicals Blood Brothers and Charley's Aunt, and he has had a guest performance at the National Traveling Theater as Lyngstrand in Henrik Ibsen's The Lady from the Sea.

== Filmography ==
- 1982: Krypskyttere as Martin Buer, a soldier
- 1987: Over grensen as a Nasjonal Samling member
- 1993: The Telegraphist as the new telegraph operator
- 1995: Hører du ikke hva jeg sier! as the receptionist
- 1999: Sophie's World as the guide in Greece
- 2004: Min misunnelige frisør as porter no. 2
