= Radko Gudas =

Czech ice hockey player (born 1990)

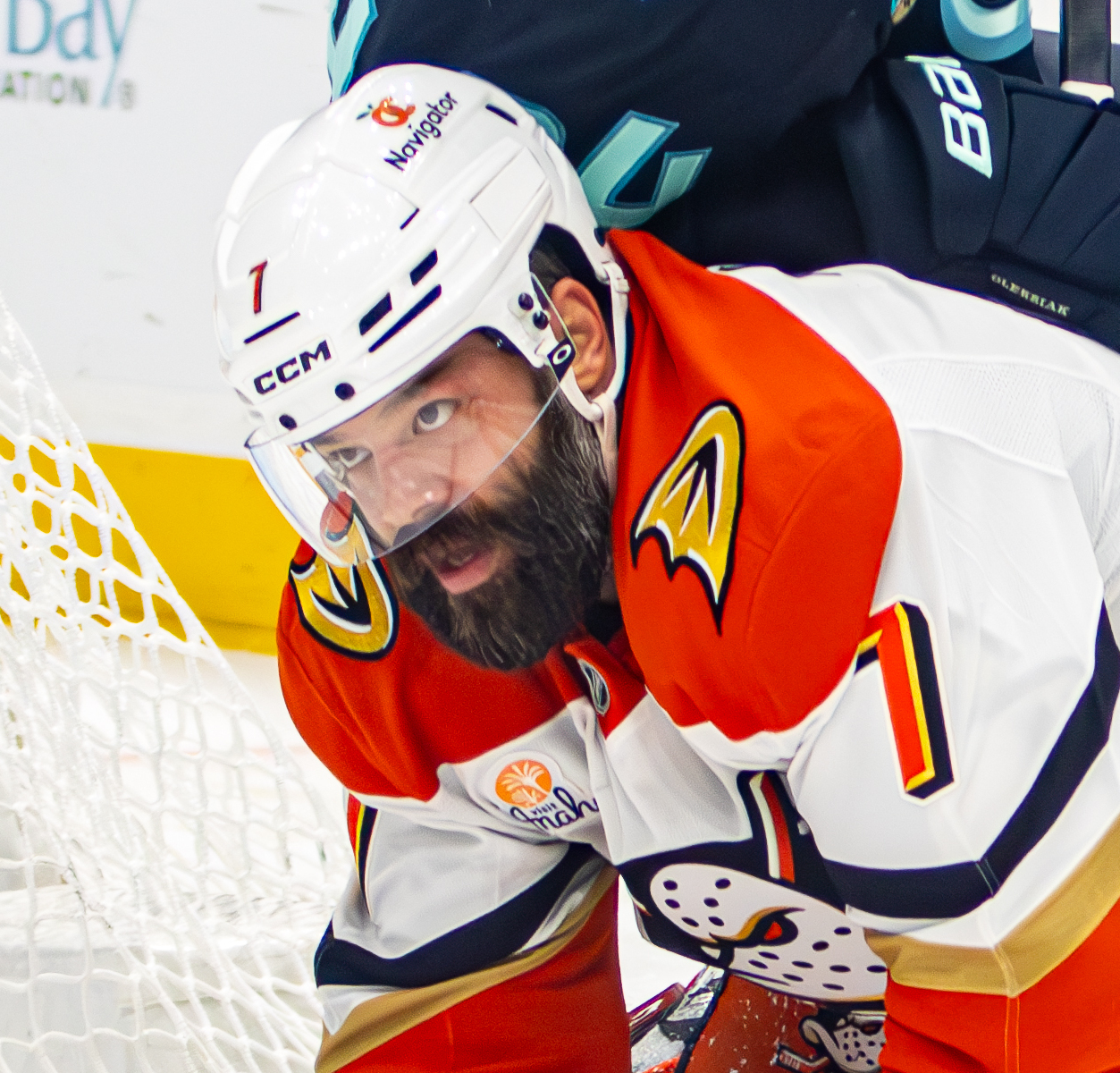
- Gudas with the Anaheim Ducks in January 2025
- Born: 5 June 1990 (age 36) Kladno, Czechoslovakia
- Height: 6 ft 0 in (183 cm)
- Weight: 208 lb (94 kg; 14 st 12 lb)
- Position: Defence
- Shoots: Right
- NHL team Former teams: Florida Panthers; Rabat Kladno; Tampa Bay Lightning; Philadelphia Flyers; Washington Capitals; Anaheim Ducks
- National team: Czech Republic
- NHL draft: 66th overall, 2010; Tampa Bay Lightning
- Playing career: 2008–present

Radko Gudas (born 5 June 1990) is a Czech professional ice hockey player who is a defenceman for the Florida Panthers in the National Hockey League (NHL). He has previously played in the NHL for the Tampa Bay Lightning, Philadelphia Flyers, Washington Capitals, and Anaheim Ducks, serving as the Ducks' captain from 2024 to 2026.

The son of Leo Gudas, who competed for Czechoslovakia at the 1992 Winter Olympics, Gudas was raised in Kladno and played for HC Rabat Kladno. He moved to North America in 2009, spending one season with the Everett Silvertips of the major junior Western Hockey League before the Tampa Bay Lightning selected him 66th overall in the 2010 NHL entry draft. Internationally Gudas played for the Czech Republic national junior team at two World Junior Championships and for the senior team at the 2014 Winter Olympics. He won a gold medal with the Czechs at the 2024 IIHF World Championship.

== Playing career ==
=== Junior ===
Gudas played in the Czech Extraliga with HC Kladno during the 2008–09 season. Gudas was selected by the Everett Silvertips of the Western Hockey League (WHL) in the first round of the CHL Import Draft with the 20th pick. After going undrafted in the 2009 NHL entry draft, Gudas was invited to the Los Angeles Kings training camp that year but was not offered a contract; Gudas was ineligible to be signed as an undrafted free agent with remaining draft eligibility since he had yet to play a complete draft season in North America. He then joined the Silvertips that fall. He had a strong season with the Silvertips, posting 7 goals, 30 assists, and 151 penalty minutes. His play for the Silvertips paid off when he was selected by the Tampa Bay Lightning in the 2010 NHL entry draft with their third-round draft pick. Gudas participated in the 2010 Lightning developmental camp that ran between 10 and 14 July. On 8 August 2010, the Lightning announced they had signed Gudas to a three-year, entry-level contract.

=== Tampa Bay Lightning ===
Gudas participated in his first NHL training camp in 2010 with the Tampa Bay Lightning. Gudas was reassigned to Tampa Bay's American Hockey League (AHL) affiliate, the Norfolk Admirals. Gudas showed a desire to lay big hits on his opposition, along with an extensive fight card in his rookie season. In total Gudas dropped the gloves 16 times, and amassed 165 penalty minutes in 76 games for the Admirals. His point totals for that season were 4 goals and 13 assists.

He spent the entire 2011–12 season in the AHL with the Admirals, and during this season Admirals set a professional hockey record by winning 28 consecutive games. Gudas helped lead the Admiral blue-line, along with fellow Lightning prospect Mark Barberio, to the 2012 Calder Cup championship in a four-game sweep of the Toronto Marlies.

Admirals and Lightning fans had been aware of Gudas' ability to grow a great beard, which he was noted for during the Admirals' playoff run. It has been a signature look of his since then.

Following the dream season for the Admirals, the Lightning ended their affiliation with Norfolk and entered into a multi-year affiliation with the Syracuse Crunch. Gudas was assigned to the Crunch for the 2012–13 AHL season. Gudas was recalled by the Lightning on 11 March 2013. Prior to being recalled he had 4 goals and 20 points for the Crunch, at the time leading the AHL with a plus/minus rating of plus-32. He was also fourth in the league with 207 penalty minutes.

Gudas played his first NHL game against the Florida Panthers. Gudas posted three blocked shots, and two hits in 15:20 of playtime. During this game Gudas went to lay a hit on Panthers forward Kris Versteeg, who attempted to avoid the hit, but still collided with him. Versteeg wound up leaving the game with what appeared to be a right leg injury. It was revealed two days later that Versteeg would need to undergo season-ending knee surgery due to the collision. Gudas finished the remainder of the season with the Lightning, playing in 22 contests. He posted 2 goals, 3 assists, 38 penalty minutes and was a +3 in his first NHL season. Gudas rejoined the Crunch at the finish of the NHL regular season to help Syracuse Crunch in the 2013 Calder Cup playoffs. Gudas suffered a MCL injury during the Eastern Conference championship series, and missed the first four games of the Calder Cup Finals. The Crunch fell to the Grand Rapids Griffins to end Gudas' AHL career.

On 6 May 2013, the Lightning announced they had signed Gudas to a three-year contract extension.

Gudas was thrust into a top-4 role on defence for the season, with Eric Brewer being moved to a more manageable third pair role. Gudas continued to play his physical game. His rough and tumble in-your-face game also landed Gudas in trouble at a few points during the season. The biggest incident involved Florida Panthers forward Scottie Upshall squirting Gudas with a bottle of water from after he had fallen in front of the Panthers bench. Gudas retaliated by smashing his stick on the Panthers in frustration. He was ejected from the game for his actions, though the Lightning went on to win the game despite being down a defenceman. Gudas also received a match penalty against the Dallas Stars on 5 March 2014, although Tampa Bay general manager Steve Yzerman announced there would not be any additional discipline from the league. Gudas finished his first full NHL season by playing three games in the Stanley Cup playoffs for the Lightning in a 4-game sweep by the Montreal Canadiens.

In the 2014–15 season, on 6 January 2015, Gudas underwent arthroscopic knee surgery. The Lightning announced that he would be out for the remainder of the regular season.

=== Philadelphia Flyers ===
On 2 March 2015, at the trade deadline Gudas was traded by the Lightning along with a first and third-round selection in the 2015 NHL entry draft to the Philadelphia Flyers in exchange for defenceman Braydon Coburn.

Gudas was suspended for three games on 2 December 2015, for an illegal check to the head of Mika Zibanejad during a 4–2 win against the Ottawa Senators the night before. He was not assessed a penalty for the hit during the game, though Zibanejad left the game.

Gudas signed a four-year contract with the Flyers worth $13.4 million on 23 June 2016.

In an 8 October 2016, pre-season game against the Boston Bruins, Gudas delivered an interfering hit on Austin Czarnik, who left the game and soon underwent concussion protocol. While Gudas was assessed a minor penalty for boarding during the game, upon review of the incident, the NHL Department of Player Safety eventually suspended Gudas for six games, in part because of his previous suspension in 2015.

=== Washington Capitals ===
On 14 June 2019, Gudas was traded from the Flyers to the Washington Capitals in exchange for defenceman Matt Niskanen.

=== Florida Panthers ===
As a free agent from the Capitals, Gudas signed on the opening day of free agency to remain in the Eastern Conference in signing a three-year, $7.5 million contract with the Florida Panthers on 9 October 2020.

=== Anaheim Ducks ===
On 1 July 2023, Gudas signed as a free agent to a three-year, $12 million contract with the Anaheim Ducks. Entering his second season in Anaheim, Gudas was named the ninth captain in Ducks franchise history.

On 13 March 2026, in a game versus the Toronto Maple Leafs, Gudas charged and delivered a knee-on-knee hit to Maple Leafs captain Auston Matthews, causing Matthews to tear his MCL and miss the remainder of the regular season. Gudas was suspended five games for the play. The play and suspension brought attention and pushback from several hockey commentators and fans to Gudas' potentially violent play, particularly given Gudas' suspension history and that he had also caused a notable injury to Sidney Crosby during the 2026 Winter Olympics a few weeks earlier. The pushback caused George Parros, the head of the NHL's Department of Player Safety, to schedule a rare media availability to respond to reporter questions, and fly to attend a 31 March rematch between the Ducks and Maple Leafs in person in response to anticipated heightened tensions during the game. Following the opening faceoff of the match, Gudas fought Maple Leafs player Max Domi due to his hit of Matthews.

=== Return to Florida ===
As a pending free agent, Gudas was traded from Anaheim back to the Panthers on 29 June 2026, in exchange for A. J. Greer. He later signed a six-year, $9 million contract extension with the Panthers on 1 July.

== International play ==
Medal record

Men's ice hockey

Representing the Czech Republic

World Championships
Gold medal – first place	2024 Czechia	

On 6 January 2014, Gudas was named to the Czech Republic national team with teammate Ondřej Palát for the 2014 Winter Olympics. Gudas missed two games in the Olympics due to an illness. He appeared in three games and recorded four penalty minutes during the tournament. The Czech Republic team was eliminated by United States in the quarterfinals.

He represented his country at the 2024 World Championship and won a gold medal.

He represented the Czech Republic at the 2026 Winter Olympics. The Czechs were eliminated during the quarterfinals game against Canada. During the game, Gudas was involved in a play which caused an injury to Canadian captain Sidney Crosby, leading Crosby to miss the remainder of the tournament and several weeks of the NHL season after.

== Criticism ==
Gudas' style of play has resulted in criticism, ejections, injuries to opposing players, and subsequent reviews and suspensions from the NHL's Department of Player Safety. NBC Sports writer James O'Brien noted Gudas' growing list of indiscretions in late 2016, writing that “If the Department of Player Safety had a speed dial list of regulars, Gudas would have a prominent spot on it.” Hockey writers have described him as reckless and as a player who consistently demonstrates no regard for opponents in vulnerable positions. As a member of the Flyers, he has been referred to by the Philadelphia sports press as a player who “represents everything that the Flyers once were and should no longer aspire to be”, as well as “a cheap-shot aficionado, reckless, careless, damaging to the Flyers' chances of winning and to other athletes' health and safety, a player who can't be trusted by either his teammates or his opponents to play a tough, clean game.”

On 2 December 2015, the league issued Gudas a three-game suspension for a headshot delivered to Ottawa forward Mika Zibanejad a day earlier, noting that an injury was caused and that the targeting of the head was avoidable. On 10 October 2016, Gudas was issued a six-game suspension for an injury-causing hit delivered to the head of Boston Bruins' forward Austin Czarnik in a pre-season exhibition game.

Gudas has also been involved in numerous questionable plays in which he has avoided disciplinary action despite placing opponents in danger or causing injury. This history of delivering dangerous hits while typically avoiding suspension has been referred to facetiously as Gudas' "signature skill" as a professional hockey player. In mid-February 2016, Gudas was ejected from a game for the third time in sixteen days after he injured New Jersey Devils' forward Bobby Farnham with a late hit which targeted the head of a player not involved in the play. Gudas was ejected for boarding New York Rangers' forward Jimmy Vesey in a pre-season game on 3 October 2016, receiving a five-minute major penalty and a game misconduct. On 26 October 2017, Gudas was again ejected, receiving a five-minute major and a game misconduct after targeting the head of Ottawa Senators' defenceman Chris Wideman.

Flyers' coach Dave Hakstol and general manager Ron Hextall were reported to have met with Gudas in early 2016 to discuss his on-ice actions. The Philadelphia sports press noted that Gudas' behavior only worsened after the meeting, lamenting that Gudas' on-ice actions were likely to encourage retaliation not against himself, but against the Flyers' star players such as Claude Giroux and Jakub Voráček.

On 20 November 2017, Gudas was suspended for ten games without pay for a slash to the neck of Winnipeg Jets' forward Mathieu Perreault while Perreault was in a prone position on the ice. Upon returning from this ten-game suspension, Gudas immediately found himself in the news again after leaving his feet to deliver a hit to New Jersey Devils' forward Kyle Palmieri on 1 February 2018. Though he avoided another suspension and claimed the incident was accidental, Palmieri said he believed Gudas no longer deserved the benefit of the doubt in light of his history, adding that he felt the Flyers' player had "run out of second chances."

At the 2026 Winter Olympics, Gudas was involved in two hits that injured Sidney Crosby, forcing him to withdraw from the quarterfinal game. Crosby was participating in his third Olympics for Canada, was captain of the team, and all-time leading scorer for Canadian Olympians during the era allowing NHL players. Crosby did not play for the remainder of the tournament and missed several weeks of the NHL season afterwards.

On 12 March 2026, Gudas delivered a knee-on-knee hit to Toronto Maple Leafs captain Auston Matthews, ending his season; the following day, Gudas was suspended five games.

== Personal life ==
Gudas is the son of Leo Gudas, a former professional ice hockey player. He met his future wife Barbora Chrenková, an actress, through his sister and they were married in 2016. They have four children together. Gudas' sister, actress and singer Karolina Gudasová, is married to former Philadelphia Flyers teammate Michal Neuvirth.

== Career statistics ==
=== Regular season and playoffs ===
			Regular season					Playoffs
Season	Team	League	GP	G	A	Pts	PIM	GP	G	A	Pts	PIM
2004–05	HC Rabat Kladno	CZE U18	46	1	5	6	70	7	0	0	0	10
2005–06	HC Rabat Kladno	CZE U18	46	12	14	26	178	5	1	2	3	8
2006–07	HC Rabat Kladno	CZE U18	16	6	7	13	34	7	4	1	5	14
2006–07	HC Rabat Kladno	CZE U20	15	0	1	1	18	1	0	0	0	0
2006–07	HC Berounští Medvědi	CZE.2	9	0	1	1	6	—	—	—	—	—
2007–08	HC Berounští Medvědi	CZE.2	35	0	4	4	61	—	—	—	—	—
2007–08	HC Kladno	ELH	—	—	—	—	—	1	0	0	0	0
2008–09	HC Kladno	CZE U20	2	0	1	1	0	—	—	—	—	—
2008–09	HC Kladno	ELH	7	0	1	1	8	—	—	—	—	—
2008–09	HC Berounští Medvědi	CZE.2	21	0	3	3	74	—	—	—	—	—
2009–10	Everett Silvertips	WHL	65	7	30	37	151	3	0	2	2	4
2010–11	Norfolk Admirals	AHL	76	4	13	17	165	6	0	0	0	7
2011–12	Norfolk Admirals	AHL	73	7	13	20	195	16	0	3	3	14
2012–13	Syracuse Crunch	AHL	57	4	16	20	207	12	2	1	3	34
2012–13	Tampa Bay Lightning	NHL	22	2	3	5	38	—	—	—	—	—
2013–14	Tampa Bay Lightning	NHL	73	3	19	22	152	3	0	1	1	9
2014–15	Tampa Bay Lightning	NHL	31	2	3	5	34	—	—	—	—	—
2015–16	Philadelphia Flyers	NHL	76	5	9	14	116	6	0	0	0	18
2016–17	Philadelphia Flyers	NHL	67	6	17	23	93	—	—	—	—	—
2017–18	Philadelphia Flyers	NHL	70	2	14	16	83	6	0	0	0	9
2018–19	Philadelphia Flyers	NHL	77	4	16	20	63	—	—	—	—	—
2019–20	Washington Capitals	NHL	63	2	13	15	40	5	0	2	2	2
2020–21	Florida Panthers	NHL	54	2	9	11	40	6	1	1	2	4
2021–22	Florida Panthers	NHL	77	3	13	16	105	10	0	2	2	6
2022–23	Florida Panthers	NHL	72	2	15	17	79	21	0	3	3	34
2023–24	Anaheim Ducks	NHL	66	6	12	18	128	—	—	—	—	—
2024–25	Anaheim Ducks	NHL	81	1	15	16	86	—	—	—	—	—
2025–26	Anaheim Ducks	NHL	56	2	11	13	67	1	0	0	0	0
NHL totals			885	42	169	211	1,124	58	1	9	10	82

=== International ===
Year	Team	Event	Result	GP	G	A	Pts	PIM
2008	Czech Republic	U18 D1	11th	5	1	1	2	12
2009	Czech Republic	WJC	6th	6	2	1	3	8
2010	Czech Republic	WJC	7th	6	0	2	2	14
2014	Czech Republic	OG	6th	3	0	0	0	4
2017	Czech Republic	WC	7th	8	2	1	3	6
2018	Czech Republic	WC	7th	8	0	2	2	4
2019	Czech Republic	WC	4th	10	1	3	4	8
2024	Czechia	WC	1st place, gold medalist(s)	10	0	1	1	16
2026	Czechia	OG	8th	5	0	1	1	4
Junior totals				17	3	4	7	34
Senior totals				44	3	8	11	42

Sporting positions
Preceded by Ryan Getzlaf	Anaheim Ducks captain 2024–2026	Succeeded by Mikael Granlund
