= Blücher (film) =

1988 Norwegian thriller film directed by Oddvar Bull Tuhus

- Directed by: Oddvar Bull Tuhus
- Written by: Oddvar Bull Tuhus; Sverre Årnes
- Starring: Helge Jordal; Frank Krog; Hege Schøyen
- Music by: Lillebjørn Nilsen; Arild Andersen
- Release date: 16 June 1989
- Running time: 94 minutes
- Country: Norway
- Language: Norwegian

Blücher is a 1988 Norwegian thriller film directed by Oddvar Bull Tuhus, starring Helge Jordal, Frank Krog and Hege Schøyen. Two North Sea divers who have recently been fired plan to vindicate themselves by a pioneer expedition to the wreckage of the German cruiser Blücher, at the bottom of the Oslofjord. The expedition soon becomes entangled in political intrigues.

== Plot ==
Two daring divers have recently been fired from their previous jobs in the North Sea, but want once and for all to demonstrate their superior skills as divers. Therefore, they are planning an expedition all the way down to the wreck of the German warship "Blücher", which was sunk outside Oscarsborg fortress on April 9, 1940.

However, unknown forces try to hinder the divers' mission. This is because there are papers on board, with information that can not stand the light of day.
