= Leo Gudas =

Czech ice hockey player

- Born: May 20, 1965 (age 60) Bruntál, Czechoslovakia
- Height: 6 ft 0 in (183 cm)
- Weight: 194 lb (88 kg; 13 st 12 lb)
- Position: Defence
- Shot: Left
- Played for: CZE; HC Sparta Praha; HC Kometa Brno; SM-liiga; JYP Jyväskylä; 1.GBun; Hedos München; NLA; EHC Biel; DEL; Augsburger Panther; DEL2; Heilbronner Falken
- National team: Czechoslovakia
- NHL draft: 251st overall, 1990; Calgary Flames
- Playing career: 1988–2002

Leo Gudas (born May 20, 1965) is a Czech former professional ice hockey defenceman.

== Playing career ==
Gudas began his playing career in 1981 with TJ PS Stadion Liberec in the second-tier 1st. Czech National Hockey League before joining HC Sparta Praha of the top-tier Czechoslovak First Ice Hockey League in 1983. He moved to HK Dukla Trenčín in 1986 for one season before returning to Sparta Praha.

In 1990, Gudas was drafted into the National Hockey League, selected 251st overall by the Calgary Flames in the 1990 NHL entry draft. Gudas though never signed with the Flames, nor did he ever play in North America. Instead, he moved to Finland and signed for JYP Jyväskylä in the SM-liiga. After two seasons, he moved to Germany's Eishockey-Bundesliga and signed for Hedos München before returning to Sparta Praha for a third spell, in the newly created Czech Extraliga, founded following the peaceful separation of Czechoslovakia.

Gudas later had spells in Switzerland's National League for EHC Biel and in Norway's GET-ligaen for the Spektrum Flyers before returning to the Czech Extraliga once more in 1995, signing for HC Kometa Brno. In 1996, Gudas moved to Sweden with IF Troja-Ljungby in the Hockeyettan before returning to Germany in 1998 for the Augsburger Panther of the Deutsche Eishockey Liga, the successor league to the Bundesliga he played in six years prior. He followed up with spell in the 2nd Bundesliga for Heilbronner EC and in the Czech 1.liga for HC Berounští Medvědi before ending his playing career in 2003.

== Coaching career ==
Gudas worked as an assistant coach for HC Sparta Praha and Piráti Chomutov before becoming head coach for SK Kadaň. He also worked as head coach for HC Most, ŠHK 37 Piešťany and SC Csíkszereda.

== Personal life ==
Gudas is the father of Anaheim Ducks defenseman Radko Gudas. He is also the father-in-law of goaltender Michal Neuvirth, following Neuvirth's marriage to Gudas' daughter, Karolina.

== Career statistics ==
=== Regular season and playoffs ===
			Regular season					Playoffs
Season	Team	League	GP	G	A	Pts	PIM	GP	G	A	Pts	PIM
1981–82	TJ PS Stadion Liberec	CZE.2	—	—	—	—	—	—	—	—	—	—
1982–83	TJ PS Stadion Liberec	CZE.2	—	—	—	—	—	—	—	—	—	—
1983–84	TJ Sparta ČKD Praha	TCH	35	0	2	2	18	—	—	—	—	—
1984–85	TJ Sparta ČKD Praha	TCH	36	1	3	4	24	—	—	—	—	—
1985–86	ASD Dukla Jihlava B	CZE.2	41	6	12	18	—	—	—	—	—	—
1986–87	ASVŠ Dukla Trenčín	TCH	31	3	3	6	50	—	—	—	—	—
1987–88	TJ Sparta ČKD Praha	TCH	46	4	11	15	95	—	—	—	—	—
1988–89	TJ Sparta ČKD Praha	TCH	37	7	12	19	41	—	—	—	—	—
1989–90	TJ Sparta ČKD Praha	TCH	55	11	17	28	92	—	—	—	—	—
1990–91	JYP	SM-l	44	10	19	29	60	7	2	6	8	8
1991–92	JYP	SM-l	44	5	17	22	80	8	1	1	2	6
1992–93	Hedos München	1.GBun	42	4	22	26	91	—	—	—	—	—
1992–93	HC Sparta Praha	TCH	9	0	1	1	—	—	—	—	—	—
1993–94	HC Sparta Praha	ELH	4	1	0	1	6	2	0	0	0	6
1993–94	EHC Biel-Bienne	NDA	11	0	3	3	6	—	—	—	—	—
1994–95	Spektrum Flyers	NOR	—	—	—	—	—	—	—	—	—	—
1995–96	HC Kometa Brno BVV	ELH	35	3	12	15	100	—	—	—	—	—
1996–97	IF Troja/Ljungby	SWE.2	28	5	5	10	55	10	1	3	4	16
1997–98	IF Troja/Ljungby	SWE.2	31	6	8	14	34	10	2	0	2	24
1998–99	Augsburger Panther	DEL	49	4	12	16	56	—	—	—	—	—
1999–2000	Augsburger Panther	DEL	54	2	7	9	83	3	0	0	0	4
2000–01	Heilbronner EC	DEU.2	41	5	4	9	58	9	2	1	3	46
2001–02	Heilbronner EC	DEU.2	33	2	13	15	50	5	0	1	1	8
2002–03	HC Berounští Medvědi	CZE.2	14	0	1	1	6	—	—	—	—	—
TCH totals			249	26	49	75	320	—	—	—	—	—
SM-l totals			88	15	36	51	140	15	3	7	10	14
DEL totals			103	6	19	25	139	3	0	0	0	4

=== International ===
Olympic medal record

Men's Ice hockey
Bronze medal – third place	1992 Albertville	Ice hockey

Year	Team	Event	GP	G	A	Pts	PIM
1983	Czechoslovakia	EJC	—	—	—	—	—
1985	Czechoslovakia	WJC	7	1	3	4	14
1989	Czechoslovakia	WC	9	0	3	3	8
1990	Czechoslovakia	WC	6	2	1	3	10
1991	Czechoslovakia	WC	3	1	0	1	4
1991	Czechoslovakia	CC	5	1	0	1	10
1992	Czechoslovakia	WC	8	0	3	3	16
1992	Czechoslovakia	OG	8	0	2	2	6
1993	Czech Republic	WC	8	1	2	3	12
Senior totals			47	5	11	16	66
