= Spektrum Flyers =

- City: Oslo, Norway
- League: Eliteserien
- Founded: 1994
- Folded: 1996
- Home arena: Oslo Spektrum
- General manager: Rolf Kirkvaag jr.

Franchise history
- 1994–1996: Spektrum Flyers
- 1996–present: Bergen Flyers

Spektrum Flyers was a short-lived ice hockey team from Oslo, Norway. A merger between Manglerud Star and Furuset, it played the 1994–95 and 1995–96 seasons in Eliteserien, the premier ice hockey league in Norway, with home games at Oslo Spektrum. The team relocated to Bergen after two seasons.

== History ==
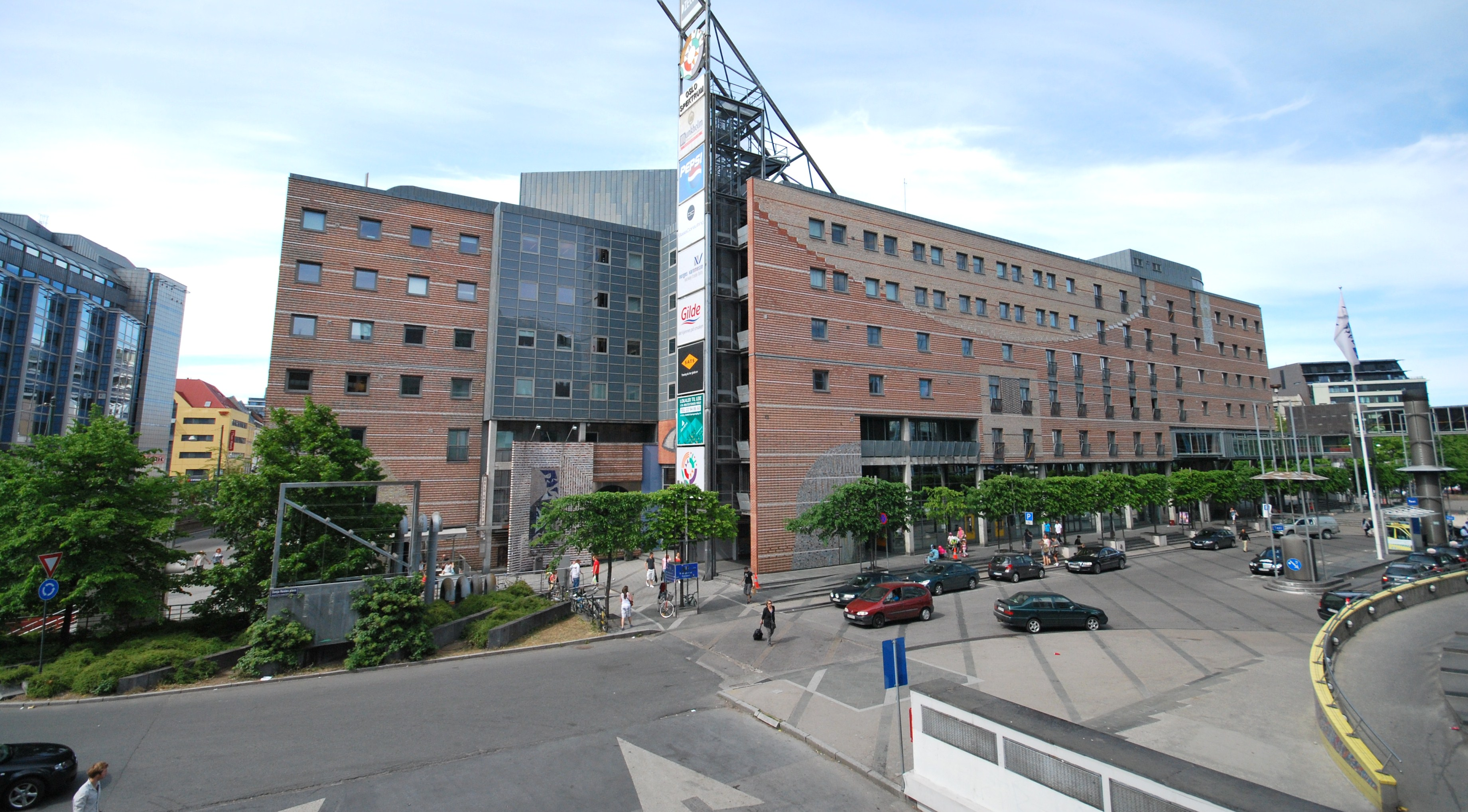
Oslo Spektrum was the home ground of the team

=== Establishment ===
Manglerud Star and Furuset had formerly cooperated with the team Oslo Hockey. After it was dissolved, Manglerud Star became a farm team for Vålerenga Ishockey. Following the opening of Oslo Spektrum in 1990, Vålerenga moved their games to the venue in the heart of Oslo. After the end of the 1992–93 season, the team returned to its old venue, Jordal Amfi, and Oslo Spektrum started looking for a new tenant. Oslo Spektrum's new management company, SMGManagement, encouraged Manglerud Star and Furuset to play some of their games at Oslo Spektrum. Instead, the two teams decided to merge their top-level teams to create a team that all of Oslo could support. In September 1993, Furuset, Manglerud Star and SMG signed an interim agreement, which would establish the new team in the city center. The new team received an exclusive right to play matches at Spektrum, and SMG would perform marketing of the games. The condition was that at least one of the two teams succeeded at keeping their place in the premier league.

The team received 1 million Norwegian krone from the two mother teams to purchase six top players, including two from Canada. The team's management stated that they were working on a cooperation with the National Hockey League (NHL) side Philadelphia Flyers. In a deal in November 1993, Furuset-players Cato Tom Andersen, Christian Kjeldsberg and Jan Roar Fagerli all transferred to Manglerud Star for the 1993–94 season, which Furuset would play in First Division. The players were intended to be transferred to Spektrum Flyers. In March 1994, Ole Jacob Libæk, who was instrumental in the creation of the new team and had been appointed chair, stated that he wanted Vålerenga to also participate. He hoped that this would create sufficient interest to generate four to five thousand spectators per match, which would be necessary to maintain a professional team.

Rolf Kirkvaag jr. was hired as the team's director. On 22 April 1994, the club announced that Serge Boisvert, a former NHL-player, would be player-coach. Rumors had it that George Kingston had been a possible candidate. The team received a budget of NOK 7 million for the first season. In June, the team signed Lillehammer IK-player Tommy Jakobsen, who had previously played for Furuset. In July, the Czech national team and HC Sparta Praha back Leo Gudas signed for the club. Other players included Geir Hoff, Vegar Barlie, Jarle Friis, Per Odvar and Knut Walbye. In June, the team was registered as a limited company. However, it was late sending in its budget to the Norwegian Ice Hockey Association, and nearly lost its license to play. It received permission to play three of its matches in the opening season at Gjøvik Olympic Cavern Hall in Gjøvik.

The team's first match was a friendly against Storhamar on 16 August in Gjøvik, which The Flyers lost 2–5. In September, the team ended second in the friendly Panasonic Cup in Denmark. Libæk stated that he had been in contact with IMG, who wanted to create a pan-European ice hockey league, and that The Flyers was the prime candidate to represent Norway. The Flyers was offered NOK 70 million to play in the league, which was planned to have 12 teams and be named the International Hockey League (IHL). The Norwegian Ice Hockey Association stated that after an agreement between NHL and the International Ice Hockey Federation (IIHF), Flyers would be banned from playing in Eliteserien if they formally associated themselves with IHL.

In the last friendly before the league started, Flyers beat Vålerenga 4–1 on 18 September. In the league debut on 25 September, the two teams met in front of 3,121 spectators at Jordal, where Vålerenga won 5–3. In its home debut on 29 September, Flyers beat Trondheim IK 5–3. With only 1770 of the 2400 spectators paying, the team management stated that it would be difficult to pay the NOK 100,000 per game which Oslo Spektrum charged. The team had been marketing the game by handing out 1,200 free tickets to school children, but required the parents who accompanied the children to pay for the tickets. At the same time, Vegard Barlie criticized the club for not wanting to sign a contract, after he had punctured a lung.

=== Bergen ===
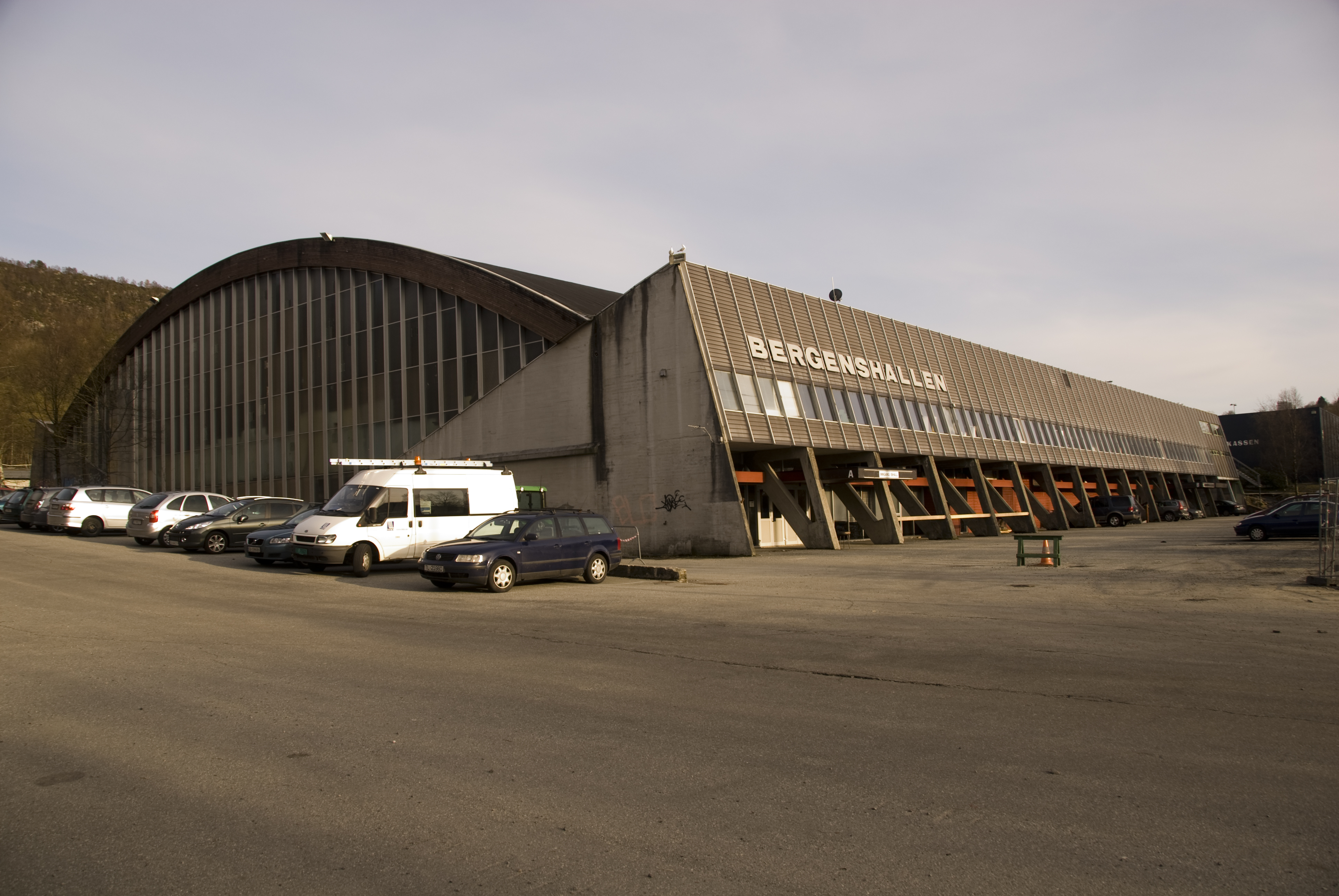
Bergenshallen in Bergen

On 19 January 1996, Kirkvaag stated that the club was planning to move to Bergen, and that this could happen as early as for the play-offs. The stated reasons for this were that Oslo Municipality would not give the club any subsidies, and the high cost of playing at Oslo Spektrum. The team would then have been renamed The Bergen Flyers and play their matches in Bergenshallen. The management of Manglerud Star stated that they were opposed to the plans, and that it was unrealistic to move an entire club, even if permission was granted. Initially the plans were to only play the playoff matches in Bergen, and the club would thereby be required to pay the transport to and overnighting in Bergen for both themselves and the opponent teams. At the time, Bergen—Norway's second-largest city—did not have a team in the premier league. An official application to move was sent to the Norwegian Ice Hockey Association on 26 January. The application was approved by the association, and the club announced it would play its first play-off match in Bergenshallen on 15 February.

On 1 February, the Kirkvaag stated that they had decided to move the team permanently to Bergen. Vålerenga stated that it was opposed to the play-off games being played in Bergen and that they wanted a possible local derby between the Oslo teams to be played in the city. Representatives from the Norwegian Ice Hockey Association stated that Flyers had primarily given financial reasons for the move, but that they at the same time had rejected playing their matches at Jordal Amfi, which would have cost a lot less. The first training in Bergenshallen took place on 7 February. On 15 February, the annual meeting in Manglerud Star decided to terminate the agreement with The Flyers, as it did not want its elite team to play out of town. Those players who were under contract with Manglerud Star would return, and the team would revoke its premier league license, which it would use to play itself with home matches at Manglerudhallen. The contract with Flyers would terminate from 1 May, although the latter was free to use the rest of its resources (albeit without a license to play in the top division) in Bergen.

The team's first match in Bergen was a quarter-final against Stjernen; despite having a 3–0 lead, Flyers ended up losing 3–4. The match was seen by 2,532 spectators, and Kirkvaag stated that he satisfied with the turn-up. Four days later, the team lost 2–1 against Lillehammer. They were sent out of the play-offs after a 5–3 loss against Stjernen on 23 February. The final match was played against Lillehammer in Bergen. Afterwards, Kirkvaag stated that the team had three options: either take over the elite licenses of Hasle-Løren, Manglerud Star or Lørenskog IK and move the team to Bergen; take over the license in the First Division of Bergen IK and attempt to win the league to be promoted to the top division, or participate in the planned International Hockey League. Kirkvaag stated that no matter what, the team would play in Bergen.

Twelve of the Flyers players were transferred back to Manglerud Star. By April, Flyers had not paid wages since 1 January and the Norwegian Players' Association threatened to file the company for bankruptcy. By June, Serge Boisvert, Sergej Pusjkov, Geir Hoff, Cato Tom Andersen, Jan-Roar Fagerli and Lars E. Lund had all signed for Vålerenga. Hoff, Lund and Fagerli all had contracts with Manglerud Star, but these were terminated and the players became free agents after Flyers had failed to meet their financial obligations. Kirkvaag took over as director of Bergen IK, which rebranded itself as Bergen Flyers and introduced many of the same concepts as The Spektrum Flyers had in an attempt to increase spectator rates.

== Results ==
Season	Rank	GP	W	T	L	GF	GA	Pts	Ref
1994–95	4	28	15	3	10	118	84	33	
1995–96	4	28	18	1	9	132	90	37	
