= Oslo Hockey =

- City: Oslo, Norway
- League: Eliteserien
- Founded: 1989

Oslo Hockey was a short-lived ice hockey team from Oslo, Norway. The first merger between Manglerud Star and Furuset, it played the 1989–90 season in Eliteserien, the premier ice hockey league in Norway. The teams stayed independent in competitions, with Furuset being the first team and Manglerud Star being a farm team. The project dissolved in 1990.
