= Tom Røymark =

Norwegian ice hockey player

- Born: 23 April 1950 (age 76) Oslo, Norway
- Height: 6 ft 0 in (183 cm)
- Weight: 172 lb (78 kg; 12 st 4 lb)
- Position: Right wing
- Shot: Left
- Played for: Hasle-Løren IL; Frisk Asker; Manglerud Star Ishockey
- National team: Norway
- Playing career: 1969–1981

Tom Eddy Røymark (born 23 April 1950) is a Norwegian former professional ice hockey player. He played for the Norwegian national ice hockey team, and participated at the Winter Olympics in 1972 and 1980. He was Norwegian champion in 1977 and 1978.

During his career, Røymark played for Hasle/Løren IL, Frisk Asker and Manglerud Star Ishockey.
