= Vazelina Bilopphøggers =

Norwegian rockabilly band

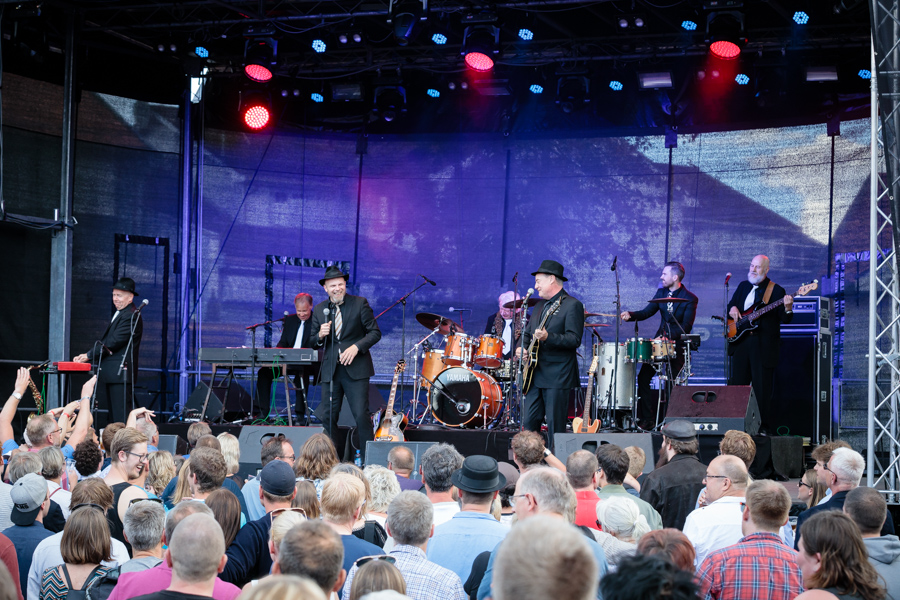
- In 2017

Background information
- Origin: Gjøvik, Norway
- Genres: Rockabilly
- Years active: 1979–2022
- Website: www.vazelina.no

Vazelina Bilopphøggers were a Norwegian band founded in 1979, in Gjøvik, Norway. They are known for their comedic re-interpretations of old rockabilly songs, where they re-write the lyrics in their own dialect. They have had several hits in Norway and have worked with many Norwegian stage artists and comedians. They have also been interpreted through comic books and computer games. In 1991 they provided the music for the Norwegian version of Rock-a-Doodle, and also provided the voices of some of the characters in the Norwegian dub; Viggo Sandvik voiced Chanticleer, Eldar Vågan voiced Patou, Jan Einar Johnsen voiced Snipes and Arnulf Paulsen voiced Stuey. In December 2000 they starred in a Christmas revue on TV 2.

They are one of the active groups in Norway that have been playing the longest. The name, as the myth goes, was improvised on the phone, when they needed a band name in their first competition, where they won. Bilopphøggers is a variation of the Norwegian word for auto wreckers, and drummer Arnulf Paulsen ran a wrecking yard on the side.

In September 2019, the band announced that they would call it quits after the farewell concert "40 år med vondt brenn'vin (40 years of bad liquor)" in Oslo Spektrum in March 2020. The concert was sold out in 3 minutes, and an extra concert was added the day before. The concerts were postponed three times, and the farewell concert was finally held on 8 October 2022.

== Current members ==
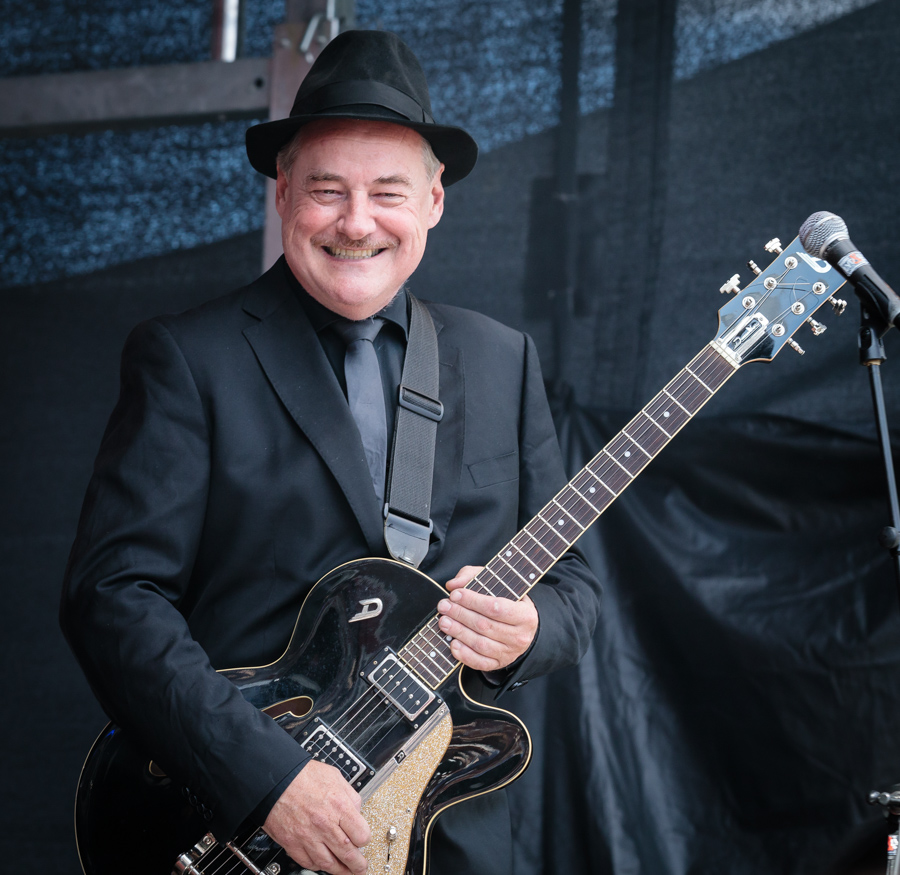
Eldar Vågan – guitar, accordion (1979–2022)

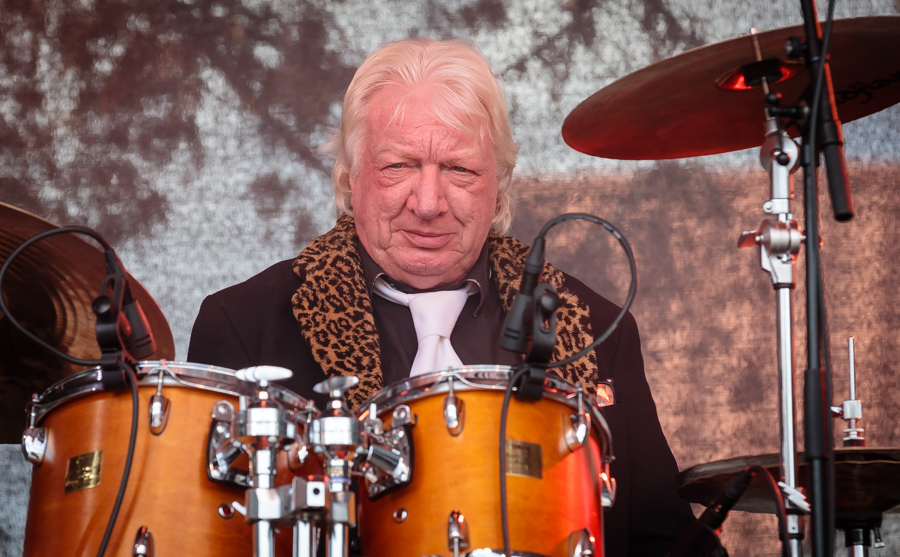
Arnulf Paulsen – drums (1979–2022)

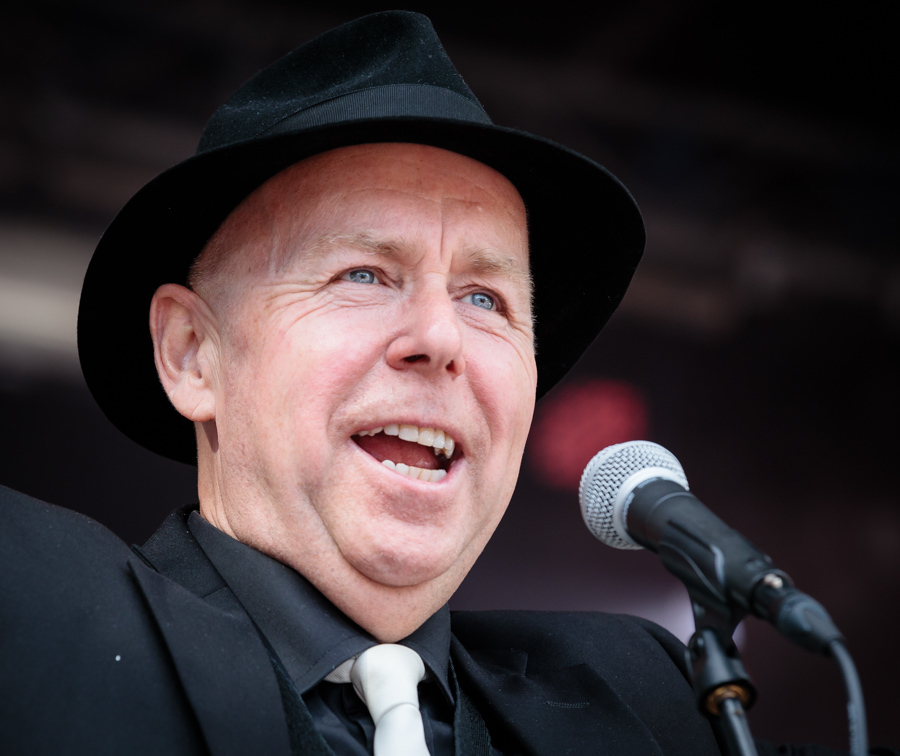
Jan Einar Johnsen – saxophone, organ (1979–2022)

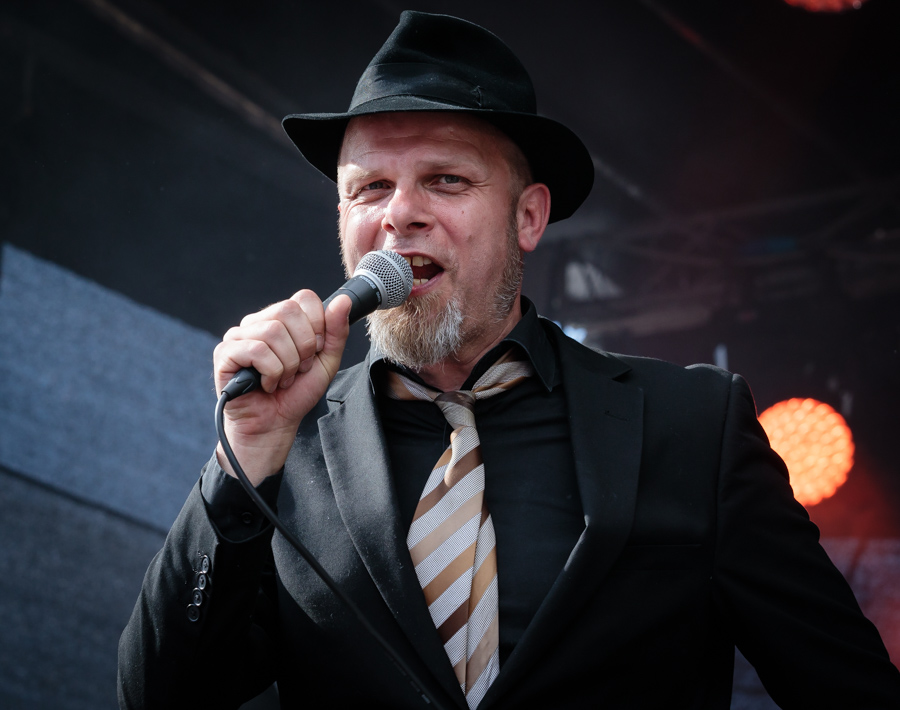
Kjetil Foseid – singer (2006–2022)

== Live members ==
- Tor Welo – piano and keyboard (1990–2022)
- Terje Methi – bass guitar (1991–2022)
- Even Finsrud – percussion (2015–2022)

== Former members ==
- Asgeir Hoel – bass guitar (1980)
- Hallvard Høynes – choir (1980)
- Torbjørn Nicolaysen – bass guitar (1980–1981)
- Bjørn Bogetvedt – choir (1980–1981, guest appearance 2022)
- Bjørn Berg – vocalist (1980–1981, guest appearance 2020 and 2022)
- Espen Røed – bass guitar (1981)
- Rune Endal – bass guitar and double bass (1981–1991, guest appearance 2020 and 2022)
- Viggo Sandvik – trumpet accordion vocalist (1981–2006, guest appearance 2020 and 2022)

== Former live members ==
- Lasse Hafreager – piano and keyboard (1980–1989, guest appearance 2022)
- Tom Berg – saxophone and flute (1988–2008)

Their singer and trumpeter, Viggo Sandvik, quit in January 2006 after being an important band member for 25 years. He was then replaced by 34-year-old Kjetil Foseid.

Besides playing in the band, the drummer, Arnulf Paulsen, a.k.a. "Høgger'n" ("The Chopper"), also runs a wrecking yard and used automotive spare parts shop in Hunndalen, a few miles west of Gjøvik.

== Discography ==
- 1980: 24 timers service
- 1981: Slitin i knea
- 1982: Blålys
- 1983: På tur
- 1984: Fem fyrer med ved
- 1985: 5 års jubileum
- 1986: Musikk tel arbe
- 1987: Gå for gull
- 1989: Tempo
- 1990: Full behandling
- 1992: 11 år uten kvinnfolk
- 1994: Rock-a-doodle
- 1994: Gammel Oppland
- 1996: Hææærli' på toppen ta væla
- 2000: Hjulkalender
- 2005: Bedre hell' all medisin!
- 2007: Bensin på bålet!

== Allusions ==
- The album Gammel Oppland is named after a Norwegian aquavit by the same name. The original cover of the record was a mock-up of the beverage's Gammel Oppland's label, but was later changed, due to protests.
- The cover of their album Hææærli' på toppen ta væla is a mock-up of the cover of The Beatles' album Sgt. Pepper's Lonely Hearts Club Band.
