= Cato Hamre Andersen =

Norwegian ice hockey player

Personal information
- Born: 10 June 1959 (age 67) Oslo, Norway

Sport
- Sport: Ice hockey

Cato Hamre Andersen (born 10 June 1959) is a Norwegian former ice hockey player. He was born in Oslo. He played for the Norwegian national ice hockey team at the 1984 Winter Olympics.
