= IL Manglerud Star =

Sports club in Oslo, Norway

- Full name: Idrettslaget Manglerud Star
- Founded: 1913

Idrettslaget Manglerud Star is a Norwegian alliance sports club from Manglerud, Oslo. It has sections for association football (one for elite and one for grassroots football) and ice hockey.

== General history ==
The club was founded in 1964 as a merger between SK Star (founded 1913) and Manglerud IL. The club counts 1913 as its founding date. The club colors are green.

== Ice hockey ==
Manglerud Star Ishockey is the name of the ice hockey section. It has played in the highest Norwegian league. The home arena is Manglerudhallen.

== Manglerud Star Toppfotball ==
Manglerud Star Toppfotball is the name of the top-level football section. It consists of a men's and women's senior team, and reserves teams for men and women. The men's team currently plays in the Norwegian Second Division, but played in the First Division when it formerly cooperated to form the team FK Oslo Øst. The women's team plays in the First Division, the second tier. The men's and women's reserves team both play in the Third Division.

== Grassroots football ==
The "grassroots football" (Norwegian: breddefotball) section of the club goes by the name Manglerud Star Fotball. A senior men's team (bearing no relation to Manglerud Star Toppfotball) currently plays in the Seventh Division, the eighth tier of Norwegian football. A reserves team and a "third team" both play in the eighth division.

== Other sports ==
The club formerly fielded a team in rink bandy. The women's team won the national championships in 1985, edging out Hasle-Løren IL.
