= Hans Rotmo =

Norwegian singer and songwriter (1948–2024)

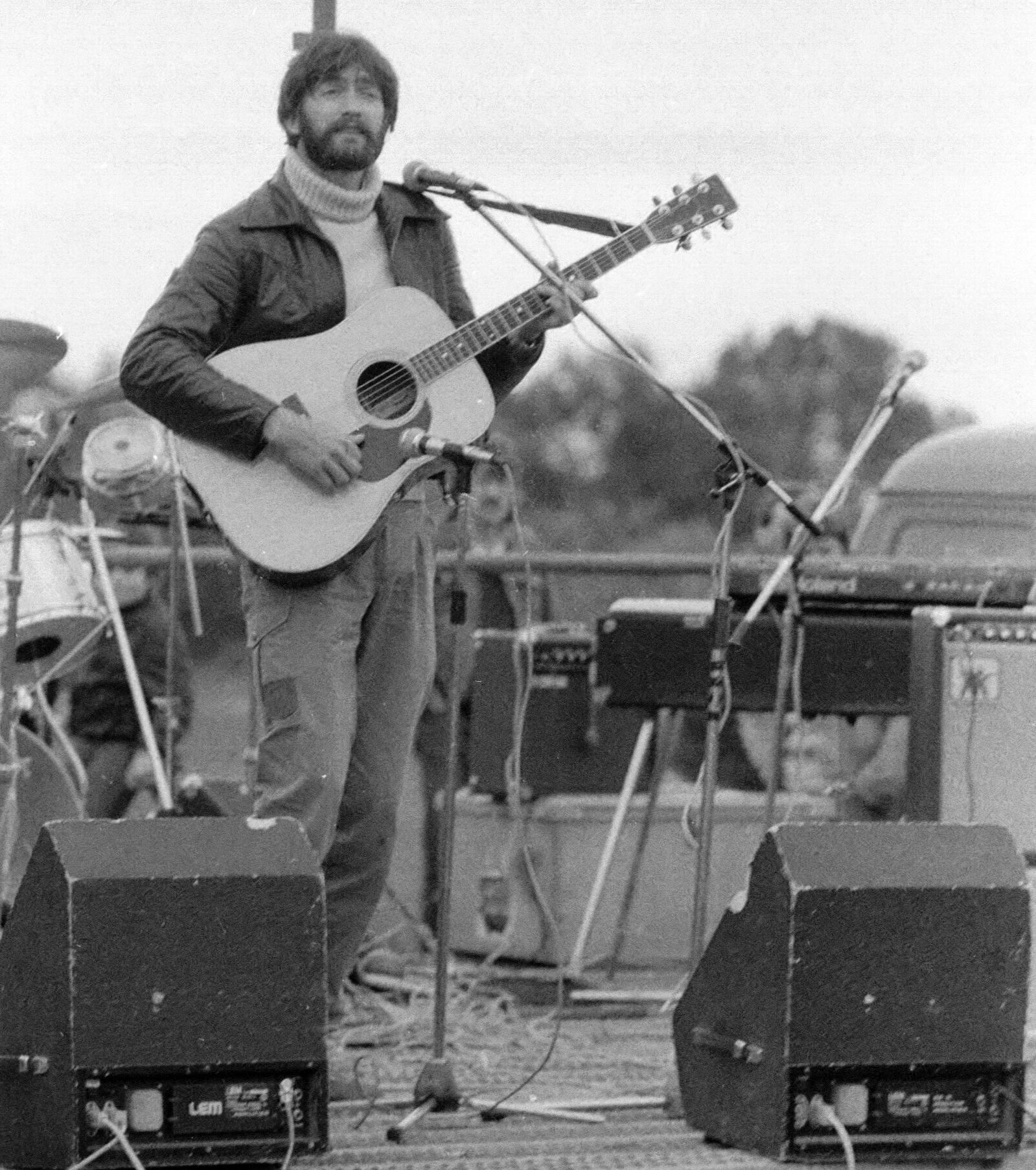
- Rotmo during the Feginsfestival in Trondheim 1982 (Photo: Idar Lind)
- Born: 10 March 1948; Verdal Municipality, Norway
- Died: 24 October 2024 (aged 76)
- Occupation(s): Singer, songwriter

Hans Per Rotmo (10 March 1948 – 24 October 2024) was a Norwegian singer and songwriter, known by most Norwegians as the leading figure of 1970s folk-rock band Vømmøl Spellmannslag, and also known as the writer of hit songs like "Fire fine lænestola" and the Christmas tune "Vårres jul". Rotmo sang in his own dialect, from Verdal Municipality.

Rotmo was a supporter of the revolutionary communist movement AKP(m-l) in his younger years, and many of the lyrics of his songs, especially those from the Vømmøl period, are influenced by the thoughts of Mao Zedong and Karl Marx, although the surface content of most of these songs concern the population of rural Norway, the industrial progress that followed World War II, and the effects of the latter on the former.

== Personal life and death ==
Born in Verdal Municipality on 10 March 1948, Rotmo was a son of merchants Peder Aksel Rotmo and Hjørdis Aasander. He was first married to Anne Lise Olsen, and from 1986 to actress Hege Rohde. He graduated as cand.mag. in history from the University of Oslo in 1973.

Rotmo died from cancer on 24 October 2024, at the age of 76.
