= 1958 (film) =

- Directed by: Oddvar Bull Tuhus
- Written by: Jan H. Jensen; Tore Torell
- Starring: Rune Dybedahl; Cecilie Holter; Øyvind Janeschitz
- Release date: 22 August 1980
- Running time: 96 minutes
- Country: Norway
- Language: Norwegian

1958 is a Norwegian 1980 drama film directed by Oddvar Bull Tuhus, starring Rune Dybedahl and Cecilie Holter. It takes place in the year 1958, and deals with a group of teenagers in Sinsen, Oslo.
