= 1995–96 Eliteserien season =

Norwegian ice hockey season

The 1995–96 Eliteserien season was the 57th season of ice hockey in Norway. Eight teams participated in the league, and Storhamar Ishockey won the championship.

== Regular season ==
	Club	GP	W	T	L	GF–GA	Pts
1.	Vålerenga Ishockey	28	21	0	7	135:86	42
2.	Stjernen	28	19	2	7	140:94	40
3.	Storhamar Ishockey	28	20	0	8	128:56	40
4.	Spektrum Flyers	28	18	1	9	132:90	37
5.	Lillehammer IK	28	13	2	13	101:101	28
6.	Trondheim IK	28	8	2	18	87:108	18
7.	Frisk Asker	28	5	1	22	69:154	11
8.	Viking IK	28	3	2	23	90:193	8

Source: Elite Prospects

== Playoff Qualification ==
=== Group A ===
	Club	GP	W	T	L	GF–GA	Pts
1.	Storhamar Ishockey	4	4	0	0	19:8	8
2.	Vålerenga Ishockey	4	2	0	2	15:15	4
3.	Trondheim IK	4	0	0	4	9:20	0

=== Group B ===
	Club	GP	W	T	L	GF–GA	Pts
1.	Stjernen	4	3	0	1	18:16	6
2.	Lillehammer IK	4	2	0	2	16:17	4
3.	Spektrum Flyers	4	1	0	3	14:15	2

== Playoffs ==
Semi-finals
Stjernen	0
Vålerenga Ishockey	3
Storhamar Ishockey	3
Lillehammer IK	0

Final
Vålerenga Ishockey	0
Storhamar Ishockey	3
Third place
not played

== Relegation ==
=== Group A ===
	Club	GP	W	T	L	GF–GA	Pts
1.	Frisk Asker	4	3	1	0	21:11	7
2.	Hasle-Løren Idrettslag	4	2	0	2	18:16	4
3.	IK Comet	4	0	1	3	10:22	1

=== Group B ===
	Club	GP	W	T	L	GF–GA	Pts
1.	Viking IK	4	3	0	1	22:14	6
2.	Lørenskog IK	4	2	0	2	14:19	4
3.	Furuset IF	4	1	0	3	14:17	2
