= Manglerud Star Ishockey =

Norwegian ice hockey club

Manglerud Star
- City: Oslo, Norway
- League: 2. divisjon
- Founded: 1967; 59 years ago
- Home arena: Manglerudhallen
- Colors: Green, yellow and white
- General manager: Bjørn Danielsen
- Head coach: David Livingston
- Affiliate: Furuset Ishockey (1. div)
- Website: mshockey.no

Franchise history
- 1967-1989: IL Manglerud/Star
- 1989-1990: Oslo Hockey
- 1990-1991: LM-90
- 1991-1994: Manglerud Star
- 1994-1996: Spektrum Flyers
- 1996-present: Manglerud Star

Championships
- Playoff championships: 1977, 1978

Manglerud Star Ishockey, commonly known as Manglerud Star and abbreviated as MS, is a Norwegian ice hockey team based in Oslo, Norway. They currently play in the 2. divisjon, after replacing the bankrupt Rosenborg IHK in the summer of 2014.

Manglerud Star was founded in 1967 and was promoted to the top division in 1973. The club enjoyed a spell of success in the late 1970s, winning two national championships, to date the club's only trophies. In modern times, the club is still widely regarded to have one of the best youth academies in Norwegian hockey. Manglerud play their home games at Manglerudhallen.

== History ==
The multi-sports club SK Star was founded on 23 June 1913 at Akershus Festning in Oslo. In 1964, the club merged with Manglerud IL, to form Manglerud Star IL. The ice hockey division became active three years later. The first, and to date only, titles would come in the late 70s, with the club winning the national championships in 1977 and 1978. The 90s would be an unstable decade for Manglerud, with the club unsuccessfully attempting mergers with other Oslo-based clubs, most notably with Furuset to create Spektrum Flyers.

In the 2004/05 season, Manglerud Star was relegated from the top flight due to financial problems. After spending four season on the second tier, Manglerud finally qualified for GET-ligaen again for the 2009/10 season. The club was relegated again following the 2011/12 season, but regained the top flight spot following Rosenborg IHKs bankruptcy in the summer of 2014.

Manglerud has delivered more players to professional ice hockey leagues around the world than any other hockey team in Norway. In 2004, the city of Oslo provided funding for a renovation of Manglerudhallen, which also includes a football arena beside the hockey rink.

== Season-by-season results ==
This is a partial list of the last ten seasons completed by Manglerud Star. For the full season-by-season history, see List of Manglerud Star Ishockey seasons.

Norwegian Champions	Regular Season Champions	Promoted	Relegated

Season	League	Regular season									Postseason
Season	League	GP	W	L	OTW	OTL	GF	GA	Pts	Finish	Postseason
2013–14	1. divisjon	36	31	4	1	0	194	45	95	1st	3rd in Qualifying for Eliteserien^{1}
2014–15	Eliteserien	45	4	34	3	4	82	206	22	9th	1st in Qualifying for Eliteserien
2015–16	Eliteserien	45	11	27	3	4	109	175	43	8th	Lost in Quarter-finals, 0–4 (Stavanger)
2016–17	Eliteserien	45	12	24	8	1	100	148	53	9th	1st in Qualifying for Eliteserien
2017–18	Eliteserien	45	15	21	4	5	132	154	58	7th	Lost in Quarter-finals, 2–4 (Sparta)
2018–19	Eliteserien	48	9	32	4	3	102	171	38	7th	Lost in Quarter-finals, 1–4 (Vålerenga)
2019–20	Eliteserien	45	15	26	3	1	112	148	49	8th	Cancelled due to the COVID-19 pandemic
2020–21	Eliteserien	22	6	13	1	2	62	96	22	8th	Cancelled due to the COVID-19 pandemic
2021–22	Eliteserien	44	3	35	2	4	78	196	17	10th	1st in Qualifying for Eliteserien
2022–23	Eliteserien	45	10	31	1	3	92	192	35	8th	Lost in Quarter-finals, 0–4 (Storhamar)

^{1} Rosenborg failed to renew its professional license to play in the GET-liga. The vacant spot was given to Manglerud Star.

== Retired numbers ==
Retired numbers
No.	Player	Position	Career	Number retirement
1	Jørn Goldstein	G	1972–1980, 1981–1985	2014
7	Trond Abrahamsen	D	1979-1989	2014
8	Rune Molberg	D	1967–1982	2014
9	Roar Øvstedal	LW	1975–1985	2014
10	Kjell Thorkildsen	FW	1967–1988	2014
13	Tom Røymark	RW	1975–1985	2014
23	Mats Trygg	D	1994–1999	2014

== See also ==
- IL Manglerud Star
- Manglerud Star Toppfotball
