= 50/50 (1982 film) =

Norwegian drama film by Oddvar Bull Tuhus

- Directed by: Oddvar Bull Tuhus
- Written by: Oddvar Bull Tuhus; Rolv Håan
- Starring: Steinar Raaen; Rune Dybedahl; Øyvind Janeschitz; Pia Borgli
- Release date: 1982
- Running time: 87 minutes
- Country: Norway
- Language: Norwegian

50/50, also known as Fifty Fifty, is a 1982 Norwegian drama film directed by Oddvar Bull Tuhus, starring Steinar Raaen and Rune Dybedahl. A group of kids who have just graduated from school find working life tiresome. They decide to get their old band back together, and go on a tour.
