= 1978–79 Minnesota Golden Gophers men's ice hockey season =

National champion Big Ten, champion WCHA tournament, co-champion NCAA tournament, champion
- Conference: 2nd WCHA; 1st Big Ten
- Home ice: Williams Arena

Record
- Overall: 32–11–1
- Conference: 20–11–1 / 10–2
- Home: 20–4–1
- Road: 9–7–0
- Neutral: 3–0–0

Coaches and captains
- Head coach: Herb Brooks
- Assistant coaches: Brad Buetow; John Perpich; Mike Foley
- Captain: Bill Baker
- Alternate captain(s): Phil Verchota; Steve Christoff

The 1978–79 Minnesota Golden Gophers men's ice hockey team represented the University of Minnesota in college ice hockey. In its 7th year under head coach Herb Brooks the team compiled a 32–11–1 record and reached the NCAA tournament for the eighth time. The Golden Gophers defeated North Dakota 4–3 in the championship game at the Olympia Stadium in Detroit, Michigan to win their third national championship.

== Season ==
=== Early lead ===
Minnesota began the 1978–79 season well, winning two games before each of their losses through mid-November. Steve Janaszak, one of the four remaining players from Minnesota's last national championship team, received the lion's share of minutes in goal as the Gophers built an early lead in both the WCHA and Big Ten. After the calendar had turned to December, Minnesota visited a resurgent North Dakota who had already climbed up to second place in the conference. The teams split the series and Minnesota headed home with an 11–4 record.

The Gophers played host to three ECAC Hockey teams during the winter break and though Harvard gave them a good game, Minnesota swept both weekend to build their record to 15–4. When the Gophers returned to conference play they throttled Michigan with Janaszak posting his only shutout of the season. That dominance likely led to a bit of soft play the following weekend when the Gopher's didn't show up against Minnesota–Duluth and the squad played its first weekend all season without recording a win.

=== Trouble on the road ===
After the failed homestand Minnesota spent the following two weekends outside of Minnesota. The first series against Wisconsin began well but the Badgers salvaged a split in the second game. The Gophers then headed southwest to play Denver and lost both games to a middling Pioneer squad. With their conference record dented, Minnesota returned to the Williams Arena and hosted two weak teams over two weeks, easily winning four games, before ending up in Notre Dame where they lost two close affairs. The pair of losses were at an inopportune time because it allowed North Dakota to build a 5-point lead in the WCHA race.

While the two teams would play to end the season Minnesota needed help from a bad Michigan State team who were fighting just to make the conference tournament. Before they could worry about that, however, they had to take care of business at home against Michigan Tech. The Gophers won both of their games and watched as the Fighting Sioux lost on Saturday to give Minnesota a chance at the conference title. The next weekend Minnesota opened with a 5–2 win over North Dakota but could not keep the momentum going and failed to win the crown after losing the second game.

=== WCHA tournament ===
With their second-place finish Minnesota was guaranteed home ice for the conference playoffs. After breezing through the first round against Michigan Tech, Minnesota hosted Minnesota–Duluth, one of only two team to have a winning record against the Golden Gophers in the regular season. Minnesota fought valiantly in the first game with Janaszak turning aside all but one shot from a potent Bulldog attack. Minnesota pulled away in the second game, scoring six times, and captured their sixth WCHA tournament title.

=== NCAA tournament ===
While the Gophers earned one of the two WCHA bids, the other went to North Dakota and because the Fighting Sioux had finished the regular season with a better conference record, Minnesota was slotted into the second western seed. Because of this Minnesota was forced to begin the tournament against CCHA champion Bowling Green who had proven the year before that they could compete on a national stage. Minnesota proved the stronger team, however, winning the first round match 6–3 and punching their ticket to Detroit.

In the semifinals Minnesota met New Hampshire, the top offence team in the east, and the two battled a close contest for 60 minutes with the Gophers ending up as the victors. In the championship game Minnesota faced UND for the seventh time that season. The Fighting Sioux elected to start senior Bill Stankoven over freshman Bob Iwabuchi despite the underclassmen's superior numbers. That choice did not pan out as the Gophers scored three times in the first period and took a 2-goal lead into the second. Iwabuchi found himself in goal from the remainder of the contest but the Fighting Sioux had a tough hill to climb. Janaszak played strong throughout the game but couldn't stop North Dakota from cutting into the lead with a late second period goal. Neal Broten restored the two goal advantage less than three minutes into the third but UND narrowed the gap back to 1 with just over ten minutes to play. The two teams fought desperately in the final half-period but neither side was able to score and Minnesota earned their third national title in only 6 years.

=== Awards and honors ===
For his superlative play in the three games, Steve Janaszak was named Tournament MOP and was on the All-Tournament Team with teammates Mike Ramsey, Steve Christoff and Eric Strobel. Defenseman Bill Baker was the team's sole representative on the AHCA All-American West Team and the All-WCHA First Team while team scoring leader Steve Christoff made the WCHA Second Team.

The 1978–79 Minnesota team joined the 1948–49 Boston College Eagles as the only teams to win a championship with all of their players having been born in one state or province and was the second time Minnesota had won a championship with only American players. Two Gophers were taken in the 1979 NHL entry draft with both (Mike Ramsey and Neal Broten) becoming All-Stars.

Head Coach Herb Brooks would leave Minnesota that summer when he signed on to serve as the bench boss for the US National Team at the 1980 Winter Olympics. Unsurprisingly, Brooks drew heavily from the program he ran for seven season with 8 of 20 players coming from the 1979 championship team: Bill Baker, Neal Broten, Steve Christoff, Steve Janaszak, Rob McClanahan, Mike Ramsey, Eric Strobel and Phil Verchota.

== Standings ==
1978–79 Western Collegiate Hockey Association standings
	Conference							Overall					
	GP	W	L	T	PTS	GF	GA	GP	W	L	T	GF	GA
North Dakota†*	32	22	10	0	44	168	110	42	30	11	1	245	144
Minnesota*	32	20	11	1	41	177	116	44	32	11	1	239	147
Minnesota-Duluth	32	18	10	4	40	176	141	40	22	14	4	213	170
Wisconsin	32	19	11	2	40	164	138	41	25	13	3	215	172
Notre Dame	32	17	14	1	35	161	153	38	18	19	1	184	196
Denver	32	14	16	2	30	147	174	43	20	20	3	188	217
Michigan Tech	32	13	16	3	29	152	141	38	17	18	3	182	165
Colorado College	32	11	19	2	24	144	185	38	12	24	2	165	218
Michigan State	32	12	20	0	24	122	180	36	15	21	0	140	192
Michigan	32	6	25	1	13	117	190	36	8	27	1	132	210
Championship: Minnesota, North Dakota † indicates conference regular season champion * indicates conference tournament champion

1978–79 Big Ten standings
	Conference							Overall					
	GP	W	L	T	PTS	GF	GA	GP	W	L	T	GF	GA
Minnesota†	12	10	2	0	20	80	43	44	32	11	1	239	147
Wisconsin	12	8	4	0	16	73	50	41	25	13	3	215	172
Michigan	12	3	9	0	6	43	75	36	8	27	1	132	210
Michigan State	12	3	9	0	6	46	77	36	15	21	0	140	192
† indicates conference regular season champion

== Schedule ==
Date	Opponent^{#}	Rank^{#}	Site	Result	Record
Exhibition
October 20	vs. North Dakota*		Minot, North Dakota (Exhibition)	W 6–5	
Regular season
October 21	vs. North Dakota*		Eveleth Hippodrome • Eveleth, Minnesota (US Hockey Hall of Fame Game)	W 5–3	1–0
October 28	vs. Wisconsin		Williams Arena • Minneapolis, Minnesota	W 8–4	2–0 (1–0 / 1–0)
October 29	vs. Wisconsin		Williams Arena • Minneapolis, Minnesota	L 5–9	3–0 (1–1 / 1–1)
November 3	at Michigan State		Munn Ice Arena • East Lansing, Michigan	W 6–4	3–1 (2–1 / 2–1)
November 4	at Michigan State		Munn Ice Arena • East Lansing, Michigan	W 6–5 ^{OT}	4–1 (3–1 / 3–1)
November 10	vs. Notre Dame		Williams Arena • Minneapolis, Minnesota	L 2–3	4–2 (3–2 / 3–1)
November 11	vs. Notre Dame		Williams Arena • Minneapolis, Minnesota	W 4–1	5–2 (4–2 / 3–1)
November 17	at Minnesota–Duluth		Duluth Arena Auditorium • Duluth, Minnesota	W 5–4 ^{OT}	6–2 (5–2 / 3–1)
November 18	at Minnesota–Duluth		Duluth Arena Auditorium • Duluth, Minnesota	L 4–5	6–3 (5–3 / 3–1)
November 24	at Colorado College		Broadmoor World Arena • Colorado Springs, Colorado	W 8–3	7–3 (6–3 / 3–1)
November 25	at Colorado College		Broadmoor World Arena • Colorado Springs, Colorado	W 8–3	8–3 (7–3 / 3–1)
December 2	vs. Michigan		Williams Arena • Minneapolis, Minnesota	W 8–2	9–3 (8–3 / 4–1)
December 3	vs. Michigan		Williams Arena • Minneapolis, Minnesota	W 10–5	10–3 (9–3 / 5–1)
December 15	at North Dakota		Winter Sports Center • Grand Forks, North Dakota	L 1–4	10–4 (9–4 / 5–1)
December 16	at North Dakota		Winter Sports Center • Grand Forks, North Dakota	W 6–3	11–4 (10–4 / 5–1)
December 22	vs. Princeton*		Williams Arena • Minneapolis, Minnesota	W 6–2	12–4 (10–4 / 5–1)
December 23	vs. Princeton*		Williams Arena • Minneapolis, Minnesota	W 6–2	13–4 (10–4 / 5–1)
December 27	vs. Harvard*		Williams Arena • Minneapolis, Minnesota	W 5–4	14–4 (10–4 / 5–1)
December 28	vs. Yale*		Williams Arena • Minneapolis, Minnesota	W 7–3	15–4 (10–4 / 5–1)
January 5	at Michigan		Yost Ice Arena • Ann Arbor, Michigan	W 10–1	16–4 (11–4 / 6–1)
January 6	at Michigan		Yost Ice Arena • Ann Arbor, Michigan	W 3–0	17–4 (12–4 / 7–1)
January 12	vs. Minnesota–Duluth		Williams Arena • Minneapolis, Minnesota	T 6–6 ^{OT}	17–4–1 (12–4–1 / 7–1)
January 13	vs. Minnesota–Duluth		Williams Arena • Minneapolis, Minnesota	L 1–6	17–5–1 (12–5–1 / 7–1)
January 19	at Wisconsin		Dane County Coliseum • Madison, Wisconsin	W 3–2	18–5–1 (13–5–1 / 8–1)
January 20	at Wisconsin		Dane County Coliseum • Madison, Wisconsin	L 3–4	18–6–1 (13–6–1 / 8–2)
January 26	at Denver		DU Arena • Denver, Colorado	L 4–5	18–7–1 (13–7–1 / 8–2)
January 27	at Denver		DU Arena • Denver, Colorado	L 2–4	18–8–1 (13–8–1 / 8–2)
February 2	vs. Michigan State		Williams Arena • Minneapolis, Minnesota	W 7–4	19–8–1 (14–8–1 / 9–2)
February 3	vs. Michigan State		Williams Arena • Minneapolis, Minnesota	W 11–3	20–8–1 (15–8–1 / 10–2)
February 10	vs. Colorado College		Williams Arena • Minneapolis, Minnesota	W 8–5	21–8–1 (16–8–1 / 10–2)
February 11	vs. Colorado College		Williams Arena • Minneapolis, Minnesota	W 9–2	22–8–1 (17–8–1 / 10–2)
February 16	at Notre Dame		Athletic & Convocation Center • Notre Dame, Indiana	L 2–3	22–9–1 (17–9–1 / 10–2)
February 17	at Notre Dame		Athletic & Convocation Center • Notre Dame, Indiana	L 7–8	22–10–1 (17–10–1 / 10–2)
February 23	vs. Michigan Tech		Williams Arena • Minneapolis, Minnesota	W 6–2	23–10–1 (18–10–1 / 10–2)
February 24	vs. Michigan Tech		Williams Arena • Minneapolis, Minnesota	W 7–3	24–10–1 (19–10–1 / 10–2)
March 2	vs. North Dakota		Williams Arena • Minneapolis, Minnesota	W 5–2	25–10–1 (20–10–1 / 10–2)
March 3	vs. North Dakota		Williams Arena • Minneapolis, Minnesota	L 2–4	25–11–1 (20–11–1 / 10–2)
WCHA tournament
March 6	vs. Michigan Tech*		Williams Arena • Minneapolis, Minnesota (WCHA First Round Game 1)	W 5–3	26–11–1 (20–11–1 / 10–2)
March 7	vs. Michigan Tech*		Williams Arena • Minneapolis, Minnesota (WCHA First Round Game 2)	W 6–1	27–11–1 (20–11–1 / 10–2)
Minnesota Wins Series 11-4
March 10	at Minnesota–Duluth*		Williams Arena • Minneapolis, Minnesota (WCHA Second Round Game 1)	W 2–1	28–11–1 (20–11–1 / 10–2)
March 11	at Minnesota–Duluth*		Williams Arena • Minneapolis, Minnesota (WCHA Second Round Game 2)	W 6–3	29–11–1 (20–11–1 / 10–2)
Minnesota Wins Series 8-4
NCAA tournament
March 18	vs. Bowling Green*		Williams Arena • Minneapolis, Minnesota (First Round)	W 6–3	30–11–1 (20–11–1 / 10–2)
March 22	vs. New Hampshire*		Olympia Stadium • Detroit, Michigan (National Semifinal)	W 4–3	31–11–1 (20–11–1 / 10–2)
March 23	vs. North Dakota*		Olympia Stadium • Detroit, Michigan (National championship)	W 4–3	32–11–1 (20–11–1 / 10–2)
*Non-conference game. ^{#}Rankings from USCHO.com Poll. Source:

== Roster and scoring statistics ==
No.	Player	Year	Position	Hometown	S/P/C	Games	Goals	Assists	Points	PIM
11	Steve Christoff	Junior	C	Richfield, MN	(Minnesota)	43	38	39	77	50
17	Don Micheletti	Junior	LW	Hibbing, MN	(Minnesota)	41	36	36	72	112
14	Neal Broten	Freshman	C	Roseau, MN	(Minnesota)	40	21	50	71	18
6	Bill Baker	Senior	D	Grand Rapids, MN	(Minnesota)	44	12	42	54	38
9	Tim Harrer	Junior	RW	Bloomington, MN	(Minnesota)	43	28	25	53	38
10	Eric Strobel	Junior	RW	Rochester, MN	(Minnesota)	44	30	22	52	34
7	Rob McClanahan	Junior	LW	Saint Paul, MN	(Minnesota)	43	17	32	49	34
12	Phil Verchota	Senior	LW	Duluth, MN	(Minnesota)	44	18	24	42	52
21	Bart Larson	Freshman	D / LW	Bloomington, MN	(Minnesota)	44	9	33	42	4
18	Steve Ulseth	Sophomore	LW	Roseville, MN	(Minnesota)	37	8	18	26	12
4	Mike Ramsey	Freshman	D	Minneapolis, MN	(Minnesota)	34	7	17	24	38
28	Mike Greeder	Sophomore	D	Mahtomedi, MN	(Minnesota)	40	2	12	14	60
24	Bob Bergloff	Sophomore	D	Bloomington, MN	(Minnesota)	37	1	11	12	48
5	Joe Baker	Senior	D	White Bear Lake, MN	(Minnesota)	22	0	10	10	40
23	John Meredith	Junior	RW	Minneapolis, MN	(Minnesota)	32	2	7	9	9
3	Steve Pepper	Sophomore	D	Edina, MN	(Minnesota)	34	2	5	7	18
20	Jeff Teal	Freshman	LW	Rochester, MN	(Minnesota)	39	2	4	6	12
15	Dave Terwilliger	Sophomore	D	Edina, MN	(Minnesota)	37	1	4	5	18
19	Kevin Hartzell	Freshman	F	Saint Paul, MN	(Minnesota)	20	2	2	4	0
22	Bradley Doshan	Sophomore	D	Hastings, MN	(Minnesota)	25	0	4	4	12
29	Jay Larson	Freshman	D	Minneapolis, MN	(Minnesota)	10	1	2	3	4
2	Peter Hayek	Junior	D / LW	Robbinsdale, MN	(Minnesota)	7	0	3	3	4
25	Brian Zins	Freshman	D	Hoyt Lakes, MN	(Minnesota)	5	1	0	1	2
26	Wayne Larson	Sophomore	C	Minneapolis, MN	(Minnesota)	9	1	0	1	2
30	Jim Jetland	Freshman	G	Grand Rapids, MN	(Minnesota)	4	-	-	-	-
1	Steve Janaszak	Senior	G	Saint Paul, MN	(Minnesota)	40	-	-	-	-
Total										

== Goaltending statistics ==
No.	Player	Games	Minutes	Wins	Losses	Ties	Goals against	Saves	Shut outs	SV %	GAA
1	Steve Janaszak	41	2428	29	10	1	131	1116	1	.895	3.23
35	Jim Jetland	4	230	3	1	0	14	111	0	.888	3.68
Total		44		32	11	1	145		1		

== 1979 championship game ==
=== (W1) North Dakota vs. (W2) Minnesota ===
March 24	North Dakota	3 – 4	Minnesota	Olympia Stadium

Scoring summary
Period	Team	Goal	Assist(s)	Time	Score
1st	MIN	Steve Christoff	Verchota	4:11	1–0 MIN
1st	MIN	John Meredith	Strobel and Ulseth	8:05	2–0 MIN
1st	UND	Bill Himmelright – PP	Taylor and Maxwell	17:10	2–1 MIN
1st	MIN	Joe Baker	Micheletti and Broten	19:22	3–1 MIN
2nd	UND	Kevin Maxwell	Eades and Taylor	38:02	3–2 MIN
3rd	MIN	Neal Broten – GW	Christoff and Larson	42:48	4–2 MIN
3rd	UND	Marc Chorney	Burggraf and Taylor	49:56	4–3 MIN

Shots by period
Team	1	2	3	T
Minnesota	16	8	11	35
North Dakota	9	11	8	28

Goaltenders
Team	Name	Saves	Goals against	Time on ice
MIN	Steve Janaszak	25	3	
UND	Bill Stankoven	13	3	
UND	Bob Iwabuchi	17	1	

== Players drafted into the NHL ==
=== 1979 NHL entry draft ===
= NHL All-Star team	= NHL All-Star	= NHL All-Star and NHL All-Star team	= Did not play in the NHL

Round	Pick	Player	NHL team
1	11	Mike Ramsey	Buffalo Sabres
3	42	Neal Broten	Minnesota North Stars
