= Minnesota Golden Gophers men's ice hockey statistical leaders =

The Minnesota Golden Gophers men's ice hockey statistical leaders are individual statistical leaders of the Minnesota Golden Gophers men's ice hockey program in various categories, including goals, assists, points, and saves. Within those areas, the lists identify single-game, single-season, and career leaders. The Golden Gophers represent the University of Minnesota in the NCAA's Big Ten Conference.

Minnesota began competing in intercollegiate ice hockey in 1921. These lists are updated through the end of the 2020–21 season.

== Goals ==
Career
Rk	Player	Goals	Seasons
1	John Mayasich	144	1951–52 1952–53 1953–54 1954–55
2	Pat Micheletti	120	1982–83 1983–84 1984–85 1985–86
3	Corey Millen	119	1982–83 1984–85 1985–86 1986–87
4	Tim Harrer	117	1976–77 1977–78 1978–79 1979–80
5	Butsy Erickson	109	1979–80 1980–81 1981–82 1982–83
	Dick Dougherty	109	1950–51 1951–52 1952–53 1953–54
7	Brian Bonin	100	1992–93 1993–94 1994–95 1995–96
8	Scott Bjugstad	86	1979–80 1980–81 1981–82 1982–83
9	Steve Ulseth	84	1977–78 1978–79 1979–80 1980–81
10	Troy Riddle	82	2000–01 2001–02 2002–03 2003–04
	Peter Hankinson	82	1986–87 1987–88 1988–89 1989–90

Season
Rk	Player	Goals	Season
1	Tim Harrer	53	1979–80
2	Pat Micheletti	48	1984–85
3	Aaron Broten	47	1980–81
4	Scott Bjugstad	43	1982–83
5	Dick Dougherty	42	1953–54
	John Mayasich	42	1952–53
7	Corey Millen	41	1985–86
	Steve Ulseth	41	1980–81
	John Mayasich	41	1954–55

Single Game
Rk	Player	Goals	Season	Opponent
1	John Mayasich	6	1954–55	Winnipeg

== Assists ==
Career
Rk	Player	Assists	Seasons
1	Larry Olimb	159	1988–89 1989–90 1990–91 1991–92
2	John Mayasich	154	1951–52 1952–53 1953–54 1954–55
3	Pat Micheletti	149	1982–83 1983–84 1984–85 1985–86
4	Butsy Erickson	129	1979–80 1980–81 1981–82 1982–83
5	John Pohl	128	1998–99 1999–00 2000–01 2001–02
	Todd Richards	128	1985–86 1986–87 1987–88 1988–89
7	Corey Millen	122	1982–83 1984–85 1985–86 1986–87
8	Mike Crowley	120	1994–95 1995–96 1996–97
9	Steve Ulseth	118	1977–78 1978–79 1979–80 1980–81
10	Brian Bonin	116	1992–93 1993–94 1994–95 1995–96

Season
Rk	Player	Assists	Season
1	Aaron Broten	59	1980–81
2	Larry Olimb	56	1991–92
3	Neal Broten	54	1980–81
4	John Pohl	52	2001–02
	Steve Ulseth	52	1980–81
6	Neal Broten	50	1978–79
7	John Mayasich	49	1953–54
8	Scott Bjugstad	48	1982–83
	Pat Micheletti	48	1985–86
10	Brian Bonin	47	1995–96
	Butsy Erickson	47	1982–83

Single Game
Rk	Player	Assists	Season	Opponent
1	Brock Faber	5	2020–21	Omaha
	Scott Reedy	5	2020–21	Arizona State
	Gino Guyer	5	2002–03	Mercyhurst
	John Pohl	5	2001–02	Colgate
	Mike Crowley	5	1996–97	Michigan Tech
	Craig Johnson	5	1990–91	Notre Dame
	Corey Millen	5	1985–86	Colorado College
	Tim Bergland	5	1985–86	Colorado College
	Pat Micheletti	5	1985–86	USIU
	Steve Griffith	5	1982–83	Colorado College
	Steve Griffith	5	1982–83	Colorado College
	Neal Broten	5	1980–81	North Dakota
	Scott Lynch	5	1979–80	Brown
	Cal Engelstad	5	1950–51	Michigan Tech

== Points ==
Career
Rk	Player	Points	Seasons
1	John Mayasich	298	1951–52 1952–53 1953–54 1954–55
2	Pat Micheletti	269	1982–83 1983–84 1984–85 1985–86
3	Corey Millen	241	1982–83 1984–85 1985–86 1986–87
4	Butsy Erickson	238	1979–80 1980–81 1981–82 1982–83
5	Larry Olimb	218	1988–89 1989–90 1990–91 1991–92
6	Brian Bonin	216	1992–93 1993–94 1994–95 1995–96
7	Steve Ulseth	202	1977–78 1978–79 1979–80 1980–81
8	Tim Harrer	201	1976–77 1977–78 1978–79 1979–80
9	John Pohl	200	1998–99 1999–00 2000–01 2001–02
10	Dick Dougherty	187	1950–51 1951–52 1952–53 1953–54

Season
Rk	Player	Points	Season
1	Aaron Broten	106	1980–81
2	Pat Micheletti	96	1984–85
3	Steve Ulseth	93	1980–81
4	Scott Bjugstad	91	1982–83
5	Butsy Erickson	86	1980–81
6	Corey Millen	83	1985–86
7	Butsy Erickson	82	1982–83
	Tim Harrer	82	1979–80
9	Brian Bonin	81	1995–96
10	Larry Olimb	80	1991–92
	Pat Micheletti	80	1985–86
	John Mayasich	80	1954–55

Single Game
Rk	Player	Points	Season	Opponent
1	John Mayasich	8	1954–55	Michigan

== Saves ==
Career
Rk	Player	Saves	Seasons
1	Adam Hauser	3,777	1998–99 1999–00 2000–01 2001–02
2	Kellen Briggs	2,968	2003–04 2004–05 2005–06 2006–07
3	Adam Wilcox	2,834	2012–13 2013–14 2014–15
4	Alex Kangas	2,802	2007–08 2008–09 2009–10 2010–11
5	Eric Schierhorn	2,718	2015–16 2016–17 2017–18 2018–19
6	Steve Janaszak	2,639	1975–76 1976–77 1977–78 1978–79
7	Robb Stauber	2,553	1986–87 1987–88 1988–89
8	Murray McLachlan	2,480	1967–68 1968–69 1969–70
9	Justen Close	2,470	2019–20 2020–21 2021–22 2022–23 2023–24
10	Brad Shelstad	2,369	1970–71 1971–72 1972–73 1973–74

Season
Rk	Player	Saves	Season
1	Robb Stauber	1,243	1987–88
2	Steve Janaszak	1,116	1978–79
3	Brad Shelstad	1,075	1973–74
4	Justen Close	1,052	2023–24
5	Adam Hauser	1,044	1999–00
6	Adam Wilcox	1,036	2013–14
7	Eric Schierhorn	984	2016–17
8	Kent Patterson	966	2011–12
9	Adam Hauser	963	1998–99
10	Jeff Callinan	958	1994–95

Single Game
Rk	Player	Saves	Season	Opponent
1	Jeff Tscherne	72	1975–76	Michigan State
