= Peter Hayek =

American ice hockey player

- Born: November 16, 1957 Minneapolis, Minnesota, United States
- Died: 3 December 2021 (aged 64) Robbinsdale, Minnesota, United States
- Height: 5 ft 10 in (178 cm)
- Weight: 200 lb (91 kg; 14 st 4 lb)
- Position: Defense
- Shot: Left
- Played for: Minnesota North Stars
- NHL draft: Undrafted
- Playing career: 1980–1983

Peter Milton Hayek (November 16, 1957 – December 3, 2021) was an American professional ice hockey defenseman who played in one National Hockey League game for the Minnesota North Stars during the 1981–82 season, on December 10, 1981, against the Detroit Red Wings. He played his college hockey at the University of Minnesota under Herb Brooks. He won the 1979 NCAA Championship and was on the roster (JV team) for the 1976 Championship. He later coached youth hockey in Minnesota. Hayek died on December 3, 2021, from dementia.

== Career statistics ==
=== Regular season and playoffs ===
			Regular season					Playoffs
Season	Team	League	GP	G	A	Pts	PIM	GP	G	A	Pts	PIM
1976–77	University of Minnesota	WCHA	32	1	2	3	16	—	—	—	—	—
1977–78	University of Minnesota	WCHA	15	0	0	0	8	—	—	—	—	—
1978–79	University of Minnesota	WCHA	7	0	3	3	4	—	—	—	—	—
1979–80	University of Minnesota	WCHA	41	8	14	22	110	—	—	—	—	—
1979–80	Baltimore Clippers	EHL	—	—	—	—	—	4	0	1	1	6
1980–81	Oklahoma City Stars	CHL	28	5	3	8	16	—	—	—	—	—
1980–81	Baltimore Clippers	EHL	47	18	22	40	55	4	0	1	1	0
1981–82	Minnesota North Stars	NHL	1	0	0	0	0	—	—	—	—	—
1981–82	Nashville South Stars	CHL	68	3	12	15	131	3	1	0	1	4
1982–83	Birmingham South Stars	CHL	14	0	2	2	15	—	—	—	—	—
CHL totals			110	8	17	25	162	3	1	0	1	4
NHL totals			1	0	0	0	0	—	—	—	—	—

== See also ==
- List of players who played only one game in the NHL
