= 1979 NCAA Division I men's ice hockey tournament =

- Teams: 5
- Finals site: Olympia Stadium, Detroit, Michigan
- Champions: Minnesota Golden Gophers (3rd title)
- Runner-up: North Dakota Fighting Sioux (5th title game)
- Semifinalists: Dartmouth Big Green (3rd Frozen Four); New Hampshire Wildcats (2nd Frozen Four)
- Winning coach: Herb Brooks (3rd title)
- MOP: Steve Janaszak (Minnesota)
- Attendance: 13,859

The 1979 NCAA Division I men's ice hockey tournament was the culmination of the 1978–79 NCAA Division I men's ice hockey season, the 32nd such tournament in NCAA history. It was held between March 18 and 24, 1979, and concluded with Minnesota defeating North Dakota 4–3. The first-round game was held at the home team venue while all succeeding games were played at the Olympia Stadium in Detroit, Michigan.

== Qualifying teams ==
The NCAA gave four teams automatic bids into the tournament. The two ECAC teams that reached the ECAC tournament final received bids as did the two WCHA co-champions. The NCAA also had the ability to add up to 4 additional teams as it saw fit and chose to include the CCHA tournament champion as well.

East							West						
Seed	School	Conference	Record	Berth type	Appearance	Last bid	Seed	School	Conference	Record	Berth type	Appearance	Last bid
1	New Hampshire	ECAC Hockey	22–8–3	Tournament champion	2nd	1977	1	North Dakota	WCHA	29–10–1	Tournament co-champion	7th	1968
2	Dartmouth	ECAC Hockey	18–8–2	Tournament finalist	3rd	1949	2	Minnesota	WCHA	29–11–1	Tournament co-champion	8th	1976
							At-Large						
							Seed	School	Conference	Record	Berth type	Appearance	Last bid
							A	Bowling Green	CCHA	37–5–2	Tournament champion	3rd	1978

== Format ==
The four automatic qualifiers were seeded according to pre-tournament finish. The ECAC champion was seeded as the top eastern team while the WCHA co-champion that finished highest in the regular season was given the top western seed. The second eastern seed was slotted to play the top western seed and vice versa. Because an at-large bid was offered to a western school they were placed in a first-round game with the second western seed to determine the final semifinalist. The first-round game was played at the home venue of the second seed while all succeeding games were played at the Olympia in Detroit, Michigan. All matches were Single-game eliminations with the semifinal winners advancing to the national championship game and the losers playing in a consolation game.

== Bracket ==
First Round; March 18
W2	Minnesota	6
A	Bowling Green	3

Semifinals; March 22–23
E1	New Hampshire	3
W2	Minnesota	4
W1	North Dakota	4
E2	Dartmouth	2

National Championship; March 24
W2	Minnesota	4
W1	North Dakota	3
Third Place Game
E1	New Hampshire	3
E2	Dartmouth	7

Note: * denotes overtime period(s)

== Results ==
=== First Round ===
March 18, 1979; 7:30 pm	(W2) Minnesota	6–3 (3–0, 2–2, 1–1)	(A) Bowling Green	Williams Arena; Attendance: 7,940

Game reference

Steve Janaszak
Goalies
Wally Charko
Referees:
Dino Baniccia
Dewey Marcus

(McClanahan, Micheletti) Tim Harrer – 06:36	1 – 0
(Micheletti, McClanahan) Steve Christoff – 09:11	2 – 0
(Micheletti, Harrer) Steve Christoff – 16:16	3 – 0
	3 – 1	24:59 – PP – Bruce Newton (Morrow, Dawe)
	3 – 2	33:46 – Steve Dawe (Douglass)
(Ramsey, Broten) Don Micheletti – GW PP – 35:26	4 – 2
(B. Larson, Teal) Eric Strobel – 37:07	5 – 2
(Micheletti, Ramsey) Tim Harrer – PP – 40:27	6 – 2
	6 – 3	46:44 – Mike Cotter (Crowther, Guertin)

10 min
Penalties
12 min
30
Shots
39

=== Semifinals ===
March 22, 1979; 7:30 pm	(E1) New Hampshire	3–4 (1–3, 1–0, 1–1)	(W2) Minnesota	Olympia Stadium; Attendance: 2,743

Game reference

Greg Moffett
Goalies
Steve Janaszak

	0 – 1	00:35 – Steve Christoff (Broten, Greeder)
	0 – 2	02:10 – Eric Strobel (B. Baker, Ulseth)
(Gould) Bobby Francis – PP – 06:34	1 – 2
	1 – 3	13:48 – PP – Eric Strobel (B. Larson, Ramsey)
(Francis) Ralph Cox – 38:36	2 – 3
	2 – 4	41:53 – GW – Eric Strobel (Greeder)
(McPherson, Crowder) Terry Flanagan – PP – 57:33	3 – 4

14 min
Penalties
18 min
40
Shots
32

March 23, 1979; 7:30 pm	(W1) North Dakota	4–2 (1–1, 2–0, 1–1)	(E2) Dartmouth	Olympia Stadium; Attendance: 4,105

Game reference

Bob Iwabuchi
Goalies
Bob Gaudet
Referees:
Medo Martinello
Jim Quinn

	0 – 1	12:39 – Chip Bettencourt (Hughes, Brownridge)
(Taylor, Burggraf) Howard Walker – SH – 14:55	1 – 1
(Chorney, Stone) Erwin Martens – 29:18	2 – 1
(Eades, Walker) Mark Taylor – GW – 39:21	3 – 1
(Maxwell, Taylor) Cary Eades – PP – 47:38	4 – 1
	4 – 2	54:57 – PP – Dennis Murphy (Hughes, Brownridge)

20 min
Penalties
10 min
32
Shots
25

=== Third Place Game ===
March 24, 1979; 4:00 pm	(E1) New Hampshire	3–7 (2–1, 1–3, 0–3)	(E2) Dartmouth	Olympia Stadium

Game reference

Greg Moffett
Goalies
Bob Gaudet

(Francis, Yantzi) Ralph Cox – 01:27	1 – 0
	1 – 1	04:18 – Rick Mellum (Sosnowski, Higgins)
(Francis, Yantzi) Ralph Cox – 10:46	2 – 1
(McPherson, Holt) Bruce Crowder – 24:05	3 – 1
	3 – 2	26:02 – PP – Mark Culhane (Brownridge, Jangro)
	3 – 3	29:41 – PP – Mark Culhane (Mellum, Hughes)
	3 – 4	33:51 – GW PP – Chip Bettencourt (Murphy)
	3 – 5	42:43 – Buddy Teevens (Ryerson)
	3 – 6	53:02 – Dennis Hughes (Culhane, Higgins)
	3 – 7	54:35 – Mark Bodard (Sosnowski, McLaughlin)

14 min
Penalties
10 min
30
Shots
36

=== National Championship ===
March 24, 1979; 8:00 pm	(W1) North Dakota	3–4 (1–3, 1–0, 1–1)	(W2) Minnesota	Olympia Stadium; Attendance: 7,011

Game reference
Referees: Medo Martinello; John Ricci; Linesman: Dennis Parish

Scoring summary
Period	Team	Goal	Assist(s)	Time	Score
1st	MIN	Steve Christoff	Verchota	4:11	1–0 MIN
1st	MIN	John Meredith	Strobel and Ulseth	8:05	2–0 MIN
1st	UND	Bill Himmelright – PP	Taylor and Maxwell	17:10	2–1 MIN
1st	MIN	Bill Baker	Micheletti and Broten	19:22	3–1 MIN
2nd	UND	Kevin Maxwell	Eades and Taylor	38:02	3–2 MIN
3rd	MIN	Neal Broten – GW	Christoff and Larson	42:48	4–2 MIN
3rd	UND	Marc Chorney	Burggraf and Taylor	49:56	4–3 MIN
Penalty summary
Period	Team	Player	Penalty	Time	PIM
1st	MIN	Rob McClanahan	High-sticking	1:53	2:00
1st	MIN	Mike Ramsey	High-sticking	5:18	2:00
1st	MIN	Don Micheletti	Hooking	9:50	2:00
1st	UND	Mark Taylor	Elbowing	10:50	2:00
1st	MIN	Rob McClanahan	High-sticking	15:23	2:00
1st	UND	Dave Christian	High-sticking	15:23	2:00
1st	MIN	Tim Harrer	Hooking	16:04	2:00
1st	UND	Marc Chorney	Hooking	17:20	2:00
2nd	UND	Charles Burggraf	Hooking	20:25	2:00
2nd	UND	Cary Eades	Slashing	23:33	2:00
2nd	UND	Doug Smail	Charging	38:50	2:00
3rd	UND	Howard Walker	Interference	47:40	2:00

Shots by period
Team	1	2	3	T
Minnesota	16	8	11	35
North Dakota	9	11	8	28

Goaltenders
Team	Name	Saves	Goals against	Time on ice
MIN	Steve Janaszak	25	3	
UND	Bill Stankoven	13	3	20:00
UND	Bob Iwabuchi	17	1	

== All-Tournament team ==
- G: Steve Janaszak* (Minnesota)
- D: Mike Ramsey (Minnesota)
- D: Howard Walker (North Dakota)
- F: Steve Christoff (Minnesota)
- F: Eric Strobel (Minnesota)
- F: Mark Taylor (North Dakota)

* Most Outstanding Player(s)
