= Mike Greeder =

American ice hockey player

- Born: May 1, 1957 Mahtomedi, Minnesota, U.S.
- Died: August 1, 2005 (aged 48) Toledo, Ohio, U.S.
- Height: 6 ft 0 in (183 cm)
- Weight: 194 lb (88 kg; 13 st 12 lb)
- Position: Defense
- Shot: Right
- Played for: Maine Mariners; Fort Worth Texans; Toledo Goaldiggers; Indianapolis Checkers; Salt Lake Golden Eagles; Kalamazoo Wings
- NHL draft: 139th overall, 1977; Philadelphia Flyers
- Playing career: 1979–1987

Michael D. Greeder (May 1, 1957 – August 1, 2005) was an American professional ice hockey player who played in the American Hockey League (AHL), Central Hockey League (CHL), and International Hockey League (IHL). He was drafted by the Philadelphia Flyers in the eighth round of the 1977 NHL amateur draft. He played two years at the University of Minnesota, winning a national title in 1979. Greeder played seven professional seasons and was the captain of the Toledo Goaldiggers when they won the Turner Cup in 1982. He was a junior ice hockey coach following his playing career.

== Career statistics ==
			Regular season					Playoffs
Season	Team	League	GP	G	A	Pts	PIM	GP	G	A	Pts	PIM
1975–76	Gustavus Adolphus College	MIAC	26	12	5	17	91	—	—	—	—	—
1976–77	St. Paul Vulcans	MWJHL	46	23	23	46	166	—	—	—	—	—
1977–78	Minnesota Golden Gophers	WCHA	32	2	8	10	78	—	—	—	—	—
1978–79	Minnesota Golden Gophers	WCHA	40	2	12	14	60	—	—	—	—	—
1979–80	Maine Mariners	AHL	66	3	12	15	105	12	2	1	3	36
1980–81	Maine Mariners	AHL	25	1	1	2	52	8	0	2	2	6
1980–81	Fort Worth Texans	CHL	24	3	6	9	41	—	—	—	—	—
1980–81	Toledo Goaldiggers	IHL	27	6	11	17	68	—	—	—	—	—
1981–82	Toledo Goaldiggers	IHL	76	14	30	44	236	13	0	10	10	33
1982–83	Indianapolis Checkers	CHL	56	9	19	28	127	3	1	2	3	11
1983–84	Indianapolis Checkers	CHL	1	0	0	0	2	—	—	—	—	—
1983–84	Toledo Goaldiggers	IHL	75	10	22	32	250	13	4	3	7	85
1983–84	Salt Lake Golden Eagles	CHL	2	0	0	0	16	—	—	—	—	—
1984–85	Toledo Goaldiggers	IHL	72	3	19	22	314	6	0	0	0	29
1986–87	Kalamazoo Wings	IHL	76	3	12	15	232	5	1	0	1	4
IHL totals			326	36	94	130	1100	37	5	13	18	151
AHL totals			91	4	13	17	157	20	2	3	5	42

== Awards and honors ==
Award	Year	Ref
IHL First All-Star Team	1981–82	
IHL Second All-Star Team	1983–84	
