= Bob Iwabuchi =

Canadian ice hockey player

- Born: June 16, 1957 (age 69) Edmonton, Alberta, Canada
- Height: 5 ft 9 in (175 cm)
- Weight: 160 lb (73 kg; 11 st 6 lb)
- Position: Goaltender
- Played for: North Dakota; Baltimore Clippers
- Playing career: 1978–1981

Robert Kai Iwabuchi is a Canadian retired ice hockey goaltender who was an All-American for North Dakota.

== Career ==
Iwabuchi was recruited to North Dakota by John Gasparini and became a member of his first recruiting class when Gasparini was named head coach in 1978. Iwabuchi had to beat out Bill Stankoven and Mel Donnelly, two veteran Sioux netminders for the starting role. The pressure and excitement of his position caused Iwabuchi to vomit before most games which endeared him to his teammates, some of whom had the same issue. Iwabuchi became a hit as a freshman, helping the team finish atop the WCHA standings, defeating Minnesota in their final game to do so. Iwabuchi finished second in the nation in both goals against average and save percentage and was named as an All-American. He led UND on a run through the conference tournament and made the NCAA Tournament for the first time in eleven years. The Fighting Sioux received the top western seed and downed Dartmouth in the semifinal. In the championship, Stankoven got the start but allowed three goals to the Golden Gophers in the first period. With the team down by 2, Iwabuchi was in goal to start the second and he performed well in relief, turning aside 17 shots. After the team had cut their deficit to 1, Neal Broten scored a one-in-a-million goal over a sliding Iwabuchi to put Minnesota back ahead by 2. UND scored mid-way through the third to get within one again but a post got in the way of a tying goal and UND saw the championship slip away.

Iwabuchi was the starter to begin his sophomore season but his numbers weren't nearly as good. He was eventually replaced as the primary goalie by freshman Darren Jensen and provided capable backup goaltending for the team as it handily won the WCHA regular season crown, the WCHA tournament championship and the NCAA title. Iwabuchi left the program after the year and played with the Baltimore Clippers before retiring as a player.

After returning to the Edmonton area, Iwabuchi began working in with the family business in the food service industry and continued after they had been acquired by Sysco. He worked in the marketing department until his retirement.

== Statistics ==
=== Regular season and playoffs ===
			Regular season									Playoffs
Season	Team	League	GP	W	L	T	MIN	GA	SO	GAA	SV%	GP	W	L	MIN	GA	SO	GAA	SV%
1974–75	Taber Golden Suns	AJHL	20	—	—	—	—	—	—	—	—	—	—	—	—	—	—	—	—
1975–76	Taber Golden Suns	AJHL	29	—	—	—	1693	132	2	4.68	.872	—	—	—	—	—	—	—	—
1976–77	Spruce Grove Mets	AJHL	31	—	—	—	—	—	—	—	—	—	—	—	—	—	—	—	—
1978–79	North Dakota	WCHA	22	—	—	—	1274	61	1	2.74	.907	—	—	—	—	—	—	—	—
1979–80	North Dakota	WCHA	20	—	—	—	—	—	0	3.63	.876	—	—	—	—	—	—	—	—
1980–81	Baltimore Clippers	EHL	36	—	—	—	1791	118	0	3.95	—	—	—	—	—	—	—	—	—
NCAA totals			42	—	—	—	—	—	1	—	—	—	—	—	—	—	—	—	—

== Awards and honors ==
Award	Year
All-WCHA First Team	1978–79
AHCA West All-American	1978–79
