= 1979 CCHA men's ice hockey tournament =

1979 CCHA Men's ice hockey tournament
- Dates: March 2–10, 1979
- Teams: 4
- Finals site: BGSU Ice Arena; Bowling Green, Ohio
- Champions: Bowling Green (4th title)
- Winning coach: Ron Mason (3rd title)
- CCHA Men's Ice Hockey Tournaments

The 1979 CCHA Men's Ice Hockey Tournament was the eighth CCHA Men's Ice Hockey Tournament. It was played between March 2 and March 10, 1979. All games were played at BGSU Ice Arena in Bowling Green, Ohio, the home venue of the Bowling Green Falcons. By winning the tournament, Bowling Green received the Central Collegiate Hockey Association's invitation to play in a first round game created to allow entrance into the tournament for the CCHA.

== Format ==
The tournament featured two rounds of play. Only the top four teams in the conference standings were eligible for postseason play. Each of the two rounds were structured so that the two teams facing one another would play two games and the winner would be decided by the goal differential totals of the combined scores. In the semifinal the first and fourth seeds and the second and third seeds were matched as opponents. The victorious teams would then compete in the finals for the conference championship. The tournament champion was invited to play in a first round game in the 1979 NCAA Division I Men's Ice Hockey Tournament.

== Conference standings ==
Note: GP = Games played; W = Wins; L = Losses; T = Ties; PTS = Points; GF = Goals For; GA = Goals Against

1978–79 Central Collegiate Hockey Association standings
	Conference							Overall					
	GP	W	L	T	PTS	GF	GA	GP	W	L	T	GF	GA
Bowling Green†*	24	21	2	1	43	142	54	45	37	6	2	179	113
Ohio State	24	15	8	1	31	126	101	40	25	13	2	218	170
Northern Michigan	24	13	10	1	27	109	93	34	19	13	2	168	126
Lake Superior State	24	11	12	1	23	118	112	36	16	18	2	164	181
Saint Louis	24	9	13	2	20	104	137	35	16	16	3	174	189
Western Michigan	24	8	16	0	16	116	142	36	17	19	0	171	182
Ferris State‡	24	4	20	0	8	87	163	34	10	24	0	155	217
Championship: Bowling Green † indicates conference regular season champion * indicates conference tournament champion ‡ Ferris State was still considered a member of the NAIA

== Bracket ==
Semifinals; March 2–3
1	Bowling Green	12	6
4	Lake Superior State	1	1
2	Ohio State	5	5****
3	Northern Michigan	5	4

Championship; March 9–10
1	Bowling Green	5	6
3	Ohio State	3	4

Note: * denotes overtime period(s)

=== Semifinals ===
==== (1) Bowling Green vs. (4) Lake Superior State ====
March 2	Bowling Green	12 – 1	Lake Superior State	BGSU Ice Arena

March 3	Bowling Green	6 – 1	Lake Superior State	BGSU Ice Arena

Bowling Green won series 18-2

==== (2) Ohio State vs. (3) Northern Michigan ====
March 2	Ohio State	5 – 5	Northern Michigan	BGSU Ice Arena

March 3	Ohio State	5 – 4	4OT	Northern Michigan	BGSU Ice Arena

Ohio State won series 10-9

=== Championship ===
==== (1) Bowling Green vs. (2) Ohio State ====
March 9	Bowling Green	5 – 3	Ohio State	BGSU Ice Arena

March 10	Bowling Green	6 – 4	Ohio State	BGSU Ice Arena

Bowling Green won series 11-7

== Tournament awards ==
=== MVP ===
- None
