= 1979 ECAC Hockey men's ice hockey tournament =

1979 ECAC Men's ice hockey tournament
- Dates: March 6–10, 1979
- Teams: 8
- Finals site: Boston Garden; Boston, Massachusetts
- Champions: New Hampshire (1st title)
- Winning coach: Charlie Holt (1st title)
- MVP: Greg Moffett (New Hampshire)
- ECAC Men's Ice Hockey Tournaments

The 1979 ECAC Hockey Men's Ice Hockey Tournament was the 18th tournament in league history. It was played between March 6 and March 10, 1979. Quarterfinal games were played at home team campus sites, while the 'final four' games were played at the Boston Garden in Boston, Massachusetts. By reaching the championship game both, New Hampshire and Dartmouth received invitations to participate in the 1979 NCAA Division I Men's Ice Hockey Tournament.

== Format ==
The tournament featured three rounds of play, all of which were single-elimination. The top eight teams, based on winning percentage, qualified to participate in the tournament. In the quarterfinals the first seed and eighth seed, the second seed and seventh seed, the third seed and sixth seed and the fourth seed and fifth seed played against one another. In the semifinals, the highest seed plays the lowest remaining seed while the two remaining teams play with the winners advancing to the championship game and the losers advancing to the third place game.

== Conference standings ==
Note: GP = Games played; W = Wins; L = Losses; T = Ties; Pct. = Winning percentage; GF = Goals for; GA = Goals against

1978–79 ECAC Hockey standings
	Conference							Overall					
	GP	W	L	T	Pct.	GF	GA	GP	W	L	T	GF	GA
Boston University†	23	17	4	2	.783	101	76	30	21	7	2	138	106
New Hampshire*	25	17	5	3	.740	151	103	35	22	10	3	203	148
Cornell	22	16	6	0	.727	129	88	29	21	8	0	166	114
Dartmouth	22	14	7	1	.659	104	78	30	19	9	2	144	102
Clarkson	22	13	9	0	.591	135	106	31	19	12	0	184	136
Providence	24	13	9	2	.583	105	102	28	16	10	2	134	123
Yale	22	12	9	1	.568	105	91	27	13	12	2	129	125
Vermont	21	11	10	0	.524	97	98	30	12	18	0	122	141
Northeastern	22	11	11	0	.500	94	107	27	12	15	0	112	129
Brown	21	10	11	0	.476	86	89	25	11	14	0	105	108
Boston College	22	10	12	0	.455	106	112	30	16	14	0	167	141
Colgate	20	7	13	0	.350	97	124	28	15	13	0	166	144
Rensselaer	25	8	16	1	.340	124	136	28	10	17	1	141	145
Harvard	22	5	16	1	.250	86	109	26	7	18	1	108	131
St. Lawrence	24	5	18	1	.229	81	132	31	8	21	2	118	162
Princeton	21	2	15	4	.190	71	119	26	5	17	4	95	138
Championship: New Hampshire † indicates conference regular season champion * indicates conference tournament champion

== Bracket ==
Teams are reseeded after the first round

Quarterfinals; March 6
1	Boston University	4
8	Vermont	3
2	New Hampshire	9
7	Yale	2
3	Cornell	6*
6	Providence	5
4	Dartmouth	2*
5	Clarkson	1

Semifinals; March 9
1	Boston University	3
4	Dartmouth	5
2	New Hampshire	4
3	Cornell	2

Championship; March 10
2	New Hampshire	3
4	Dartmouth	2
Third Place
1	Boston University	4
3	Cornell	7

Note: * denotes overtime period(s)

=== Quarterfinals ===
==== (1) Boston University vs. (8) Vermont ====
March 6	Boston University	4 – 3	Vermont	Walter Brown Arena

==== (2) New Hampshire vs. (7) Yale ====
March 6	New Hampshire	9 – 2	Yale	Snively Arena

==== (3) Cornell vs. (6) Providence ====
March 6	Cornell	6 – 5	OT	Providence	Lynah Rink

==== (4) Dartmouth vs. (5) Clarkson ====
March 6	Dartmouth	2 – 1	OT	Clarkson	Thompson Arena

=== Semifinals ===
==== (1) Boston University vs. (4) Dartmouth ====
March 9	Boston University	3 – 5	Dartmouth	Boston Garden

==== (2) New Hampshire vs. (3) Cornell ====
March 9	New Hampshire	5 – 2	Cornell	Boston Garden

=== Third Place ===
==== (1) Boston University vs. (3) Cornell ====
March 10	Boston University	4 – 7	Cornell	Boston Garden

=== Championship ===
==== (2) New Hampshire vs. (4) Dartmouth ====
March 10	New Hampshire	3 – 2	Dartmouth	Boston Garden

== Tournament awards ==
=== All-Tournament Team ===
None

=== MOP ===
- Greg Moffett (New Hampshire)
