= Eric Strobel =

American ice hockey player (born 1958)

- Born: June 5, 1958 (age 68) Rochester, Minnesota, U.S.
- Height: 5 ft 10 in (178 cm)
- Weight: 175 lb (79 kg; 12 st 7 lb)
- Position: Right wing
- Shot: Right
- Played for: Rochester Americans
- National team: United States
- NHL draft: 133rd overall, 1978; Buffalo Sabres
- Playing career: 1976–1980
Medal record
Men's ice hockey
Representing the United States
Olympic Games
| Gold medal – first place | 1980 Lake Placid | Team |

Eric Martin Strobel (born June 5, 1958) is an American former ice hockey forward who was a member of the "Miracle on Ice" 1980 gold medal-winning U.S. Olympic hockey team.

== Amateur career ==
Strobel attended Rochester Mayo High School where he earned all-conference honors in 1973-74, 1974–75 and 1975–76 before moving on to the University of Minnesota. He was a member of the 1979 University of Minnesota Golden Gophers NCAA championship team.

== International ==
Strobel first played for Team USA at the 1979 Ice Hockey World Championships in Moscow. His coach from Minnesota, Herb Brooks, was the coach for the U.S. for the 1980 Winter Olympics.

== Professional career ==
Drafted 133rd overall in the 1978 NHL entry draft by the Buffalo Sabres, Strobel never played with the parent club. He managed only half a season as a professional playing for their top minor league team, the Rochester Americans of the American Hockey League (AHL), before he broke his ankle during an AHL playoff game in the spring of 1980, and retired from hockey.

== Post-playing career ==
Strobel returned to Minnesota after his retirement and became a telephone sales executive in Apple Valley, Minnesota.

He previously coached the Peewee A team for the Eastview Athletic Association in Apple Valley.

== Personal ==
Strobel met his future wife Kim when he returned to university after his playing career ended, and they have two daughters, Leslie and Krista. Strobel's father, Art Strobel played for the New York Rangers.

Eric Strobel suffered a minor stroke on October 31, 2006 and recovered in the hospital. He leads a normal life after undergoing physical therapy.

== In popular culture ==
Strobel was not featured in Miracle on Ice, a 1981 TV movie, but appears in archival footage of the gold medal ceremony.

Robbie MacGregor portrayed Strobel in the 2004 film Miracle.

== Awards and honors ==
| Award | Year |
|---|---|
| All-NCAA All-Tournament Team | 1979 |

== Career statistics ==
=== Regular season and playoffs ===
| | | | Regular season | | | | | Playoffs |
| Season | Team | League | GP | G | A | Pts | PIM | GP | G | A | Pts | PIM |
|---|---|---|---|---|---|---|---|---|---|---|---|---|
| 1973–74 | Mayo High School | HS-MN |
| 1974–75 | Mayo High School | HS-MN |
| 1975–76 | Mayo High School | HS-MN |
| 1976–77 | University of Minnesota | WCHA | 39 | 11 | 14 | 25 | 12 | — | — | — | — | — |
| 1977–78 | University of Minnesota | WCHA | 38 | 11 | 18 | 29 | 30 | — | — | — | — | — |
| 1978–79 | University of Minnesota | WCHA | 44 | 30 | 22 | 52 | 34 | — | — | — | — | — |
| 1979–80 | United States | Intl | 49 | 14 | 24 | 38 | 22 | — | — | — | — | — |
| 1979–80 | Rochester Americans | AHL | 13 | 4 | 4 | 8 | 4 | 3 | 0 | 2 | 2 | 2 |
| WCHA totals | | | 121 | 52 | 54 | 106 | 76 | — | — | — | — | — |

=== International ===
| Year | Team | Event | GP | G | A | Pts | PIM |
|---|---|---|---|---|---|---|---|
| 1979 | United States | WC | 8 | 3 | 3 | 6 | 2 |
| 1980 | United States | OG | 7 | 1 | 2 | 3 | 2 |
| Senior totals | | | 15 | 4 | 5 | 9 | 4 |
