= Joseph Cure =

American ice hockey player and actor

- Born: Joseph O'Connell Cure; December 10, 1983; Bloomington, Minnesota, U.S.
- Died: November 8, 2015 (aged 31); Madison County, Montana, U.S.
- Education: University of California, Los Angeles (BS)
- Occupations: Actor, ice hockey player

Joseph O'Connell Cure (December 10, 1983 – November 8, 2015) was an American ice hockey player and actor. Cure made his film debut in Walt Disney Pictures' Miracle in 2004. Cure was cast as Mike Ramsey, the youngest member of the "Miracle on Ice" U.S. ice hockey team at the 1980 Winter Olympics.

== Early life and education ==
Cure, one of three siblings and a native of Bloomington, Minnesota, began playing ice hockey when he was five years old. He was playing bantam minor ice hockey before high school. In 2002, he and his hockey team from the Academy of Holy Angels won the Class AA Minnesota state hockey tournament. He graduated from the Academy of Holy Angels in 2002. Cure then relocated to Texas, where he played junior ice hockey. He attended Baylor University before being cast in Miracle.

Cure received a bachelor's degree from the University of California, Los Angeles in 2008. He moved to Bozeman, Montana, where he completed a post baccalaureate pre-med program. While applying to medical school, he was pursuing a master's in neuroscience at Montana State University by 2016.

== Career ==
Cure, who had no acting experience at the time, auditioned for a part in the Disney's Miracle, a film focusing on the Team USA's Miracle on Ice at the 1980 Olympics. Cure, the youngest actor cast as a player in the film, portrayed Mike Ramsey, the youngest player in the 1980 US ice hockey team. The film opened on February 6, 2004. In a 2004 interview before filming began, Cure recalled the audition process, "I'm out in L.A., auditioning and pretending to be an actor, hoping somebody buys it." Miracle marked his film debut. Ten years later, in a 2014 interview with the Minnesota magazine, Let's Play Hockey, Cure noted "The story of ‘Miracle’ is truly a love story about 20 young boys coming together and taking on the world. ... Being a part of ‘Miracle’ forever changed the way I view the Olympics."

== Death ==
Cure was killed in a traffic accident on Montana Highway 287 in Madison County, Montana, on November 8, 2015, at the age of 31. Slick conditions on Highway 287 caused his vehicle to skid and roll over several times. A passenger, who was also a Montana State student, was seriously injured in the accident. Cure was survived by his parents, Bob and Mary Cure, and two siblings, Kelly and Randy.
