= Bill Whelton =

American ice hockey player

- Born: August 28, 1958 (age 66); Everett, Massachusetts, U.S.
- Height: 6 ft 1 in (185 cm)
- Weight: 185 lb (84 kg; 13 st 3 lb)
- Position: Defence
- Shot: Left
- Played for: Winnipeg Jets
- NHL draft: 61st overall, 1979; Winnipeg Jets
- Playing career: 1981–1989

William Whelton (born August 28, 1959) is an American former professional ice hockey player who played two games in the National Hockey League. He played for the Winnipeg Jets.

== Career statistics ==
=== Regular season and playoffs ===
			Regular season					Playoffs
Season	Team	League	GP	G	A	Pts	PIM	GP	G	A	Pts	PIM
1978–79	Boston University	ECAC	30	2	5	7	20	—	—	—	—	—
1979–80	Boston University	ECAC	25	4	14	18	39	—	—	—	—	—
1980–81	Boston University	ECAC	29	4	18	22	42	—	—	—	—	—
1980–81	Winnipeg Jets	NHL	2	0	0	0	0	—	—	—	—	—
1981–82	Tulsa Oilers	CHL	66	2	18	20	51	3	0	0	0	2
1982–83	Sherbrooke Jets	AHL	72	4	16	20	73	—	—	—	—	—
1983–84	Sherbrooke Jets	AHL	67	2	14	16	32	—	—	—	—	—
1984–85	Kiekko-Reipas Lahti	FIN	34	2	3	5	54	—	—	—	—	—
1985–86	HC Brunico	ITA	35	12	21	33	61	5	1	4	5	4
1986–87	EHC Chur	NLA	3	0	0	0	2	—	—	—	—	—
1988–89	Kitzbüheler EC	AUT-2	—	—	—	—	—	—	—	—	—	—
NHL totals			2	0	0	0	0	—	—	—	—	—

Awards and achievements
Preceded by Mark Fidler	ECAC Hockey Rookie of the Year; 1978–79	Succeeded by Mark Fusco
