= Howard Walker (ice hockey) =

Canadian ice hockey player

- Born: August 5, 1958 (age 68) Grande Prairie, Alberta, Canada
- Height: 6 ft 0 in (183 cm)
- Weight: 205 lb (93 kg; 14 st 9 lb)
- Position: Defence
- Shot: Left
- Played for: Washington Capitals; Calgary Flames
- NHL draft: Undrafted
- Playing career: 1980–1983

Howard K. Walker (born August 5, 1958) is a Canadian former ice hockey defenceman. He played 83 games in the National Hockey League (NHL) for the Washington Capitals and Calgary Flames from 1980 to 1982.

== Early life ==
Walker was born in Grande Prairie, Alberta. He played junior hockey with the Pass Red Devils and Penticton Vees. At the University of North Dakota, Walker was a member of the North Dakota Fighting Hawks men's ice hockey team.

== Career ==
Originally signed by the Washington Capitals as a free agent in 1980 NHL entry draft, Walker played parts of two seasons there before he was traded to the Flames. He played with the Hershey Bears and Colorado Flames before retiring at the end of the 1982–83 NHL season.

== Career statistics ==
=== Regular season and playoffs ===
			Regular season					Playoffs
Season	Team	League	GP	G	A	Pts	PIM	GP	G	A	Pts	PIM
1974–75	The Pass Red Devils	AJHL	1	1	0	1	0	—	—	—	—	—
1975–76	The Pass Red Devils	AJHL	—	—	—	—	—	—	—	—	—	—
1976–77	Penticton Vees	BCJHL	—	—	—	—	—	—	—	—	—	—
1977–78	Penticton Vees	BCJHL	56	31	47	78	223	—	—	—	—	—
1978–79	University of North Dakota	WCHA	38	7	16	23	76	—	—	—	—	—
1979–80	University of North Dakota	WCHA	39	7	18	25	57	—	—	—	—	—
1980–81	Washington Capitals	NHL	64	2	11	13	100	—	—	—	—	—
1980–81	Hershey Bears	AHL	7	1	0	1	24	—	—	—	—	—
1981–82	Washington Capitals	NHL	16	0	2	2	26	—	—	—	—	—
1981–82	Hershey Bears	AHL	54	3	4	7	62	—	—	—	—	—
1982–83	Calgary Flames	NHL	3	0	0	0	7	—	—	—	—	—
1982–83	Colorado Flames	CHL	69	4	19	23	172	6	3	2	5	11
NHL totals			83	2	13	15	133	—	—	—	—	—

== Awards and honors ==
Award	Year
All-NCAA All-Tournament Team	1979
All-WCHA First Team	1979–80
AHCA West All-American	1979–80
