= Jim Brown (ice hockey) =

American ice hockey player (born 1960)

- Born: March 1, 1960 (age 65); Phoenix, Arizona, U.S.
- Height: 6 ft 4 in (193 cm)
- Weight: 210 lb (95 kg; 15 st 0 lb)
- Position: Defense
- Shot: Right
- Played for: Los Angeles Kings
- NHL draft: 92nd overall, 1979; Los Angeles Kings
- Playing career: 1982–1984

James Carlton Brown (born March 1, 1960) is an American former professional ice hockey defenseman who played in three games with the Los Angeles Kings of the National Hockey League (NHL) in the 1982–83 season. Brown was born in Phoenix, Arizona, but grew up in Canton, New York.

== Career statistics ==
=== Regular season and playoffs ===
			Regular season					Playoffs
Season	Team	League	GP	G	A	Pts	PIM	GP	G	A	Pts	PIM
1976–77	Rochester Monarchs	NY-PENN	48	13	19	32	—	—	—	—	—	—
1977–78	Rochester Monarchs	NY-PENN	48	16	27	43	—	—	—	—	—	—
1977–78	Aquinas Institute	HS-NY	—	—	—	—	—	—	—	—	—	—
1978–79	University of Notre Dame	WCHA	37	4	8	12	40	—	—	—	—	—
1979–80	University of Notre Dame	WCHA	36	5	13	18	40	—	—	—	—	—
1980–81	University of Notre Dame	WCHA	27	2	7	9	45	—	—	—	—	—
1981–82	University of Notre Dame	WCHA	39	8	19	27	101	—	—	—	—	—
1982–83	Los Angeles Kings	NHL	3	0	1	1	5	—	—	—	—	—
1982–83	New Haven Nighthawks	AHL	75	3	12	15	120	12	2	4	6	8
1983–84	New Haven Nighthawks	AHL	39	2	4	6	18	—	—	—	—	—
AHL totals			114	5	16	21	138	12	2	4	6	8
NHL totals			3	0	1	1	5	—	—	—	—	—
