= Steve Christoff =

American ice hockey player (born 1958)

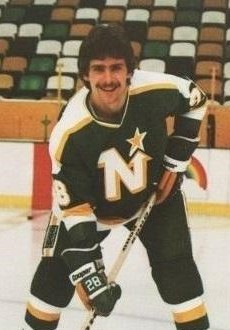
- Born: January 23, 1958 (age 68) Springfield, Illinois, U.S.
- Height: 6 ft 1 in (185 cm)
- Weight: 180 lb (82 kg; 12 st 12 lb)
- Position: Center
- Shot: Right
- Played for: NHL; Minnesota North Stars; Calgary Flames; Los Angeles Kings
- National team: United States
- NHL draft: 24th overall, 1978; Minnesota North Stars
- Playing career: 1979–1984
Medal record
Men's ice hockey
Representing the United States
Olympic Games
Gold medal – first place	1980 Lake Placid	Team

Steven Mark Christoff (born January 23, 1958) is an American former professional ice hockey forward who played 248 regular season games in the NHL with the Minnesota North Stars, Calgary Flames, and Los Angeles Kings from 1980–84.

Christoff is best known for being a member of the "Miracle on Ice" 1980 U.S. Olympic hockey team that won the gold medal.

== Biography ==
=== Amateur career ===
Steve Christoff grew up in Richfield, Minnesota and graduated from Richfield High School. As a member of the Richfield High School hockey team, he earned team MVP his junior and senior year, and was selected to the Minnesota High School All-State First Team and the U.S. High School All-American Team during his senior year in 1975-76. He led his school to a state runner-up his senior season and was one of the most highly recruited U.S. hockey players in 1976. Before turning professional, Christoff attended the University of Minnesota where he played for the Minnesota Gophers for three seasons, from 1976–79. He led the team in scoring during his second year with 66 points (32 goals and 34 assists) and was named to the WCHA All-Star Second Team. During his third year, he led the team in scoring again with 77 points (38 goals and 39 assists). In what turned out to be his last collegiate game on March 23, 1979, Christoff scored a goal and earned an assist to help Minnesota win its third NCAA title in school history with a 4–3 victory over North Dakota. He made his international debut for Team USA at the 1979 Ice Hockey World Championship tournament in Moscow.

=== Professional career ===
Christoff was selected 24th overall in the 1978 NHL entry draft by the Minnesota North Stars. He joined the North Stars for 20 games after the Olympics, scoring eight goals and 15 points. The next year, he suited up for 56 games, netting 26 goals and 39 points and was one of the Stars' best performers as Minnesota lost the 1981 Stanley Cup Final to the New York Islanders. He also participated in the 1981 Canada Cup tournament as a member of Team USA. In 1981–82, Christoff appeared in 69 games, scoring 26 goals and 55 points, a career high. Although he was an extremely popular figure in Minnesota, Christoff was traded to the Calgary Flames for the 1982–83 season, but he was used in just 45 games, scoring nine goals and 17 points. In 1983–84, Christoff played his final season in the NHL, with the Los Angeles Kings, starting 58 games.

=== Post hockey career ===
Christoff recently retired as an airline pilot for Minneapolis-based Mesaba Airlines (later Endeavor Air) since retiring from hockey. He was named one of the 50 greatest players in University of Minnesota hockey history as part of "Legends on Ice" tribute in 2001.

== In popular culture ==
In the 1981 TV movie about the gold medal-winning hockey team entitled Miracle on Ice, Christoff's character is played by Rick Rockwell, but is not listed in the film's credits.

Scott Johnson portrayed Christoff in the 2004 Disney film Miracle.

Christoff was also the model for the Hobey Baker Award trophy.

== Awards and achievements ==
Award	Year
All-WCHA Second Team	1977–78
All-WCHA Second Team	1978–79
All-NCAA All-Tournament Team	1979

== Career statistics ==
=== Regular season and playoffs ===
			Regular season					Playoffs
Season	Team	League	GP	G	A	Pts	PIM	GP	G	A	Pts	PIM
1975–76	Richfield High School	High-MN	—	—	—	—	—	—	—	—	—	—
1976–77	University of Minnesota	WCHA	38	7	9	16	20	—	—	—	—	—
1977–78	University of Minnesota	WCHA	38	32	34	66	18	—	—	—	—	—
1978–79	University of Minnesota	WCHA	43	38	39	77	50	—	—	—	—	—
1979–80	United States	Intl.	57	35	26	61	22	—	—	—	—	—
1979–80	Minnesota North Stars	NHL	20	8	7	15	19	14	8	4	12	7
1980–81	Minnesota North Stars	NHL	56	26	13	39	58	18	8	8	16	16
1980–81	Oklahoma City Stars	CHL	3	1	0	1	0	—	—	—	—	—
1981–82	Minnesota North Stars	NHL	69	26	29	55	14	2	0	0	0	2
1982–83	Calgary Flames	NHL	45	9	8	17	4	1	0	0	0	0
1983–84	Los Angeles Kings	NHL	58	8	7	15	13	—	—	—	—	—
NHL totals			248	77	64	141	108	35	16	12	28	25

=== International ===
Year	Team	Event	GP	G	A	Pts	PIM
1979	United States	WC	8	3	2	5	4
1980	United States	OG	7	2	1	3	6
1981	United States	CC	6	1	5	6	4
Senior totals			21	6	8	14	14
