= Steven Griffith =

American ice hockey player (1961–2022)

- Born: March 12, 1961 Roseville, Minnesota, U.S.
- Died: November 1, 2022 (aged 61) Stillwater, Minnesota, U.S.
- Height: 5 ft 10 in (178 cm)
- Weight: 181 lb (82 kg; 12 st 13 lb)
- Position: Left wing
- Shot: Right
- Played for: University of Minnesota
- National team: United States
- Playing career: 1979–1983

Steven Griffith (March 12, 1961 – November 1, 2022) was an American ice hockey player. He played for the University of Minnesota Golden Gophers during his career. He also played for the American national team at the 1984 Winter Olympics and 1981 World Junior Championship.

== Career statistics ==
=== Regular season and playoffs ===
			Regular season					Playoffs
Season	Team	League	GP	G	A	Pts	PIM	GP	G	A	Pts	PIM
1976–77	Hill-Murray School	HSMN						—	—	—	—	—
1977–78	Hill-Murray School	HSMN						—	—	—	—	—
1978–79	Hill-Murray School	HSMN						—	—	—	—	—
1979–80	University of Minnesota	WCHA	32	9	7	16	14	—	—	—	—	—
1980–81	University of Minnesota	WCHA	35	4	4	8	22	—	—	—	—	—
1981–82	University of Minnesota	WCHA	27	7	9	16	16	—	—	—	—	—
1982–83	University of Minnesota	WCHA	44	12	43	55	14	—	—	—	—	—
1983–84	United States National Team	Intl						—	—	—	—	—
WCHA totals			138	32	63	95	66	—	—	—	—	—

=== International ===
Year	Team	Event	GP	G	A	Pts	PIM
1981	United States	WJC	5	0	3	3	6
1984	United States	OG	6	0	0	0	0
Senior totals			6	0	0	0	0
