= Mike Ramsey (ice hockey) =

American ice hockey player (born 1960)

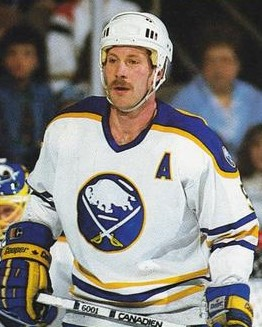
- Ramsey with the Buffalo Sabres in 1988
- Born: December 3, 1960 (age 65) Minneapolis, Minnesota, U.S.
- Height: 6 ft 3 in (191 cm)
- Weight: 190 lb (86 kg; 13 st 8 lb)
- Position: Defense
- Shot: Left
- Played for: Buffalo Sabres; Pittsburgh Penguins; Detroit Red Wings
- National team: United States
- NHL draft: 11th overall, 1979; Buffalo Sabres
- Playing career: 1980–1996
Medal record
Men's ice hockey
Representing the United States
Olympic Games
Gold medal – first place	1980 Lake Placid	Ice hockey

Michael Allen Ramsey (born December 3, 1960) is an American former professional ice hockey defenseman who played 1,070 regular season games in the National Hockey League (NHL) for the Buffalo Sabres, Pittsburgh Penguins, and Detroit Red Wings between 1980 and 1997, after helping the United States men's national ice hockey team win the gold medal at the 1980 Winter Olympics. A proficient defender who played seventeen seasons in the NHL, most prominently for the Buffalo Sabres, Ramsey was subsequently inducted into the United States Hockey Hall of Fame.

After his playing career ended, he served as an assistant coach with the Buffalo Sabres and Minnesota Wild from 1997 to 2010.

== Early life ==
Ramsey attended Roosevelt High School in Minneapolis. He was considered the top high school defenseman in Minnesota as a senior in the 1977–78 season. He subsequently was inducted into the athletic Hall of Fame. He also attended the U.S. National Junior training camp in summer of 1978 and participated in the 1979 World Junior Ice Hockey Championships while playing at the University of Minnesota.

== International career ==
Ramsey was the youngest member of the U.S. team that upset the Soviet Union at the 1980 Winter Olympics in Lake Placid, New York, in an event known as the Miracle on Ice. The American team, which went on to defeat Finland for the gold medal, was coached by Herb Brooks, who was Ramsey's coach at the University of Minnesota. Ramsey's abilities to move the puck and defend endeared him to the team. Upon winning the gold medal at Lake Placid, Ramsey made a hike to get back to his living quarters that saw him stopped by a state trooper that only let him go after Ramsey pulled off his jacket to show the medal to the trooper.

Ramsey later described Brooks as a "demanding" coach to play for but stated that his relationship with him after the Games was "very good", specifically with being able to banter with him.

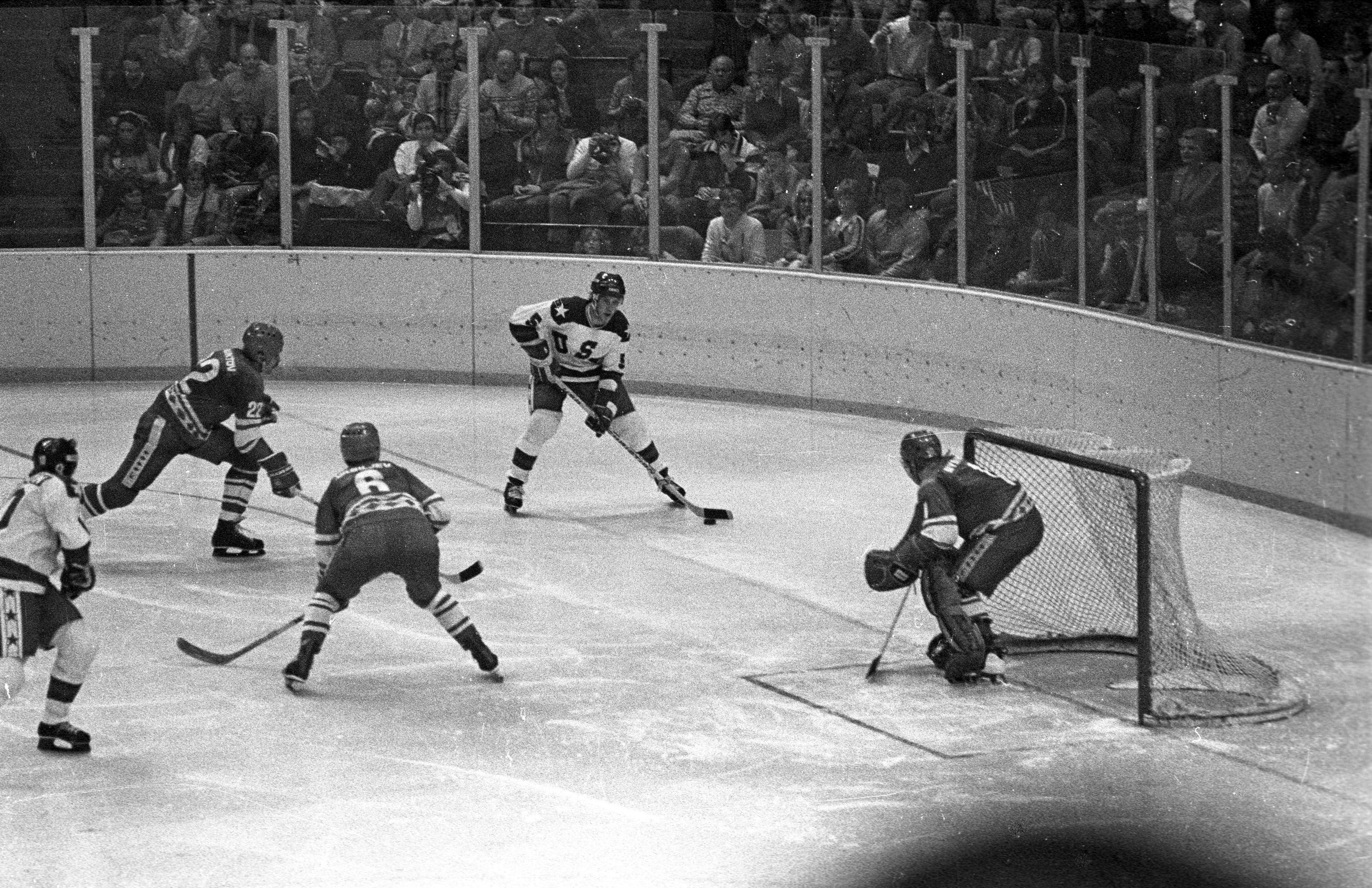
Ramsey (#5) with the puck during the Miracle on Ice game, February 22, 1980. Looking on are Soviet players Viktor Zhluktov (#22) and Valeri Vasiliev (#6), Soviet goaltender Vladimir Myshkin (#1), and American player Mark Johnson (#10).

== Professional career ==
Drafted 11th overall by the Buffalo Sabres in the 1979 NHL entry draft, Ramsey would go on to play in the National Hockey League immediately after the Olympics. Ramsey described the first season as a frantic one of adjustment in a 2019 interview:

I was all over the ice, I was everywhere, and after I don't know how many games right in my first full year Scotty [Bowman] said, 'Do you want to score? Do you want to block shots? Do you want to hit? Do you want to sell tickets?' He goes, 'You want to drive the Zamboni, too?' And then he said, 'I want you to just play defense. I'm going to tie you to the net and just play defense.' And I said, 'Yeah, I can do that.' It was almost refreshing. It was like, just go play defense. It changed my game and, after about two years, they labeled me a defensive defenseman and I had no problem with that. No problem with that label.

He had one of the most successful NHL careers of the 1980 U.S. Olympians, playing 14 seasons for the Sabres. Primarily known as an offensive defenseman as an amateur, he successfully adapted to the bigger and tougher NHL by becoming a stay-at-home defenseman in Buffalo that later saw him described as a "working man's defenseman". Highlights of his career with the Sabres include playing in the NHL All-Star Game four times (1982, 1983, 1985, and 1986) as well as being a member of the NHL All-Star team that played the Soviet national hockey team in Rendez-Vous '87. Ramsey also served as the Sabres' team captain from 1990 to 1992. He continued to play for Team USA during this time, participating in the 1982 Ice Hockey World Championships and the 1984 and 1987 Canada Cup tournaments.

Ramsey's old coach in Buffalo, Scotty Bowman, brought him to the Pittsburgh Penguins during the 1992–93 season to shore up the team's defensive corps as it made a run at a third straight Stanley Cup championship. However, the Penguins were upset in the second round by the New York Islanders. After another season in Pittsburgh, Ramsey signed with the Detroit Red Wings, who by now were also coached by Bowman, as a free agent. In April 1995, Ramsey became teammates with defenseman Viacheslav Fetisov when Detroit acquired the latter in a trade with the New Jersey Devils; Fetisov had played for the Soviets during the 1980 Olympics. That year, Ramsey played in his first and only Stanley Cup Final, but the Red Wings were swept by the Devils, who had Ramsey's 1980 Olympic teammate, Neal Broten, on their roster. The next season, the powerful Red Wings set a league record for most wins in a single season with 62 and made it to the Western Conference Final against the Colorado Avalanche. Game 1 saw the Red Wings defeated in overtime on a Mike Keane shot that went by Ramsey (who decided to not slide before Keane used him as a screen). The Avalanche upset the Red Wings in six games. Ramsey initially announced his retirement at the end of that season but returned in March 1997 to play two games of the 1996-97 season, recording three shots with no goals or assists before retiring in that same month. He retired with a plus-minus of +203; only 59 other players had a plus-minus of +200 in NHL history at the time he retired. He recorded a negative plus-minus in just one of his eighteen seasons.

== Post-playing career ==
Ramsey returned to Minnesota after finishing his NHL career where he ran a sporting goods store named "Gold Medal Sports" and played senior league hockey. He returned to the NHL in 1997 to serve as an assistant coach with the Buffalo Sabres under his former teammate and friend Lindy Ruff. Ramsey was part of the coaching staff when the team reached the Stanley Cup Final in 1999, which saw the infamous series-ending goal that Ramsey bitterly rued about years later. On July 24, 2000, he left the Sabres to take the same position with the expansion team Minnesota Wild, as head coached by Jacques Lemaire. He was with the Wild until June 2010, closing out 31 years of playing hockey on his terms, deciding instead to focus on his family (he noted that on game days as a coach, he would be at the rink from 7 a.m. until midnight). He co-founded a hedge fund and as of 2026 was currently retired and residing in Minnesota.

He was inducted into the Greater Buffalo Sports Hall of Fame in 1998. In 2001, he was inducted into both the United States Hockey Hall of Fame and the Buffalo Sabres Hall of Fame.

== Personal life ==
Ramsey has three children with his wife Jill, with two of them choosing to play hockey. His oldest daughter Rachel played defense for the University of Minnesota, which won the NCAA women's ice hockey tournament in 2012, 2013 and 2015 that saw her named to the WCHA All-Rookie team; she later became a radio host. His second daughter Hannah became a competitive dancer as a student for the University of St. Thomas in St. Paul. Ramsey's youngest child Jack played for the Penticton Vees in the British Columbia Hockey League and was drafted by the Chicago Blackhawks in the 2014 NHL entry draft before electing to play with the University of Minnesota from 2015 to 2019.

== In popular culture ==
Ramsey was played by Joseph Cure in the 2004 Disney film Miracle, which was about the Miracle on Ice hockey team.

== Awards and achievements ==
- All-NCAA All-Tournament Team (1979)
- NHL All-Star Game selection (1982, 1983, 1985, 1986)
- Played in Rendez-Vous '87

== Career statistics ==
=== Regular season and playoffs ===
			Regular season					Playoffs
Season	Team	League	GP	G	A	Pts	PIM	GP	G	A	Pts	PIM
1977–78	Roosevelt High School	HS-MN	—	—	—	—	—	—	—	—	—	—
1978–79	University of Minnesota	WCHA	26	6	11	17	30	—	—	—	—	—
1979–80	United States National Team	Intl	56	11	22	33	55	—	—	—	—	—
1979–80	Buffalo Sabres	NHL	13	1	6	7	6	13	1	2	3	12
1980–81	Buffalo Sabres	NHL	72	3	14	17	56	8	0	3	3	20
1981–82	Buffalo Sabres	NHL	80	7	23	30	56	4	1	1	2	14
1982–83	Buffalo Sabres	NHL	77	8	30	38	55	10	4	4	8	15
1983–84	Buffalo Sabres	NHL	72	9	22	31	82	3	0	1	1	6
1984–85	Buffalo Sabres	NHL	79	8	22	30	102	5	0	1	1	23
1985–86	Buffalo Sabres	NHL	76	7	21	28	117	—	—	—	—	—
1986–87	Buffalo Sabres	NHL	80	8	31	39	109	—	—	—	—	—
1987–88	Buffalo Sabres	NHL	63	5	16	21	77	6	0	3	3	29
1988–89	Buffalo Sabres	NHL	56	2	14	16	84	5	1	0	1	11
1989–90	Buffalo Sabres	NHL	73	4	21	25	47	6	0	1	1	8
1990–91	Buffalo Sabres	NHL	71	6	14	20	46	5	1	0	1	12
1991–92	Buffalo Sabres	NHL	66	3	14	17	67	7	0	2	2	8
1992–93	Buffalo Sabres	NHL	33	2	8	10	20	—	—	—	—	—
1992–93	Pittsburgh Penguins	NHL	12	1	2	3	8	12	0	6	6	4
1993–94	Pittsburgh Penguins	NHL	65	2	2	4	22	1	0	0	0	0
1994–95	Detroit Red Wings	NHL	33	1	2	3	23	15	0	1	1	4
1995–96	Detroit Red Wings	NHL	47	2	4	6	35	15	0	4	4	10
1996–97	Detroit Red Wings	NHL	2	0	0	0	0	—	—	—	—	—
NHL totals			1,070	79	266	345	1,012	115	8	29	37	176

=== International ===
Year	Team	Event	Result	GP	G	A	Pts	PIM
1979	United States	WJC	6th	5	1	1	2	10
1980	United States	OG	1st place, gold medalist(s)	7	0	2	2	8
1982	United States	WC	8th	7	1	0	1	8
1984	United States	CC	4th	6	1	1	2	6
1987	United States	CC	5th	5	0	1	1	2
Junior totals				5	1	1	2	10
Senior totals				25	2	4	6	24

== See also ==
- List of members of the United States Hockey Hall of Fame
- List of NHL players with 1,000 games played
- Miracle on Ice

Sporting positions
Preceded by Larry Playfair	Buffalo Sabres first-round draft pick 1979	Succeeded by Steve Patrick
Preceded by Mike Foligno	Buffalo Sabres captain 1991–92	Succeeded by Pat LaFontaine
