= Marc Chorney =

Canadian ice hockey player (born 1959)

- Born: November 8, 1959 (age 66) Fort William, Ontario, Canada
- Height: 6 ft 0 in (183 cm)
- Weight: 200 lb (91 kg; 14 st 4 lb)
- Position: Defence
- Shot: Left
- Played for: Pittsburgh Penguins; Los Angeles Kings
- NHL draft: 115th overall, 1979; Pittsburgh Penguins
- Playing career: 1980–1985

Marcus P. Chorney (born November 8, 1959) is a Canadian former professional ice hockey defenceman.

== Playing career ==
Born in Fort William (now Thunder Bay), Ontario, Chorney played four successful seasons of college hockey at the University of North Dakota. He was named to the NCAA All-Tournament team in 1980, and two first All Star teams in 1981. He began his playing career with the Pittsburgh Penguins who drafted him in the sixth round of the 1979 NHL entry draft. Chorney was traded to the Los Angeles Kings for a sixth round choice (Stuart Marston) in the 1985 NHL entry draft. After spending a season with the Kings, he was signed by the Washington Capitals but failed to earn a spot on the roster.

== Personal life ==
His son Taylor Chorney is a defenceman who played in 166 NHL games, and last played for EC Red Bull Salzburg in Austria. He has another son, Marcus Chorney, Jr, who plays hockey for the Quinnipiac University Bobcats in the ECAC.

== Awards and honors ==
Award	Year
All-WCHA Second Team	1979–80
All-NCAA All-Tournament Team	1980
All-WCHA First Team	1980–81
AHCA West All-American	1980–81

== Career statistics ==
			Regular Season					Playoffs
Season	Team	League	GP	G	A	Pts	PIM	GP	G	A	Pts	PIM
1978–79	North Dakota Fighting Sioux	WCHA	41	8	14	22	98	—	—	—	—	—
1979–80	North Dakota Fighting Sioux	WCHA	39	7	38	45	54	—	—	—	—	—
1980–81	North Dakota Fighting Sioux	WCHA	35	8	34	42	72	—	—	—	—	—
1980–81	Pittsburgh Penguins	NHL	8	1	6	7	14	2	0	1	1	2
1981–82	Pittsburgh Penguins	NHL	60	1	6	7	63	5	0	0	0	0
1981–82	Erie Blades	AHL	6	1	3	4	4	—	—	—	—	—
1982–83	Pittsburgh Penguins	NHL	67	3	5	8	66	—	—	—	—	—
1983–84	Pittsburgh Penguins	NHL	4	0	1	1	8	—	—	—	—	—
1983–84	Los Angeles Kings	NHL	71	3	9	12	58	—	—	—	—	—
1984–85	Binghamton Whalers	AHL	48	4	25	29	38	7	0	4	4	9
NHL totals			210	8	27	35	209	7	0	1	1	2
