= Tim Harrer =

American ice hockey player (born 1957)

- Born: May 10, 1957 (age 68) Bloomington, Minnesota, U.S.
- Height: 6 ft 0 in (183 cm)
- Weight: 185 lb (84 kg; 13 st 3 lb)
- Position: Right wing
- Shot: Right
- Played for: Calgary Flames; Grazer SV
- National team: United States
- NHL draft: 148th overall, 1977; Atlanta Flames
- WHA draft: 78th overall, 1977; Calgary Cowboys
- Playing career: 1980–1985

Timothy Steven Harrer (born May 10, 1957) is an American former ice hockey winger who played three games in the National Hockey League for the Calgary Flames during the 1982–83 season.

== Early life ==
Harrer was born in Bloomington, Minnesota to David and Nancy Harrer. Harrer played a variety of sports at Bloomington Lincoln High in football, baseball, and hockey; in the summer, he would shoot lead pucks at sheet of plywood. He played right wing for Minnesota Golden Gophers men's ice hockey team from 1976 to 1980 for head coach Herb Brooks (1976-1979) and Brad Buetow (1979-80). In his senior season, he scored 53 goals to set a new university record and is still the only Golden Gopher with a 50-goal season. In 2016, he was inducted into the University of Minnesota Gopher Sports Hall of Fame.

== Career ==
Harrer was among the dozens of players offered a try-out for the 1980 Winter Olympics for the United States men's hockey team alongside a handful of teammates from Minnesota and in the middle of his senior season he played in four games for Team USA in the buildup to the games before head coach Herb Brooks decided to cut him (Harrer went back to Minnesota to finish his senior season).

Harrer was drafted by the Atlanta Flames in the ninth round, 148th overall in the 1977 NHL entry draft and the Calgary Cowboys in the ninth round, 78th overall in the 1977 WHA Amateur Draft.

In the 2004 film Miracle, which tells the story of the "Miracle on Ice" game at the 1980 Winter Olympics, Adam Knight portrays Harrer.

== Career statistics ==
=== Regular season and playoffs ===
			Regular season					Playoffs
Season	Team	League	GP	G	A	Pts	PIM	GP	G	A	Pts	PIM
1974–75	Abraham Lincoln High School	HS-MN	—	—	—	—	—	—	—	—	—	—
1975–76	Bloomington Junior Stars	MidJHL	11	5	3	8	6	7	2	3	5	2
1976–77	University of Minnesota	WCHA	38	14	9	23	37	—	—	—	—	—
1977–78	University of Minnesota	WCHA	35	22	21	43	36	—	—	—	—	—
1978–79	University of Minnesota	WCHA	43	28	25	53	38	—	—	—	—	—
1979–80	University of Minnesota	WCHA	41	53	29	82	50	—	—	—	—	—
1979–80	American National Team	Intl	4	1	3	4	0	—	—	—	—	—
1979–80	Birmingham Bulls	CHL	2	0	0	0	0	4	0	2	2	5
1980–81	Hershey Bears	AHL	39	7	6	13	12	2	0	0	0	)
1980–81	Birmingham Bulls	CHL	28	9	5	14	36	—	—	—	—	—
1981–82	Oklahoma City Stars	CHL	77	29	27	56	36	4	2	2	4	0
1982–83	Calgary Flames	NHL	3	0	0	0	2	—	—	—	—	—
1982–83	Colorado Flames	CHL	69	33	29	62	28	6	3	3	6	4
1983–84	Salt Lake Golden Eagles	CHL	66	42	27	69	46	5	1	2	3	5
1984–85	Toledo Goaldiggers	IHL	28	6	10	16	28	—	—	—	—	—
1984–85	Nova Scotia Oilers	AHL	7	0	0	0	0	—	—	—	—	—
1984–85	Grazer SV	AUT	4	3	1	4	2	—	—	—	—	—
CHL totals			242	113	88	201	146	19	6	9	15	14
NHL totals			3	0	0	0	2	—	—	—	—	—

== Awards and honors ==
Award	Year
All-WCHA First Team	1979–80
AHCA West All-American	1979–80

Awards and achievements
Preceded by Mark Johnson	WCHA Most Valuable Player; 1979–80	Succeeded by Steve Ulseth
