= Steve Janaszak =

American ice hockey player

- Born: January 7, 1957 (age 69) Saint Paul, Minnesota, U.S.
- Height: 6 ft 1 in (185 cm)
- Weight: 210 lb (95 kg; 15 st 0 lb)
- Position: Goaltender
- Caught: Left
- Played for: Minnesota North Stars; Colorado Rockies
- National team: United States
- NHL draft: Undrafted
- Playing career: 1979–1983
Medal record
Men's ice hockey
Representing the United States
Olympic Games
Gold medal – first place	1980 Lake Placid	Team

Steven James Janaszak (born January 7, 1957) is an American former ice hockey goaltender who played three games in the National Hockey League (NHL) with the Minnesota North Stars and Colorado Rockies between 1980 and 1982.

== Amateur career ==
Janaszak first became known in the hockey world as the star goaltender for Hill-Murray School on the East Side of Saint Paul. Janaszak attended the University of Minnesota where he was a goaltender for the Minnesota Golden Gophers. He was voted most valuable player in the 1979 national championship tournament as the Gophers won the NCAA title. Janaszak is best known for being the back-up goalie to Jim Craig on the Miracle on Ice 1980 U.S. Olympic hockey team that won the gold medal. Janaszak was the only member of the team to not appear in any of the games at the Olympics.

== Professional career ==
Janaszak signed a free agent contract with the North Stars after the Olympics and appeared in one regular season game that season, a solid 2–2 draw against the Buffalo Sabres. Unfortunately for Janaszak, the North Stars already had two quality goaltenders in Gilles Meloche and Gary Edwards, so there was no room for him. After spending the next season in the minor leagues, Janaszak returned to the NHL with the Colorado Rockies, who had signed him as a free agent soon after the end of the 1979-80 season. He also played three games for Team USA as Glenn Resch's backup at the 1982 Ice Hockey World Championship tournament in Helsinki, before retiring from the game after the 1982–83 season.

== In popular culture ==
In the 1981 TV movie about the gold medal-winning U.S. hockey team called Miracle on Ice, Janaszak does not appear as a character, but rather in archival footage of the gold medal ceremony.

He is played by Sam Skoryna in the 2004 Disney film Miracle.

== Life outside sports ==
He met his future wife, who was working as an interpreter during the 1980 Olympics in the athlete village, and they were married a year later. He works as an investment manager on Long Island, N.Y.

== Career statistics ==
=== Regular season and playoffs ===
			Regular season									Playoffs
Season	Team	League	GP	W	L	T	MIN	GA	SO	GAA	SV%	GP	W	L	MIN	GA	SO	GAA	SV%
1971–72	Hill-Murray School	HS-MN	—	—	—	—	—	—	—	—	—	—	—	—	—	—	—	—	—
1972–73	Hill-Murray School	HS-MN	—	—	—	—	—	—	—	—	—	—	—	—	—	—	—	—	—
1973–74	Hill-Murray School	HS-MN	—	—	—	—	—	—	—	—	—	—	—	—	—	—	—	—	—
1974–75	Hill-Murray School	HS-MN	—	—	—	—	—	—	—	—	—	—	—	—	—	—	—	—	—
1975–76	University of Minnesota	B-10	4	1	2	0	240	21	0	5.25	—	—	—	—	—	—	—	—	—
1976–77	University of Minnesota	B-10	17	6	9	2	1100	86	0	4.69	—	—	—	—	—	—	—	—	—
1977–78	University of Minnesota	B-10	28	14	10	2	1653	106	3	3.85	—	—	—	—	—	—	—	—	—
1978–79	University of Minnesota	B-10	41	29	11	1	2428	131	1	3.23	—	—	—	—	—	—	—	—	—
1979–80	United States National Team	Intl	17	—	—	—	—	—	2	3.15	—	—	—	—	—	—	—	—	—
1979–80	Minnesota North Stars	NHL	1	0	0	1	60	2	0	2.00	.929	—	—	—	—	—	—	—	—
1979–80	Oklahoma City Stars	CHL	1	1	0	0	60	2	0	2.00	—	—	—	—	—	—	—	—	—
1979–80	Tulsa Oilers	CHL	1	0	1	0	59	6	0	6.10	—	—	—	—	—	—	—	—	—
1979–80	Baltimore Clippers	EHL	4	—	—	—	219	19	0	5.21	—	—	—	—	—	—	—	—	—
1980–81	Fort Worth Texans	CHL	6	0	6	0	357	26	0	4.37	—	—	—	—	—	—	—	—	—
1980–81	Fort Wayne Komets	IHL	42	—	—	—	2196	130	0	3.55	—	3	—	—	104	7	0	4.04	—
1981–82	Colorado Rockies	NHL	2	0	1	0	100	13	0	7.80	.857	—	—	—	—	—	—	—	—
1982–83	Wichita Wind	CHL	35	13	18	1	1996	147	0	4.42	—	—	—	—	—	—	—	—	—
NHL totals			3	0	1	1	160	15	0	5.63	.874	—	—	—	—	—	—	—	—

=== International ===
Year	Team	Event	GP	W	L	T	MIN	GA	SO	GAA	SV%
1982	United States	WJC	3	—	—	—	180	17	0	5.56	—
Senior totals			3	—	—	—	180	17	0	5.56	—

== Awards and achievements ==
Award	Year
NCAA All-Tournament Team	1979
Ken McKenzie Trophy (U.S.- Born Rookie of the Year - IHL; shared with Mike Labianca)	1981

Awards and achievements
Preceded by Jack O'Callahan	NCAA Tournament Most Outstanding Player; 1979	Succeeded by Doug Smail
