= 1979 WCHA men's ice hockey tournament =

1979 WCHA Men's ice hockey tournament
- Dates: March 6–11, 1979
- Teams: 8
- Finals site: Williams Arena; Minneapolis, Minnesota; Winter Sports Center; Grand Forks, North Dakota
- Champions: Minnesota† (6th title); North Dakota‡ (3rd title)
- Winning coach: Herb Brooks (4th title); John Gasparini (1st title)
- WCHA Men's Ice Hockey Tournaments

The 1979 WCHA Men's Ice Hockey Tournament was the 20th conference playoff in league history. The tournament was played between March 6 and March 11, 1979. All games were played at home team campus sites, including each of the two regional final series. By winning the regional tournaments, both Minnesota and North Dakota were invited to participate in the 1979 NCAA Division I Men's Ice Hockey Tournament.

Though not official designations, Minnesota is considered as the East Regional Champion† and North Dakota as the West Regional Champion‡.

== Format ==
The top eight teams in the WCHA, according to their final conference standings, were eligible for the tournament and were seeded No. 1 through No. 8. In the first round the first and eighth seeds, the second and seventh seeds, the third and sixth seeds and the fourth and fifth seeds were matched in two-game series where the school that scored the higher number of goals was declared the winner. After the first round the remaining teams were reseeded No. 1 through No. 4 according to their final conference standings and advanced to the second round. In the second round the first and fourth seeds and the second and third seeds competed in an additional two-game, total goal series with the winners of each being declared as co-conference champions.

=== Conference standings ===
Note: GP = Games played; W = Wins; L = Losses; T = Ties; PTS = Points; GF = Goals For; GA = Goals Against

1978–79 Western Collegiate Hockey Association standings
	Conference							Overall					
	GP	W	L	T	PTS	GF	GA	GP	W	L	T	GF	GA
North Dakota†*	32	22	10	0	44	168	110	42	30	11	1	245	144
Minnesota*	32	20	11	1	41	177	116	44	32	11	1	239	147
Minnesota-Duluth	32	18	10	4	40	176	141	40	22	14	4	213	170
Wisconsin	32	19	11	2	40	164	138	41	25	13	3	215	172
Notre Dame	32	17	14	1	35	161	153	38	18	19	1	184	196
Denver	32	14	16	2	30	147	174	43	20	20	3	188	217
Michigan Tech	32	13	16	3	29	152	141	38	17	18	3	182	165
Colorado College	32	11	19	2	24	144	185	38	12	24	2	165	218
Michigan State	32	12	20	0	24	122	180	36	15	21	0	140	192
Michigan	32	6	25	1	13	117	190	36	8	27	1	132	210
Championship: Minnesota, North Dakota † indicates conference regular season champion * indicates conference tournament champion

== Bracket ==
Teams are reseeded after the first round

First Round; March 6–7
1	North Dakota	6	7
8	Colorado College	3	3
2	Minnesota	5	6
7	Michigan Tech	3	1
3	Minnesota-Duluth	5	2*
6	Denver	2	4
4	Wisconsin	11	5
5	Notre Dame	5	5

Second Round; March 10–11
1	North Dakota	4	7
4	Wisconsin	2	7
2	Minnesota	2	6
3	Minnesota-Duluth	1	3

Note: * denotes overtime period(s)

=== First round ===
==== (1) North Dakota vs. (8) Colorado College ====
March 6	North Dakota	6 – 3	Colorado College	Winter Sports Center

March 7	North Dakota	7 – 3	Colorado College	Winter Sports Center

North Dakota won series 13–6

==== (2) Minnesota vs. (7) Michigan Tech ====
March 6	Minnesota	5 – 3	Michigan Tech	Williams Arena

March 7	Minnesota	6 – 1	Michigan Tech	Williams Arena

Minnesota won series 11–4

==== (3) Minnesota-Duluth vs. (6) Denver ====
March 6	Minnesota-Duluth	5 – 2	Denver	Duluth Arena Auditorium

March 7	Minnesota-Duluth	2 – 4	OT	Denver	Duluth Arena Auditorium

Minnesota-Duluth won series 7–6

==== (4) Wisconsin vs. (5) Notre Dame ====
March 6	Wisconsin	11 – 5	Notre Dame	Dane County Coliseum

March 7	Wisconsin	5 – 5	Notre Dame	Dane County Coliseum

Wisconsin won series 16–10

=== Second round ===
==== (1) North Dakota vs. (4) Wisconsin ====
March 10	North Dakota	4 – 2	Wisconsin	Winter Sports Center

March 11	North Dakota	7 – 7	Wisconsin	Winter Sports Center

North Dakota won series 11–9

==== (2) Minnesota vs. (3) Minnesota-Duluth ====
March 10	Minnesota	2 – 1	Minnesota-Duluth	Williams Arena

March 11	Minnesota	6 – 3	Minnesota-Duluth	Williams Arena

Minnesota won series 8–4

== Tournament awards ==
None

== See also ==
- Western Collegiate Hockey Association men's champions
