= Steve Ulseth =

American ice hockey player

- Born: February 22, 1959 (age 67) Roseville, Minnesota, U.S.
- Height: 5 ft 9 in (175 cm)
- Weight: 176 lb (80 kg; 12 st 8 lb)
- Position: Left wing
- Played for: Springfield Indians (AHL); Tulsa Oilers (CHL); Peoria Prancers (IHL)
- NHL draft: Undrafted
- Playing career: 1981–1983

Steve Ulseth (born February 22, 1959) is an American former professional ice hockey player.

== Early life ==
From 1977 to 1981, Ulseth played college hockey with the Minnesota Golden Gophers, scoring 84 goals and 118 assists for 202 points, while earning 48 penalty minutes, in 148 games played. In his senior year, he was recognized for his outstanding play when he was named the WCHA Most Valuable Player and was selected as a finalist for the 1981 Hobey Baker Award.

== Career ==
Ulseth went on to play the 1981–82 season with the Springfield Indians of the American Hockey League, and then played the 1982–83 season with the Tulsa Oilers and Peoria Prancers before retiring from professional hockey.

Ulseth is now employed as a sales representative for Miken hockey sticks.

== Career statistics ==
			Regular season					Playoffs
Season	Team	League	GP	G	A	Pts	PIM	GP	G	A	Pts	PIM
1977–78	University of Minnesota	NCAA	31	8	15	23	6	—	—	—	—	—
1978–79	University of Minnesota	NCAA	37	8	18	26	12	—	—	—	—	—
1979–80	University of Minnesota	NCAA	35	27	33	60	12	—	—	—	—	—
1980–81	University of Minnesota	NCAA	45	41	52	93	18	—	—	—	—	—
1981–82	Springfield Indians	AHL	43	6	14	20	0	—	—	—	—	—
1982–83	Tulsa Oilers	CHL	4	0	0	0	0	—	—	—	—	—
1982–83	Peoria Prancers	IHL	6	3	3	6	0	—	—	—	—	—
AHL totals			43	6	14	20	0	—	—	—	—	—
CHL totals			4	0	0	0	0	—	—	—	—	—
IHL totals			6	3	3	6	0	—	—	—	—	—

== Awards and honors ==
Honors	Year
All-WCHA First Team	1980–81
WCHA Most Valuable Player	1980–81

Awards and achievements
Preceded by Tim Harrer	WCHA Most Valuable Player; 1980–81	Succeeded by Phil Sykes
