= Detroit Olympia =

Former arena in Detroit

- "The Old Red Barn"
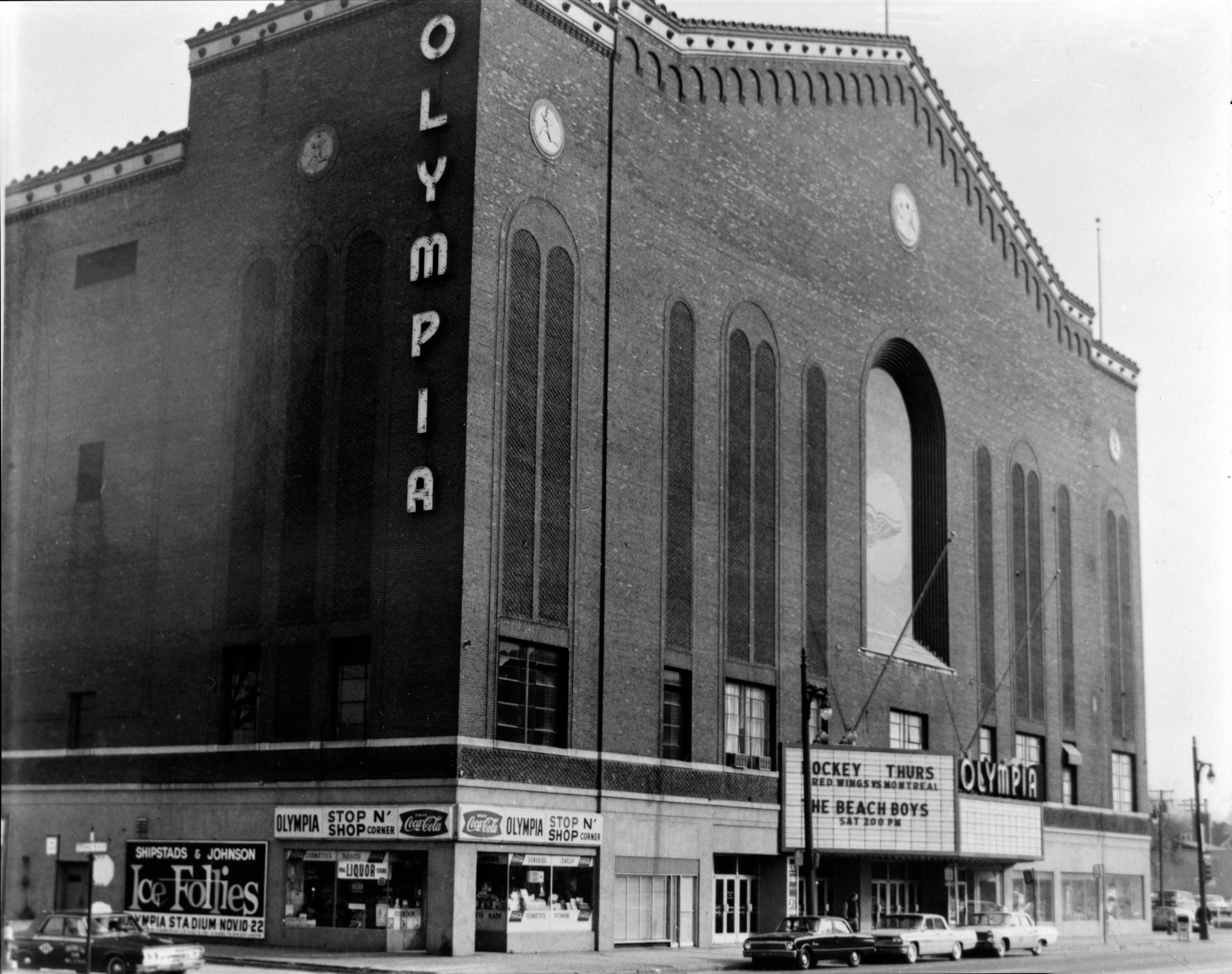
- Detroit Olympia in November 1964
- Interactive map of Detroit Olympia
- Address: 5920 Grand River Avenue
- Location: Detroit, Michigan
- Coordinates: 42°21′16″N 83°6′2″W
- Owner: Detroit Red Wings (Olympia Stadium Corporation)
- Capacity: 15,000

Construction
- Groundbreaking: March 8, 1927
- Opened: October 15, 1927
- Closed: February 21, 1980
- Demolished: July 10, 1986
- Cost: US$2.5 million ($46.3 million in 2025 dollars)
- Architect: C. Howard Crane
- General contractor: Walbridge Aldinger Co.

Tenants
- Detroit Cougars/Falcons/Red Wings (NHL) (1927–1979); Detroit Olympics (CPHL/IHL) (1927–1936); Detroit Falcons (BAA) (1946–1947); Detroit Pistons (NBA) (1957–1961)

Detroit Olympia, also known as Olympia Stadium, was a multi-purpose arena in Detroit. Nicknamed "The Old Red Barn", it was best known as the home of the Detroit Red Wings of the National Hockey League (NHL) from its opening in 1927 to 1979.

== History ==
Several Detroit businessmen organized the Detroit Hockey Club, Inc. in 1926 and purchased the Victoria Cougars hockey team, along with a site at the corner of Grand River Avenue and McGraw Street. The group engaged Detroit-based Walbridge Aldinger as general contractor to build the arena. In July 1926, the Detroit Hockey Club unveiled drawings for the Olympia Stadium to be built on the site. The cornerstone for the building was laid by Mayor John W. Smith on March 8, 1927.

The Olympia opened on October 15, 1927; at that time, the only other buildings that exceeded its seating capacity were Madison Square Garden and the London Olympia. The opening event was the International Stampede and Rodeo, which ran from October 15 to October 22. Shortly thereafter, the primary tenants of the building, the NHL Cougars, began their long residence. The Cougars played their first game at the Olympia on November 22, 1927, and Detroit's Johnny Sheppard scored the first goal at the new building. However, the visiting Ottawa Senators defeated the Cougars, 2–1. The Cougars later became the Falcons and finally, in 1932, were named the Detroit Red Wings by new owner James E. Norris.

In addition to the Red Wings, the Olympia was also home to the Detroit Olympics International Hockey League minor league team in the 1930s, the BAA's Detroit Falcons from 1946 to 1947, and the NBA's Detroit Pistons from 1957 to 1961; that period marked the only time until the opening of Little Caesars Arena in 2017 that the Red Wings and Pistons shared the same arena on a full-time basis.

On some occasions, the Detroit Falcons also allowed the Detroit Gems from the rival National Basketball League to play in the arena as well as a part of certain doubleheader match-ups that the Falcons and the BAA hosted during the only season both of those franchises existed. It also hosted the NHL All-Star Game in 1950, 1952, 1954, and 1955, the NBA All-Star Game in 1959 and the NCAA Men's Ice Hockey Championship (known as the "Frozen Four") in 1977 and 1979.

The Olympia was also a major venue for boxing through the International Boxing Club, featuring such prominent fights as Jake LaMotta's February 1943 defeat of Sugar Ray Robinson, and Robinson's victory in their rematch three weeks later. Olympia also hosted professional wrestling matches, as well as other events such as the 1931 American Legion Convention which was addressed by President Herbert Hoover, and regular visits by the Harlem Globetrotters, Ice Capades, Shipstads and Johnson Ice Follies. It hosted concerts by The Beatles on September 6, 1964, and August 13, 1966, as well as concerts by other popular performers and bands, including Kiss, Led Zeppelin and Elvis Presley.

By the late 1970s, the neighborhood surrounding the Olympia had been in decline since the 1967 riots. In 1977, the Red Wings announced that they would be moving to a proposed arena in suburban Pontiac. The city of Detroit countered with a proposed riverfront arena for much less rent that Pontiac was seeking. The package included operational control of both the new arena, nearby Cobo Arena and the adjoining parking structures. The Red Wings accepted Detroit's offer.

On December 15, 1979, three days after the first event held at Joe Louis Arena, the Red Wings played their final home game at the Olympia, a 4–4 tie against the Quebec Nordiques. Attendance at that game was 15,609. They moved to Joe Louis Arena on December 27. The final event at the building took place on February 21, 1980. It was demolished on July 10, 1986. Currently, the Michigan National Guard's Olympia Armory occupies the site. A historical marker posted inside the armory commemorates the Olympia.

The original OLYMPIA letters that adorned the sides of the building were placed into storage at Joe Louis Arena, then installed in Little Caesars Arena in 2017, which became the new home for the Red Wings.

== Architecture ==
The building was 107 feet (32.6 m) tall and constructed of a steel frame faced with red brick with brown terra cotta and stone trim in a Romanesque Revival style. The Grand River and McGraw facades originally included 13 storefronts. Near the parapet were terra cotta medallions depicting various athletes. When it opened, Olympia contained the largest indoor skating rink in the United States at 242 ft (74 m) by 110 ft (34 m).

The Grand River facade featured three-story arched windows with a large recessed arch in the center. The large arch originally was filled with black glass. However, in later years, it was covered with wood, painted with the Red Wings emblem. Topping the facade was a pediment creating a gable-shaped roof.

The arena had five levels. The ground level through which patrons entered and featured a concourse that circled the seating area. Above were the mezzanine, main seating level and balcony. A fifth level not open to the public was just under the roof trusses. The trusses spanned 186 ft (57 m) and were 90 ft (27 m) above the floor.

The initial seating capacity was 11,563. In 1965, work began to add 81 ft (25 m) to the rear of the structure. The addition was four stories high and included additional seating and an escalator to improve patron access to the upper levels. As a result, the capacity was expanded to 13,000 with standing room for 3,000 during hockey games. In addition to the new seats, the original 11,563 seats were replaced at a cost of $23 each and new boards and timeclocks were installed.

While not one of the most decorative, architect C. Howard Crane considered Olympia to be one of his most significant buildings. He noted the importance of the refrigeration system buried beneath the concrete. Within the 77,393 square feet (7,190.0 m^{2}) of available floor space were 74,880 ft (22,820 m) of piping. The system was replaced in 1967 and the final modification to the building was the addition of private boxes in 1970.

== Arena plans ==
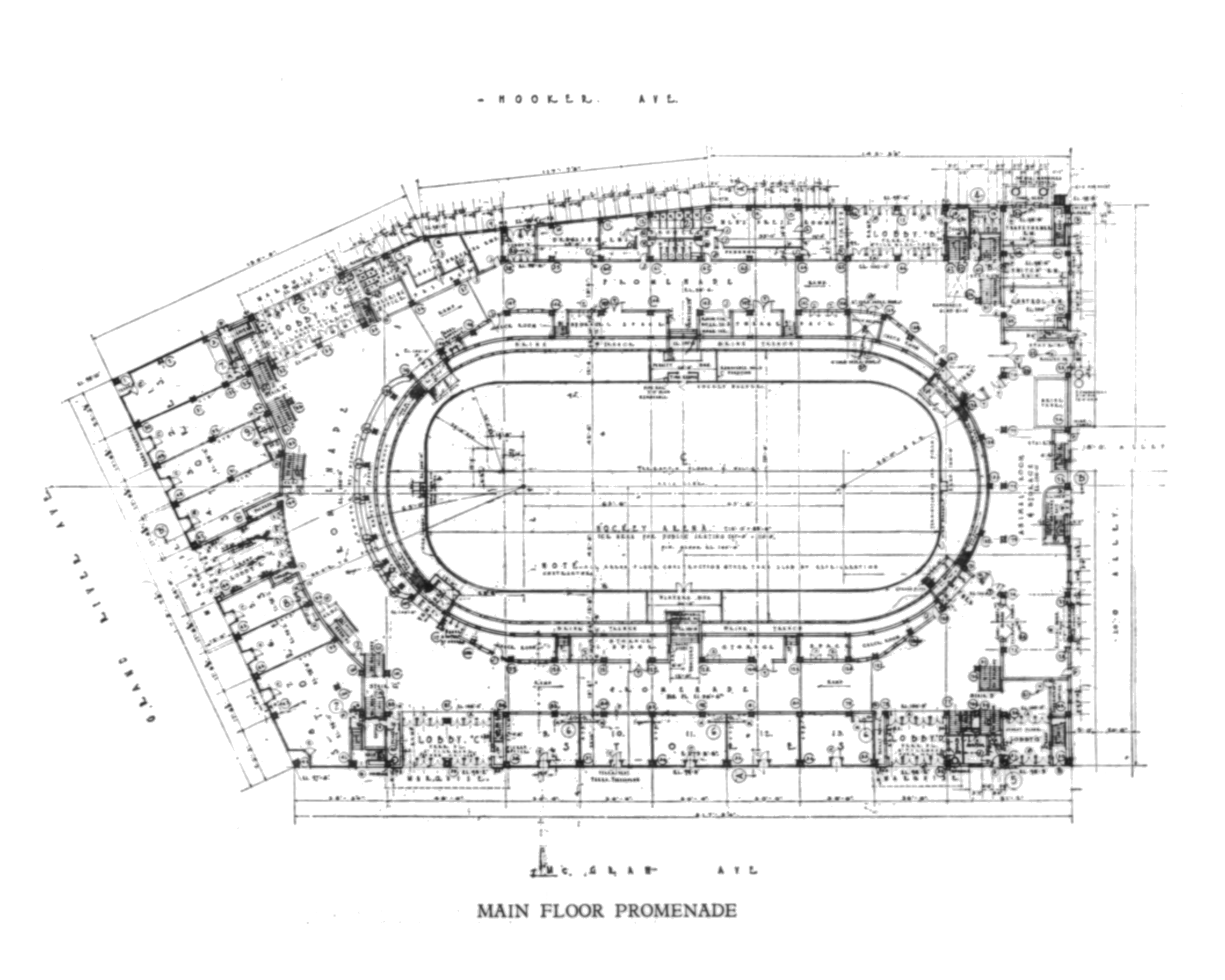
Main floor

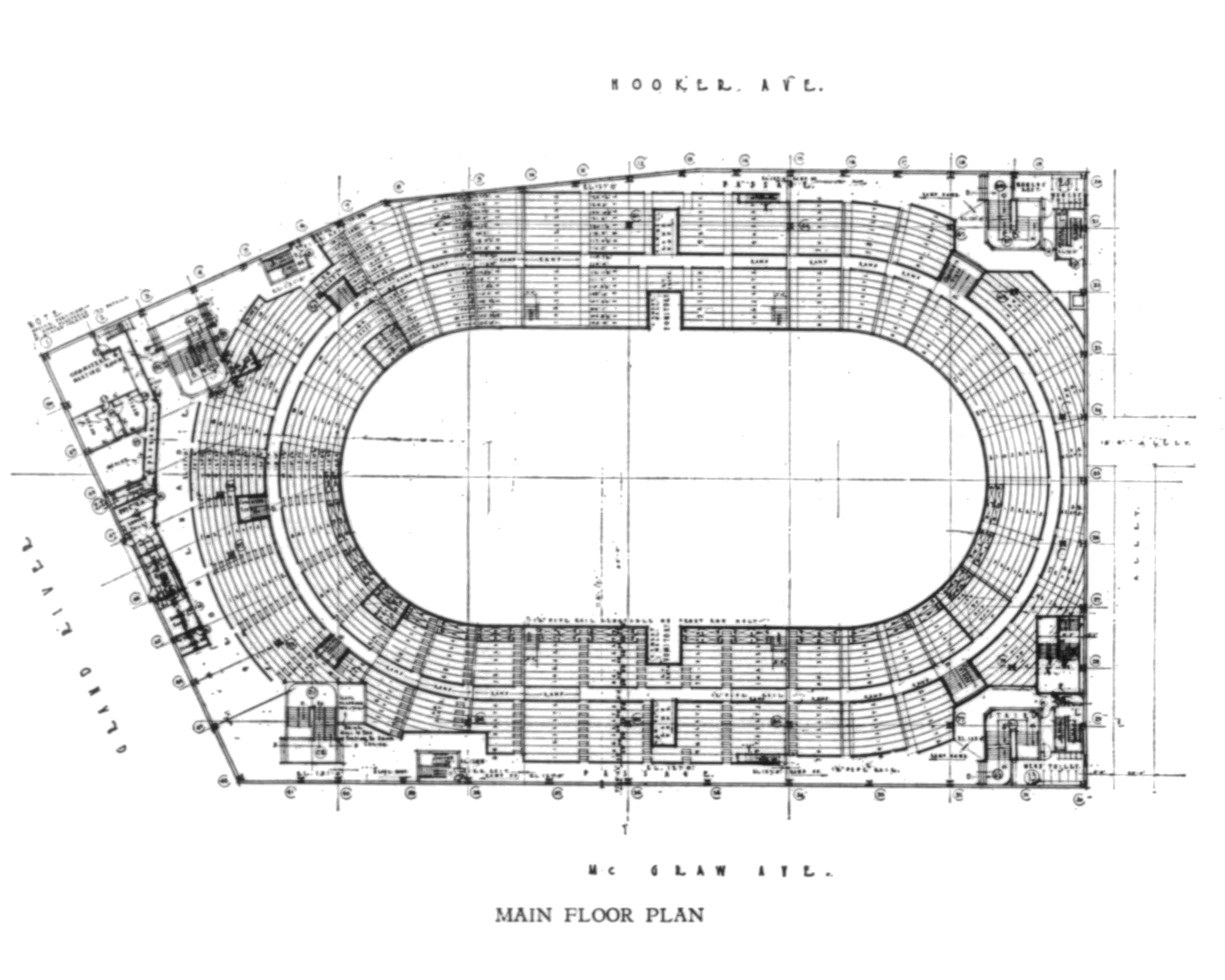
Bleachers

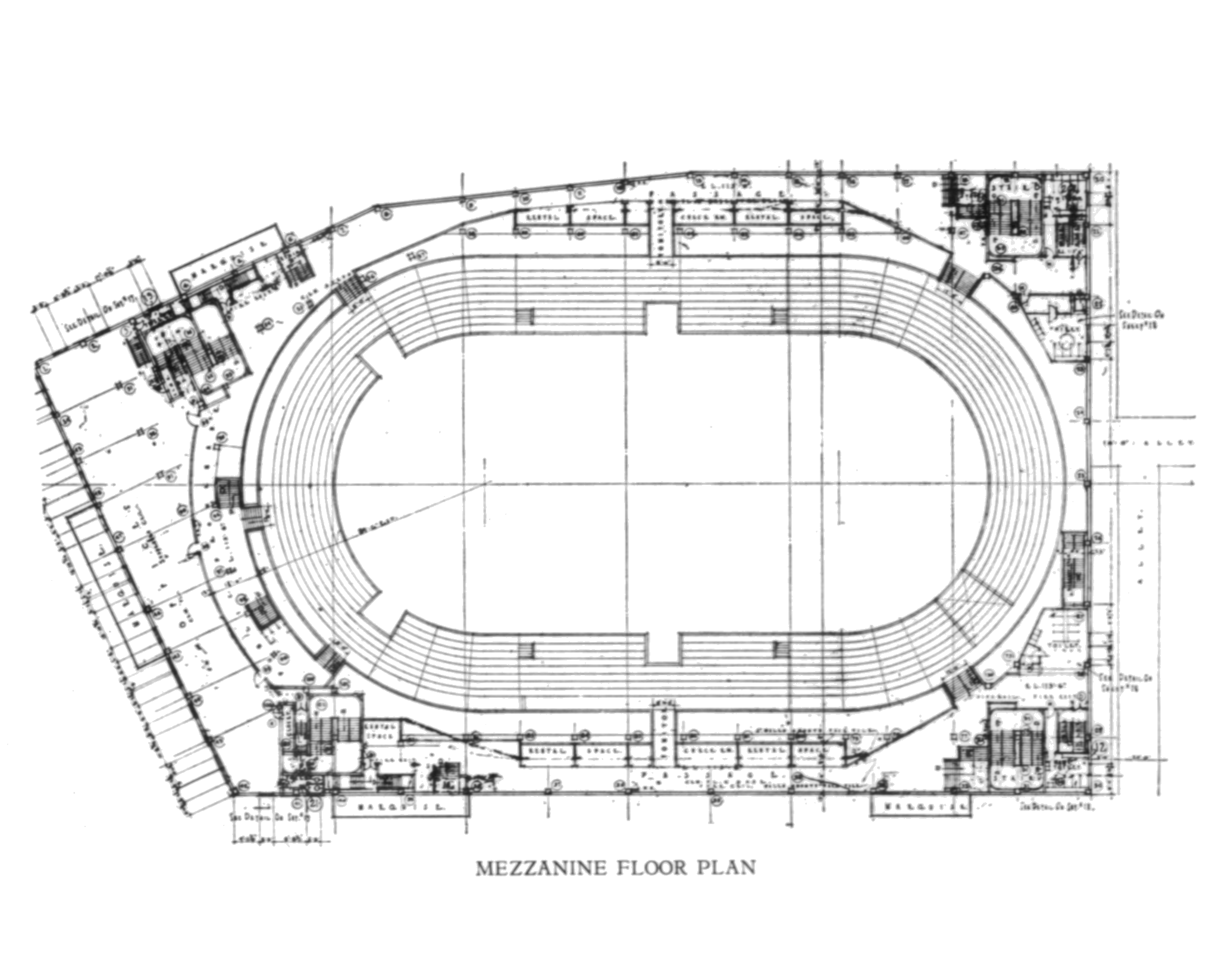
Mezzanine

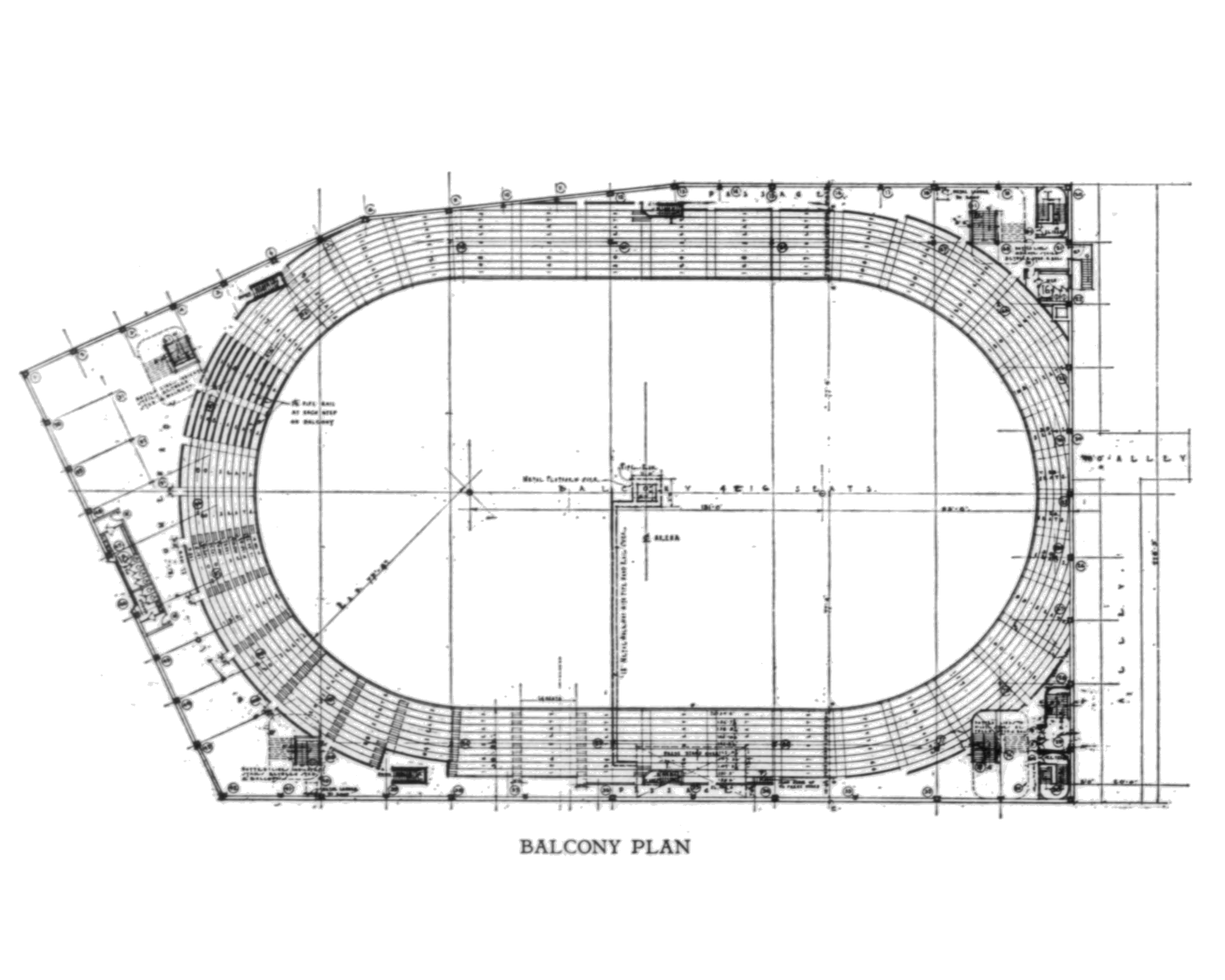
Balcony

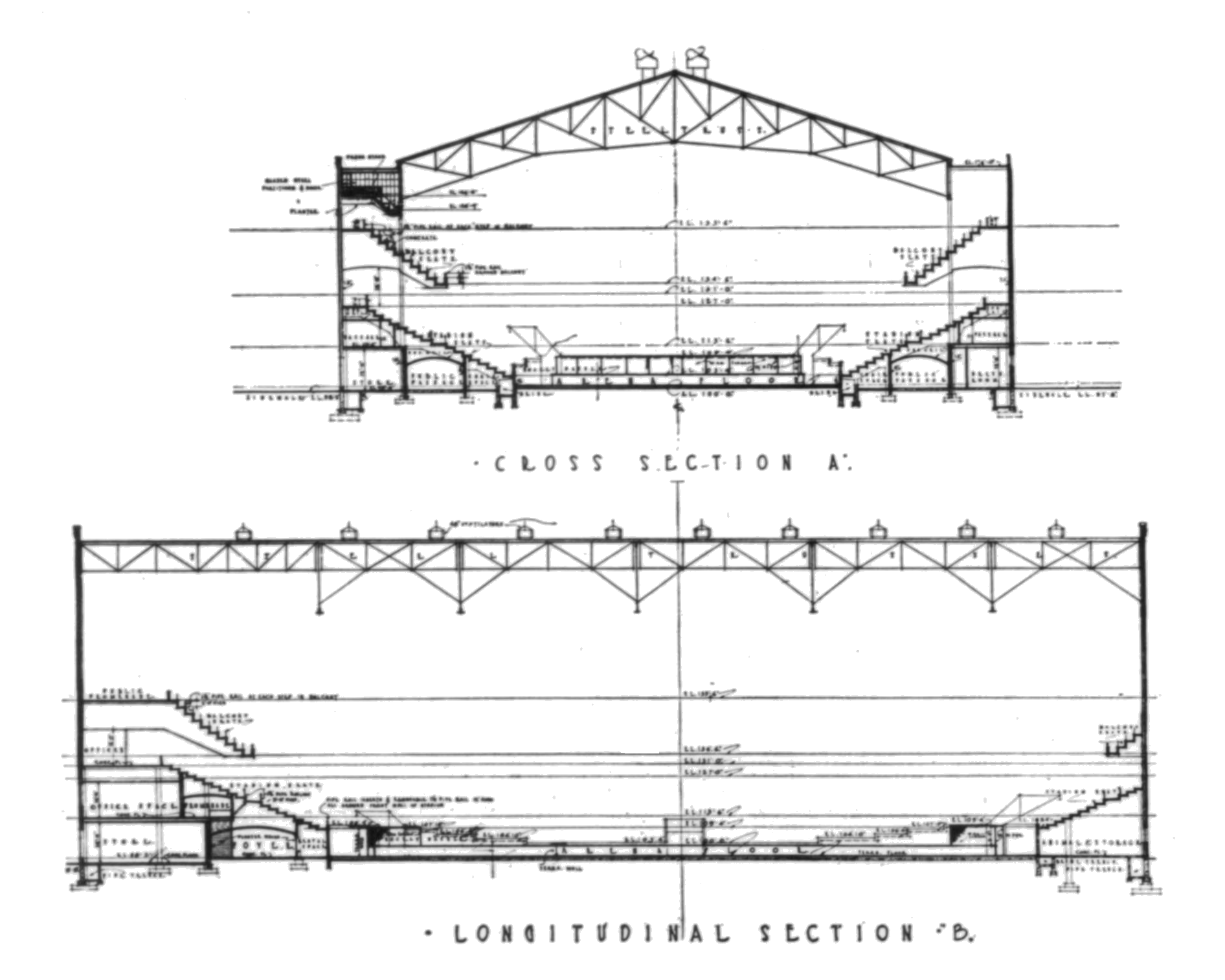
Sections

Events and tenants
Preceded by Border Cities Arena	Home of the Detroit Cougars/Falcons/Red Wings; 1927 – 1979	Succeeded by Joe Louis Arena
Preceded by War Memorial Coliseum	Home of the Detroit Pistons; 1957 – 1961	Succeeded by Cobo Arena
Preceded by First Arena	Home of the Detroit Olympics; 1929 – 1936	Succeeded by Duquesne Gardens (Pittsburgh Hornets)
Preceded by Maple Leaf Gardens; Maple Leaf Gardens; Montreal Forum	Host of the NHL All-Star Game; 1950; 1952; 1954–1955	Succeeded by Maple Leaf Gardens; Montreal Forum; Montreal Forum
Preceded by Kiel Auditorium	Host of the NBA All-Star Game; 1959	Succeeded by Convention Hall
Preceded by University of Denver Arena; Denver, Colorado	Host of the men's Frozen Four; 1977	Succeeded by Providence Civic Center; Providence, Rhode Island
Preceded by Providence Civic Center; Providence, Rhode Island	Host of the men's Frozen Four; 1979	Succeeded by Providence Civic Center; Providence, Rhode Island
