= 1978–79 NCAA Division I men's ice hockey season =

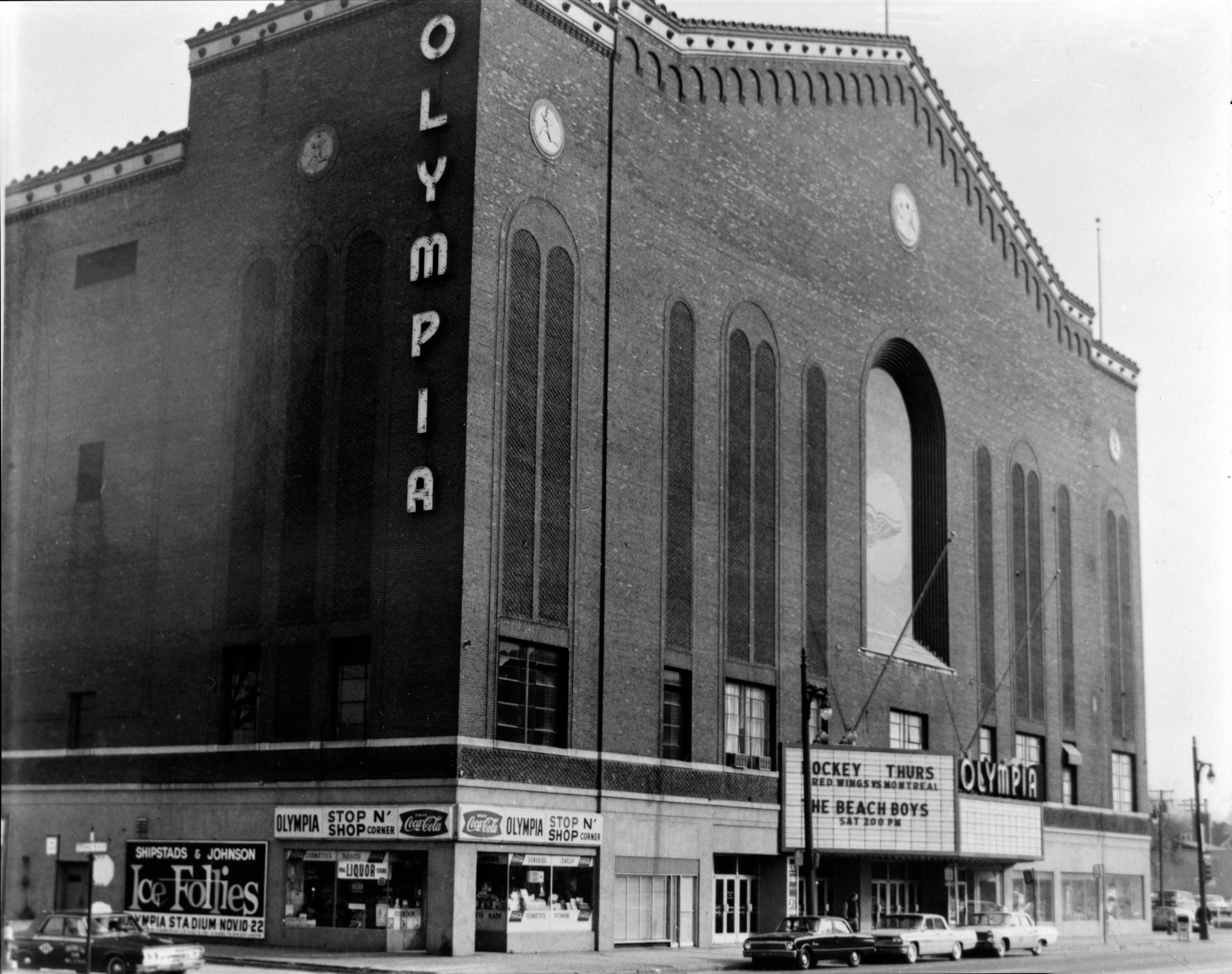
- The Olympia Stadium served as the host for the 1979 Frozen Four
- Duration: October 1978– March 24, 1979
- NCAA tournament: 1979
- National championship: Olympia Stadium; Detroit, Michigan
- NCAA champion: Minnesota

The 1978–79 NCAA Division I men's ice hockey season began in October 1978 and concluded with the 1979 NCAA Division I Men's Ice Hockey Tournament's championship game on March 24, 1979 at the Olympia Stadium in Detroit, Michigan. This was the 32nd season in which an NCAA ice hockey championship was held and is the 85th year overall where an NCAA school fielded a team.

== Season Outlook ==
=== Pre-season poll ===
The top teams in the nation voted on by coaches before the start of the season. The poll was compiled by radio station WMPL.

WMPL Poll
Rank	Team
1	Minnesota
2	Boston University
3 (tie)	Denver
3 (tie)	North Dakota
5	Wisconsin
6	Bowling Green
7 (tie)	Boston College
7 (tie)	Cornell
9	Notre Dame
10	Minnesota Duluth

== Regular season ==
=== Season tournaments ===
Tournament	Dates	Teams	Champion
North Country Thanksgiving Festival	November 24–25	4	Clarkson
Pacific Rim Tournament	December 7–13	3	Alberta
Union Holiday Festival Tournament	December 15–16	4	Colgate
Cornell Holiday Festival	December 28–29	4	Cornell
Broadmoor World Tournament	December 28–30	3	Soviet Traktor
Old Colony Invitational	December 28–30	4	Bowling Green
Rensselaer Holiday Tournament	December 28–30	4	St. Lawrence
Great Lakes Invitational	December 29–30	4	Michigan Tech
Auld Lang Syne Classic	December 30–31	4	Dartmouth
Yale Invitational	January 5–6	4	New Hampshire
Beanpot	February 5, 12	4	Boston University

=== Standings ===
1978–79 Big Ten standings
	Conference							Overall					
	GP	W	L	T	PTS	GF	GA	GP	W	L	T	GF	GA
Minnesota†	12	10	2	0	20	80	43	44	32	11	1	239	147
Wisconsin	12	8	4	0	16	73	50	41	25	13	3	215	172
Michigan	12	3	9	0	6	43	75	36	8	27	1	132	210
Michigan State	12	3	9	0	6	46	77	36	15	21	0	140	192
† indicates conference regular season champion

1978–79 Central Collegiate Hockey Association standings
	Conference							Overall					
	GP	W	L	T	PTS	GF	GA	GP	W	L	T	GF	GA
Bowling Green†*	24	21	2	1	43	142	54	45	37	6	2	179	113
Ohio State	24	15	8	1	31	126	101	40	25	13	2	218	170
Northern Michigan	24	13	10	1	27	109	93	34	19	13	2	168	126
Lake Superior State	24	11	12	1	23	118	112	36	16	18	2	164	181
Saint Louis	24	9	13	2	20	104	137	35	16	16	3	174	189
Western Michigan	24	8	16	0	16	116	142	36	17	19	0	171	182
Ferris State‡	24	4	20	0	8	87	163	34	10	24	0	155	217
Championship: Bowling Green † indicates conference regular season champion * indicates conference tournament champion ‡ Ferris State was still considered a member of the NAIA

1978–79 ECAC Hockey standings
	Conference							Overall					
	GP	W	L	T	Pct.	GF	GA	GP	W	L	T	GF	GA
Boston University†	23	17	4	2	.783	101	76	30	21	7	2	138	106
New Hampshire*	25	17	5	3	.740	151	103	35	22	10	3	203	148
Cornell	22	16	6	0	.727	129	88	29	21	8	0	166	114
Dartmouth	22	14	7	1	.659	104	78	30	19	9	2	144	102
Clarkson	22	13	9	0	.591	135	106	31	19	12	0	184	136
Providence	24	13	9	2	.583	105	102	28	16	10	2	134	123
Yale	22	12	9	1	.568	105	91	27	13	12	2	129	125
Vermont	21	11	10	0	.524	97	98	30	12	18	0	122	141
Northeastern	22	11	11	0	.500	94	107	27	12	15	0	112	129
Brown	21	10	11	0	.476	86	89	25	11	14	0	105	108
Boston College	22	10	12	0	.455	106	112	30	16	14	0	167	141
Colgate	20	7	13	0	.350	97	124	28	15	13	0	166	144
Rensselaer	25	8	16	1	.340	124	136	28	10	17	1	141	145
Harvard	22	5	16	1	.250	86	109	26	7	18	1	108	131
St. Lawrence	24	5	18	1	.229	81	132	31	8	21	2	118	162
Princeton	21	2	15	4	.190	71	119	26	5	17	4	95	138
Championship: New Hampshire † indicates conference regular season champion * indicates conference tournament champion

1978–79 NCAA Division I Independent ice hockey standings
	Conference							Overall					
	GP	W	L	T	PTS	GF	GA	GP	W	L	T	GF	GA
Air Force	0	0	0	0	-	-	-	31	18	12	1	157	139
Miami	0	0	0	0	-	-	-	37	22	14	1	257	145

1978–79 Western Collegiate Hockey Association standings
	Conference							Overall					
	GP	W	L	T	PTS	GF	GA	GP	W	L	T	GF	GA
North Dakota†*	32	22	10	0	44	168	110	42	30	11	1	245	144
Minnesota*	32	20	11	1	41	177	116	44	32	11	1	239	147
Minnesota-Duluth	32	18	10	4	40	176	141	40	22	14	4	213	170
Wisconsin	32	19	11	2	40	164	138	41	25	13	3	215	172
Notre Dame	32	17	14	1	35	161	153	38	18	19	1	184	196
Denver	32	14	16	2	30	147	174	43	20	20	3	188	217
Michigan Tech	32	13	16	3	29	152	141	38	17	18	3	182	165
Colorado College	32	11	19	2	24	144	185	38	12	24	2	165	218
Michigan State	32	12	20	0	24	122	180	36	15	21	0	140	192
Michigan	32	6	25	1	13	117	190	36	8	27	1	132	210
Championship: Minnesota, North Dakota † indicates conference regular season champion * indicates conference tournament champion

=== Final regular season polls ===
The final top 10 teams as ranked by coaches (WMPL) before the conference tournament finals.

WMPL Coaches Poll
Ranking	Team
1	North Dakota
2	Bowling Green State
3	Minnesota
4	Boston University
5	New Hampshire
6	Minnesota Duluth
7	Wisconsin
8	Cornell
9	Ohio State
10	Dartmouth

== 1979 NCAA Tournament ==
First round March 18
W2	Minnesota	6
A	Bowling Green	3

Semifinals; March 22–23
E1	New Hampshire	3
W2	Minnesota	4
W1	North Dakota	4
E2	Dartmouth	2

National championship March 24
W2	Minnesota	4
W1	North Dakota	3
Third-place game
E1	New Hampshire	3
E2	Dartmouth	7

Note: * denotes overtime period(s)

== Player stats ==
=== Scoring leaders ===
The following players led the league in points at the conclusion of the season.

GP = Games played; G = Goals; A = Assists; Pts = Points; PIM = Penalty minutes

Player	Class	Team	GP	G	A	Pts	PIM
Mark Johnson	Junior	Wisconsin	40	41	49	90	34
George McPhee	Freshman	Bowling Green	43	40	48	88	58
Dave Delich	Senior	Colorado College	36	32	52	84	26
Mark Wells	Senior	Bowling Green	45	26	57	83	30
Mark Taylor	Junior	North Dakota	42	24	59	83	28
Kevin Maxwell	Freshman	North Dakota	42	31	51	82	79
John Markell	Senior	Bowling Green	42	31	49	80	96
Mark Pavelich	Junior	Minnesota–Duluth	37	31	48	79	52
Steve Christoff	Junior	Minnesota	43	38	39	77	50
Paul Tilley	Junior	Ohio State	39	32	44	76	55

=== Leading goaltenders ===
The following goaltenders led the league in goals against average at the end of the regular season while playing at least 33% of their team's total minutes.

GP = Games played; Min = Minutes played; W = Wins; L = Losses; OT = Overtime/shootout losses; GA = Goals against; SO = Shutouts; SV% = Save percentage; GAA = Goals against average

Player	Class	Team	GP	Min	W	L	OT	GA	SO	SV%	GAA
Wally Charko	Sophomore	Bowling Green	39	2307	32	-	-	92	-	.914	2.39
Bob Iwabuchi	Freshman	North Dakota	22	1274	-	-	-	61	1	.907	2.74
Dan Kodatsky	Freshman	Miami	-	-	-	-	-	-	-	-	2.82
Bob Gaudet	Sophomore	Dartmouth	23	1385	-	-	-	70	2	.896	3.03
Rick Mills	Freshman	Clarkson	14	706	-	-	-	38	0	.893	3.23
Steve Janaszak	Senior	Minnesota	41	2428	29	11	1	131	1	.895	3.23
Steve Weeks	Junior	Northern Michigan	25	1437	13	8	2	82	0	.902	3.42
Jim Craig	Junior	Boston University	19	1009	13	4	2	60	1	-	3.57
Mel Donnelly	Junior	North Dakota	10	561	-	-	-	34	0	.881	3.66
Greg Moffett	Sophomore	New Hampshire	31	1431	21	-	-	89	0	.892	3.73

== Awards ==
=== NCAA ===
Award		Recipient
Spencer Penrose Award		Charlie Holt, New Hampshire
Most Outstanding Player in NCAA Tournament		Steve Janaszak, Minnesota
AHCA All-American Teams
East Team	Position	West Team
Jim Craig, Boston University	G	Bob Iwabuchi, North Dakota
Louis Cote, Vermont	D	Bill Baker, Minnesota
Jack O'Callahan, Boston University	D	Curt Giles, Minnesota-Duluth
Ralph Cox, New Hampshire	F	Mark Johnson, Wisconsin
Joe Mullen, Boston College	F	Kevin Maxwell, North Dakota
Lance Nethery, Cornell	F	Mark Pavelich, Minnesota-Duluth

=== CCHA ===
Award		Recipient
Player of the Year		Ken Morrow, Bowling Green
Rookie of the Year		George McPhee, Bowling Green
Coach of the Year		Ron Mason, Bowling Green
All-CCHA Teams
First Team	Position	Second Team
Wally Charko, Bowling Green	G	Steve Jones, Ohio State
	G	Murray Skinner, Lake Superior State
	G	Steve Weeks, Northern Michigan
Ken Morrow, Bowling Green	D	George Kryzer, Saint Louis
Tom Laidlaw, Northern Michigan	D	Doug Butler, Saint Louis
Paul Tilley, Ohio State	F	George McPhee, Bowling Green
John Markell, Bowling Green	F	Chris Valentine, Saint Louis
Mark Wells, Bowling Green	F	Ron Sandzik, Lake Superior State

=== ECAC ===
Award		Recipient
Player of the Year		Ralph Cox, New Hampshire
Rookie of the Year		Bill Whelton, Boston University
Most Outstanding Player in Tournament		Greg Moffett, New Hampshire
All-ECAC Hockey Teams
First Team	Position	Second Team
Jim Craig, Boston University	G	Greg Moffett, New Hampshire
Louis Cote, Vermont	D	Jim Korn, Providence
Jack O'Callahan, Boston University	D	Mike Mastrullo, Brown
Joe Mullen, Boston College	F	Bob Gould, New Hampshire
Lance Nethery, Cornell	F	Brock Tredway, Cornell
Ralph Cox, New Hampshire	F	Colin Ahern, Providence

=== WCHA ===
Award		Recipient
Most Valuable Player		Mark Johnson, Wisconsin
Freshman of the Year		Kevin Maxwell, North Dakota
Coach of the Year		Gino Gasparini, North Dakota
All-WCHA Teams
First Team	Position	Second Team
Bob Iwabuchi, North Dakota	G	John Rockwell, Michigan Tech
Curt Giles, Minnesota-Duluth	D	Bob Suter, Wisconsin
Bill Baker, Minnesota	D	Dave Feamster, Colorado College
Mark Pavelich, Minnesota-Duluth	F	Gord Salt, Michigan Tech
Mark Johnson, Wisconsin	F	Dave Delich, Colorado College
Kevin Maxwell, North Dakota	F	Steve Christoff, Minnesota

== 1979 NHL entry draft ==
Round	Pick	Player	College	Conference	NHL team
1	11	Mike Ramsey	Minnesota	WCHA	Buffalo Sabres
2	40	Dave Christian	North Dakota	WCHA	Winnipeg Jets
3	42	Neal Broten	Minnesota	WCHA	Minnesota North Stars
3	61	Bill Whelton	Boston University	ECAC Hockey	Winnipeg Jets
3	63	Kevin Maxwell	North Dakota	WCHA	Minnesota North Stars
4	69	Glenn Anderson	Denver	WCHA	Edmonton Oilers
5	92	Jim Brown	Notre Dame	WCHA	Los Angeles Kings
5	97	Dan Makuch	Clarkson	ECAC Hockey	New York Rangers
6	113	Jay McFarlane	Wisconsin	WCHA	Los Angeles Kings
6	114	Bill McCreary	Colgate	ECAC Hockey	Toronto Maple Leafs
6	115	Marc Chorney	North Dakota	WCHA	Pittsburgh Penguins
6	117	Glenn Johnson	Denver	WCHA	Atlanta Flames
6	121	Greg Moffett	New Hampshire	ECAC Hockey	Montreal Canadiens
6	122	John Gibb	Bowling Green	CCHA	New York Islanders
6	123	Dave McDonald ^{‡}	Minnesota–Duluth	WCHA	New England Whalers
6	124	Tim Watters	Michigan Tech	WCHA	Winnipeg Jets

† incoming freshman
‡ McDonald had left school mid-season.

== See also ==
- 1978–79 NCAA Division II men's ice hockey season
- 1978–79 NCAA Division III men's ice hockey season
