= 1974–75 Michigan Tech Huskies men's ice hockey season =

National champion Great Lakes Invitational, champion WCHA Tournament, co-champion 1975 NCAA Tournament, champion
- Conference: 2nd WCHA
- Home ice: Student Ice Arena

Record
- Overall: 32–10–0
- Conference: 22–10–0
- Home: 17–5–0
- Road: 11–5–0
- Neutral: 4–0–0

Coaches and captains
- Head coach: John MacInnes
- Assistant coaches: Glen Weller; Rick Yeo
- Captain: Bob Lorimer
- Alternate captain(s): Bill Steele; Bob D'Alvise; Bruce Abbey

The 1974–75 Michigan Tech Huskies men's ice hockey team represented Michigan Tech University in college ice hockey. In its 19th year under head coach John MacInnes the team compiled a 32–10–0 record and reached the NCAA tournament for the fourth time in its history. The Huskies defeated Minnesota 6–1 in the championship game at the St. Louis Arena in St. Louis, Missouri, a rematch of the previous season's championship game.

== Season ==
=== Streaking ===
After coming up just shy in 1973–74 Michigan Tech entered the season with one goal; winning the national championship. Jim Warden, as the only goaltender on the team who wasn't a freshman, was given the opportunity to assume control of the Huskies' crease and played well at the start. With MTU's high-powered offense clicking the Huskies easily won their first four games, outscoring the opposition by a 27–13 margin, winning each contest by at least 3 goals. However, when Tech met their first tough competition they hit a rough patch. Over a three-week span, despite playing four of six contests at home, the Huskies lost five of six games, all against WCHA opponents. Michigan Tech was able to score in most games but their defense surrendered no less than four goals in each match. The losing streak left Tech with a .500 record overall and a 3–5 mark in conference; disastrous numbers for a team hoping to challenge for a national title.

Warden and the defensive corps led by team captain Bob Lorimer needed to raise their game and the weekend series against three week conference opponents couldn't have come at a better time. A six-game winning streak countered their losing skid and the Huskies were back in contention for home ice in the WCHA Tournament. Just before the winter break Tech headed to Minneapolis to take on the defending national champions and saw their rise up the standings halted with two losses to Minnesota.

=== Holiday Season ===
At the end of December Michigan Tech made their way to Detroit and served as host for the 10th Great Lakes Invitational. The Huskies dominated Yale in the first game then squeezed past Michigan with a 3–2 win to capture their first GLI championship in three years. After two weeks off the Huskies resumed their schedule against the Wolverines and split the home series. The win came in the second match and provided Jim Warden with his first shutout of the season. After spending two weeks walking over bottom-feeders Denver and North Dakota Tech made their first appearance in the new Munn Ice Arena. The Huskies housewarming present was to defeat Michigan State twice and raise their record to 20–8.

=== Down the Stretch ===
Michigan Tech held its Winter Carnival at the beginning of February and played host to Minnesota–Duluth. After raising their winning streak to 8 games Tech lost the second contest which left them just two points ahead of Colorado College in the standings. After taking both games at Notre Dame Tech was shutout by Wisconsin before rebounding in the second match.

With only one weekend series remaining, Tech found itself tied with CC as both had identical 20–10 conference records. The Tigers were going to take on 9th-place Denver with the Huskies were faced with Minnesota, who had already won the WCHA championship and guaranteed themselves the top seed. The Gophers were flat in their first game, allowing Tech to easily take the contest 7–0 with Warden tying the school record with his third shutout of the season. CC lost their first game against the Pioneers so all Tech needed was a tie to get the second seed. In their second match Minnesota gave the Huskies all they had but Tech was able to pull out a 5–4 victory and give themselves home ice for the duration of the conference tournament.

=== Playoffs ===
Notre Dame arrived in Houghton for the first round of the conference playoffs just two days after the regular season wrapped up. While both teams were presumably tired the Huskies shut the Irish down, winning both games with Jim Warden setting anew program record with his fourth shutout of the season (still a Michigan Tech record as of 2019). The Huskies were able to rest for a day while both the 3rd- and 4th-seeded teams lost, leaving Michigan State as the Huskies opponent. While the Spartans only had a short way to travel from Madison, they were forced to play games on four consecutive nights while the Huskies were able to get a day off in between the two rounds. The tired Spartan defense was no match for Tech who put up 15 goals in the two games and won both to earn their second consecutive WCHA Tournament championship and 7th overall. Even more impressive was that Michigan Tech produced a 30-win season, only the second such occurrence in the history of college hockey (and the first of only two times they've accomplished that feat as of 2019).

Michigan Tech made their 8th NCAA Tournament appearance as the 2nd western due to Minnesota being the other WCHA winner. As a result, MTU was pitted against ECAC champion Boston University who had the offensive firepower to rival their own. The Terriers opened the scoring in the semifinal and the two teams traded leads in the opening frame before heading to the locker room tied 2-all. When the second period began the Huskies charged out of the gate and scored three times in under six minutes. BU was able to get one goal to close the gap but Bob D'Alvise' second goal of the game restored the 3-goal lead. with just under two minutes to play in the period Mike Fidler was called for a major high-sticking penalty, giving MTU a 5-minutes man-advantage. Bill Steele scored just 21 seconds into the power play while George Lyle and Mike Zuke added their own markers early in the third period. With the score 9–3 as a result the game was essentially over and though the Terriers netted two more before time expired the Huskies had proved themselves the better breed.

==== National championship ====
The championship game became a rematch of the previous year's finale with Tech looking for revenge against Minnesota. Interestingly enough, both Minnesota and Michigan Tech had entered the NCAA tournament as the first teams in 14 years to record 30 wins and with each having won their semifinal meetings both shared the record for the most wins in a season. That record, however, was secondary to the game itself. The two teams played before a crowd of nearly 7,000 people, far below the maximum capacity of the St. Louis Arena but much more than they were used to seeing. Michigan Tech scored first, just past the halfway mark of the opening frame and added a second from Zuke with 64 seconds remaining. Tech's defense held the Gophers to only 7 shots in the period and continued their stifling play throughout the game. The Huskies themselves were held to only 5 shots on goal in the second but they made them count, doubling their lead to 4–0 after forty minutes. The final period saw more of the same with the Huskies tying their own championship record with six consecutive goals from the start of the game. Minnesota's Tom Younghans finally got the puck past Jim Warden midway through the final period but by then it was too late and Michigan Tech won their third national championship as well as set a new NCAA record with 32 wins on the year.

With his almost shutout of the Gophers, Jim Warden was named as the tournament MOP and was joined on the All-Tournament Team by Bob Lorimer, Bob D'Alvise and Steve Jensen. D'Alvise finished third in the nation in scoring and was named to the AHCA All-American West Team. He also made an appearance on the All-WCHA First Team with Warden while Lorimer and Mike Zuke made the WCHA Second Team.

The following year Warden would be the starting goaltender for the US national team at the Winter Olympics, joined by fellow Michigan Tech alums Steve Jensen and Paul Jensen.

== Standings ==
1974–75 Western Collegiate Hockey Association standings
	Conference							Overall					
	GP	W	L	T	PTS	GF	GA	GP	W	L	T	GF	GA
Minnesota†*	32	24	8	0	48	146	102	42	31	10	1	187	133
Michigan Tech*	32	22	10	0	44	181	108	42	32	10	0	243	136
Colorado College	32	21	11	0	42	165	136	39	23	16	0	196	170
Wisconsin	32	19	11	2	40	138	121	38	24	12	2	174	143
Michigan State	32	19	12	1	39	157	136	40	22	17	1	191	175
Michigan	32	17	15	0	34	158	140	40	22	17	1	192	167
Notre Dame	32	10	19	3	23	115	158	38	13	22	3	141	187
Minnesota-Duluth	32	9	20	3	21	141	166	38	10	24	4	158	192
Denver	32	9	22	1	19	116	175	36	12	23	1	138	190
North Dakota	32	4	26	2	10	98	173	36	6	28	2	115	192
Championship: Michigan Tech, Minnesota † indicates conference regular season champion * indicates conference tournament champion

== Schedule ==
Date	Opponent	Site	Result	Record
Regular Season
October 25	vs. Lake Superior State*	Student Ice Arena • Houghton, Michigan	W 8–4	1–0
October 26	vs. Lake Superior State*	Student Ice Arena • Houghton, Michigan	W 6–2	2–0
November 1	at Minnesota–Duluth	Duluth Arena Auditorium • Duluth, Minnesota	W 7–4	3–0 (1–0)
November 2	at Minnesota–Duluth	Duluth Arena Auditorium • Duluth, Minnesota	W 6–3	4–0 (2–0)
November 8	vs. Michigan State	Student Ice Arena • Houghton, Michigan	L 2–4	4–1 (2–1)
November 9	vs. Michigan State	Student Ice Arena • Houghton, Michigan	L 4–5	4–2 (2–2)
November 15	vs. Colorado College	Student Ice Arena • Houghton, Michigan	W 8–7	5–2 (3–2)
November 16	vs. Colorado College	Student Ice Arena • Houghton, Michigan	L 2–4	5–3 (3–3)
November 22	at Michigan	Yost Ice Arena • Ann Arbor, Michigan	L 5–7	5–4 (3–4)
November 23	at Michigan	Yost Ice Arena • Ann Arbor, Michigan	L 3–4	5–5 (3–5)
November 29	vs. North Dakota	Student Ice Arena • Houghton, Michigan	W 8–2	6–5 (4–5)
November 30	vs. North Dakota	Student Ice Arena • Houghton, Michigan	W 8–3	7–5 (5–5)
December 6	at Denver	DU Arena • Denver, Colorado	W 9–2	8–5 (6–5)
December 7	at Denver	DU Arena • Denver, Colorado	W 4–3	9–5 (7–5)
December 13	at Notre Dame	Athletic & Convocation Center • Notre Dame, Indiana	W 5–3	10–5 (8–5)
December 14	at Notre Dame	Athletic & Convocation Center • Notre Dame, Indiana	W 8–2	11–5 (9–5)
December 20	at Minnesota	Williams Arena • Minneapolis, Minnesota	L 2–4	11–6 (9–6)
December 21	at Minnesota	Williams Arena • Minneapolis, Minnesota	L 3–6	11–7 (9–7)
Great Lakes Invitational
December 27	vs. Yale*	Detroit Olympia • Detroit, Michigan (Great Lakes Invitational)	W 7–3	12–7 (9–7)
December 28	vs. Michigan*	Detroit Olympia • Detroit, Michigan (Great Lakes Invitational)	W 3–2	13–7 (9–7)
January 10	vs. Michigan	Student Ice Arena • Houghton, Michigan	L 4–5	13–8 (9–8)
January 11	vs. Michigan	Student Ice Arena • Houghton, Michigan	W 6–0	14–8 (10–8)
January 17	at vs. North Dakota	Ralph Engelstad Arena • Grand Forks, North Dakota	W 6–4	15–8 (11–8)
January 18	at vs. North Dakota	Ralph Engelstad Arena • Grand Forks, North Dakota	W 6–1	16–8 (12–8)
January 24	vs. Denver	Student Ice Arena • Houghton, Michigan	W 11–5	17–8 (13–8)
January 25	vs. Denver	Student Ice Arena • Houghton, Michigan	W 7–0	18–8 (14–8)
January 31	at Michigan State	Munn Ice Arena • East Lansing, Michigan	W 5–2	19–8 (15–8)
February 1	at Michigan State	Munn Ice Arena • East Lansing, Michigan	W 5–4	20–8 (16–8)
February 7	vs. Minnesota–Duluth	Student Ice Arena • Houghton, Michigan (Winter Carnival)	W 10–3	21–8 (17–8)
February 8	vs. Minnesota–Duluth	Student Ice Arena • Houghton, Michigan (Winter Carnival)	L 4–7	21–9 (17–9)
February 14	vs. Notre Dame	Student Ice Arena • Houghton, Michigan	W 7–3	22–9 (18–9)
February 15	vs. Notre Dame	Student Ice Arena • Houghton, Michigan	W 10–1	23–9 (19–9)
February 21	at Wisconsin	Dane County Coliseum • Madison, Wisconsin	L 0–4	23–10 (19–10)
February 22	at Wisconsin	Dane County Coliseum • Madison, Wisconsin	W 4–2	24–10 (20–10)
February 28	vs. Minnesota	Student Ice Arena • Houghton, Michigan	W 7–0	25–10 (21–10)
March 1	vs. Minnesota	Student Ice Arena • Houghton, Michigan	W 5–4	26–10 (22–10)
WCHA Tournament
March 3	vs. Notre Dame*	Student Ice Arena • Houghton, Michigan (WCHA First Round Game 1)	W 2–0	27–10 (22–10)
March 4	vs. Notre Dame*	Student Ice Arena • Houghton, Michigan (WCHA First Round Game 2)	W 6–3	28–10 (22–10)
March 6	vs. Michigan State*	Student Ice Arena • Houghton, Michigan (WCHA Second Round Game 1)	W 6–4	29–10 (22–10)
March 7	vs. Michigan State*	Student Ice Arena • Houghton, Michigan (WCHA Second Round Game 2)	W 9–4	30–10 (22–10)
NCAA Tournament
March 13	vs. Boston University*	St. Louis Arena • St. Louis, Missouri (National Semifinal)	W 9–5	31–10 (22–10)
March 15	vs. Minnesota*	St. Louis Arena • St. Louis, Missouri (National championship)	W 6–1	32–10 (22–10)
*Non-conference game. ^{#}Rankings from USCHO.com Poll. Source:

== Roster and scoring statistics ==
No.	Name	Year	Position	Hometown	S/P/C	Games	Goals	Assists	Pts	PIM
8	Bob D'Alvise	Senior	C	Etobicoke, ON	(Ontario)	42	37	47	84	4
7	Mike Zuke	Junior	C	Sault Ste. Marie, ON	(Ontario)	42	35	43	78	20
17	Bill Steele	Senior	RW	Edinburgh, SCO	(Scotland)	42	29	30	59	24
10	George Lyle	Junior	LW	Edmonton, AB	(Alberta)	38	37	19	56	76
19	Steve Jensen	Sophomore	LW	Minneapolis, MN	(Minnesota)	41	16	32	48	18
15	Stuart Ostlund	Freshman	C	Vancouver, BC	(British Columbia)	42	12	30	42	8
20	Stu Younger	Sophomore	LW	Calgary, AB	(Alberta)	40	17	20	37	32
5	Bob Lorimer	Senior	D	Toronto, ON	(Ontario)	38	10	21	31	68
11	Dana Decker	Freshman	LW	Minneapolis, MN	(Minnesota)	41	8	13	21	12
12	Peter Roberts	Freshman	C	Warroad, MN	(Minnesota)	41	8	9	17	32
24	Scott Jessee	Junior	RW	Detroit, MI	(Michigan)	40	7	10	17	22
22	Bruce Abbey	Senior	D	Belmont, ON	(Ontario)	36	3	14	17	83
27	Jim Mayer	Junior	RW	Capreol, ON	(Ontario)	26	9	7	16	12
6	Ed Dempsey	Sophomore	D	Kamloops, BC	(British Columbia)	29	3	12	15	34
3	Paul Jensen	Sophomore	D	Minneapolis, MN	(Minnesota)	40	2	12	14	26
4	Jim Murray	Junior	D	Burlington, ON	(Ontario)	41	1	11	12	18
9	Steve Bourchard	Freshman	F	Brooklyn Center, MN	(Minnesota)	33	4	7	11	44
14	Chris Ferguson	Sophomore	F	Thunder Bay, ON	(Ontario)	20	3	8	11	8
25	Jeff Wilcox	Sophomore	D	Portland, OR	(Oregon)	19	1	8	9	24
2	Nels Goddard	Freshman	D	Vancouver, BC	(British Columbia)	21	1	8	9	6
18	Doug Young	Freshman	D	Chatham, ON	(Ontario)	22	0	5	5	18
16	Kurt Helminen	Freshman	F	Laurium, MI	(Michigan)	0	–	–	–	–
30	Tom O'Connell	Freshman	G	Harrisburg, PA	(Pennsylvania)	2	–	–	–	–
31	Bruce Horsch	Freshman	G	Hastings, MN	(Minnesota)	9	–	–	–	–
1	Jim Warden	Senior	G	Detroit, MI	(Michigan)	31	–	–	–	–
Total							243	366	609	589

== Goaltending statistics ==
No.	Name	Games	Minutes	Wins	Losses	Ties	Goals against	Saves	Shut outs	SV %	GAA
1	Jim Warden	31	1865	–	–	–	92	947	4	.911	2.96
31	Bruce Horsch	9	–	7	2	0	–	–	0	.894	3.20
30	Tom O'Connell	1	42	0	1	0	5	21	0	.808	7.14
Total		42	–	32	10	0	136	–	4	–	–

== 1975 championship game ==
=== (W1) Minnesota vs. (W2) Michigan Tech ===
March 15	Minnesota	1 – 6	Michigan Tech	St. Louis Arena

Scoring summary
Period	Team	Goal	Assist(s)	Time	Score
1st	MTU	Bill Steele	Young and D'Alvise	11:36	1–0 MTU
1st	MTU	Mike Zuke – GW	S. Jensen and Decker	18:56	2–0 MTU
2nd	MTU	George Lyle	S. Jensen and Ostlund	25:21	3–0 MTU
2nd	MTU	Scott Jessee	Mayer and Roberts	38:40	4–0 MTU
3rd	MTU	Bob D'Alvise – PP	Wilcox and Steele	41:26	5–0 MTU
3rd	MTU	George Lyle – PP	Ostlund and Abbey	46:56	6–0 MTU
3rd	MIN	Tom Younghans	Phippen and Gauge	49:49	6–1 MTU
Penalty summary
Period	Team	Player	Penalty	Time	PIM
1st	MIN	Buzz Schneider	Interference	1:00	2:00
1st	MTU	George Lyle	High–Sticking	3:37	2:00
1st	MIN	Joe Micheletti	High–Sticking	5:16	2:00
1st	MTU	Jim Mayer	Roughing	12:27	2:00
1st	MIN	Warren Miller	Roughing	12:27	2:00
1st	MTU	Dana Decker	Tripping	15:27	2:00
2nd	MTU	Bruce Abbey	Interference	20:46	2:00
2nd	MTU	George Lyle	Tripping	28:18	2:00
2nd	MIN	Robby Harris	Elbowing	30:53	2:00
3rd	MIN	Joe Micheletti	Interference	40:18	2:00
3rd	MTU	Bob Lorimer	Tripping	43:40	2:00
3rd	MIN	Paul Holmgren	Elbowing	45:55	2:00
3rd	MIN	Warren Miller	High–Sticking	47:10	2:00
3rd	MIN	Russ Anderson	Holding	47:21	2:00
3rd	MTU	Jim Mayer	Hooking	53:32	2:00
3rd	MIN	Mike Polich	Roughng	53:32	2:00
3rd	MTU	Jim Murray	Roughng	53:32	2:00

Shots by period
Team	1	2	3	T
Michigan Tech	9	5	11	25
Minnesota	7	9	7	23

Goaltenders
Team	Name	Saves	Goals against	Time on ice
MTU	Jim Warden	22	1	
MIN	Larry Thayer	19	6	

== Players drafted into the NHL/WHA ==
=== 1975 NHL Amateur Draft ===
= Did not play in the NHL

Round	Pick	Player	NHL team
4	58	Steve Jensen	Minnesota North Stars
4	67	Stu Younger	Pittsburgh Penguins
5	75	Doug Young	California Golden Seals
7	126	Dana Decker	Philadelphia Flyers
8	133	Paul Jensen	Chicago Blackhawks

=== 1975 WHA Amateur Draft ===
= Did not play in the WHA

Round	Pick	Player	WHA Team
4	51	Stu Younger	Edmonton Oilers
6	82	Dana Decker	Phoenix Roadrunners
7	90	Doug Young	Indianapolis Racers
14	175	Paul Jensen	Houston Aeros
