= 1975 NCAA Division I men's ice hockey tournament =

- Teams: 4
- Finals site: St. Louis Arena, St. Louis, Missouri
- Champions: Michigan Tech Huskies (3rd title)
- Runner-up: Minnesota Golden Gophers (5th title game)
- Semifinalists: Boston University Terriers (10th Frozen Four); Harvard Crimson (7th Frozen Four)
- Winning coach: John MacInnes (3rd title)
- MOP: Jim Warden (Michigan Tech)
- Attendance: 10,639

The 1975 NCAA Division I men's ice hockey tournament was the culmination of the 1974–75 NCAA Division I men's ice hockey season, the 28th such tournament in NCAA history. It was held between March 13 and 15, 1975, and concluded with Michigan Tech defeating Minnesota 6–1. All games were played at the St. Louis Arena in St. Louis, Missouri.

This is the first time since 1949 that all four teams in the tournament had played in the previous championship. It has not happened since (as of 2017).

== Qualifying teams ==
Four teams qualified for the tournament, two each from the eastern and western regions. The ECAC tournament champion and the two WCHA tournament co-champions received automatic bids into the tournament. An at-large bid was offered to a second eastern team based upon both their ECAC tournament finish as well as their regular season record.

East							West						
Seed	School	Conference	Record	Berth type	Appearance	Last bid	Seed	School	Conference	Record	Berth type	Appearance	Last bid
1	Boston University	ECAC Hockey	25–4–1	Tournament champion	10th	1974	1	Minnesota	WCHA	30–9–1	Tournament co-champion	6th	1974
2	Harvard	ECAC Hockey	23–4–0	At-Large	7th	1974	2	Michigan Tech	WCHA	30–10–0	Tournament co-champion	8th	1974

== Format ==
The ECAC champion was seeded as the top eastern team while the WCHA co-champion with the better regular season record was given the top western seed. The second eastern seed was slotted to play the top western seed and vice versa. All games were played at the St. Louis Arena. All matches were Single-game eliminations with the semifinal winners advancing to the national championship game and the losers playing in a consolation game.

== Bracket ==
Semifinals; March 13
E1	Boston University	5
W2	Michigan Tech	9
W1	Minnesota	6
E2	Harvard	4

National Championship; March 15
W2	Michigan Tech	6
W1	Minnesota	1
Third Place Game
E1	Boston University	10
E2	Harvard	5

Note: * denotes overtime period(s)

== Results ==
=== Semifinals ===
March 13, 1975; 6:00 pm	(W1) Minnesota	6–4 (1–3, 1–1, 4–0)	(E2) Harvard	St. Louis Arena

Game reference

Larry Thayer
Goalies
Brian Petrovek

(Vannelli, Phippen) Reed Larson – 01:29	1 – 0
	1 – 1	05:32 – Jim Thomas (Thorndike, Hogan)
	1 – 2	07:38 – David Gauthier (Burke, Bell)
	1 – 3	07:54 – David Gauthier (unassisted)
	1 – 4	23:28 – David Bell (Dagdigian, Piatelli)
(unassisted) Pat Phippen – 27:52	2 – 4
(Micheletti) Warren Miller – 44:51	3 – 4
(Reed Larson) Warren Miller – PP – 47:29	4 – 4
(Polich, Schneider) Warren Miller – GW – 49:11	5 – 4
(Holmgren, Harris) Mark Lambert – 54:55	6 – 4

17 min
Penalties
22 min
30
Shots
32

March 13, 1975; 9:00 pm	(E1) Boston University	5–9 (2–2, 1–5, 2–2)	(W2) Michigan Tech	St. Louis Arena; Attendance: 3,801

Game reference

Brian Durocher
Goalies
Jim Warden

(Burlington, Stanfield) Rick Meagher – 04:53	1 – 0
	1 – 1	07:35 – Jeff Wilcox (unassisted)
	1 – 2	09:16 – PP – Stu Younger (D'Alvise, P. Jensen)
(Brown, Robbins) Vic Stanfield – 19:57	2 – 2
	2 – 3	22:10 – Stu Younger (unassisted)
	2 – 4	23:07 – Peter Roberts (Lorimer, Bouchard)
	2 – 5	25:32 – PP – Bob D'Alvise (Steele, Murray)
(Stanfield, Robbins) Peter Brown – PP – 28:08	3 – 5
	3 – 6	35:23 – GW – Bob D'Alvise (unassisted)
	3 – 7	38:40 – PP – Bill Steele (Zuke, D'Alvise)
	3 – 8	40:19 – PP – George Lyle (P. Jensen)
	3 – 9	41:50 – PP – Mike Zuke (Wilcox)
(Stanfield) Peter Brown – PP – 45:32	4 – 9
(Sunderland) Terry Meagher – 48:43	5 – 9

30 min
Penalties
16 min
34
Shots
40

=== Consolation Game ===
March 15, 1975; 6:00 pm	(E1) Boston University	10–5 (3–3, 4–1, 3–1)	(E2) Harvard	St. Louis Arena; Attendance: 5,000

Game reference
Pat Devlin	Goalies	John Aiken
29	Shots	30

=== National Championship ===
March 15, 1975; 9:00 pm	(W1) Minnesota	1–6 (0–2, 0–2, 1–2)	(W2) Michigan Tech	St. Louis Arena; Attendance: 6,838

Referees: Medo Martinello; Jim Duffy

Scoring summary
Period	Team	Goal	Assist(s)	Time	Score
1st	MTU	Bill Steele	Young and D'Alvise	11:36	1–0 MTU
1st	MTU	Mike Zuke – GW	S. Jensen and Decker	18:56	2–0 MTU
2nd	MTU	George Lyle	S. Jensen and Ostlund	25:21	3–0 MTU
2nd	MTU	Scott Jessee	Mayer and Roberts	38:40	4–0 MTU
3rd	MTU	Bob D'Alvise – PP	Wilcox and Steele	41:26	5–0 MTU
3rd	MTU	George Lyle – PP	Ostlund and Abbey	46:56	6–0 MTU
3rd	MIN	Tom Younghans	Phippen and Gauge	49:49	6–1 MTU
Penalty summary
Period	Team	Player	Penalty	Time	PIM
1st	MIN	Buzz Schneider	Interference	1:00	2:00
1st	MTU	George Lyle	High-sticking	3:37	2:00
1st	MIN	Joe Micheletti	High-sticking	5:16	2:00
1st	MTU	Jim Mayer	Roughing	12:27	2:00
1st	MIN	Warren Miller	Roughing	12:27	2:00
1st	MTU	Dana Decker	Tripping	15:27	2:00
2nd	MTU	Bruce Abbey	Interference	20:46	2:00
2nd	MTU	George Lyle	Tripping	28:18	2:00
2nd	MIN	Robby Harris	Elbowing	30:53	2:00
3rd	MIN	Joe Micheletti	Interference	40:18	2:00
3rd	MTU	Bob Lorimer	Tripping	43:40	2:00
3rd	MIN	Paul Holmgren	Elbowing	45:55	2:00
3rd	MIN	Warren Miller	High-sticking	47:10	2:00
3rd	MIN	Russ Anderson	Holding	47:21	2:00
3rd	MTU	Jim Mayer	Hooking	53:32	2:00
3rd	MIN	Mike Polich	Roughng	53:32	2:00
3rd	MTU	Jim Murray	Roughng	53:32	2:00

Shots by period
Team	1	2	3	T
Michigan Tech	9	5	11	25
Minnesota	7	9	7	23

Goaltenders
Team	Name	Saves	Goals against	Time on ice
MTU	Jim Warden	22	1	
MIN	Larry Thayer	19	6	

== All-Tournament Team ==
- G: Jim Warden* (Michigan Tech)
- D: Reed Larson (Minnesota)
- D: Bob Lorimer (Michigan Tech)
- F: Bob D'Alvise (Michigan Tech)
- F: Steve Jensen (Michigan Tech)
- F: Warren Miller (Minnesota)

* Most Outstanding Player(s)
