= Mantenuto =

Mantenuto is a surname. Notable people with the surname include:

- Daniel Mantenuto (born 1997), Canadian-Italian ice hockey player
- Michael Mantenuto (1981–2017), American ice hockey player, actor and soldier

== See also ==
- His Women (Italian: Il mantenuto), a 1961 Italian comedy film
