= George Nagobads =

American physician (1921–2023)

- Born: Visvaldis Georgs Nagobads; November 18, 1921; Riga, Latvia
- Died: March 31, 2023 (aged 101); Edina, Minnesota, US
- Education: University of Tübingen
- Occupation: Physician
- Years active: 1952–1992
- Employer: University of Minnesota
- Known for: United States men's national ice hockey team; Minnesota Golden Gophers men's ice hockey
- Awards: United States Hockey Hall of Fame; Paul Loicq Award

Visvaldis Georgs Nagobads (November 18, 1921 – March 31, 2023) was a Latvian-born American physician. He earned a medical degree from the University of Tübingen in Germany, then immigrated to the United States in 1951. He served 34 years as the team physician for Minnesota Golden Gophers men's ice hockey and was a part of three NCAA Division I championship teams. He also served as the physician for the US men's national team at five Winter Olympics and was on the Miracle on Ice team which won the gold medal at the 1980 Winter Olympics.

His other work included chief medical officer for USA Hockey, the medical committee for the International Ice Hockey Federation, and team physician for the Minnesota Fighting Saints and Minnesota North Stars. His career was recognized with the Paul Loicq Award for contributions to international hockey, induction into the Golden Gophers Hockey Hall of Fame, and induction into the United States Hockey Hall of Fame as an individual and as a member of the US men's national team.

== Early life and education ==
Visvaldis Georgs Nagobads was born on November 18, 1921, in Riga, Latvia. He played ice hockey and bandy as a youth in Latvia. His father was the director of Riga City Gymnasium No. 2, where he played volleyball and basketball. While in high school, he chose to become a doctor and follow in his uncle's footsteps. Nagobads had completed two courses at the University of Latvia Faculty of Medicine, when he was called for Latvian National Armed Forces duty to work in a hospital on the front line. His family fled to Germany due to the Soviet re-occupation of Latvia in 1944.

After studying at the University of Giessen, Nagobads earned his medical degree from the University of Tübingen. In 1947, he was one of the founders of the Latvian Association of Physicians and Dentists. After World War II, he worked on a mobile X-ray unit for an international refugee organization in France, which assisted in diagnosis of tuberculosis. He had lunch one day with a Christian minister who recommended moving to the United States where employment in the medical field was easier to obtain. Nagobads and his wife moved to Minnesota in June 1951. He worked as a hospital orderly while he learned English, then completed his surgical residency, then began working for student health services at the University of Minnesota in 1956.

== Minnesota ice hockey career ==
Minnesota Golden Gophers, 1958–59 season

Nagobads was recommended for the university's ice hockey programs by Ruth Boynton, the director of the student health service. He served as the team physician for Minnesota Golden Gophers men's ice hockey for 34 years from 1958 to 1992, and was a part of three NCAA Division I championship teams. In an interview in 2008, Nagobads recalled that he enjoyed caring about the athletes and specialized in knee and shoulder injuries. He worked with several coaches for the Golden Gophers, including Herb Brooks, Glen Sonmor, Brad Buetow, and Doug Woog. Nagobads considered Brooks to be family and stated, "I really appreciated the way Herbie always treated the players, and for me, he was just like my son".

Nagobads was also the team physician for the Minnesota Fighting Saints in the World Hockey Association from 1973 to 1976, and the Minnesota North Stars in the National Hockey League from 1984 to 1992.

== International ice hockey career ==
Nagobads served as the physician for the US men's national team at five Winter Olympics from 1968 to 1988, and at 15 other international tournaments from 1967 to 1990. He was also the physician for the US men's junior national team at five World Junior championships, and the US women's national team when established in 1990. He was the chief medical officer for USA Hockey from 1984 to 1992, and sat on the safety and protective equipment committee since 1984. He also served on the International Ice Hockey Federation (IIHF) Medical Committee from 1990 to 2010, and assisted with programs to eliminate doping in sport.

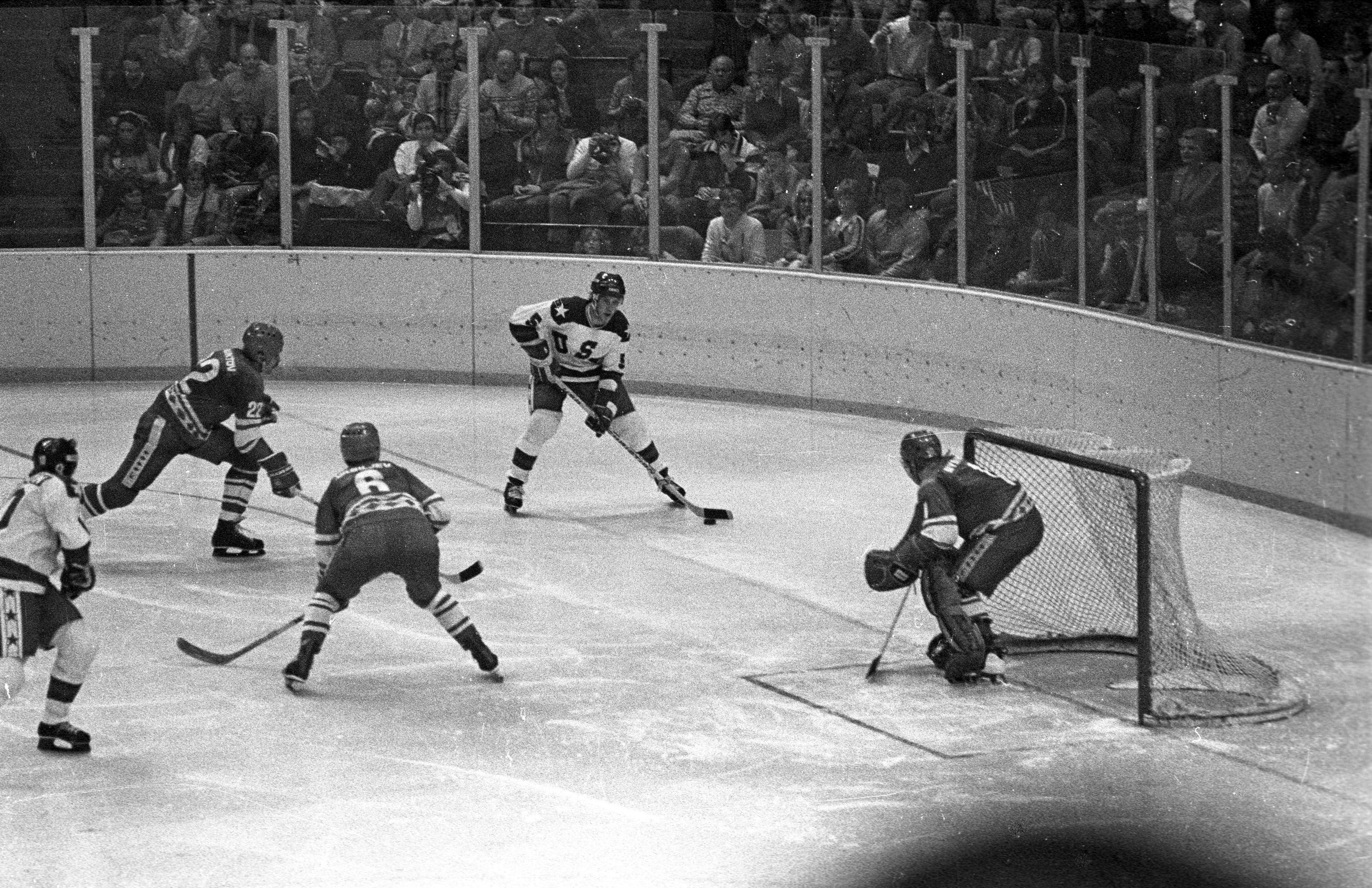
US versus Soviet Union at the 1980 Winter Olympics

In advance of the ice hockey at the 1980 Winter Olympics, Nagobads suggested to Herb Brooks that Mike Eruzione be named the US men's national team captain due to his leadership skills. Nagobads also welcomed Jim Craig into his house, a goaltender who wanted to live with a family during national team training. The US men's national team won the Olympic gold medal in 1980, which included a 4–3 victory versus the Soviet Union national team, known as the Miracle on Ice. Brooks wanted his team to play on lines lasting 40 seconds or less to stay energized by the third period. Nagobads stood beside Brooks with a stopwatch tracking the ice time for the players, and later joked that he never saw the game since he was focused on the watch. He skipped the post-game celebration to complete injury reports for the players, when he was approached by players on the Soviet team who asked for translation assistance to buy Moon Boots for their wives.

Nagobads published his memoirs of the US men's national team in his 2004 book, Gold, Bronze, & Silver: A Doctor's Devotion to American Hockey. In the 2004 film Miracle, actor Kenneth Welsh portrayed Nagobads in a story about the 1980 Winter Olympics team. In a 2010 interview, Nagobads stated that his fondest memories of hockey included the victory over the Soviet Union in 1980, and the subsequent gold medal victory in the final game versus the Finland national team.

== Honors and legacy ==
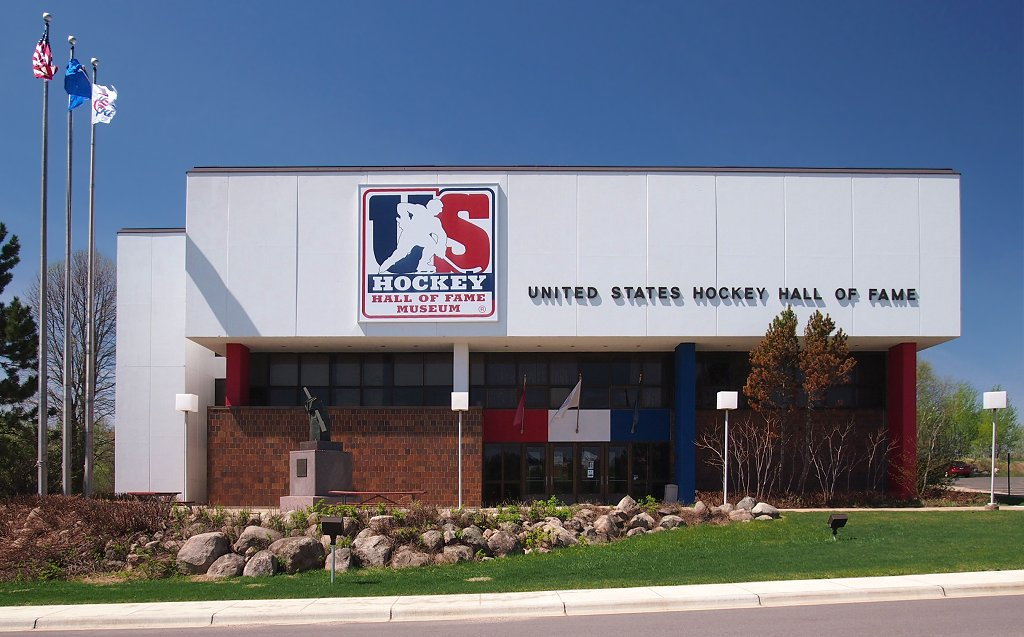
United States Hockey Hall of Fame building in Eveleth, Minnesota

Nagobads was known as the "hockey doc" during his 34-year tenure with the Minnesota Golden Gophers men's ice hockey team. He was made the namesake of the Dr. V. George Nagobads Unsung Hero Award in 1978, at the recommendation of Herb Brooks for annual recognition of a player on the team.

In 2003, the IIHF recognized Nagobads for his career of contributions to international ice hockey with the Paul Loicq Award. In the same year, he was inducted into the United States Hockey Hall of Fame as a member of the US men's national team at the 1980 Winter Olympics. USA Hockey honored him with both the Distinguished Achievement Award and the Excellence in Safety Award in 2005. In 2010, he was inducted into the United States Hockey Hall of Fame as an individual in the builder category.

Nagobads was inducted into the Golden Gophers Hockey Hall of Fame in 2010. In a men's hockey pre-game ceremony on November 20, 2021, the Golden Gophers celebrated the 100th birthday of Nagobads, and recognized the 1974, 1976, and 1979 championships won by the Golden Gophers. He was given a 100th birthday party luncheon, attended by former players of the Gophers, and others well-known in Minnesota hockey.

In January 2022, Nagobads as named the recipient of the 2021–22 State of Hockey Legacy Award, in recognition of long-term contributions to hockey in Minnesota, as given by the Minnesota Wild in partnership with Minnesota Hockey and Bally Sports North.

== Personal life and death ==
Nagobads was encouraged by his father to learn a foreign language, and became fluent in French and German by kindergarten age. As an adult he spoke five languages: Latvian, French, German, Russian and English. He had two daughters, and resided in Edina, Minnesota. He was married to Velta Maria Nagobads until her death on September 12, 2005.

In April 2015, he was the victim of a mugging while laying flowers and visiting his wife's grave. He escaped by throwing his wallet away, then drove himself to the hospital where he received 18 stitches on wounds to his head. In November 2015, Nagobads became an ambassador for the Kids First Fund and contributed to fostering safe environments for abused children worldwide.

Nagobads died on March 31, 2023, at age 101, in Edina, Minnesota, and was interred with his wife in Crystal Lake Cemetery in Minneapolis. He was remembered by former Gopher player and US men's national junior team coach Murray Williamson who wrote, "A gentleman beyond reproach who touched the lives of literally thousands of young hockey players at the youth, collegiate, international and Olympic levels over the past 65 years".
