= Stuart Ostlund =

Canadian ice hockey player

- Born: March 27, 1956 (age 69); Vancouver, British Columbia, Canada
- Height: 5 ft 11 in (180 cm)
- Weight: 180 lb (82 kg; 12 st 12 lb)
- Position: Center
- Shot: Right
- Played for: Michigan Tech; Fort Wayne Komets; Dallas Black Hawks; SaiPa
- NHL draft: 122nd overall, 1976; Vancouver Canucks
- WHA draft: 85th overall, 1976; Cincinnati Stingers
- Playing career: 1978–1981

Stuart Ostlund is a Canadian former ice hockey player. He won a national championship with Michigan Tech in the United States before embarking on a brief professional career.

== Career ==
Ostlund debuted for Michigan Tech in 1974 and joined the team just in time for its 3rd championship run. Ostlund averages a point per game during his freshman season and assisted on two goals in the championship game. His sophomore season saw Ostlund take on a major role with the team and double his point total. He finished in the top 10 in the national and combined with Mike Zuke and George Lyle to form one of the most devastating offensive units in college hockey. Unfortunately, the team came one win shy of repeating their championship, losing to Minnesota in the final. That summer, Ostlund was selected in both the NHL and WHA drafts. After Zuke and Lyle left MTU, Ostlund's point totals dropped back to about a point per game and he saw less success with Michigan Tech but still finished out his four years in Houghton.

Ostlund turned pro in 1978 and had a tremendous first season. He produced at well over a point per game pace with the Fort Wayne Komets and helping the club reach the league semifinals. Despite the success, he was demoted to the CHL the following year and was able to post only modest numbers with the Dallas Black Hawks. After starting the year with Dallas, he left the team and travelled to Finland, ending the year with SaiPa and then retiring as a player.

== Career statistics ==
=== Regular season and playoffs ===
			Regular Season					Playoffs
Season	Team	League	GP	G	A	Pts	PIM	GP	G	A	Pts	PIM
1974–75	Michigan Tech	WCHA	42	12	30	42	8	—	—	—	—	—
1975–76	Michigan Tech	WCHA	43	34	50	84	18	—	—	—	—	—
1976–77	Michigan Tech	WCHA	35	18	23	41	17	—	—	—	—	—
1977–78	Michigan Tech	WCHA	40	16	30	46	18	—	—	—	—	—
1978–79	Dallas Black Hawks	CHL	6	1	2	3	0	—	—	—	—	—
1978–79	Fort Wayne Komets	IHL	69	34	49	83	24	13	2	12	14	4
1979–80	Dallas Black Hawks	CHL	50	11	16	27	4	—	—	—	—	—
1980–81	Dallas Black Hawks	CHL	8	0	2	2	2	—	—	—	—	—
1980–81	SaiPa Lappeenranta	SM-liiga	20	3	5	8	—	—	—	—	—	—
NCAA Totals			160	80	133	213	61	—	—	—	—	—
