= Miracle (2004 film) =

American sports film by Gavin O'Connor

- Theatrical release poster
- Directed by: Gavin O'Connor
- Written by: Eric Guggenheim
- Produced by: Mark Ciardi; Gordon Gray; Ross Greenburg; Justis Greene; Jon Mone; Greg O'Connor
- Starring: Kurt Russell; Patricia Clarkson; Noah Emmerich
- Cinematography: Dan Stoloff
- Edited by: John Gilroy
- Music by: Mark Isham
- Production companies: Walt Disney Pictures; Mayhem Pictures
- Distributed by: Buena Vista Pictures Distribution
- Release date: February 6, 2004
- Running time: 136 minutes
- Country: United States
- Language: English
- Budget: $28 million
- Box office: $64.5 million

Miracle is a 2004 American sports film directed by Gavin O'Connor and written by Eric Guggenheim. It is about the U.S. men's ice hockey team, whose victory in the 1980 Winter Olympics over the heavily favored seasoned Soviet team was dubbed the "Miracle on Ice". Kurt Russell stars as head coach Herb Brooks with Patricia Clarkson and Noah Emmerich in supporting roles.

Miracle was released by Buena Vista Pictures Distribution on February 6, 2004, and grossed $64.5 million on a $28 million budget. It received positive reviews, with Russell's performance garnering the most praise from critics.

== Plot ==
Herb Brooks, head ice hockey coach at the University of Minnesota, interviews with the United States Olympic Committee (USOC) for the national team coach's job, discussing his philosophy on how to beat the dominant Soviet team who have won the gold medal in the previous four Olympics, calling for changes to the practice schedule and strategy. The USOC is skeptical, but gives Brooks the job.

Brooks meets assistant coach Craig Patrick at the tryouts in Colorado Springs. Brooks selects a preliminary roster of 26, indifferent to the preferences of senior USOC hockey officials. USOC executive director Walter Bush believes Brooks has their best interests at heart, and reluctantly agrees to take the heat from the committee.

During the initial practice, tempers flare as forward Rob McClanahan and defenseman Jack O'Callahan get into a fight based on college rivalry. After the fight, Brooks tells all the players that they are to let go of old rivalries and start becoming a team. He has each player tell their name, hometown and which team they play for. As practices continue, Brooks uses unorthodox methods to reduce the roster to 20 players. The players themselves worry about being cut at any time, knowing that Brooks himself was the last player cut from the US squad that won the 1960 Olympic gold medal, so he will do anything to win.

During an exhibition game against Norway in Oslo that ends in a 3–3 tie, Brooks notices the players are not playing up to their potential. After the game, he orders them back on the ice for a bag skate – a relentless skate from one end of the ice to the other, continuing the drill even after the rink manager cuts the power, until forward and team captain Mike Eruzione re-introduces himself, but this time says that he plays for the United States. Pleased, Brooks finally allows the team to go home.

With their roster finalized, the Americans play the Soviets in an exhibition game at Madison Square Garden. The Soviets manhandle the young Americans, winning by a score of 10–3. During the game, O'Callahan suffers a knee injury that could keep him out of the entire Olympics and starting goaltender Jim Craig is told he may be benched in favor of backup Steve Janaszak. Brooks tells him that he hasn't been giving his very best, but decides to keep Craig as the starter for the Olympics.

As the 1980 Winter Olympics begin, the Americans trail Sweden 2–1 in the first game. Brooks fires up the team during the first intermission by throwing a table and accuses McClanahan, who suffered a thigh bruise, of quitting. McClanahan plays injured, which inspires the team. Bill Baker scores a goal with only 27 seconds remaining in the third period for a dramatic 2–2 tie. They next earn a 7–3 win over heavily favored Czechoslovakia. As the Olympics continue, the team defeats minor opponents Norway, Romania, and West Germany to earn a spot in the medal round.

In the medal round, the Americans are overwhelming underdogs to the Soviets, who lost only a single Olympic game since 1964 and whose players are professionals, whereas the American players are amateurs. Vladimir Krutov of the Soviets scores the first goal before O'Callahan, having healed enough from his injury, enters the game for the first time. He heavily checks Krutov on a play that leads to a goal by Buzz Schneider. Sergei Makarov scores for the Soviets to give them the lead again. Soviet goalie Vladislav Tretiak stops a long shot by Dave Christian, but Mark Johnson gets the rebound and ties the game to end the period.

During the first intermission, Soviet coach Viktor Tikhonov replaces Tretiak with backup Vladimir Myshkin. Early in the second period, John Harrington is penalized for holding and Alexander Maltsev of the Soviets scores a power play goal to go up 3–2. Early in the third period, Vladimir Krutov is penalized for high-sticking, and Johnson scores a power play goal just as the penalty is about to expire. With 10 minutes left, Eruzione puts them ahead 4–3. The Americans hold off the Soviets to win the game, completing one of the biggest upsets in sports history. Two days later, the team would go on to defeat Finland 4–2 to win the gold medal, and Mark Johnson is named tournament MVP as the team's leading scorer.

Before the credits roll, the film pays tribute to Herb Brooks, who was killed in a single-car accident a year before the film was released.

== Cast ==
U.S. Olympic Hockey Team Coaching Staff

- Kurt Russell as Herb Brooks, Head Coach
- Noah Emmerich as Craig Patrick, Assistant General Manager and Assistant Coach
- Sean McCann as Walter Bush, General Manager
- Kenneth Welsh as George "Doc" Nagobads, Team Physician

U.S. Olympic Hockey Team Players

- Eddie Cahill as Jim Craig, Goaltender. Plays in every minute of every game.
- Sam Skoryna as Steve Janaszak, Backup Goaltender. Never played in the Olympics.
- Patrick O'Brien Demsey as Mike Eruzione, Forward and Captain. Scores the game-winning goal against the Soviets.
- Eric Peter-Kaiser as Mark Johnson, Forward and team MVP.
- Billy Schneider as Buzz Schneider, Forward and part of the Conehead line. (In real life, Billy is Buzz's son.)
- Nate Miller as John Harrington, Forward and part of the Conehead line.
- Chris Koch as Mark Pavelich, Forward and part of the Conehead line.
- Nathan West as Rob McClanahan, Forward
- Bobby Hanson as Dave Silk, Forward
- Kris Wilson as Phil Verchota, Forward
- Scott Johnson as Steve Christoff, Forward
- Trevor Alto as Neal Broten, Forward
- Robbie MacGregor as Eric Strobel, Forward
- Joe Hemsworth as Mark Wells, Forward
- Stephen Kovalcik as Dave Christian, Forward and Defenseman
- Joseph Cure as Mike Ramsey, Defenseman and youngest player.
- Michael Mantenuto as Jack O'Callahan, Defenseman
- Pete Duffy as Bob Suter, Defenseman
- Nick Postle as Bill Baker, Defenseman
- Casey Burnette as Ken Morrow, Defenseman
- Kenneth Mitchell as Ralph Cox, Forward and last player cut from the team.
- Adam Knight as Tim Harrer, Forward brought in for a late tryout and eventually cut.

Miscellaneous

- Patricia Clarkson as Patti Brooks, Herb's wife
- Malcolm Stewart as Donald Craig, Jim Craig's father
- Zinaid Memišević as Viktor Tikhonov, Head Coach of the Soviet Olympic Hockey Team
- Don S. Davis as Bob Fleming, chair of the USOC
- Bill Mondy as Lou Nanne, member of the USOC
- Al Michaels as Himself, Sportscaster who provided play–by–play for the Olympic hockey tournament (voice over and archive footage only)
- Ken Dryden as Himself, Former NHL goaltender who provided color commentary for the Olympic hockey tournament (voice over and archive footage only)

== Production ==
Gavin O'Connor directed, and Mark Ciardi produced the movie. Both are drawn to inspirational stories, and they decided to take on the "Greatest Sports Moment of the 20th Century". They chose to focus on the determination and focus of coach Herb Brooks. O'Connor knew from the beginning that he wanted to cast Kurt Russell as Herb Brooks because he needed someone with an athletic background and a fiery passion for sports (however, Dan Brooks, Herb's son, stated years later that the first name in mind for the role was Tom Hanks). The casting of the team consisted of real hockey players to give the film a raw and accurate feel. O'Connor figured it would be easier to teach hockey players to act than to teach actors to play hockey. On-ice tryouts were held in New York, Boston, Minneapolis, Los Angeles, Toronto, and Vancouver. Another tryout was held in Vancouver for the Soviet and European teams.

There are a total of 133 different hockey plays in the film. To accomplish this, the directors turned to ReelSports Solutions, who had helped with the producers on a previous movie, The Rookie. The ReelSports team referred to coach Herb Brooks for information on practices, plays, equipment, and uniform styles. Each fight and stunt scene was choreographed to ensure the actors' safety. Players went through a six-week training camp to relearn the game in older equipment.

All the locations of the real-life hockey games are replicated by hockey arenas in British Columbia. The team tryouts, set in Colorado Springs, were filmed at the Queen's Park Arena in New Westminster. The team practices were filmed at the M.S.A. Arena in Abbotsford. The exhibition game in which the USA team lost to the USSR team at Madison Square Garden was filmed at the Pacific Coliseum, former home of the Vancouver Canucks. The Exhibition against Norway, the subsequent bag skate, and all Olympic game scenes were filmed at the PNE Agrodome.

Al Michaels and Ken Dryden re-recorded most of their television commentary for the film. However, the last 30 seconds of the USA-Soviet game, including Michaels' "Do you believe in miracles?", used the original audio, as Michaels didn't feel he could re-create the call effectively.

Coach Brooks died in a car accident half a year before the movie was released. At the end, before the credits, it states, "This film is dedicated to the memory of Herb Brooks, who died shortly following principal photography. He never saw it. He lived it."

== Release ==
Miracle was released with a rating of PG.

=== Home media ===
Miracle was released on DVD and VHS on May 18, 2004. The DVD version of the film is THX certified, being a two-disc release. The Blu-Ray was released on June 16, 2009.

== Reception ==
=== Box office ===
Miracle grossed $19.4 million on its opening weekend on 2,605 screens, ranking second behind Barbershop 2: Back in Business. It closed with a worldwide gross of $64.4 million.

=== Critical response ===
On Rotten Tomatoes, Miracle has an approval rating of 80% based on 163 reviews with an average rating of 7/10. The site's critical consensus reads: "Kurt Russell's performance guides this cliche-ridden tale into the realm of inspirational, nostalgic goodness." On Metacritic the film has a weighted average score of 68 out of 100, based on 36 critics, indicating "generally favorable reviews". Audiences polled by CinemaScore gave the film an average grade of "A" on an A+ to F scale.

Elvis Mitchell of The New York Times stated that the movie "does a yeoman's job of recycling the day-old dough that passes for its story." Kenneth Turan of the Los Angeles Times referred to the movie as "a classically well-made studio entertainment that, like The Rookie of a few years back, has the knack of being moving without shamelessly overdoing a sure thing." Bill Muller of The Arizona Republic gave it a 2.5 out of a 5 scoring, saying, "Even for a Disney sports movie, this is a treacly affair, complete with an Armageddon-style hero shot that just screams manipulation." Deborah Hornblow of Hartford Courant earned a rating of 3 out of 5, stating that "the result is something like the Seabiscuit of sports team films or a Remember the Titans of the Cold War." O'Callahan said in an interview that while the fight between him and McClanahan was fictional, the film accurately portrayed the "pretty intense" rivalry between Boston Terriers and Minnesota Gophers players, and was overall "pretty darn close" to actual events.

As of May 2023, Miracle was rated the number six sports movie of all time with a rating of 9.06 out of 10 at Sports In Movies, after maintaining the number one spot for several years.

=== Accolades ===
Miracle won the Best Sports Movie ESPY Award for 2004.

American Film Institute recognition

- AFI's 100 Years...100 Cheers - Nominated
- AFI's 10 Top 10 - Nominated

=== Legacy ===
In February 2026, after the United States men's and women’s national ice hockey teams won gold medals at the 2026 Winter Olympics, the film saw a 21x increase in viewership on Disney+.

== See also ==
- List of films about ice hockey
- List of sports films
- Miracle on Ice (1981 film)
