= 1975 WCHA men's ice hockey tournament =

1975 WCHA Men's ice hockey tournament
- Dates: March 3–9, 1975
- Teams: 8
- Finals site: Student Ice Arena; Houghton, Michigan; Williams Arena; Minneapolis, Minnesota
- Champions: Michigan Tech† (7th title); Minnesota‡ (4th title)
- Winning coach: John MacInnes (7th title); Herb Brooks (2nd title)
- WCHA Men's Ice Hockey Tournaments

The 1975 WCHA Men's Ice Hockey Tournament was the 16th conference playoff in league history. The tournament was played between March 3 and March 9, 1975. All games were played at home team campus sites, including each of the two regional final series. By winning the regional tournaments, both Michigan Tech and Minnesota were invited to participate in the 1975 NCAA Division I Men's Ice Hockey Tournament.

Though not official designations, Michigan Tech is considered as the East Regional Champion† and Minnesota as the West Regional Champion‡.

== Format ==
The top eight teams in the WCHA, according to their final conference standings, were eligible for the tournament and were seeded No. 1 through No. 8. In the first round the first and eighth seeds, the second and seventh seeds, the third and sixth seeds and the fourth and fifth seeds were matched in two-game series where the school that scored the higher number of goals was declared the winner. After the first round the remaining teams were reseeded No. 1 through No. 4 according to their final conference standings and advanced to the second round. In the second round the first and fourth seeds and the second and third seeds competed in an additional two-game, total goal series with the winners of each being declared as co-conference champions.

=== Conference standings ===
Note: GP = Games played; W = Wins; L = Losses; T = Ties; PTS = Points; GF = Goals For; GA = Goals Against

1974–75 Western Collegiate Hockey Association standings
	Conference							Overall					
	GP	W	L	T	PTS	GF	GA	GP	W	L	T	GF	GA
Minnesota†*	32	24	8	0	48	146	102	42	31	10	1	187	133
Michigan Tech*	32	22	10	0	44	181	108	42	32	10	0	243	136
Colorado College	32	21	11	0	42	165	136	39	23	16	0	196	170
Wisconsin	32	19	11	2	40	138	121	38	24	12	2	174	143
Michigan State	32	19	12	1	39	157	136	40	22	17	1	191	175
Michigan	32	17	15	0	34	158	140	40	22	17	1	192	167
Notre Dame	32	10	19	3	23	115	158	38	13	22	3	141	187
Minnesota-Duluth	32	9	20	3	21	141	166	38	10	24	4	158	192
Denver	32	9	22	1	19	116	175	36	12	23	1	138	190
North Dakota	32	4	26	2	10	98	173	36	6	28	2	115	192
Championship: Michigan Tech, Minnesota † indicates conference regular season champion * indicates conference tournament champion

== Bracket ==
Teams are reseeded after the first round

First Round; March 3–5
1	Minnesota	6	4
8	Minnesota-Duluth	0	2
2	Michigan Tech	2	6
7	Notre Dame	0	3
3	Colorado College	3	8
6	Michigan	4	9
4	Wisconsin	5	4
5	Michigan State	4	7

Second Round; March 6–9
1	Minnesota	3	5
6	Michigan	3	2
2	Michigan Tech	6	9
5	Michigan State	4	4

Note: * denotes overtime period(s)

=== First round ===
==== (1) Minnesota vs. (8) Minnesota-Duluth ====
March 4	Minnesota	6 – 0	Minnesota-Duluth	Williams Arena

March 5	Minnesota	4 – 2	Minnesota-Duluth	Williams Arena

Minnesota won series 10–2

==== (2) Michigan Tech vs. (7) Notre Dame ====
March 3	Michigan Tech	2 – 0	Notre Dame	Student Ice Arena

March 4	Michigan Tech	6 – 3	Notre Dame	Student Ice Arena

Michigan Tech won series 8–3

==== (3) Colorado College vs. (6) Michigan ====
March 4	Colorado College	3 – 4	Michigan	Broadmoor World Arena

March 5	Colorado College	8 – 9	Michigan	Broadmoor World Arena

Michigan won series 13–11

==== (4) Wisconsin vs. (5) Michigan State ====
March 4	Wisconsin	5 – 4	Michigan State	Dane County Coliseum

March 5	Wisconsin	4 – 7	Michigan State	Dane County Coliseum

Michigan State won series 11–9

=== Second round ===
==== (1) Minnesota vs. (6) Michigan ====
March 8	Minnesota	3 – 3	Michigan	Williams Arena

March 9	Minnesota	5 – 2	Michigan	Williams Arena

Minnesota won series 8–5

==== (2) Michigan Tech vs. (5) Michigan State ====
March 6	Michigan Tech	6 – 4	Michigan State	Student Ice Arena

March 7	Michigan Tech	9 – 4	Michigan State	Student Ice Arena

Michigan Tech won series 15–8

== Tournament awards ==
None

== See also ==
- Western Collegiate Hockey Association men's champions
