= Mike Eruzione =

American ice hockey player (born 1954)

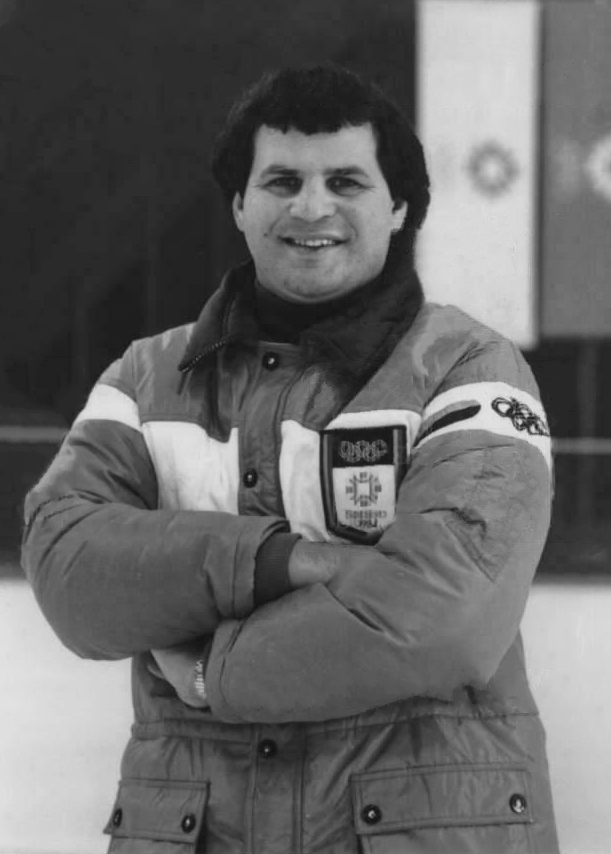
- Eruzione in 1984
- Born: October 25, 1954 (age 71) Winthrop, Massachusetts, U.S.
- Height: 5 ft 10 in (178 cm)
- Weight: 180 lb (82 kg; 12 st 12 lb)
- Position: Left wing
- Shot: Left
- Played for: IHL; Toledo Goaldiggers; AHL; Philadelphia Firebirds
- National team: United States
- NHL draft: Undrafted
- WHA draft: 28th overall, 1974; New England Whalers
- Playing career: 1977–1980
Medal record
Men's ice hockey
Representing the United States
Olympic Games
Gold medal – first place	1980 Lake Placid	Team competition

Michael Anthony "Rizzo" Eruzione (/ɪˌruːziˈoʊni/, Italian pronunciation: [erutˈtsjoːne], born October 25, 1954) is an Italian-American former ice hockey player. He was the captain of the 1980 Winter Olympics United States national team that defeated the Soviet Union in the famous "Miracle on Ice" game, in which he scored the game-winning goal. He is the author, with Neal E. Boudette, of the national bestseller, The Making of a Miracle: The Untold Story of the Captain of The Gold Medal-Winning 1980 U.S. Olympic Hockey Team, published by HarperCollins.

== Biography ==
=== Early life and playing career ===
Eruzione was born on October 25, 1954, to an Italian-American family in Winthrop, Massachusetts. His father was a bartender and worked in a sewage plant. Eruzione learned to play hockey for Youth Hockey of Winthrop as part of the GBYHL (Greater Boston Youth Hockey League). He graduated from Winthrop High School in 1972, where he was captain of the varsity hockey team during his senior year. He then spent a year at Berwick Academy to fine-tune his hockey skills in a New England Prep environment. After leaving Berwick, Eruzione attended Boston University. He had initially opted for another school, but he switched to Boston after his coach forgot his name. While at Boston, he averaged over twenty goals a season for four years. BU coach Jack Parker called Eruzione "Pete Rose on skates".

Eruzione also played for Team USA at the 1975 and 1976 Ice Hockey World Championship tournaments. He then spent two seasons with the Toledo Goaldiggers of the International Hockey League, being named the Rookie of the Year in 1978 and was one of the leaders in the team's Turner Cup championship in that year. Prior to the 1979–80 season, Eruzione, who played left wing, rejoined the U.S. team and was later named Captain of the 1980 Olympic hockey squad, scoring the winning goal against the Soviets and helping the Americans win the gold medal against Finland. Eruzione's winning goal against the Soviet Union was chosen by Sports Illustrated in 1999 as the greatest American sports moment of the twentieth century. In March 2008, it was voted the greatest highlight of all time by ESPN viewers. In an HBO documentary about the 1980 Olympic hockey team, Eruzione said of his winning goal against the Soviet team, "My friends always like to joke with me [about that goal], 'Three more inches to the left, you'd be painting bridges.'"

Due to Eruzione's having played under contract for the Goaldiggers prior to the 1980 Olympics, his amateur status was later brought under question by NHL Players' Association director Alan Eagleson. Eruzione rebutted the charges, saying "He's trying to take something away from me that we so richly deserved. He can't take away the memory. Is he going to try to convince everybody in the United States we lost?"

=== Post-playing career ===
Eruzione was one of five players on the US Olympic team not drafted by an NHL team. Initially, he voiced his interest in playing professionally, mentioning the "New England Whalers" (by that time, renamed as the Hartford Whalers) as a possibility. He retired from competition after the Olympics, despite contract offers from the New York Rangers, stating that he had reached the pinnacle of achievement already. He was a technical consultant for the 1981 film Miracle on Ice, and said "we all know the movie will never be able to equal what happened." Eruzione then became a television broadcaster, grabbing the microphone at Rangers and New Jersey Devils games and for the NHL on USA and NHL on Fox, and going on to comment at five Olympic Games, working for both ABC and CBS. Eruzione said that he did not regret deciding not to play professional hockey, saying "after being a commentator and covering the NHL for a few years, I have no doubt I could play."

Eruzione returned to be the assistant coach for the hockey team for three seasons at his alma mater Boston University. He is a member of several halls of fame. He is a part-owner of the USHL Omaha Lancers, and a motivational speaker. He also helps the Winthrop High School ice hockey team during the winter. In 2002, Eruzione reunited with his 1980 Olympic teammates to light the Olympic cauldron for the 2002 Winter Olympics in Salt Lake City, Utah. On January 19, 2007, Eruzione appeared on the new version of the game show I've Got a Secret. His secret was that he was the captain of the 1980 U.S. Men's Olympic hockey team, but he failed to stump the panel, as his secret was guessed by Billy Bean. In 2012, the Lawrence Larsen Hockey Rink in Eruzione's hometown of Winthrop, Massachusetts was renamed the Larsen Hockey Rink at the Mike Eruzione Center.

=== The Making Of A Miracle ===
On January 28, 2020, Eruzione's book, The Making of a Miracle, was released by Harper, an imprint of HarperCollins Publishers. After its first week of sales, the book was No. 6 on the Wall Street Journal list of best-selling books, and No. 4 on the bestseller list of Publishers Weekly. Like Eruzione, the book's co-author, Neal Boudette, is a graduate of Boston University.

The book gives a detailed, inside account of U.S. Olympic hockey team's path to the gold medal, including the upset of the Soviet Union in the "Miracle On Ice" game, as well as a portrait of Eruzione's close-knit family and the experiences in college and minor league hockey that led him to try out for the Olympic team in 1979. Eruzione has said he wanted to write the book so that his grandchildren would know there was more to his life than scoring one goal in Lake Placid.

== In popular culture ==
In the 1981 made-for-TV movie about the 1980 U.S. Hockey team called Miracle on Ice, Eruzione is portrayed by actor Andrew Stevens. In the 2004 Disney film entitled Miracle, he is portrayed by actor Patrick O'Brien Demsey. Demsey had played hockey at Fitchburg State College, but he gave it up because of injuries and a desire to pursue an acting career. He saw the call for auditions the day before the auditions closed and won the part just days after his 24th birthday. To prepare for the role, he trained with the team Mike Eruzione coached at the time.

In the American Dad! episode "The Return of the Bling," Roger reveals that he was part of the 1980 U.S. hockey team, under his persona "Chex LeMeneux." Stan does not believe him until Roger takes him to a team reunion at La Quinta Inns and Suites and Stan gets to see his team heroes Jim Craig, Mark Johnson and Eruzione. Eruzione provided his own voice for the episode. In season four, episode 12 of the animated television show Archer, the main character, Sterling Archer responds to his mother's exclamation, "So then we will beat the Russians!" with the retort, "Give it up folks: Mike Eruzione!" Eruzione was the presenter in the 1981 pilot of Starcade, a game show featuring video games.

=== Politics ===
Eruzione has supported both Democrats and Republicans, voting for Barack Obama in 2008 and Donald Trump in 2016. In 2012, Eruzione appeared at the Republican National Convention, and he gave a speech in support of nominee Mitt Romney.

Along with thirteen teammates from the 1980 Lake Placid games, Eruzione received backlash when he appeared at a campaign rally for President Trump in Las Vegas in 2020. Several of the former players, including Eruzione himself, sported red Keep America Great hats. Eruzione said he was saddened by the controversy, stating "I shake my head at it, that's all I can say." He later said he regretted the appearance, noting that the team had only been invited to a private picture event and had not expected to appear onstage. On wearing the hat, he said, "I just put it on. I wasn’t thinking. Maybe this shows I’m naive, shows I’m stupid. I don’t know. I don’t follow politics. I know [Trump] has had some issues and said a lot of things people don’t like.”

== Awards and achievements ==
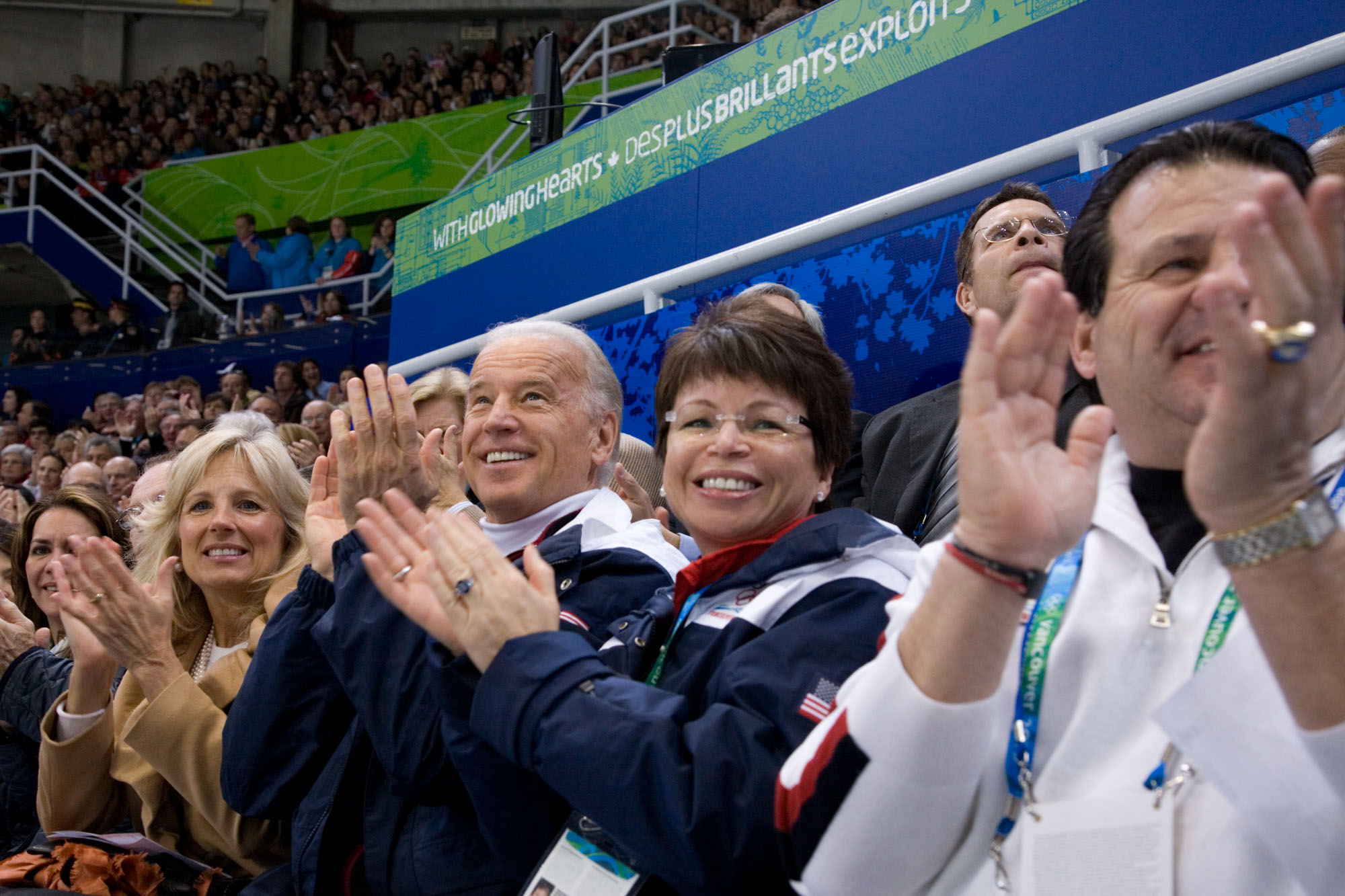
Eruzione (right) at the 2010 Winter Olympics with Joe and Jill Biden

Award	Year
All-ECAC Hockey First Team	1974–75; 1975–76
All-ECAC Hockey Second Team	1976–77

== Career statistics ==
=== Regular season and playoffs ===
			Regular season					Playoffs
Season	Team	League	GP	G	A	Pts	PIM	GP	G	A	Pts	PIM
1971–72	Winthrop High School	MIAA	—	—	—	—	—	—	—	—	—	—
1972–73	Berwick Academy	MPA	—	—	—	—	—	—	—	—	—	—
1973–74	Boston University	ECAC	31	21	19	40	14	—	—	—	—	—
1974–75	Boston University	ECAC	32	27	29	56	20	—	—	—	—	—
1975–76	Boston University	ECAC	30	21	27	48	18	—	—	—	—	—
1976–77	Boston University	ECAC	34	23	41	64	18	—	—	—	—	—
1977–78	Toledo Goaldiggers	IHL	76	30	56	86	43	17	8	13	21	12
1978–79	Toledo Goaldiggers	IHL	74	27	45	72	28	3	1	2	3	2
1978–79	Philadelphia Firebirds	AHL	6	0	0	0	0	—	—	—	—	—
1979–80	United States	Intl	43	18	23	41	20	—	—	—	—	—
ECAC totals			127	92	116	208	70	—	—	—	—	—
IHL totals			150	57	101	158	71	20	9	15	24	14

=== International ===
Year	Team	Event	GP	G	A	Pts	PIM
1975	United States	WC	9	1	2	3	4
1976	United States	WC	10	0	0	0	0
1980	United States	OG	7	3	2	5	2
Senior totals			26	4	4	8	6

Olympic Games
Preceded by Midori Ito	Final Winter Olympic Torchbearer; Salt Lake City 2002; With: the 1980 USA Men's Ice Hockey Team	Succeeded by Stefania Belmondo
