= 1974–75 NCAA Division I men's ice hockey season =

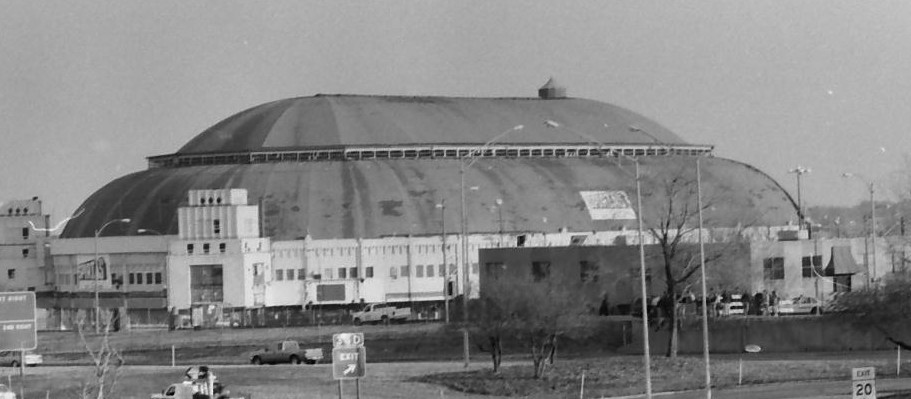
- The St. Louis Arena served as the host for the 1975 Tournament
- Duration: October 1974– March 15, 1975
- NCAA tournament: 1975
- National championship: St. Louis Arena; St. Louis, Missouri
- NCAA champion: Michigan Tech

The 1974–75 NCAA Division I men's ice hockey season began in October 1974 and concluded with the 1975 NCAA Division I Men's Ice Hockey Tournament's championship game on March 15, 1975, at the St. Louis Arena in St. Louis, Missouri. This was the 28th season in which an NCAA ice hockey championship was held and is the 81st year overall where an NCAA school fielded a team.

== Season Outlook ==
=== Pre-season poll ===
The top teams in the nation voted on by coaches before the start of the season. The poll was compiled by radio station WMPL.

WMPL Poll
Rank	Team
1	Michigan Tech
2	Boston University
3	Harvard
4	Minnesota
5	Michigan
6	Wisconsin
7	Notre Dame
8	Cornell
9	Minnesota Duluth
10	New Hampshire

== Regular season ==
=== Season tournaments ===
Tournament	Dates	Teams	Champion
North Country Thanksgiving Festival	November 28–30	4	Bowling Green
Broadmoor International Tournament	December 14–30	4	Czech Nationals
Great Lakes Invitational	December 27–28	4	Michigan Tech
Syracuse Invitational	December 27–28	4	Vermont
Rensselaer Holiday Tournament	December 27–29	4	Northeastern
St. Louis Fireman's Tournament	December 28–30	4	Boston University
Blue–Green Invitational	December 29–30	4	Pennsylvania
ECAC Holiday Hockey Festival	January 3–5	4	Cornell
Beanpot	February 3, 10	4	Boston University

=== Standings ===
1974–75 Big Ten standings
	Conference							Overall					
	GP	W	L	T	PTS	GF	GA	GP	W	L	T	GF	GA
Minnesota†	12	8	4	0	16	46	40	42	31	10	1	187	133
Wisconsin	12	6	6	0	12	35	44	38	24	12	2	174	143
Michigan	12	6	6	0	12	61	54	40	22	17	1	192	167
Michigan State	12	4	8	0	8	54	58	40	22	17	1	191	175
† indicates conference regular season champion

1974–75 Central Collegiate Hockey Association standings
	Conference							Overall					
	GP	W	L	T	PTS	GF	GA	GP	W	L	T	GF	GA
Saint Louis†*	8	5	3	0	10	33	22	40	26	13	1	201	135
Bowling Green	8	4	3	1	9	35	30	35	23	10	2	200	124
Lake Superior State	8	2	5	1	5	27	43	32	17	14	1	177	144
Championship: Saint Louis † indicates conference regular season champion * indicates conference tournament champion

1974–75 ECAC Hockey standings
	Conference							Overall					
	GP	W	L	T	Pct.	GF	GA	GP	W	L	T	GF	GA
Harvard†	20	19	1	0	.950	105	23	29	23	6	0	184	94
Boston University*	22	20	2	0	.909	137	69	32	26	5	1	221	126
Vermont	17	12	5	0	.706	83	63	36	24	12	0	201	131
Cornell	22	15	6	1	.705	132	90	28	17	9	2	157	117
New Hampshire	25	17	7	1	.700	145	87	31	21	9	1	189	116
Providence	19	12	6	1	.658	129	75	27	19	7	1	197	112
Brown	22	13	8	1	.614	97	88	25	15	9	1	120	103
Clarkson	19	9	9	1	.500	97	99	29	13	15	1	142	154
Northeastern	22	10	11	1	.477	100	129	28	15	11	2	136	147
Rensselaer	19	8	10	1	.447	88	107	28	14	13	1	133	155
Pennsylvania	23	9	13	1	.413	94	112	24	10	13	1	98	115
Boston College	20	6	12	2	.350	83	103	28	11	15	2	138	142
St. Lawrence	22	7	14	1	.341	88	114	28	10	17	1	115	138
Princeton	20	5	13	2	.300	70	114	23	6	15	2	79	132
Colgate	22	5	17	0	.227	101	154	27	10	17	0	133	170
Dartmouth	22	4	17	1	.205	93	147	24	5	18	1	106	153
Yale	20	0	19	1	.025	61	136	23	1	21	1	76	152
Championship: Boston University † indicates conference regular season champion * indicates conference tournament champion

1974–75 NCAA Division I Independent ice hockey standings
	Conference							Overall					
	GP	W	L	T	PTS	GF	GA	GP	W	L	T	GF	GA
Air Force	0	0	0	0	-	-	-	30	24	5	1	195	101
Ohio State	0	0	0	0	-	-	-	30	7	22	1	90	173

1974–75 Western Collegiate Hockey Association standings
	Conference							Overall					
	GP	W	L	T	PTS	GF	GA	GP	W	L	T	GF	GA
Minnesota†*	32	24	8	0	48	146	102	42	31	10	1	187	133
Michigan Tech*	32	22	10	0	44	181	108	42	32	10	0	243	136
Colorado College	32	21	11	0	42	165	136	39	23	16	0	196	170
Wisconsin	32	19	11	2	40	138	121	38	24	12	2	174	143
Michigan State	32	19	12	1	39	157	136	40	22	17	1	191	175
Michigan	32	17	15	0	34	158	140	40	22	17	1	192	167
Notre Dame	32	10	19	3	23	115	158	38	13	22	3	141	187
Minnesota-Duluth	32	9	20	3	21	141	166	38	10	24	4	158	192
Denver	32	9	22	1	19	116	175	36	12	23	1	138	190
North Dakota	32	4	26	2	10	98	173	36	6	28	2	115	192
Championship: Michigan Tech, Minnesota † indicates conference regular season champion * indicates conference tournament champion

=== Final regular season polls ===
The final top 10 teams as ranked by coaches (WMPL) before the conference tournament finals.

WMPL Coaches Poll
Ranking	Team
1	Minnesota
2	Boston University
3	Michigan Tech
4	Harvard
5	Michigan State
6	Vermont
6	Michigan
7	Wisconsin
9	Cornell
10	Colorado College

== 1975 NCAA Tournament ==
Semifinals; March 13
E1	Boston University	5
W2	Michigan Tech	9
W1	Minnesota	6
E2	Harvard	4

National championship March 15
W2	Michigan Tech	6
W1	Minnesota	1
Third-place game
E1	Boston University	10
E2	Harvard	5

Note: * denotes overtime period(s)

== Player stats ==
=== Scoring leaders ===
The following players led the league in points at the conclusion of the season.

GP = Games played; G = Goals; A = Assists; Pts = Points; PIM = Penalty minutes

Player	Class	Team	GP	G	A	Pts	PIM
Tom Ross	Junior	Michigan State	40	38	59	97	18
Ron Wilson	Sophomore	Providence	27	26	61	87	12
Bob D'Alvise	Senior	Michigan Tech	42	37	47	84	4
Tim O'Connell	Junior	Vermont	35	40	39	79	26
Bob Dobek	Junior	Bowling Green	35	21	58	79	44
Mike Zuke	Junior	Michigan Tech	42	35	43	78	20
John Sturges	Junior	Michigan State	39	20	52	72	93
Vic Stanfield	Junior	Boston University	32	10	60	70	32
Angie Moretto	Junior	Michigan	38	39	28	67	43
Jamie Hislop	Junior	New Hampshire	31	28	38	66	12

=== Leading goaltenders ===
The following goaltenders led the league in goals against average at the end of the regular season while playing at least 33% of their team's total minutes.

GP = Games played; Min = Minutes played; W = Wins; L = Losses; OT = Overtime/shootout losses; GA = Goals against; SO = Shutouts; SV% = Save percentage; GAA = Goals against average

Player	Class	Team	GP	Min	W	L	OT	GA	SO	SV%	GAA
Larry Thayer	Junior	Minnesota	23	1408	19	3	1	61	2	.904	2.60
Al Sarachman	Senior	Bowling Green	17	-	-	-	-	-	-	-	2.80
Brian Petrovek	Junior	Harvard	23	-	-	-	-	-	1	-	2.85
Peter Reynolds	Junior	Vermont	13	293	-	-	-	14	0	.894	2.87
Jim Warden	Sophomore	Michigan Tech	31	-	19	9	1	103	0	.911	2.96
Lindsay Middlebrook	Junior	Saint Louis	24	1459	-	-	-	71	1	-	2.98
Jeff Tscherne	Sophomore	Minnesota	11	655	7	3	0	36	0	.905	3.30
Mike Dibble	Sophomore	Wisconsin	30	1780	18	8	2	105	1	.894	3.58
Cap Raeder	Sophomore	New Hampshire	27	1559	18	8	1	90	0	.887	3.60
Tom McNamara	Junior	Vermont	32	1867	-	-	-	112	0	.888	3.62

== Awards ==
=== NCAA ===
Award		Recipient
Spencer Penrose Award		Jack Parker, Boston University
Most Outstanding Player in NCAA Tournament		Jim Warden, Michigan Tech
AHCA All-American Teams
East Team	Position	West Team
Brian Petrovek, Harvard	G	Eddie Mio, Colorado College
Vic Stanfield, Boston University	D	Les Auge, Minnesota
Ron Wilson, Providence	D	Brian Engblom, Wisconsin
Rick Meagher, Boston University	F	Bob D'Alvise, Michigan Tech
Tim O'Connell, Vermont	F	Mike Polich, Minnesota
Randy Roth, Harvard	F	Tom Ross, Michigan State

=== CCHA ===
No Awards
All-CCHA Teams
First Team	Position	Second Team
Mike Liut, Bowling Green	G	
Al Sarachman, Bowling Green	G	
Lindsay Middlebrook, Saint Louis	G	
Roger Archer, Bowling Green	D	Kent Jackson, Saint Louis
Kevin O'Rear, Saint Louis	D	Marc Gaudreault, Lake Superior State
Bob Dobek, Bowling Green	F	Mike Hartman, Bowling Green
Doug Ross, Bowling Green	F	Mike Gaba, Lake Superior State
Rick Kennedy, Saint Louis	F	Julio Francella, Lake Superior State

=== ECAC ===
Award		Recipient
Player of the Year		Ron Wilson, Providence
Rookie of the Year		Bob Miller, New Hampshire
Most Outstanding Player in Tournament		Rick Meagher, Boston University
All-ECAC Hockey Teams
First Team	Position	Second Team
Brian Petrovek, Harvard	G	Tom McNamara, Vermont
Brian Durocher, Boston University	G	
Vic Stanfield, Boston University	D	John Glynne, Vermont
Ron Wilson, Providence	D	Peter Brown, Boston University
Mike Eruzione, Boston University	F	Jim Thomas, Harvard
Tim O'Connell, Vermont	F	Dave Peace, Cornell
Jamie Hislop, New Hampshire	F	Randy Roth, Harvard
	F	Rick Meagher, Boston University

=== WCHA ===
Award		Recipient
Most Valuable Player		Mike Polich, Minnesota
		Tom Ross, Michigan State
Freshman of the Year		Jim Warner, Colorado College
Coach of the Year		Jeff Sauer, Colorado College
All-WCHA Teams
First Team	Position	Second Team
Jim Warden, Michigan Tech	G	Eddie Mio, Colorado College
Brian Engblom, Wisconsin	D	Bob Lorimer, Michigan Tech
Gord McDonald, Minnesota-Duluth	D	Les Auge, Minnesota
Tom Ross, Michigan State	F	Mike Zuke, Michigan Tech
Bob D'Alvise, Michigan Tech	F	Jim Warner, Colorado College
Mike Polich, Minnesota	F	Thomas Milani, Minnesota-Duluth

== 1975 NHL Amateur Draft ==
Round	Pick	Player	College	Conference	NHL team
2	19	Peter Scamurra ^{‡}	Wisconsin	WCHA	Washington Capitals
2	22	Brian Engblom	Wisconsin	WCHA	Montreal Canadiens
2	31	Russ Anderson	Minnesota	WCHA	Pittsburgh Penguins
3	39	John Tweedle	Lake Superior State	CCHA	California Golden Seals
3	41	Alex Pirus	Notre Dame	WCHA	Minnesota North Stars
3	50	Clark Hamilton	Notre Dame	WCHA	Detroit Red Wings
3	52	Pat Hughes	Michigan	WCHA	Montreal Canadiens
4	57	Greg Smith	Colorado College	WCHA	California Golden Seals
4	58	Steve Jensen	Michigan Tech	WCHA	Minnesota North Stars
4	67	Stu Younger	Michigan Tech	WCHA	Pittsburgh Penguins
5	75	Doug Young	Michigan Tech	WCHA	California Golden Seals
5	90	Gary Morrison	Michigan	WCHA	Philadelphia Flyers
6	96	Kevin Campbell	St. Lawrence	ECAC Hockey	Toronto Maple Leafs
6	97	Tom Ulseth	Wisconsin	WCHA	Chicago Black Hawks
6	99	Jack Brownschidle	Notre Dame	WCHA	St. Louis Blues
6	102	Randy Koch	Vermont	ECAC Hockey	New York Rangers
6	105	Bob Watson ^{‡}	Bowling Green	CCHA	Vancouver Canucks
6	108	Paul Holmgren	Minnesota	WCHA	Philadelphia Flyers
7	117	Doug Lindskog	Michigan	WCHA	St. Louis Blues
7	122	Gary Carr ^{‡}	Michigan State	WCHA	Boston Bruins
7	124	Tim Burke	New Hampshire	ECAC Hockey	Montreal Canadiens
7	126	Dana Decker	Michigan Tech	WCHA	Philadelphia Flyers
8	128	Joe Baker	Minnesota	WCHA	Kansas City Scouts
8	130	Dean Magee	Colorado College	WCHA	Minnesota North Stars
8	132	Ron Wilson	Providence	ECAC Hockey	Toronto Maple Leafs
8	133	Paul Jensen	Michigan Tech	WCHA	Chicago Black Hawks
8	135	Dick Lamby	Boston University	ECAC Hockey	St. Louis Blues
8	137	Bob Sunderland	Boston University	ECAC Hockey	New York Islanders
8	141	Bill Reber	Vermont	ECAC Hockey	Los Angeles Kings
8	142	Craig Norwich	Wisconsin	WCHA	Montreal Canadiens
9	151	Dave McNab	Wisconsin	WCHA	St. Louis Blues
9	155	Byron Shutt	Bowling Green	CCHA	Pittsburgh Penguins
9	158	Paul Clarke	Notre Dame	WCHA	Montreal Canadiens
10	171	Kevin Nugent	Notre Dame	WCHA	Boston Bruins
10	172	Brian Petrovek	Harvard	ECAC Hockey	Los Angeles Kings
10	173	Bob Ferriter	Boston College	ECAC Hockey	Montreal Canadiens
10	174	Len Moher	Notre Dame	WCHA	Buffalo Sabres
10	175	Duffy Smith	Bowling Green	CCHA	Philadelphia Flyers
11	176	Dave Hanson	Colorado College	WCHA	Detroit Red Wings
11	178	Robin Larson	Minnesota	WCHA	Detroit Red Wings
11	180	Jack Laine	Bowling Green	CCHA	Toronto Maple Leafs
11	184	John McMorrow	Providence	ECAC Hockey	New York Rangers
11	185	John Glynne	Vermont	ECAC Hockey	Pittsburgh Penguins
11	186	Tom Goddard	North Dakota	WCHA	Los Angeles Kings
11	187	Dave Bell	Harvard	ECAC Hockey	Montreal Canadiens
12	191	Gary Burns	New Hampshire	ECAC Hockey	Toronto Maple Leafs
12	195	Tom McNamara	Vermont	ECAC Hockey	New York Rangers
12	196	Lex Hudson	Denver	WCHA	Pittsburgh Penguins
13	200	Steve Roberts	Providence	ECAC Hockey	New York Rangers
13	201	Paul Dionne	Princeton	ECAC Hockey	New York Rangers
13	203	Chuck Carpenter	Yale	ECAC Hockey	Los Angeles Kings
14	205	Cecil Luckern	New Hampshire	ECAC Hockey	New York Rangers
14	207	Bob Fish ^{†}	Minnesota	WCHA	Los Angeles Kings
14	208	Roger Bourque	Notre Dame	WCHA	Montreal Canadiens
15	209	John Corriveau	New Hampshire	ECAC Hockey	New York Rangers
15	210	Dave Taylor	Clarkson	ECAC Hockey	Los Angeles Kings
15	211	Jim Lundquist	Brown	ECAC Hockey	Montreal Canadiens
15	212	Tom Funke ^{†}	Minnesota–Duluth	WCHA	New York Rangers
15	213	Bob Shaw	Clarkson	ECAC Hockey	Los Angeles Kings
15	214	Don Madson ^{†}	Minnesota	WCHA	Montreal Canadiens
16	215	Bob Bain	New Hampshire	ECAC Hockey	Montreal Canadiens

† incoming freshman
‡ Watson, Scamurra and Carr had already left school prior to this season.

== See also ==
- 1974–75 NCAA Division II men's ice hockey season
- 1974–75 NCAA Division III men's ice hockey season
