= Patrick O'Brien Demsey =

American actor

Patrick O'Brien Demsey (born December 14, 1978) is an American actor.

== Early life and education ==
Demsey was born in Danvers, Massachusetts. His parents are Gene and Gail Demsey; he has an older brother, Christopher, and a younger brother, Michael. He graduated from Danvers High School in 1997 and attended Fitchburg State College, playing hockey at both schools, but was forced to quit the sport due to injuries.

== Career ==
Demsey's acting career started with a successful casting call for the 2004 movie Miracle, in which he plays Mike Eruzione, the captain of the U.S. hockey team that defeated the Soviet Union's team in the 1980 Winter Olympics. To prepare for the movie, Demsey trained with the real Eruzione's hockey team.

After Miracle he moved to Sherman Oaks, California, to continue his acting career, but received only one major role opportunity, for the 2006 horror movie Big Bad Wolf, an offer he turned down. He returned to Danvers, worked in construction briefly, but returned to California to give acting another try. He received an offer to play a part in the movie Frail.

== Filmography ==
=== Film ===
Year	Title	Role	Notes
2004	Miracle	Mike Eruzione	
2004	From Hockey to Hollywood: Actors' Journeys	—	Documentary
2007	Women on Top	Greg	
2011	Thor	Agent Cale	
2018	Ice: The Movie	Nick Grantham	

=== Television ===
Year	Title	Role	Notes
2016	Bones	Fields	Episode: "The Head in the Abutment"
