= Michael Mantenuto =

American ice hockey player, actor and soldier (1981-2017)

- Mantenuto in Miracle (2004)
- Born: May 13, 1981; Natick, Massachusetts, U.S.
- Died: April 24, 2017 (aged 35); Des Moines, Washington, U.S.
- Military career
- Allegiance: United States
- Branch: United States Army
- Service years: 2010–2017
- Rank: Staff sergeant
- Unit: 1st Special Forces Group
- Conflicts: War on terror: Operation Inherent Resolve

Michael Mantenuto (May 13, 1981 – April 24, 2017) was an American college ice hockey player, film actor, and Army non-commissioned officer, best known for his performance as Olympic ice hockey star Jack O'Callahan in the 2004 Disney film Miracle.

== Early life and sports ==
Michael Mantenuto was born on May 13, 1981, in Natick, Massachusetts, to parents Ed Mantenuto and Kerry Lee Barton. He had three sisters. Mantenuto is of Italian descent. His father, the assistant principal and the school hockey coach at Holliston High School, taught him how to play hockey at an early age and eventually became his high school coach. He is an alumnus of the University of Maine, where he played one season for the Maine Black Bears men's ice hockey squad; following that season he transferred to the University of Massachusetts at Boston and played one additional season for their team while taking acting classes.

== Film career ==
His time playing hockey allowed him the opportunity to audition for, and ultimately win, the Miracle (2004) role of Jack O'Callahan, a player on the 1980 Olympic men's ice hockey team, who beat the Soviet Union team in a game that is now referred to as the "Miracle on Ice". During auditions, Mantenuto got into a fight with another player in front of director Gavin O'Connor, after the player was picking on other actors. This impressed O'Connor and led to Mantenuto receiving the role of O'Callahan. The real Jack O'Callahan praised Mantenuto for his performance. Mantenuto stated the film allowed him to combine the important aspects of his life, "to be able to combine the acting, all the expression, the hockey, and be able to segue from one career that I loved so much to another where I wanted my life to go ... It was pretty special".

After Miracle finished filming, Mantenuto moved to California to pursue an acting career. He appeared in only two other films, including the Matthew McConaughey feature Surfer, Dude (2008).

== U.S. Army service ==
After a short Hollywood career, he ultimately enlisted in the United States Army and served as a Special Forces communications sergeant and dog handler ("Green Beret"). Mantenuto was part of ODA 1222, B Co., 2nd BN, 1st Special Forces Group, and HHC, 1st Special Forces Group, according to his Army Special Operations Command bio in 2016 he was deployed in support of Operation Inherent Resolve. Army Times reported that during his service he was awarded the Army Commendation Medal, three Army Achievement Medals, three Good Conduct Medals and the Global War on Terrorism Service Medal. Additionally, Mantenuto created and led a mental health and substance abuse program for soldiers under the supervision of his command. While taking a course to qualify for the special forces, Mantenuto started a youth hockey program with Morale, Welfare and Recreation (MWR). Mantenuto also participated in Survival, Evasion, Resistance and Escape (SERE) training.

== Personal life ==
Mantenuto was married to Kati Vienneau. They had a daughter, Ava, and a son, Leo. He was one of the coaches of his son Leo who also plays hockey. As of 2024, Leo currently plays junior hockey for the Surrey Eagles.

== Death ==
On April 24, 2017, Mantenuto was found dead of a self-inflicted gunshot wound at the age of 35 in his car at Saltwater State Park in Des Moines, Washington. At the time of his death, he was stationed in Fort Lewis. His death was officially ruled a suicide.
