= Vic Stanfield =

Canadian ice hockey player (b.1951)

- Born: May 12, 1951 (age 75) Mississauga, Ontario, Canada
- Height: 5 ft 10 in (178 cm)
- Weight: 233 lb (106 kg; 16 st 9 lb)
- Position: Defence
- Played for: Krefelder EV; Kölner EC
- Playing career: 1975–1988

Vic Stanfield (born 12 May 1951) is a Canadian former professional ice hockey player.

He was a two-time All-American for Boston University, and went on to play eight seasons in the German Bundesliga for the Krefeld Pinguine, becoming the team's all-time leading scorer.

He graduated from Boston University in 1975.

== Awards and honors ==
Award	Year
All-ECAC Hockey First Team	1972–73
All-ECAC Hockey First Team	1973–74
AHCA East All-American	1973–74
All-ECAC Hockey First Team	1974–75
AHCA East All-American	1974–75

Awards and achievements
Preceded by Don Cutts	ECAC Hockey Rookie of the Year; 1972–73	Succeeded by Ron Wilson
