= Brian Petrovek =

American ice hockey player and executive

- Born: March 24, 1955 (age 71) Norwood, Massachusetts, U.S.
- Height: 5 ft 8 in (173 cm)
- Weight: 161 lb (73 kg; 11 st 7 lb)
- Position: Goaltender
- Played for: Harvard University (ECAC)
- NHL draft: 172nd overall, 1975; Los Angeles Kings
- WHA draft: 143rd overall, 1975; Edmonton Oilers
- Playing career: 1973–1977

Brian Petrovek (born March 24, 1955) is an American former ice hockey goaltender and hockey executive. He was selected by the Los Angeles Kings in the 10th round (172nd overall) of the 1975 NHL Amateur Draft, and was also drafted by the Edmonton Oilers in the 11th round (143rd overall) of the 1975 WHA Amateur Draft.

Petrovek attended Harvard University, where he played NCAA Division I hockey with the Harvard Crimson of the ECAC Hockey conference. As a goaltender, following his standout 1974-75 sophomore season, Petrovek was named to both the All-Ivy League First Team and the NCAA (East) First All-American Team. In his senior year Petrovek was named to the 1976-77 All-Ivy League First Team, and was also selected as the Most Valuable Player of the 1977 Beanpot. In 1998, Petrovek was inducted into the Harvard University Athletic Hall of Fame.

From 1989 to 1993, Petrovek worked as vice president of marketing for the New Jersey Devils of the National Hockey League. In June 1993, he joined the national staff of USA Hockey, and in 1998 he was elevated to the position of executive director. While with USA Hockey, Petrovek served as team leader for the United States men's national ice hockey team at the 1996 World Cup of Hockey, 1997 Men's World Ice Hockey Championships, and the 1998 Winter Olympics.

From 2000 until April 2014, Petrovek served as the managing owner for the Portland Pirates of the American Hockey League (AHL). On March 22, 2013, Petrovek accepted a plea deal for operating under the influence after driving his Jeep into a divider while intoxicated over three times the legal limit.

On May 16, 2014, Petrovek was named the president of the Adirondack Flames of the AHL by the Calgary Flames. He stayed in Glens Falls, New York, when the Calgary Flames moved their AHL franchise to Stockton, California, in 2015 and took the same position with their ECHL team, the Adirondack Thunder. In 2017, Petrovek became the president of the Stockton Heat of the AHL, a position he held until he was fired in February 2020.

== Awards and achievements ==
Award	Year
NCAA All-Ivy League First Team	1974–75
All-ECAC Hockey First Team	1974–75
AHCA East All-American	1974–75
NCAA All-Ivy League First Team	1976–77
Beanpot Most Valuable Player	1977
