= Bob Lorimer =

Canadian ice hockey player

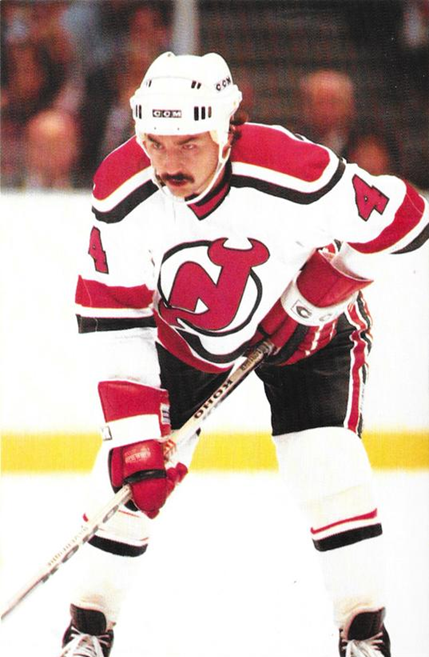
- Born: August 25, 1953 (age 72) Toronto, Ontario, Canada
- Height: 6 ft 1 in (185 cm)
- Weight: 201 lb (91 kg; 14 st 5 lb)
- Position: Defence
- Shot: Right
- Played for: New York Islanders; Colorado Rockies; New Jersey Devils
- NHL draft: 129th overall, 1973; New York Islanders
- Playing career: 1975–1986

Robert Roy Lorimer (born August 25, 1953) is a Canadian former ice hockey defenceman.

Born in Toronto, Ontario, Lorimer started his National Hockey League career with the New York Islanders in 1976. He also played for the Colorado Rockies and New Jersey Devils. He retired after the 1986 season. He won the Stanley Cup twice with New York, in 1980 and 1981.

== Career statistics ==
=== Regular season and playoffs ===
			Regular season					Playoffs
Season	Team	League	GP	G	A	Pts	PIM	GP	G	A	Pts	PIM
1970–71	Aurora Tigers	OHA-B	—	—	—	—	—	—	—	—	—	—
1971–72	Michigan Tech	WCHA	32	1	7	8	63	—	—	—	—	—
1972–73	Michigan Tech	WCHA	38	2	9	11	74	—	—	—	—	—
1973–74	Michigan Tech	WCHA	39	3	18	21	46	—	—	—	—	—
1974–75	Michigan Tech	WCHA	38	10	21	31	68	—	—	—	—	—
1975–76	Fort Worth Texans	CHL	2	0	0	0	2	—	—	—	—	—
1975–76	Muskegon Mohawks	IHL	78	6	21	27	94	—	—	—	—	—
1975–76	Oklahoma City Blazers	CHL	—	—	—	—	—	3	0	0	0	2
1976–77	New York Islanders	NHL	1	0	1	1	0	—	—	—	—	—
1976–77	Fort Worth Texans	CHL	28	4	6	10	38	6	0	0	0	17
1977–78	New York Islanders	NHL	5	1	0	1	0	—	—	—	—	—
1977–78	Fort Worth Texans	CHL	71	6	13	19	81	14	1	7	8	25
1978–79	New York Islanders	NHL	67	3	18	21	42	10	1	3	4	15
1979–80	New York Islanders	NHL	74	3	16	19	53	21	1	3	4	41
1980–81	New York Islanders	NHL	73	1	12	13	77	18	1	4	5	27
1981–82	Colorado Rockies	NHL	79	5	15	20	68	—	—	—	—	—
1982–83	New Jersey Devils	NHL	66	3	10	13	42	—	—	—	—	—
1983–84	New Jersey Devils	NHL	72	2	10	12	62	—	—	—	—	—
1984–85	New Jersey Devils	NHL	46	2	6	8	35	—	—	—	—	—
1985–86	New Jersey Devils	NHL	46	2	2	4	52	—	—	—	—	—
NHL totals			529	22	90	112	431	49	3	10	13	83

== Awards and honors ==
Award	Year
All-WCHA Second Team	1974–75
All-NCAA All-Tournament Team	1975
