= Bob D'Alvise =

Canadian ice hockey player

- Born: December 23, 1952 (age 73) Etobicoke, Ontario, Canada
- Height: 5 ft 11 in (180 cm)
- Weight: 185 lb (84 kg; 13 st 3 lb)
- Position: Centre
- Shot: Left
- Played for: WHA; Toronto Toros; NAHL; Buffalo Norsemen; SHL; Charlotte Checkers
- NHL draft: Undrafted
- Playing career: 1975–1977

Robert D'Alvise (born December 23, 1952) is a Canadian former professional ice hockey player.

== Early life ==
D'Alvise was born in Etobicoke. As a youth, he played in the 1965 Quebec International Pee-Wee Hockey Tournament with the Toronto Faustina minor ice hockey team.

== Career ==
During the 1975–76 season, D'Alvise played 59 games in the World Hockey Association with the Toronto Toros.

== Personal life ==
His brother is Dan D'Alvise, who represented Canada at the 1980 Winter Olympics.

== Career statistics ==
			Regular season					Playoffs
Season	Team	League	GP	G	A	Pts	PIM	GP	G	A	Pts	PIM
1969–70	Markham Waxers	MetJBHL	—	—	—	—	—	—	—	—	—	—
1970–71	Markham Waxers	MetJBHL	—	—	—	—	—	—	—	—	—	—
1971–72	Michigan Tech	NCAA	30	11	10	21	6	—	—	—	—	—
1972–73	Michigan Tech	NCAA	37	23	21	44	4	—	—	—	—	—
1973–74	Michigan Tech	NCAA	40	29	39	68	6	—	—	—	—	—
1974–75	Michigan Tech	NCAA	42	37	47	84	4	—	—	—	—	—
1975–76	Toronto Toros	WHA	59	5	8	13	10	—	—	—	—	—
1975–76	Buffalo Norsemen	NAHL-Sr.	19	13	15	28	2	—	—	—	—	—
1976–77	Charlotte Checkers	SHL-Sr.	4	0	2	2	0	—	—	—	—	—
WHA totals			59	5	8	13	10	—	—	—	—	—

== Awards and honors ==
Award	Year
All-WCHA First Team	1974–75
AHCA West All-American	1974–75
All-NCAA All-Tournament Team	1975
