= Peter Brown (ice hockey) =

American ice hockey player (born 1954)

- Born: May 21, 1954 (age 71) Boston, Massachusetts, U.S.
- Height: 6 ft 2 in (188 cm)
- Weight: 190 lb (86 kg; 13 st 8 lb)
- Position: Defense
- Shot: Left
- Played for: AHL; Springfield Indians; IHL; Dayton Gems; Fort Wayne Komets; Toledo Goaldiggers
- NHL draft: 118th overall, 1974; Atlanta Flames
- WHA draft: 43rd overall, 1974; New England Whalers
- Playing career: 1976–1979

Peter Brown (born May 21, 1954) is an American retired professional ice hockey defenseman. He was selected by the Atlanta Flames in the seventh round (118th overall) of the 1974 NHL entry draft, and was also selected by the New England Whalers in the third round (43rd overall) of the 1974 WHA Amateur Draft.

In January 1979, the Toledo Goaldiggers traded Brown to the Fort Wayne Komets in exchange for goaltender Norm LaPointe.

== Career statistics ==
			Regular season					Playoffs
Season	Team	League	GP	G	A	Pts	PIM	GP	G	A	Pts	PIM
1972–73	Boston University	NCAA	18	3	15	18	8	—	—	—	—	—
1973–74	Boston University	NCAA	31	4	38	42	36	—	—	—	—	—
1974–75	Boston University	NCAA	22	6	27	33	18	—	—	—	—	—
1975–76	Boston University	NCAA	30	9	42	51	54	—	—	—	—	—
1976–77	Dayton Gems	IHL	78	8	37	45	58	4	0	0	0	4
1978–79	Springfield Indians	AHL	27	0	4	4	24	—	—	—	—	—
1978–79	Fort Wayne Komets	IHL	10	2	2	4	12	—	—	—	—	—
1978–79	Toledo Goaldiggers	IHL	37	1	12	13	52	—	—	—	—	—
AHL totals			27	0	4	4	24	—	—	—	—	—
IHL totals			125	11	51	62	122	4	0	0	0	4

== Awards and honors ==
Award	Year
All-ECAC Hockey Second Team	1973–74
All-ECAC Hockey Second Team	1974–75
All-ECAC Hockey First Team	1975–76
AHCA East All-American	1975–76

Awards and achievements
Preceded by Ron Wilson	ECAC Hockey Player of the Year; 1975–76	Succeeded by Dave Taylor
