= Steve Jensen =

American ice hockey player (1955–2022)

- Born: April 14, 1955 Minneapolis, Minnesota, U.S.
- Died: November 29, 2022 (aged 67)
- Height: 6 ft 2 in (188 cm)
- Weight: 190 lb (86 kg; 13 st 8 lb)
- Position: Left wing
- Shot: Left
- Played for: Minnesota North Stars; Los Angeles Kings
- National team: United States
- NHL draft: 58th overall, 1975; Minnesota North Stars
- WHA draft: 64th overall, 1974; Vancouver Blazers
- Playing career: 1975–1986

Steven Allan Jensen (April 14, 1955 – November 29, 2022) was an American professional ice hockey player and owner and director of Heartland Hockey Camps. Jensen was a forward who appeared in 438 games in the National Hockey League from 1976–82. For 39 years, Jensen served as founding owner and director of the Heartland Hockey Camp located in Deerwood, Minnesota, and was a full-time teaching professional with more than four decades of instruction experience, including 12 years of experience playing International and NHL hockey. He was a five-time member of the United States men's national ice hockey team and played in the 1976 Canada Cup.

== Early life and college ==
As a hockey player at Armstrong High School, in Plymouth, Minnesota, Jensen was an All-State performer. At the college level, he was a participant in 2 NCAA championship games, helping win the National Championship, in 1975, while playing at Michigan Tech. For two consecutive years, Jensen was named to the NCAA All-Tournament Team. As a freshman at MTU, Jensen was awarded the Matovich Top Student/Athlete Award

== Hockey career ==
Jensen started his professional career in his hometown with the Minnesota North Stars, and in 1977 he helped make history when the North Stars become the first team in the NHL to have four rookies score 20 or more goals. He then played four years with the Los Angeles Kings, where he became only the fifth American in NHL history to score more than 100 career goals. During the 1980–81 and 1981-82 NHL seasons Jensen was the active leading goal scoring American in the NHL. After retiring from the NHL, Jensen spent four seasons playing and coaching in the professional leagues of Switzerland and Austria. During the 1983-84 Swiss-2 season, while playing for EVZ in Zug, Jensen became the only hockey player in Swiss history to score seven goals in a pro game. During his two seasons as a player in Switzerland, he had 61 goals in 56 games.

Jensen also had extensive experience in international hockey. As a member of the 1976 U.S. Olympic Hockey Team, he led the team in goal scoring with 52 goals. During the 1976 Olympic Games, in Innsbruck, Austria, Jensen tied with Russia's Vladimir Shadrin with six goals in six games, to lead the tournament in goals scored. During the 1976 World Ice Hockey Championships, in Katowice, Poland, three months after the Olympics, Jensen led Team USA in scoring with four goals and five assists in nine games. Jensen was also on Team USA's preliminary roster for the 1979 World Championships in Vienna, Austria, and the 1981 Canada Cup, but declined the invitations in order to operate his summer hockey camp business. Jensen did play for the U.S. National Team in 1983, winning the Pool B 1983 Ice Hockey World Championships, in Tokyo, Japan.

== Career statistics ==
=== Regular season and playoffs ===
			Regular season					Playoffs
Season	Team	League	GP	G	A	Pts	PIM	GP	G	A	Pts	PIM
1973–74	Michigan Tech	WCHA	40	17	9	26	32	—	—	—	—	—
1974–75	Michigan Tech	WCHA	41	16	32	48	18	—	—	—	—	—
1974–75	American National Team	Intl	17	4	1	5	—	—	—	—	—	—
1975–76	Minnesota North Stars	NHL	19	7	6	13	6	—	—	—	—	—
1975–76	American National Team	Intl	64	52	44	96	42	—	—	—	—	—
1976–77	Minnesota North Stars	NHL	78	22	23	45	62	2	0	1	1	0
1977–78	Minnesota North Stars	NHL	74	13	17	30	73	—	—	—	—	—
1977–78	Fort Worth Texans	CHL	3	0	1	1	2	—	—	—	—	—
1978–79	Los Angeles Kings	NHL	72	23	8	31	57	2	0	0	0	0
1979–80	Los Angeles Kings	NHL	76	21	15	36	13	4	0	0	0	2
1980–81	Los Angeles Kings	NHL	74	19	19	38	88	4	0	2	2	7
1981–82	Los Angeles Kings	NHL	45	8	19	27	19	—	—	—	—	—
1981–82	New Haven Nighthawks	AHL	14	5	8	13	4	1	0	0	0	0
1983–84	Grazer SV	AUT	31	28	35	63	28	—	—	—	—	—
1983–84	EV Zug	NLB	16	23	13	36	—	—	—	—	—	—
1984–85	EV Zug	NLB	40	38	20	58	—	—	—	—	—	—
1985–86	Springfield Indians	AHL	4	3	3	6	2	—	—	—	—	—
1985–86	ATSE Graz	AUT-2	—	—	—	—	—	—	—	—	—	—
NHL totals			438	113	107	220	318	12	0	3	3	9

=== International ===
Year	Team	Event	GP	G	A	Pts	PIM
1975	United States	WC	9	2	0	2	2
1976	United States	OLY	6	6	0	6	10
1976	United States	WC	7	4	5	9	8
1976	United States	CC	5	1	0	1	2
1978	United States	WC	10	3	0	3	2
1983	United States	WC-B	7	3	6	9	—
Senior totals			44	20	11	30	—

== Positions ==
- 1983 Assistant Coach, U.S. National Team, World Championships
- 1984 Austrian League, Head Coach for GSV in Graz, Austria
- 1985 Austrian League, Head Coach for ATSE in Graz, Austria
- 1992 Jr. B USA Hockey National Runners-up, Head Coach Heartland Winterhawks
- 1993 USA Hockey Festival Champions, Assistant Coach of Team West
- 2005 ACHA National Championship Runners-up, Head Coach FGCU
- 2006 1st Head Coach in ACHA history to lead a # 16 seed to victory over # 1 seed
- 2007 Led FGCU to their 4th consecutive ACHA National Tournament appearance
- 2007 Led all coaches in the college hockey ranks with 34 wins at FGCU
- 2008 Tier 1, USA Hockey UI8 State Champions, Coach of Everblades
- 2008 Tier 1, USA Hockey SE Regional Championship Runners-up, Coach of Everblades
- 2008 Tier 1, USA Hockey, Over 50 National Champions, Head Coach
- 2009 Tier 1, USA Hockey, Over 50 National Championship Runners-up, Head Coach
- 2010 Tier 1, USA Hockey, Over 50 National Champions, Head Coach

Jensen served USA Hockey for 17 years as a certified hockey official. From 1985 to 1998, he officiated over 1,500 USA youth hockey games. He served as Head Scout of the USA Hockey SE Region for the Aberdeen Wings, a member of the North American Hockey League.

Jensen was the first Minnesota-born hockey player to attend Michigan Tech on a scholarship. He worked for CBS Sports as a color commentator during the 1976 Stanley Cup playoffs, and had a brief appearance in the 1981 film Airplane II. In 1985, he became the first entrepreneur to privately own an ice arena in the state of Minnesota.

The Heartland Hockey Camp, which Jensen founded in 1985, was named Small Business Success Story, by Twin Cities Business Magazine, in 2009.

== Personal life and death ==
Steve Jensen was the uncle of Washington Capitals blue-liner Nick Jensen.

Jensen died on November 29, 2022, at the age of 67.

== Awards and honors ==
Award	Year
All-NCAA All-Tournament Team	1974, 1975
