= Jim Craig (ice hockey) =

American ice hockey goaltender

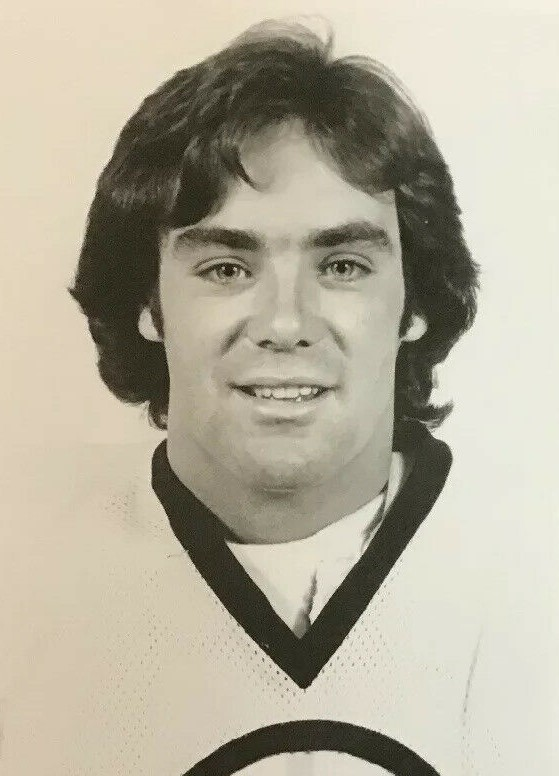
- Craig in 1981
- Born: May 31, 1957 (age 69) Easton, Massachusetts, U.S.
- Height: 6 ft 1 in (185 cm)
- Weight: 190 lb (86 kg; 13 st 8 lb)
- Position: Goaltender
- Caught: Left
- Played for: Atlanta Flames; Boston Bruins; Minnesota North Stars
- National team: United States
- NHL draft: 72nd overall, 1977; Atlanta Flames
- WHA draft: 79th overall, 1977; Cincinnati Stingers
- Playing career: 1980–1984
Medal record
Men's ice hockey
Representing the United States
Olympic Games
Gold medal – first place	1980 Lake Placid	Team competition

James Downey Craig (born May 31, 1957) is an American former ice hockey goaltender who is best known for being part of the U.S. Olympic hockey team that won the gold medal at the 1980 Winter Olympics. Craig had a standout Olympic tournament, including stopping 36 of 39 shots on goal by the heavily favored Soviet Union in the 'Miracle on Ice', as the U.S. won 4–3, in what is widely considered one of the greatest upsets in sports history. Two days later, the U.S. defeated Finland, 4–2, to clinch Olympic gold. Craig went on to play professionally in the National Hockey League (NHL) for the Atlanta Flames, Boston Bruins, and Minnesota North Stars from 1980 to 1983. He was inducted into IIHF Hall of Fame in 1999.

== Playing career ==
=== Amateur career ===
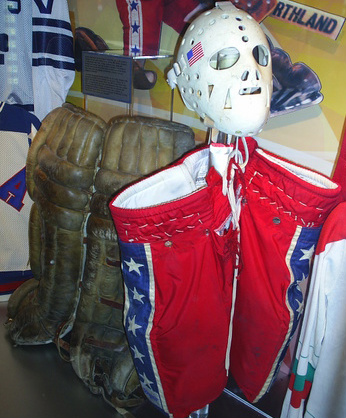
Jim Craig's equipment from the 1980 Olympics, on display at the HHOF

After starring at Oliver Ames High School in his hometown, Craig spent one year at Massasoit Community College in Brockton, Massachusetts. He then transferred to Boston University, leading the Terriers to the NCAA Division I championship in 1978 and was an NCAA All-Star in 1979. He was inducted into the BU Hall of Fame in 1989.

=== 1980 Winter Olympics ===
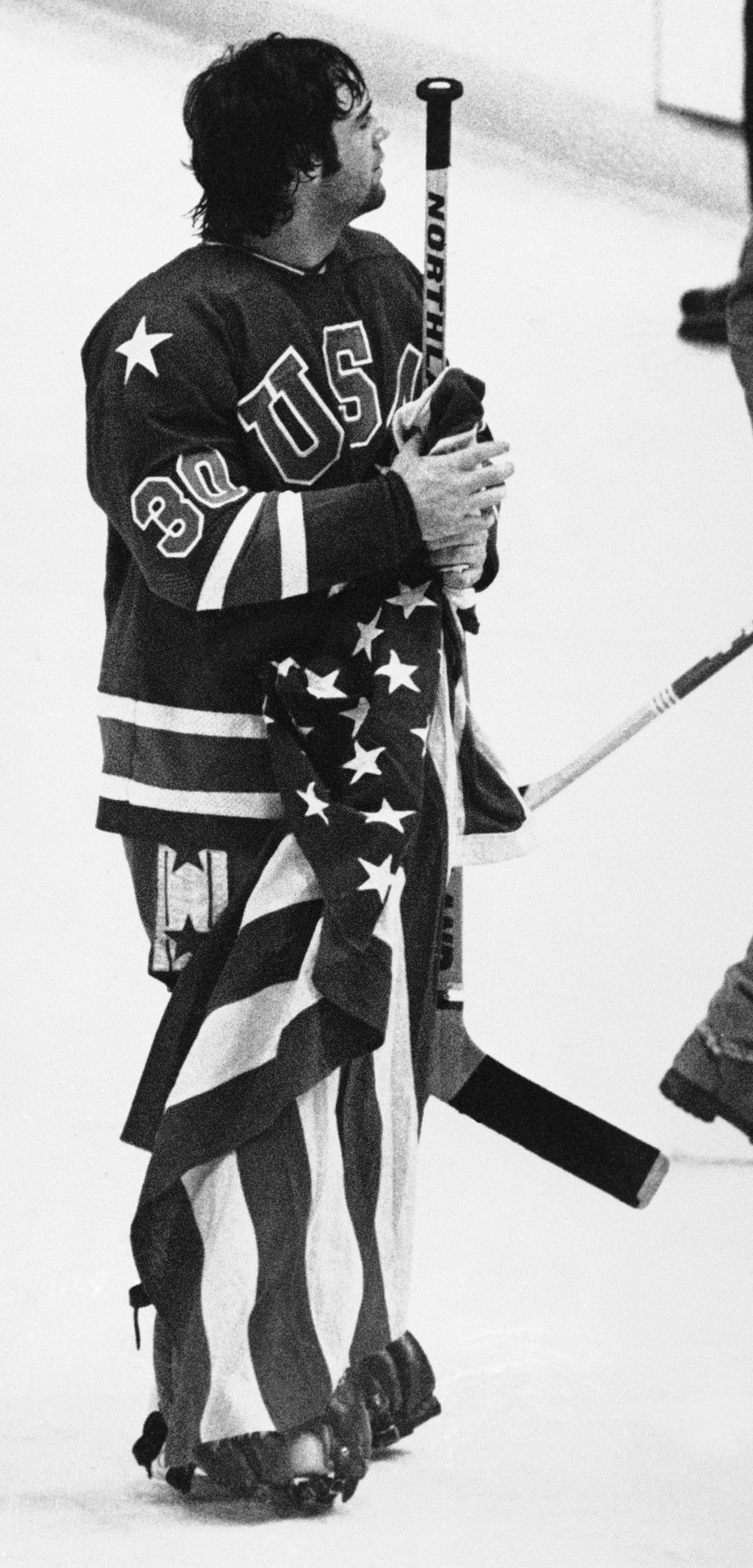
Craig clutching an American flag after his team won the gold medal

After Craig was selected to be the goaltender for the United States men's national ice hockey team at the 1980 Winter Olympics, he wanted to live with a family during national team training, and chose to live with the team's doctor, George Nagobads and his family.

Craig played a key role in one of the landmark moments in United States sports history, as the goalie for the United States in the Miracle on Ice, when the 1980 U.S. Olympic hockey team defeated the favored Soviet Olympic hockey team, which was led by veterans including greats Boris Mikhailov and Vladislav Tretiak. In that game, Craig stopped 36 of 39 shots from the Soviet team. His composure was evident in the final moments of the game and allowed the unheralded U.S. team to protect their one-goal lead and win 4–3. The American flag that Craig draped over his shoulders after the upset was displayed at the Sports Museum of America in New York City. Two days later, he led the U.S. to the gold medal in a 4–2 victory over Finland.

=== Professional career ===
Originally drafted by the Atlanta Flames with the 72nd pick in the 1977 NHL entry draft, Craig joined the Flames shortly after the Olympics and won his first game as an NHL player. However, he found it difficult to duplicate his magic in the NHL. The following season, the Boston Bruins brought him home to Massachusetts in a trade with Atlanta. He served as the Bruins' backup goaltender during the 1980-81 regular season but again failed to make an impression and he did not participate in the 1981 NHL Playoffs. Craig returned to the U.S. national team for the 1981 Canada Cup but missed the tournament due to injury and the following season was spent in the minor leagues with the Erie Blades. Craig's final moment of glory was in 1983 when he again played very well for the United States in the 1983 IIHF Pool B tournament. Craig was named goaltender of the tournament and the Minnesota North Stars promptly signed him to a free agent contract. He would make a final three NHL appearances for the North Stars in 1984 before retiring from hockey.

== Personal life ==
Two years after the Lake Placid victory, he was issued a citation charging him with "driving to endanger after an accident on a rain-slicked highway that left one woman dead and another critically injured". Although neither alcohol nor drugs was a factor in the accident, the charge was later changed to motor vehicle homicide. He pleaded not guilty and waived his right to a jury trial, electing to go before a judge instead. He was found not guilty by a Wareham District Court judge in September 1982.

Craig is employed as a motivational speaker, spokesperson, marketing and sales strategist. He is president of Gold Medal Strategies, a Boston-area based promotions and marketing firm that also manages and represents Jim and his appearance business. For more than 30 years, Craig has provided strategic direction for employees and associates from more than 300 organizations.

His daughter Taylor is married to NHL player Jayson Megna.

Musician Dave Grohl has mentioned being an admirer of Craig over the years, as evidenced by the #6 entry of the "47 Things You Might Not Know About Dave Grohl" list on TeamRock.com, which stated, "Dave’s first hero was Jim Craig, the 1980 American ice hockey team goalie from Easton, Massachusetts. After the team beat Russia, he found the phone numbers of all the Jim Craigs in that area, phoned them up and congratulated them. Dave and the real Jim Craig met years later at a Winter Olympics."

== In popular culture ==
In the 1981 made-for-TV movie film Miracle on Ice, Craig is portrayed by Steve Guttenberg.

In the 2004 Disney film Miracle, he is portrayed by Eddie Cahill, who considers Craig to be one of his childhood heroes.

== Career statistics ==
=== Regular season and playoffs ===
			Regular season									Playoffs
Season	Team	League	GP	W	L	T	MIN	GA	SO	GAA	SV%	GP	W	L	MIN	GA	SO	GAA	SV%
1974–75	Oliver Ames High School	HS-MA	57	54	2	1	3420	118	—	2.11	—	—	—	—	—	—	—	—	—
1975–76	Massasoit Junior College	NCAA-II	—	—	—	—	—	—	—	—	—	—	—	—	—	—	—	—	—
1976–77	Boston University	ECAC	27	25	1	1	—	—	—	—	—	—	—	—	—	—	—	—	—
1977–78	Boston University	ECAC	16	16	0	0	967	60	0	3.72	—	5	5	0	305	17	0	3.34	—
1978–79	Boston University	ECAC	19	13	4	2	1009	60	1	3.57	—	2	1	1	120	8	0	4.00	—
1979–80	United States	Intl	41	—	—	—	—	—	—	—	—	—	—	—	—	—	—	—	—
1979–80	Atlanta Flames	NHL	4	1	2	1	206	13	0	3.79	.841	—	—	—	—	—	—	—	—
1980–81	Boston Bruins	NHL	23	9	7	6	1270	78	0	3.68	.861	—	—	—	—	—	—	—	—
1981–82	Erie Blades	AHL	13	3	9	1	742	57	0	4.61	—	—	—	—	—	—	—	—	—
1982–83	United States	Intl	26	—	—	—	1385	61	2	2.64	—	—	—	—	—	—	—	—	—
1983–84	Minnesota North Stars	NHL	3	1	1	0	110	9	0	4.92	.839	—	—	—	—	—	—	—	—
1983–84	Salt Lake Golden Eagles	CHL	27	—	—	—	1532	108	1	4.23	—	3	—	—	177	12	0	4.07	—
NHL totals			30	11	10	7	1586	100	0	3.78	.857	—	—	—	—	—	—	—	—

=== International ===
Year	Team	Event	GP	W	L	T	MIN	GA	SO	GAA
1979	United States	WC	5	2	1	2	280	10	0	2.14
1980	United States	OLY	7	6	0	1	420	15	0	2.14
1983	United States	WC-B	—	—	—	—	—	—	—	—
Senior totals			13	8	1	3	700	25	0	2.14

== Awards and achievements ==
- ECAC First All-Star Team (1979)
- NCAA East First All-American Team (1979)
- Olympic Gold Medal Team U.S.A. (1980)
- Ice Hockey World Championships B Pool Tournament All-Star Team (1983)
- Inducted into IIHF Hall of Fame in 1999
