= 1975 ECAC Hockey men's ice hockey tournament =

1975 ECAC Men's ice hockey tournament
- Dates: March 4–8, 1975
- Teams: 8
- Finals site: Boston Garden; Boston, Massachusetts
- Champions: Boston University (3rd title)
- Winning coach: Jack Parker (2nd title)
- MVP: Rick Meagher (Boston University)
- ECAC Men's Ice Hockey Tournaments

The 1975 ECAC Hockey Men's Ice Hockey Tournament was the 14th tournament in league history. It was played between March 4 and March 8, 1975. Quarterfinal games were played at home team campus sites, while the 'final four' games were played at the Boston Garden in Boston, Massachusetts. By reaching the championship game both, Boston University and Harvard received invitations to participate in the 1975 NCAA Division I Men's Ice Hockey Tournament.

== Format ==
The tournament featured three rounds of play, all of which were single-elimination. The top eight teams, based on winning percentage, qualified to participate in the tournament. In the quarterfinals the first seed and eighth seed, the second seed and seventh seed, the third seed and sixth seed and the fourth seed and fifth seed played against one another. In the semifinals, the highest seed plays the lowest remaining seed while the two remaining teams play with the winners advancing to the championship game and the losers advancing to the third place game.

== Conference standings ==
Note: GP = Games played; W = Wins; L = Losses; T = Ties; Pct. = Winning percentage; GF = Goals for; GA = Goals against

1974–75 ECAC Hockey standings
	Conference							Overall					
	GP	W	L	T	Pct.	GF	GA	GP	W	L	T	GF	GA
Harvard†	20	19	1	0	.950	105	23	29	23	6	0	184	94
Boston University*	22	20	2	0	.909	137	69	32	26	5	1	221	126
Vermont	17	12	5	0	.706	83	63	36	24	12	0	201	131
Cornell	22	15	6	1	.705	132	90	28	17	9	2	157	117
New Hampshire	25	17	7	1	.700	145	87	31	21	9	1	189	116
Providence	19	12	6	1	.658	129	75	27	19	7	1	197	112
Brown	22	13	8	1	.614	97	88	25	15	9	1	120	103
Clarkson	19	9	9	1	.500	97	99	29	13	15	1	142	154
Northeastern	22	10	11	1	.477	100	129	28	15	11	2	136	147
Rensselaer	19	8	10	1	.447	88	107	28	14	13	1	133	155
Pennsylvania	23	9	13	1	.413	94	112	24	10	13	1	98	115
Boston College	20	6	12	2	.350	83	103	28	11	15	2	138	142
St. Lawrence	22	7	14	1	.341	88	114	28	10	17	1	115	138
Princeton	20	5	13	2	.300	70	114	23	6	15	2	79	132
Colgate	22	5	17	0	.227	101	154	27	10	17	0	133	170
Dartmouth	22	4	17	1	.205	93	147	24	5	18	1	106	153
Yale	20	0	19	1	.025	61	136	23	1	21	1	76	152
Championship: Boston University † indicates conference regular season champion * indicates conference tournament champion

== Bracket ==
Teams are reseeded after the first round

Quarterfinals; March 4
1	Harvard	10
8	Clarkson	5
2	Boston University	5*
7	Brown	4
3	Vermont	7
6	Providence	5
4	Cornell	4
5	New Hampshire	2

Semifinals; March 7
1	Harvard	6
4	Cornell	4
2	Boston University	7
3	Vermont	3

Championship; March 8
1	Harvard	3
2	Boston University	7
Third Place
3	Vermont	7
4	Cornell	3

Note: * denotes overtime period(s)

=== Quarterfinals ===
==== (1) Harvard vs. (8) Clarkson ====
March 4	Harvard	10 – 5	Clarkson	Donald C. Watson Rink

==== (2) Boston University vs. (7) Brown ====
March 4	Boston University	5 – 4	OT	Brown	Walter Brown Arena

==== (3) Vermont vs. (6) Providence ====
March 4	Vermont	7 – 5	Providence	Gutterson Fieldhouse

==== (4) Cornell vs. (5) New Hampshire ====
March 4	Cornell	4 – 2	New Hampshire	Lynah Rink

=== Semifinals ===
==== (1) Harvard vs. (4) Cornell ====
March 7	Harvard	6 – 4	Cornell	Boston Garden

==== (2) Boston University vs. (3) Vermont ====
March 7	Boston University	7 – 3	Vermont	Boston Garden

=== Third Place ===
==== (3) Vermont vs. (4) Cornell ====
March 8	Vermont	7 – 3	Cornell	Boston Garden

=== Championship ===
==== (1) Harvard vs. (2) Boston University ====
March 8	Harvard	3 – 7	Boston University	Boston Garden

== Tournament awards ==
=== All-Tournament Team ===
None

=== MOP ===
- Rick Meagher (Boston University)
