= Paul Jensen (ice hockey) =

American ice hockey player

Personal information
- Nationality: American
- Born: May 1, 1955 (age 71) Minneapolis, Minnesota, United States

Sport
- Sport: Ice hockey

Paul Jensen (born May 1, 1955) is an American former ice hockey defenseman.

Jensen competed in the men's tournament at the 1976 Winter Olympics for the United States. He played for the Michigan Tech Huskies. He was drafted 133rd overall by the Chicago Black Hawks in the 1975 NHL Amateur Draft and 175th overall by the Houston Aeros in the 1975 WHA Amateur Draft but retired from hockey after the Olympics.
