= Jim Warden =

American ice hockey player (born 1954)

- Born: June 22, 1954 (age 71) Detroit, Michigan, U.S.A.
- Height: 6 ft 3 in (191 cm)
- Weight: 190 lb (86 kg; 13 st 8 lb)
- Position: Goaltender
- Played for: Salt Lake Golden Eagles; Phoenix Roadrunners; Oklahoma City Stars
- National team: United States
- NHL draft: 75th overall, 1974; California Golden Seals
- WHA draft: 36th overall, 1974; San Diego Mariners
- Playing career: 1975–1980; 1982–1985

James Warden (born June 22, 1954) is a former professional ice hockey goaltender.

== High school career ==
Warden attended The Blake School (Minneapolis) for his junior and senior years, where he earned all-state honors.

== College career ==
At the 1975 NCAA Division I Men's Ice Hockey Tournament, Warden was named Most Outstanding Player while also winning a national title.

== Professional career ==
=== WHA Draft ===
He was picked in the 3rd round, 36th overall, by the San Diego Mariners in the 1974 WHA Amateur Draft.

=== NHL draft ===
He was picked in the 5th round, 75th overall, by the California Golden Seals in the 1974 NHL amateur draft.

=== Minor league career ===
Warden competed in the Central Hockey League and the Atlantic Coast Hockey League.

== International career ==
Warden competed for the United States at the 1976 Winter Olympics.

Awards and achievements
| Preceded by Brad Shelstad | NCAA Tournament Most Outstanding Player; 1975 | Succeeded by Tom Vannelli |
