= George Lyle (ice hockey) =

Canadian ice hockey player (born 1953)

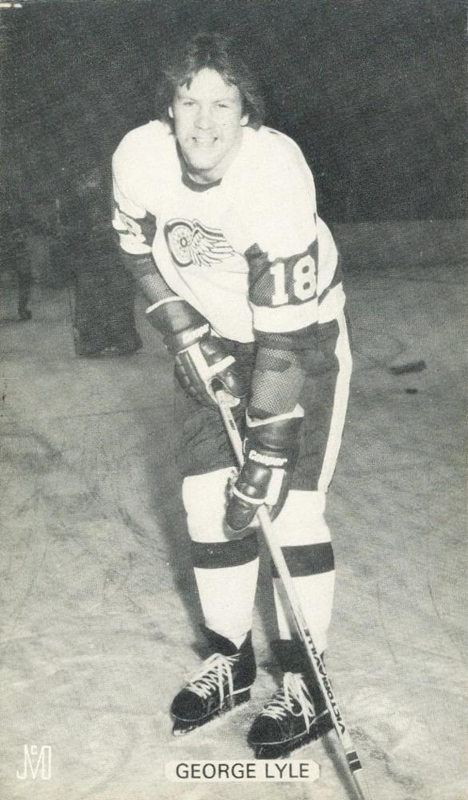
- Lyle in 1979 photo
- Born: November 24, 1953 (age 72) North Vancouver, British Columbia, Canada
- Height: 6 ft 2 in (188 cm)
- Weight: 205 lb (93 kg; 14 st 9 lb)
- Position: Left wing
- Shot: Left
- Played for: New England Whalers; Detroit Red Wings; Hartford Whalers
- NHL draft: 123rd overall, 1973; Detroit Red Wings
- Playing career: 1976–1983

George Wallace Lyle (born November 24, 1953) is a Canadian former professional ice hockey player. Between 1976 and 1983 he played 99 games in the National Hockey League with the Detroit Red Wings and Hartford Whalers, as well as 202 games in the World Hockey Association with the New England Whalers.

== Playing career ==
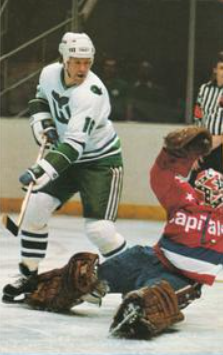
1982 card of Lyle for Hartford Whalers in action versus Washington Capitals

Lyle was selected 123rd overall in 1973 after transferring to Michigan Tech. He then spent three years at Michigan Tech where they were NCAA Champions in 1975 and runner up in both 1974 and 1976 NCAA tournament. In 1975-76 he was placed on the WCHA first all-star team and earned All-American honors after scoring 47 goals in 43 games during the 1975–76 schedule.

Lyle opted to begin his pro career with the WHA's New England Whalers in 1976–77. After scoring 39 goals for the club [team record] he was presented the Lou Kaplan Trophy as the league's top rookie. He continued to be a solid worker for another two seasons before the Detroit Red Wings reclaimed him as a part of the 1979 NHL Expansion Draft. He split the next two seasons between the NHL and the AHL's Adirondack Red Wings. In 1981 he scored 18 points in as many playoff games when he helped the Wings capture the Calder Cup.

After a slow start in 1981–82, Lyle was placed on waivers and picked up by Hartford. He averaged a point per game in 14 contests for his new club before sustaining a season ending eye injury. The veteran scorer retired in 1983 after playing 16 games for Hartford and spending the rest of his time with the Binghamton Whalers of the AHL.

== Career statistics ==
=== Regular season and playoffs ===
			Regular season					Playoffs
Season	Team	League	GP	G	A	Pts	PIM	GP	G	A	Pts	PIM
1970–71	Nor'Wes Caps	BCJHL	—	—	—	—	—	—	—	—	—	—
1972–73	Calumet-Houghton Chiefs	USHL	33	23	16	39	42	—	—	—	—	—
1973–74	Michigan Tech University	WCHA	19	9	13	22	20	—	—	—	—	—
1974–75	Michigan Tech University	WCHA	38	37	19	56	76	—	—	—	—	—
1975–76	Michigan Tech University	WCHA	43	47	41	88	42	—	—	—	—	—
1976–77	New England Whalers	WHA	75	39	33	72	62	5	1	0	1	4
1977–78	New England Whalers	WHA	68	30	24	54	74	12	2	1	3	13
1978–79	New England Whalers	WHA	59	17	18	35	54	9	3	5	8	25
1978–79	Springfield Indians	AHL	4	2	4	6	6	—	—	—	—	—
1979–80	Detroit Red Wings	NHL	27	7	4	11	2	—	—	—	—	—
1979–80	Adirondack Red Wings	AHL	33	23	9	32	40	—	—	—	—	—
1980–81	Detroit Red Wings	NHL	31	10	14	24	28	—	—	—	—	—
1980–81	Adirondack Red Wings	AHL	40	20	16	36	84	18	9	9	18	34
1981–82	Detroit Red Wings	NHL	11	1	2	3	4	—	—	—	—	—
1981–82	Hartford Whalers	NHL	14	2	12	14	9	—	—	—	—	—
1982–83	Hartford Whalers	NHL	16	4	6	10	8	—	—	—	—	—
1982–83	Binghamton Whalers	AHL	56	19	24	43	63	4	1	2	3	8
WHA totals			202	86	75	161	190	26	6	6	12	42
NHL totals			99	24	38	62	51	—	—	—	—	—

== Awards and honours ==
Award	Year
All-WCHA First Team	1975–76
