= Bill Steele (ice hockey) =

Scottish ice hockey player

- Born: 13 November 1952 Edinburgh, Scotland
- Died: March 6, 2026 (aged 73) Wauwatosa, Wisconsin
- Height: 5 ft 7 in (170 cm)
- Weight: 170 lb (77 kg; 12 st 2 lb)
- Position: Right wing
- Shot: Right
- Played for: WHA; Cincinnati Stingers; SHL; Tidewater Sharks; NAHL; Buffalo Norsemen; AHL; Hampton Gulls
- NHL draft: Undrafted
- Playing career: 1975–1978

Bill "Billy" Steele (November 13, 1952 – March 6, 2026) was a Scottish-Canadian-American former professional ice hockey player. As a youth, he played in the 1965 Quebec International Pee-Wee Hockey Tournament with a minor ice hockey team from Toronto. He was a member of the 1975 Michigan Tech NCAA National Championship team and elected to the MTU Athletics Hall of Fame on 12 October 2012. After graduation he played professionally for two seasons (1975-76 & 1976-77) with the Cincinnati Stingers of the World Hockey Association (WHA).

== Career statistics ==
=== Regular season and playoffs ===
			Regular season					Playoffs
Season	Team	League	GP	G	A	Pts	PIM	GP	G	A	Pts	PIM
1970–71	Aurora Tigers	MJBHL	Statistics Unavailable
1971–72	Michigan Tech	WCHA	32	4	6	10	12	––	––	––	––	––
1972–73	Michigan Tech	WCHA	37	11	24	35	38	––	––	––	––	––
1973–74	Michigan Tech	WCHA	35	21	26	47	32	––	––	––	––	––
1974–75	Michigan Tech	WCHA	41	29	30	59	24	––	––	––	––	––
1975–76	Tidewater Sharks	SHL	65	33	29	62	81	––	––	––	––	––
1975–76	Buffalo Norsemen	NAHL	10	7	8	15	4	4	3	0	3	14
1975–76	Cincinnati Stingers	WHA	3	2	0	2	0	––	––	––	––	––
1976–77	Cincinnati Stingers	WHA	81	9	22	31	21	2	0	0	0	0
1977–78	Hampton Gulls	AHL	35	4	9	13	18	––	––	––	––	––
WHA totals			84	11	22	33	21	2	0	0	0	0
