= Bruce Abbey =

Canadian ice hockey player

- Born: August 18, 1951 (age 74) Belmont, Ontario, Canada
- Height: 6 ft 1 in (185 cm)
- Weight: 185 lb (84 kg; 13 st 3 lb)
- Position: Defence
- Shot: Right
- Played for: WHA; Cincinnati Stingers
- NHL draft: 91st overall, 1971; Minnesota North Stars
- Playing career: 1975–1981

Bruce Abbey (born August 18, 1951) is a Canadian former professional ice hockey defenceman who spent his junior hockey career from 1969 to 1971 with the Peterborough Petes of the Ontario Major Junior Hockey League which later became the OHL (Ontario Hockey League) in 1980. He also played 17 games in the World Hockey Association (WHA) with the Cincinnati Stingers during the 1975–76 WHA season.

== Career statistics ==
=== Regular season and playoffs ===
			Regular season					Playoffs
Season	Team	League	GP	G	A	Pts	PIM	GP	G	A	Pts	PIM
1969–70	Peterborough Petes	OHA	52	1	14	15	80	––	––	––	––	––
1970–71	Peterborough Petes	OHA	55	1	10	11	70	––	––	––	––	––
1971–72	Michigan Tech	WCHA	23	2	7	9	49	––	––	––	––	––
1972–73	Michigan Tech	WCHA	32	0	9	9	60	––	––	––	––	––
1973–74	Michigan Tech	WCHA	37	1	21	22	52	––	––	––	––	––
1974–75	Michigan Tech	WCHA	36	3	14	17	83	––	––	––	––	––
1975–76	Tucson Mavericks	CHL	20	4	2	6	15	––	––	––	––	––
1975–76	Cincinnati Stingers	WHA	17	1	0	1	12	––	––	––	––	––
1975–76	Hampton Gulls	SHL	18	2	10	12	40	––	––	––	––	––
1976–77	Bjorkloven IF	SEL	25	3	1	4	34	––	––	––	––	––
1980–81	Landsberg EV	2.GBun	26	8	10	18	43	––	––	––	––	––
WHA totals			17	1	0	1	12	—	—	—	—	—
