= 1973–74 Minnesota Golden Gophers men's ice hockey season =

National champion Big Ten, co-champion WCHA Tournament, co-champion NCAA tournament, champion
- Conference: 2nd WCHA; 1st (tied) Big Ten
- Home ice: Williams Arena

Record
- Overall: 22–11–6
- Conference: 14–9–5
- Home: 11–4–3
- Road: 8–7–3
- Neutral: 3–0–0

Coaches and captains
- Head coach: Herb Brooks
- Captain: Brad Shelstad
- Alternate captain(s): John Matschke; John Perpich; Cal Cossalter

The 1973–74 Minnesota Golden Gophers men's ice hockey season was the 53rd season of play for the program, the 16th in the Big Ten and 15th in the WCHA. The Golden Gophers represented the University of Minnesota and were coached by Herb Brooks in his 2nd season. The Golden Gophers defeated Michigan Tech 4–2 in the NCAA championship game to win the program's first national championship.

== Season ==
=== Stumbling Out of the Gate ===
After a poor year in his first season as head coach, hopes were high for Herb Brooks in year two. In 1973 the NCAA had finally cracked down on teams importing over-aged players from Canada and had gone so far as to vacate Denver's participation in the national tournament. While the majority of Canadian players who were already on NCAA teams were grandfathered into the new policy and allowed to play, no incoming players were permitted if they had played in any top-tier Canadian Junior League. Because Minnesota's team had been almost exclusively made up of native players for the past two decades the result of the renewed enforcement gave the Golden Gophers an advantage; because they had been actively recruiting players from Minnesota they were the primary destination for the best players in the state. However, because many NCAA teams were still made up of a majority of Canadians this advantage would not yet be realized.

Regardless of the recruiting practices, Minnesota went into the season looking to recover from a losing season and returned many players from the previous year. Senior netminder Brad Shelstad was named team captain and led the Golden Gophers against an improving Minnesota–Duluth squad in their season opener on the road. Minnesota dropped the contest 3–4 and then headed home to host defending national champion Wisconsin and dropped to 0–3 on the season after losing both games. The Gophers then welcomed another Big Ten rival in Michigan and ended the weekend with an 0–4–1 record.

=== Recovery ===
This was a disaster for the Gophers, who were looking for more out of the young coach, but the next team up for Minnesota was North Dakota, who were in the midst of their second worst season since World War II. The Golden Gophers dominated UND, outscoring the Fighting Sioux 18–6 in the two games. The following weekend Minnesota hit the road and played Michigan State. While the series was closer in score Minnesota once again won both games and pulled their record back to even. The golden Gophers returned home and played their first non-conference games of the season, taking another set of close matches against rising Saint Louis. After a week off Minnesota–Duluth arrived in Minneapolis and the Gophers were able to just finish ahead of the Bulldogs, tying the first game before winning the second.

At the end of December Minnesota played in the St. Louis Holiday Tournament. After opening with a win over Harvard, Minnesota faced the Billikens for the third time that season who were able to repay the Gophers with their 6–2 victory, leaving Minnesota as the runner-up. A day after the final Minnesota played the Czech National Team and through they lost the game 1–7 the contest was an exhibition match and did not count towards their record.

=== .500 Hockey ===
Minnesota began the second half of their regular season at North Dakota, taking both games to improve to 10–5–2 in the WCHA despite being held to two goals in both games. The Gophers continued their road swing against Minnesota–Duluth and lost both games, a trend that would mostly continue for the next month. After splitting two consecutive series Minnesota faced Wisconsin in mid-February with the Big Ten championship up for grabs. Despite the Gophers' bad start Wisconsin had faltered down the stretch and the two were now tied for the lead. The teams ended up tying both games to finish with identical 5–4–3 records.

With only WCHA games left on their schedule Minnesota had plenty of opportunity to finish atop the conference standings but they would need help. On February 14, Minnesota was behind Denver and Michigan Tech with Wisconsin trailing by one point. The Gophers, however, had an advantage in that they still had six conference games to play while Wisconsin had four and Denver had two. Michigan Tech was far in the lead with a 15–5–2 record and six WCHA games to play, but because the conference tournament would crown two co-champions Minnesota could ensure home ice so long as they finished in the top two spots.

Minnesota's played two series against bottom-feeding teams in Notre Dame and Colorado College, winning three games and tying the other. The seven points put Minnesota firmly in the 2nd spot with 33 points while Michigan Tech being 5 points ahead ensured the Huskies with the Conference title. because the two teams could not meet in the WCHA tournament the regular season finale between the two would be the only meeting other than possibly for the national championship. With both team only playing for pride Michigan Tech used home ice to their advantage and easily defeated the Gophers, outscoring their opponents by 3 goals in each game. The poor end to the regular season, however would not put a damper on Minnesota's playoff hopes as they were set up to host each WCHA playoff round they could reach.

=== WCHA Tournament ===
Minnesota met Michigan in the opening round and got off to a good start in the first game, capturing the match 5–1. with a 4-goal advantage for the two-game aggregate series Minnesota had a comfortable lead but that did not stop them from winning the second contest, albeit with a much closer score. In the second round Minnesota welcomed Denver to Minneapolis. The Gopher's victory against the Pioneers in the regular season was their first since 1958 and Minnesota had to beat Denver once again if they wanted to make the NCAA tournament. The two heated rivals fought to a 3–3 tie in the first game leading to a decisive second game where Brad Shelstad held Denver to a single goal and gave Minnesota its third WCHA Tournament championship (shared with Michigan Tech).

=== NCAA tournament ===
The NCAA had altered its classification system in the summer of 1973 making the 1974 tournament the first official Division I championship. The renaming, however, meant nothing as far as any of the teams were concerned. The format and selection remained unchanged and, with their #2 western seed assured, Minnesota faced ECAC champion Boston University. The Terriers had knocked Minnesota out in its last tournament appearance but this time the Gophers were up for the challenge and eked out a narrow 5–4 win. The following night Michigan Tech won their game against Harvard in overtime to match the two WCHA teams in the final. While the Huskies had easily handles Minnesota two weeks earlier, the team had started to show cracks, tying once against the weak Notre Dame team and losing one of their games to Michigan State in the WCHA tournament. Even with the experienced John MacInnes at the helm Michigan Tech wasn't playing particularly well and Minnesota took advantage early. The Gophers outshot MTU 17–11 in the opening frame, with John Sheridan scoring the game's first goal in the 16th minute. John Perpich added a second marker early in the second but the two-goal lead seemed to wake up the Huskies who proved a much stiffer test in the middle period. George Lyle cut the lead in half and sent the match into the third with Minnesota clinging to a narrow margin. The Huskies, however, fell apart in the last 20 minutes, allowing Minnesota to outshoot them 14–3 and score twice more to gain a three-goal edge. High-scoring sophomore Mike Zuke netted MTU's second goal of the game but it came with less than a minute remaining and Minnesota won its first National Title.

Team Captain Brad Shelstad was named as the Tournament MOP and found himself on the All-Tournament Team along with teammates Les Auge and Mike Polich. Minnesota had none of its players make the AHCA All-American West Team while Shelstad was the only member of the Gophers to make an All-WCHA Team, earning first-team honors.

Minnesota had not been expected to compete for a national championship and even after the win Pat Phippen was at a loss for how to explain their surprise title. This was due in part to Minnesota being the first team since Boston College in 1949 to win a championship with a team made up of primarily American players and were one Eric Lockwood game away from playing an entire season with only native Minnesotans. The All-American team was one of the most important wins for USA Hockey as it demonstrated that American players could compete with Canadians and gave professional teams one more reason why they should give US players a chance. The win by Minnesota was felt in the 1974 NHL amateur draft when Minnesota went from have no players taken in either of the previous two years to eight alumni selected in 1974.

== Standings ==
1973–74 Western Collegiate Hockey Association standings
	Conference							Overall					
	GP	W	L	T	PTS	GF	GA	GP	W	L	T	GF	GA
Michigan Tech†*	28	20	6	2	42	155	95	40	28	9	3	218	135
Minnesota*	28	14	9	5	33	125	100	39	22	11	6	171	143
Denver	28	15	11	2	32	126	122	38	22	13	3	171	156
Michigan State	28	15	12	1	31	150	140	38	23	14	1	207	177
Wisconsin	28	12	11	5	29	124	105	36	18	13	5	170	141
Minnesota-Duluth	28	13	14	1	27	113	126	38	21	16	1	167	155
Michigan	28	12	15	1	25	107	131	36	18	17	1	147	162
Notre Dame	28	11	16	1	23	125	121	36	14	20	2	159	154
Colorado College	28	10	16	2	22	120	138	32	13	17	2	155	157
North Dakota	28	8	20	0	16	80	147	34	10	23	1	103	169
Championship: Michigan Tech, Minnesota † indicates conference regular season champion * indicates conference tournament champion

1973–74 Big Ten standings
	Conference							Overall					
	GP	W	L	T	PTS	GF	GA	GP	W	L	T	GF	GA
Wisconsin†	12	5	4	3	13	55	45	36	18	13	5	170	141
Minnesota†	12	5	4	3	13	50	47	39	22	11	6	171	143
Michigan State	12	5	6	1	11	61	63	38	23	14	1	207	177
Michigan	12	5	6	1	11	47	59	36	18	17	1	147	162
† indicates conference regular season champion

== Schedule ==
Date	Opponent^{#}	Rank^{#}	Site	Result	Record
Regular season
October 27	at Minnesota–Duluth*		Duluth Arena Auditorium • Duluth, Minnesota	L 3–4	0–1
November 2	vs. Wisconsin		Williams Arena • Minneapolis, Minnesota	L 2–3	0–2 (0–1 / 0–1)
November 3	vs. Wisconsin		Williams Arena • Minneapolis, Minnesota	L 2–8	0–3 (0–2 / 0–2)
November 9	vs. Michigan		Williams Arena • Minneapolis, Minnesota	T 4–4 ^{OT}	0–3–1 (0–2–1 / 0–2–1)
November 10	vs. Michigan		Williams Arena • Minneapolis, Minnesota	L 3–4	0–4–1 (0–3–1 / 0–3–1)
November 16	vs. North Dakota		Williams Arena • Minneapolis, Minnesota	W 7–3	1–4–1 (1–3–1 / 0–3–1)
November 17	vs. North Dakota		Williams Arena • Minneapolis, Minnesota	W 11–3	2–4–1 (2–3–1 / 0–3–1)
November 23	at Michigan State		Demonstration Hall • East Lansing, Michigan	W 6–3	3–4–1 (3–3–1 / 1–3–1)
November 24	at Michigan State		Demonstration Hall • East Lansing, Michigan	W 4–3	4–4–1 (4–3–1 / 2–3–1)
November 30	vs. Saint Louis*		Williams Arena • Minneapolis, Minnesota	W 3–2	5–4–1 (4–3–1 / 2–3–1)
December 1	vs. Saint Louis*		Williams Arena • Minneapolis, Minnesota	W 7–5	6–4–1 (4–3–1 / 2–3–1)
December 14	vs. Minnesota–Duluth		Williams Arena • Minneapolis, Minnesota	T 3–3 ^{OT}	6–4–2 (4–3–2 / 2–3–1)
December 15	vs. Minnesota–Duluth		Williams Arena • Minneapolis, Minnesota	W 6–5	7–4–2 (5–3–2 / 2–3–1)
St. Louis Holiday Tournament
December 27	vs. Harvard*		St. Louis Arena • St. Louis, Missouri (St. Louis Holiday Tournament)	W 6–3	8–4–2 (5–3–2 / 2–3–1)
December 28	at Saint Louis*		St. Louis Arena • St. Louis, Missouri (St. Louis Holiday Tournament)	L 2–6	8–5–2 (5–3–2 / 2–3–1)
December 29	vs. Czech National Team*		Williams Arena • Minneapolis, Minnesota (Exhibition)	L 1–7	8–5–2 (5–3–2 / 2–3–1)
January 4	at North Dakota		Winter Sports Center • Grand Forks, North Dakota	W 2–1	9–5–2 (6–3–2 / 2–3–1)
January 5	at North Dakota		Winter Sports Center • Grand Forks, North Dakota	W 2–1	10–5–2 (7–3–2 / 2–3–1)
January 11	at Minnesota–Duluth		Duluth Arena Auditorium • Duluth, Minnesota	L 3–4	10–6–2 (7–4–2 / 2–3–1)
January 12	at Minnesota–Duluth		Duluth Arena Auditorium • Duluth, Minnesota	L 2–5	10–7–2 (7–5–2 / 2–3–1)
January 18	vs. Michigan State		Williams Arena • Minneapolis, Minnesota	W 9–4	11–7–2 (8–5–2 / 3–3–1)
January 19	vs. Michigan State		Williams Arena • Minneapolis, Minnesota	W 6–3	12–7–2 (9–5–2 / 4–3–1)
January 25	at Michigan		Yost Ice Arena • Ann Arbor, Michigan	W 4–2	13–7–2 (10–5–2 / 5–3–1)
January 26	at Michigan		Yost Ice Arena • Ann Arbor, Michigan	L 3–6	13–8–2 (10–6–2 / 5–4–1)
February 1	vs. Denver		Williams Arena • Minneapolis, Minnesota	L 5–6	13–9–2 (10–7–2 / 5–4–1)
February 2	vs. Denver		Williams Arena • Minneapolis, Minnesota	W 10–2	14–9–2 (11–7–2 / 5–4–1)
February 8	at Wisconsin		Dane County Coliseum • Madison, Wisconsin	T 3–3 ^{OT}	14–9–3 (11–7–3 / 5–4–2)
February 9	at Wisconsin		Dane County Coliseum • Madison, Wisconsin	T 4–4 ^{OT}	14–9–4 (11–7–4 / 5–4–3)
February 15	vs. Notre Dame		Athletic & Convocation Center • Notre Dame, Indiana	W 7–2	15–9–4 (12–7–4 / 5–4–3)
February 16	vs. Notre Dame		Athletic & Convocation Center • Notre Dame, Indiana	W 6–3	16–9–4 (13–7–4 / 5–4–3)
February 22	at Colorado College		Broadmoor World Arena • Colorado Springs, Colorado	W 2–1	17–9–4 (14–7–4 / 5–4–2)
February 23	at Colorado College		Broadmoor World Arena • Colorado Springs, Colorado	T 6–6 ^{OT}	17–9–5 (14–7–5 / 5–4–3)
March 1	at Michigan Tech		Student Ice Arena • Houghton, Michigan	L 2–5	17–10–5 (14–8–5 / 5–4–2)
March 2	at Michigan Tech		Student Ice Arena • Houghton, Michigan	L 1–4	17–11–5 (14–9–5 / 5–4–3)
WCHA Tournament
March 5	vs. Michigan*		Williams Arena • Minneapolis, Minnesota (WCHA First Round Game 1)	W 5–1	18–11–5 (14–9–5 / 5–4–3)
March 6	vs. Michigan*		Williams Arena • Minneapolis, Minnesota (WCHA First Round Game 2)	W 5–4	19–11–5 (14–9–5 / 5–4–3)
Minnesota Wins Series 10-5
March 9	vs. Denver*		Williams Arena • Minneapolis, Minnesota (WCHA Second Round Game 1)	T 3–3 ^{OT}	19–11–6 (14–9–5 / 5–4–3)
March 10	vs. Denver*		Williams Arena • Minneapolis, Minnesota (WCHA Second Round Game 2)	W 2–1	20–11–6 (14–9–5 / 5–4–3)
Minnesota Wins Series 5-4
NCAA tournament
March 14	vs. Boston University*		Boston Garden • Boston, Massachusetts (National Semifinal)	W 5–4	21–11–6 (14–9–5 / 5–4–3)
March 15	vs. Michigan Tech*		Boston Garden • Boston, Massachusetts (National championship)	W 4–2	22–11–6 (14–9–5 / 5–4–3)
*Non-conference game. ^{#}Rankings from USCHO.com Poll. Source:

== Roster and scoring statistics ==
No.	Player	Year	Position	Hometown	S/P/C	Games	Goals	Assists	Points	PIM
7	Mike Polich	Junior	C	Hibbing, MN	(Minnesota)	40	19	33	52	36
20	John Harris	Senior	C	Roseau, MN	(Minnesota)	39	17	27	44	4
24	Buzz Schneider	Sophomore	LW	Babbitt, MN	(Minnesota)	40	24	15	39	38
9	John Sheridan	Freshman	C	Minneapolis, MN	(Minnesota)	38	24	14	38	42
14	John Matschke	Senior	F	White Bear Lake, MN	(Minnesota)	37	15	23	38	20
19	Rob Harris	Junior	F	Roseau, MN	(Minnesota)	40	20	17	37	22
6	Les Auge	Junior	D	Saint Paul, MN	(Minnesota)	40	8	28	36	58
11	Pat Phippen	Freshman	LW	Roseville, MN	(Minnesota)	40	7	23	30	16
	Calvin Cossalter	Junior	C	Eveleth, MN	(Minnesota)	39	10	19	29	18
10	Warren Miller	Sophomore	F	South Saint Paul, MN	(Minnesota)	40	11	16	27	34
8	Dick Spannbauer	Sophomore	D	Saint Paul, MN	(Minnesota)	40	2	16	18	90
2	Brad Morrow	Sophomore	D	Anoka, MN	(Minnesota)	40	3	9	12	44
4	John Perpich	Senior	D	Hibbing, MN	(Minnesota)	40	2	9	11	26
5	Doug Falls	Junior	D	Minneapolis, MN	(Minnesota)	37	1	9	10	28
23	Thomas Dahlheim	Junior	RW	Bloomington, MN	(Minnesota)	39	3	6	9	2
3	Joe Micheletti	Freshman	D / C	Hibbing, MN	(Minnesota)	21	2	5	7	10
12	Bruce Carlson	Senior	LW	Edina, MN	(Minnesota)	40	2	5	7	10
15	Tom Vannelli	Freshman	C	Saint Paul, MN	(Minnesota)	17	0	3	3	4
21	Tim Carlson	Junior	C	Edina, MN	(Minnesota)	11	1	0	1	2
22	Mike Phippen	Freshman	F	Roseville, MN	(Minnesota)	2	0	0	0	0
	Eric Lockwood	Freshman	G	Regina, SK	(Saskatchewan)	1	0	0	0	0
30	Bill Moen	Freshman	G	Proctor, MN	(Minnesota)	6	0	0	0	0
1	Brad Shelstad	Senior	G	Minneapolis, MN	(Minnesota)	34	0	0	0	0
Total										

== Goaltending statistics ==
No.	Player	Games	Minutes	Wins	Losses	Ties	Goals against	Saves	Shut outs	SV %	GAA
30	Brad Shelstad	34	2148				111	1075	0	.906	3.10
1	Bill Moen	6	357				25	152	0	.859	4.20
30	Eric Lockwood	1	60				6	26	0	.813	6.00
Total		40		22	11	6	143		0		

== 1974 championship game ==
=== (W1) Michigan Tech vs. (W2) Minnesota ===
March 16	Michigan Tech	2 – 4	Minnesota	Boston Garden

Scoring summary
Period	Team	Goal	Assist(s)	Time	Score
1st	MIN	John Sheridan	Miller, Phippen	15:26	1–0 MIN
2nd	MIN	John Perpich	Morrow and Polich	23:24	2–0 MIN
2nd	MTU	George Lyle	D'Alvise	33:40	2–1 MIN
3rd	MIN	Robby Harris – GW	Matschke	44:45	3–1 MIN
3rd	MIN	Pat Phippen	Sheridan	57:17	4–1 MIN
3rd	MTU	Mike Zuke	Steele and Stamler	59:12	4–2 MIN

Shots by period
Team	1	2	3	T
Minnesota	17	8	14	39
Michigan Tech	11	10	3	24

Goaltenders
Team	Name	Saves	Goals against	Time on ice
MIN	Brad Shelstad	22	2	
MTU	Rick Quance	35	4	

== Players drafted into the NHL/WHA ==
=== 1974 NHL amateur draft ===
= Did not play in the NHL

Round	Pick	Player	NHL team
3	46	Dick Spannbauer	Atlanta Flames
6	93	Tom Sundberg ‡	California Golden Seals
6	96	John Sheridan	Minnesota North Stars
6	98	Buzz Schneider	Pittsburgh Penguins
6	100	Bill Moen	Atlanta Flames
7	123	Joe Micheletti	Montreal Canadiens
13	211	Brad Morrow	Philadelphia Flyers
21	241	Warren Miller	New York Rangers

=== 1974 WHA Amateur Draft ===
= Did not play in the WHA

Round	Pick	Player	WHA Team
1	15	Dick Spannbauer	Houston Aeros
5	67	Paul Holmgren †	Edmonton Oilers
5	73	Buzz Schneider	Minnesota Fighting Saints
7	97	Tom Sundberg ‡	Edmonton Oilers
8	106	Joe Micheletti	Cincinnati Stingers
9	121	John Sheridan	Indianapolis Racers
11	161	Warren Miller	New England Whalers
13	188	Robin Larson †	Minnesota Fighting Saints
14	201	Joe Baker †	Minnesota Fighting Saints
15	212	Tony Dorn †	Minnesota Fighting Saints
16	220	Reed Larson †	Minnesota Fighting Saints

† Incoming Freshman.
‡ Sundberg played for Minnesota in 1972–73.
