= 1974 NCAA Division I men's ice hockey tournament =

- Teams: 4
- Finals site: Boston Garden, Boston, Massachusetts
- Champions: Minnesota Golden Gophers (1st title)
- Runner-up: Michigan Tech Huskies (5th title game)
- Semifinalists: Boston University Terriers (9th Frozen Four); Harvard Crimson (6th Frozen Four)
- Winning coach: Herb Brooks (1st title)
- MOP: Brad Shelstad (Minnesota)
- Attendance: 22,919

The 1974 NCAA Division I men's ice hockey tournament was the culmination of the 1973–74 NCAA Division I men's ice hockey season, the 27th such tournament in NCAA history. It was held between March 14 and 16, 1974, and concluded with Minnesota defeating Michigan Tech 4–2. All games were played at the Boston Garden in Boston, Massachusetts.

This is the last tournament to not have a team returning from the previous season's bracket. (as of 2016)

== Qualifying teams ==
Four teams qualified for the tournament, two each from the eastern and western regions. The ECAC tournament champion and the two WCHA tournament co-champions received automatic bids into the tournament. An at-large bid was offered to a second eastern team based upon both their ECAC tournament finish as well as their regular season record.

East							West						
Seed	School	Conference	Record	Berth type	Appearance	Last bid	Seed	School	Conference	Record	Berth type	Appearance	Last bid
1	Boston University	ECAC Hockey	22–7–0	Tournament champion	9th	1972	1	Michigan Tech	WCHA	27–8–3	Tournament co-champion	7th	1970
2	Harvard	ECAC Hockey	17–9–1	At-Large	6th	1971	2	Minnesota	WCHA	20–11–6	Tournament co-champion	5th	1971

== Format ==
The ECAC champion was seeded as the top eastern team while the WCHA co-champion with the better regular season record was given the top western seed. The second eastern seed was slotted to play the top western seed and vice versa. All games were played at the Boston Garden. All matches were Single-game eliminations with the semifinal winners advancing to the national championship game and the losers playing in a consolation game.

== Bracket ==
Semifinals; March 14–15
E1	Boston University	4
W2	Minnesota	5
W1	Michigan Tech	6*
E2	Harvard	5

National championship March 16
W2	Minnesota	4
W1	Michigan Tech	2
Third Place Game
E1	Boston University	7
E2	Harvard	5

Note: * denotes overtime period(s)

== Results ==
=== Semifinals ===
March 14, 1974; 7:30 pm	(E1) Boston University	4–5 (0–1, 1–2, 3–2)	(W2) Minnesota	Boston Garden; Attendance: 6,232

Game reference

Ed Walsh
Goalies
Brad Shelstad

	0 – 1	19:19 – PP – John Harris (Matschke, Auge)
	0 – 2	22:37 – Warren Miller (Sheridan, Morrow)
	0 – 3	25:14 – John Matschke (J. Harris, Spannbauer)
(Robbins, Stanfield) Peter Marzo – 30:35	1 – 3
(Stanfield, P. Brown) Peter Marzo – PP – 42:43	2 – 3
	2 – 4	44:50 – John Harris (R. Harris, Micheletti)
(Brown, Marzo) Bill Robbins – 47:20	3 – 4
(Eruzione, Stanfield) Rick Meagher – 50:36	4 – 4
	4 – 5	59:47 – GW SH – Mike Polich (Falls)

8 min
Penalties
10 min
44
Shots
52

March 15, 1974; 7:30 pm	(W1) Michigan Tech	6–5 (OT) (2–3, 1–1, 2–1, 1–0)	(E2) Harvard	Boston Garden; Attendance: 6,703

Game reference

Jim Warden
Goalies
Jim Murray

	0 – 1	04:03 – Dan Bolduc (Roth)
	0 – 2	06:26 – Jim McMahon (unassisted)
	0 – 3	08:21 – PP – Jim McMahon (Roth, Goodenow)
(Lyle, Abbey) Bob D'Alvise – 13:11	1 – 3
(Nahrgang, Zuke) Bill Steele – PP – 16:16	2 – 3
(Zuke, P. Jensen) Bruce Abbey – 24:43	3 – 3
	3 – 4	33:10 – PP – Jim McMahon (Roth, Dagdigian)
	3 – 5	41:27 – Jim Thomas (Hogan)
(Abbey) Lorne Stamler – 44:14	4 – 5
(Vorlicek, Abbey) Steve Jensen – 54:23	5 – 5
(Zuke, Stamler) Bill Steele – GW – 60:31	6 – 5

14 min
Penalties
8 min
36
Shots
52

=== Consolation Game ===
March 16, 1974; 2:30 pm	(E1) Boston University	7–5 (1–1, 2–1, 4–3)	(E2) Harvard	Boston Garden

Game reference

(out 20:00) Ed Walsh
(in 20:00, out 40:00) Joe Robillard
(in 40:00) Pat Devlin
Goalies
John Aiken

	0 – 1	03:37 – Paul Haley (unknown)
(Bannerman) Jim Glover – 10:52	1 – 1
(Bishop) Ken Kuzyk – 22:23	2 – 1
	2 – 2	23:57 – Kevin Carr (unknown)
(unknown) Bill Buckton – 24:51	3 – 2
	3 – 3	42:12 – Kevin Carr (unknown)
	3 – 4	42:54 – Kevin Carr (Byrd)
	3 – 5	49:20 – Phelps Swift (unknown)
(unknown) Bill Burlington – 49:43	4 – 5
(unknown) Bill Robbins – 52:56	5 – 5
(Stanfield) Bill Robbins – GW – 58:11	6 – 5
(unknown) Bill Buckton – EN – 59:58	7 – 5

49
Shots
29

=== National Championship ===
March 16, 1974; 7:30 pm	(W1) Michigan Tech	2–4 (0–1, 1–1, 1–2)	(W2) Minnesota	Boston Garden; Attendance: 7,132

Referees: Gordie Lee; Medo Martinello

Scoring summary
Period	Team	Goal	Assist(s)	Time	Score
1st	MIN	John Sheridan	Miller, Phippen	15:26	1–0 MIN
2nd	MIN	John Perpich	Morrow and Polich	23:24	2–0 MIN
2nd	MTU	George Lyle	D'Alvise	33:40	2–1 MIN
3rd	MIN	Robby Harris – GW	Matschke	44:45	3–1 MIN
3rd	MIN	Pat Phippen	Sheridan	57:17	4–1 MIN
3rd	MTU	Mike Zuke	Steele and Stamler	59:12	4–2 MIN
Penalty summary
Period	Team	Player	Penalty	Time	PIM
1st	MTU	Mike Usitalo		11:31	2:00
2nd	MTU	Bob D'Alvise		21:34	2:00
2nd	MTU	George Lyle		21:34	2:00
2nd	MIN	Joe Micheletti		21:34	2:00
2nd	MIN	Dick Spannbauer		21:34	2:00
2nd	MTU	Bruce Abbey		25:14	2:00
2nd	MTU	Bob Lorimer		26:09	2:00
2nd	MIN	Mike Polich		26:09	2:00
2nd	MTU	Graham Wise		30:11	2:00
2nd	MTU	George Lyle		33:53	2:00
2nd	MIN	Doug Falls		33:53	2:00
2nd	MTU	Jim Nahrgang		34:10	2:00
3rd	MTU	Elie Vorlicek		46:02	2:00

Shots by period
Team	1	2	3	T
Minnesota	17	8	14	39
Michigan Tech	11	10	3	24

Goaltenders
Team	Name	Saves	Goals against	Time on ice
MIN	Brad Shelstad	22	2	
MTU	Rick Quance	35	4	

== All-Tournament team ==
- G: Brad Shelstad* (Minnesota)
- D: Les Auge (Minnesota)
- D: Jim Nahrgang (Michigan Tech)
- F: Steve Jensen (Michigan Tech)
- F: Jim McMahon (Harvard)
- F: Mike Polich (Minnesota)

* Most Outstanding Player(s)
