= Randy Roth (ice hockey) =

Canadian ice hockey player

- Born: June 17, 1952 (age 74) Woodstock, Ontario, Canada
- Height: 5 ft 8 in (173 cm)
- Weight: 165 lb (75 kg; 11 st 11 lb)
- Position: Center
- Played for: Harvard
- Playing career: 1972–1975

Randall Roth is a Canadian retired ice hockey center who was a two-time All-American for Harvard.

== Career ==
Roth came to Harvard University in 1971 and played on the freshman team before joining the varsity hockey club as a sophomore. In each of his three year with the program, Roth was the team's leading scorer, but it was during his junior season that he became a Crimson legend. In that season's Beanpot tournament, Roth scored the overtime goal in the championship game, winning the program's first title in six years. He continued to play well throughout the season and helped the Crimson finish second in both the regular season and the ECAC tournament. He was named ECAC Player of the Year and to the All-American team. Roth helped Harvard score 10 goals in the NCAA Tournament but the team still managed to lose both of their games.

For his senior season, Roth was named team captain and led Harvard to the top of the ECAC standings. Harvard lost just once in 20 conference games and ran through the first two round of the ECAC tournament but the team was stymied again in the title game. Harvard made a second consecutive trip to the NCAA Tournament and Roth helped the team record 9 goals in 2 games, but the defense was rather porous, allowing 16 scored and Harvard again finished in 4th place.

After graduating, Roth played two seasons of senior hockey before ending his career. When he graduated, Roth was Harvard 4th all-time leading scorer and his exploits were remembered. He was inducted into the Harvard Athletic Hall of Fame in 1997 and the Beanpot Hall of Fame in 2000.

== Career statistics ==
=== Regular season and playoffs ===
			Regular Season					Playoffs
Season	Team	League	GP	G	A	Pts	PIM	GP	G	A	Pts	PIM
1969–70	Stratford Warriors	WOJHL	—	—	—	—	—	—	—	—	—	—
1972–73	Harvard	ECAC Hockey	22	12	27	39	22	—	—	—	—	—
1973–74	Harvard	ECAC Hockey	29	21	32	53	12	—	—	—	—	—
1974–75	Harvard	ECAC Hockey	29	21	29	50	14	—	—	—	—	—
1975–76	Lucan-Ilderton Jets	CSAHL	—	—	—	—	—	—	—	—	—	—
1976–77	Lucan-Ilderton Jets	CSAHL	—	—	—	—	—	—	—	—	—	—
NCAA Totals			80	53	88	141	48	—	—	—	—	—

== Awards and honors ==
Award	Year
All-ECAC Hockey First Team	1973–74
AHCA East All-American	1973–74
All-ECAC Hockey Second Team	1974–75
AHCA East All-American	1974–75

Awards and achievements
Preceded by Tom Mellor	ECAC Hockey Player of the Year; 1973–74	Succeeded by Ron Wilson
