= Brad Shelstad =

American ice hockey player

- Born: September 14, 1952 (age 73) Minneapolis, Minnesota, USA
- Height: 6 ft 3 in (191 cm)
- Weight: 194 lb (88 kg; 13 st 12 lb)
- Position: Goaltender
- Played for: Minnesota Golden Gophers; Fort Wayne Komets
- NHL draft: Undrafted
- Playing career: 1970–1976

Brad Shelstad is a retired American ice hockey player. He captained Minnesota to its first National Title in 1974 winning the Tournament MOP in the process.

== Career ==
Shelstad joined the Minnesota Golden Gophers after winning the 1970 state championship for Southwest HS. He played in 15 games during his freshman year, sharing goaltending duties with fellow freshman Dennis Erickson, but was relegated to a backup role by the end of the season. Minnesota would reach the NCAA Championship game despite holding a losing record (the only team to do so as of 2019). The following year saw Shelstad's workload reduced to just six appearances but, critically, after a 1–7 start head coach Glen Sonmor resigned and was replaced by Ken Yackel for the remainder of the year. Erickson would depart after the season leaving Shelstad as the most senior goaltender on the team.

Incoming head coach Herb Brooks put his trust in Shelstad, allowing the junior netminder to take the lead in net and play in 23 games. While the team performed poorly, finishing a game under .500, Shelstad improved immensely, posting a goals against average of 3.30 and a save percentage of .906, finishing in the top ten among NCAA goalies. Shelstad was named as team captain in 1973–74, the last Minnesota goaltender to have that honor, and continued to improve his game. After a slow start Shelstad got the gophers to produce their first winning season since 1970 and again finished among the best goaltenders in the nation. Shelstad played in 34 games in his final year, a new program record (since broken) and led the Gophers back to the NCAA tournament. Despite not being considered a threat for the national championship, Minnesota beat Boston University in the semifinal before Shelstad stifled the nation's top offense in Michigan Tech to give Minnesota its first national title. Shelstad was named as the most outstanding player of the tournament.

After graduating Shelstad played briefly for both the US national team and the Fort Wayne Komets before retiring as a player. Shelstad turned to coaching soon after and became the head coach for New Prague High School in 1979 then moved to Wadena-Deer Creek Senior High School in 1985, coaching the Wolverines for another 13 seasons. Shelstad was inducted into the Minnesota Hockey Coaches Hall of Fame in 2006 and was ranked by mnhockeyhub.com as the 26th best high school player in state history.

== Awards and honors ==
| Award | Year |
|---|---|
| All-WCHA First Team | 1973–74 |
| All-NCAA All-Tournament First Team | 1974 |

Awards and achievements
| Preceded by Dean Talafous | NCAA Tournament Most Outstanding Player; 1974 | Succeeded by Jim Warden |
