= Deer Creek High School =

Deer Creek High School may refer to:

- Deer Creek High School — a high school in Deer Creek, Illinois, that merged into Dee-Mack High School
- Deer Creek High School (Edmond, Oklahoma) — a school near Edmond and Oklahoma City in Oklahoma County, Oklahoma, and in the Deer Creek Public Schools; teams are the Antlers
- Deer Creek-Lamont High School, a school in Lamont, Grant County, Oklahoma, and the Deer Creek-Lamont Public Schools; teams are the Eagles
- Wadena-Deer Creek Senior High School, a school in Wadena, Minnesota and the Wadena-Deer Creek School District; teams are the Wolverines
