= Bill Burlington =

Bill Burlington may refer to:

- William Cavendish, Earl of Burlington, British aristocrat and photographer
- Bill Burlington (ice hockey), Canadian ice hockey center
