= Mike Polich =

American ice hockey player (born 1952)

- Born: December 19, 1952 (age 72) Hibbing, Minnesota, U.S.
- Height: 5 ft 8 in (173 cm)
- Weight: 170 lb (77 kg; 12 st 2 lb)
- Position: Center
- Shot: Left
- Played for: Montreal Canadiens; Minnesota North Stars
- National team: United States
- NHL draft: Undrafted
- Playing career: 1975–1981

Michael John Polich (born December 19, 1952) is an American former professional ice hockey player who played 226 games in the National Hockey League from 1977 to 1981. He won the Stanley Cup in 1977 with the Montreal Canadiens and played in the 1981 Stanley Cup Finals with the Minnesota North Stars.

== Playing career ==
Polich was a college hockey star for the University of Minnesota and also played for Team USA at the 1974 and 1975 Ice Hockey World Championship tournaments before signing a free agent contract with the Montreal Canadiens of the NHL in 1975. Polich spent most of the next three seasons in Canadiens system with their farm team the Nova Scotia Voyageurs of the American Hockey League, but he did get his name on the Stanley Cup in 1977 as a reserve on the Canadiens' championship winning team. He also played for Team USA in the inaugural 1976 Canada Cup tournament. Polich's NHL career finally took off after he signed for the Minnesota North Stars in 1978 where he became an accomplished defensive specialist and penalty killer. He finally retired in 1981 after three years as a regular North Star.

== Career statistics ==
=== Regular season and playoffs ===
			Regular season					Playoffs
Season	Team	League	GP	G	A	Pts	PIM	GP	G	A	Pts	PIM
1969–70	Hibbing High School	HS-MN	—	—	—	—	—	—	—	—	—	—
1970–71	Hibbing High School	HS-MN	—	—	—	—	—	—	—	—	—	—
1971–72	University of Minnesota	B1G	32	8	5	13	14	—	—	—	—	—
1972–73	University of Minnesota	B1G	34	18	14	32	34	—	—	—	—	—
1973–74	University of Minnesota	B1G	40	19	33	52	36	—	—	—	—	—
1974–75	University of Minnesota	B1G	42	25	37	62	84	—	—	—	—	—
1975–76	Nova Scotia Voyageurs	AHL	75	24	19	43	66	9	4	5	9	6
1976–77	Montreal Canadiens	NHL	—	—	—	—	—	5	0	0	0	0
1976–77	Nova Scotia Voyageurs	AHL	69	19	41	60	48	11	4	4	8	6
1977–78	Montreal Canadiens	NHL	1	0	0	0	0	—	—	—	—	—
1977–78	Nova Scotia Voyageurs	AHL	79	22	38	60	70	11	2	6	8	4
1978–79	Minnesota North Stars	NHL	73	6	10	16	18	—	—	—	—	—
1978–79	Oklahoma City Stars	CHL	9	0	7	7	0	—	—	—	—	—
1979–80	Minnesota North Stars	NHL	78	10	14	24	20	15	2	1	3	2
1980–81	Minnesota North Stars	NHL	74	8	5	13	19	3	0	0	0	0
AHL totals			223	65	98	163	184	31	10	15	25	16
NHL totals			226	24	29	53	57	23	2	1	3	2

=== International ===
Year	Team	Event	GP	G	A	Pts	PIM
1974	United States	WC-B	7	7	5	12	—
1975	United States	WC	10	2	5	7	34
1976	United States	CC	5	1	1	2	4
Senior totals			22	10	11	21	—

== Awards and honors ==
Award	Year
All-NCAA All-Tournament Team	1974
All-WCHA First Team	1974–75
AHCA West All-American	1974–75

Awards and achievements
Preceded by Doug Palazzari	WCHA Most Valuable Player; 1974–75 (With Tom Ross)	Succeeded by Mike Zuke
