= George Kuzmicz =

Canadian ice hockey player

- Born: May 24, 1952; Montreal, Quebec, Canada
- Died: September 25, 2015 (aged 63); Scarborough, Ontario, Canada
- Height: 6 ft 1 in (185 cm)
- Weight: 205 lb (93 kg; 14 st 9 lb)
- Position: Defence
- Shot: Left
- Played for: Toronto Toros
- NHL draft: 138th overall, 1972; Detroit Red Wings
- Playing career: 1974–1976

George Kuzmicz (May 24, 1952 – September 25, 2015) was a Canadian professional ice hockey player who played in the World Hockey Association (WHA). Kuzmicz played parts of two WHA seasons with the Toronto Toros. He was drafted in the ninth round of the 1972 NHL Amateur Draft by the Detroit Red Wings. As a youth, he played in the 1964 Quebec International Pee-Wee Hockey Tournament with a minor ice hockey team from Cedar Hill.

== Career statistics ==
			Regular season					Playoffs
Season	Team	League	GP	G	A	Pts	PIM	GP	G	A	Pts	PIM
1971–72	Cornell University	NCAA	13	0	3	3	4	—	—	—	—	—
1972–73	Cornell University	NCAA	29	5	13	18	30	—	—	—	—	—
1973–74	Cornell University	NCAA	25	7	23	30	26	—	—	—	—	—
1974–75	Toronto Toros	WHA	34	0	12	12	22	—	—	—	—	—
1974–75	Mohawk Valley Comets	NAHL-Sr.	13	0	3	3	21	2	0	0	0	0
1975–76	Toronto Toros	WHA	1	0	0	0	0	—	—	—	—	—
1975–76	Buffalo Norsemen	NAHL-Sr.	38	1	8	9	35	—	—	—	—	—
WHA totals			35	0	12	12	22	—	—	—	—	—
NAHL-Sr. totals			51	1	11	12	56	2	0	0	0	0

== Awards and honors ==
Award	Year
All-ECAC First Team	1973–74
AHCA East All-American	1973–74

- 1973–74 Cornell Boosters Award (dedication and team play)
- 1973–74 Ivy League First All-Star Team
