= 1974 WCHA men's ice hockey tournament =

1974 WCHA Men's ice hockey tournament
- Dates: March 5–10, 1974
- Teams: 8
- Finals site: Student Ice Arena; Houghton, Michigan; Williams Arena; Minneapolis, Minnesota
- Champions: Michigan Tech† (6th title); Minnesota‡ (3rd title)
- Winning coach: John MacInnes (6th title); Herb Brooks (1st title)
- WCHA Men's Ice Hockey Tournaments

The 1974 WCHA Men's Ice Hockey Tournament was the 15th conference playoff in league history. The tournament was played between March 5 and March 10, 1974. All games were played at home team campus sites, including each of the two regional final series. By winning the regional tournaments, both Michigan Tech and Minnesota were invited to participate in the 1974 NCAA Division I Men's Ice Hockey Tournament.

Though not official designations, Michigan Tech is considered as the East Regional Champion† and Minnesota as the West Regional Champion‡.

== Format ==
The top eight teams in the WCHA, according to their final conference standings, were eligible for the tournament and were seeded No. 1 through No. 8. In the first round the first and eighth seeds, the second and seventh seeds, the third and sixth seeds and the fourth and fifth seeds were matched in two-game series where the school that scored the higher number of goals was declared the winner. After the first round the remaining teams were reseeded No. 1 through No. 4 according to their final conference standings and advanced to the second round. In the second round the first and fourth seeds and the second and third seeds competed in an additional two-game, total goal series with the winners of each being declared as co-conference champions.

=== Conference standings ===
Note: GP = Games played; W = Wins; L = Losses; T = Ties; PTS = Points; GF = Goals For; GA = Goals Against

1973–74 Western Collegiate Hockey Association standings
| | Conference | | | | | | | Overall | | | | | |
| | GP | W | L | T | PTS | GF | GA | GP | W | L | T | GF | GA |
|---|---|---|---|---|---|---|---|---|---|---|---|---|---|
| Michigan Tech†* | 28 | 20 | 6 | 2 | 42 | 155 | 95 | 40 | 28 | 9 | 3 | 218 | 135 |
| Minnesota* | 28 | 14 | 9 | 5 | 33 | 125 | 100 | 39 | 22 | 11 | 6 | 171 | 143 |
| Denver | 28 | 15 | 11 | 2 | 32 | 126 | 122 | 38 | 22 | 13 | 3 | 171 | 156 |
| Michigan State | 28 | 15 | 12 | 1 | 31 | 150 | 140 | 38 | 23 | 14 | 1 | 207 | 177 |
| Wisconsin | 28 | 12 | 11 | 5 | 29 | 124 | 105 | 36 | 18 | 13 | 5 | 170 | 141 |
| Minnesota-Duluth | 28 | 13 | 14 | 1 | 27 | 113 | 126 | 38 | 21 | 16 | 1 | 167 | 155 |
| Michigan | 28 | 12 | 15 | 1 | 25 | 107 | 131 | 36 | 18 | 17 | 1 | 147 | 162 |
| Notre Dame | 28 | 11 | 16 | 1 | 23 | 125 | 121 | 36 | 14 | 20 | 2 | 159 | 154 |
| Colorado College | 28 | 10 | 16 | 2 | 22 | 120 | 138 | 32 | 13 | 17 | 2 | 155 | 157 |
| North Dakota | 28 | 8 | 20 | 0 | 16 | 80 | 147 | 34 | 10 | 23 | 1 | 103 | 169 |
Championship: Michigan Tech, Minnesota † indicates conference regular season champion * indicates conference tournament champion

== Bracket ==
Teams are reseeded after the first round

First Round; March 5–6
1 | Michigan Tech | 4 | 2
8 | Notre Dame | 2 | 2
2 | Minnesota | 5 | 5
7 | Michigan | 1 | 4
3 | Denver | 3 | 5
6 | Minnesota-Duluth | 2 | 2
4 | Michigan State | 4 | 3
5 | Wisconsin | 1 | 4

Second Round; March 8–10
1 | Michigan Tech | 6 | 6
4 | Michigan State | 8 | 2
2 | Minnesota | 3 | 2
3 | Denver | 3 | 1

Note: * denotes overtime period(s)

=== First round ===
==== (1) Michigan Tech vs. (8) Notre Dame ====
| March 5 | Michigan Tech | 4 – 2 | Notre Dame | Student Ice Arena |

| March 6 | Michigan Tech | 2 – 2 | Notre Dame | Student Ice Arena |

| Michigan Tech won series 6–4 |

==== (2) Minnesota vs. (7) Michigan ====
| March 5 | Minnesota | 5 – 1 | Michigan | Williams Arena |

| March 6 | Minnesota | 5 – 4 | Michigan | Williams Arena |

| Minnesota won series 10–5 |

==== (3) Denver vs. (6) Minnesota-Duluth ====
| March 5 | Denver | 3 – 2 | Minnesota-Duluth | DU Arena |

| March 6 | Denver | 5 – 2 | Minnesota-Duluth | DU Arena |

| Denver won series 8–4 |

==== (4) Michigan State vs. (5) Wisconsin ====
| March 5 | Michigan State | 4 – 1 | Wisconsin | Munn Ice Arena |

| March 6 | Michigan State | 3 – 4 | Wisconsin | Munn Ice Arena |

| Michigan State won series 7–5 |

=== Second round ===
==== (1) Michigan Tech vs. (4) Michigan State ====
| March 8 | Michigan Tech | 6 – 8 | Michigan State | Student Ice Arena |

| March 9 | Michigan Tech | 6 – 2 | Michigan State | Student Ice Arena |

| Michigan Tech won series 12–10 |

==== (2) Minnesota vs. (3) Denver ====
| March 9 | Minnesota | 3 – 3 | Denver | Williams Arena |

| March 10 | Minnesota | 2 – 1 | Denver | Williams Arena |

| Minnesota won series 5–4 |

== Tournament awards ==
None

== See also ==
- Western Collegiate Hockey Association men's champions
