= Warren Miller (ice hockey) =

American ice hockey player (born 1953)

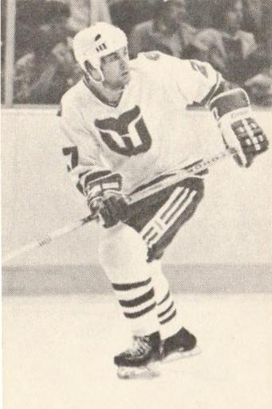
- Miller in 1981 photo
- Born: June 15, 1953 (age 72) Saint Paul, Minnesota, U.S
- Height: 5 ft 11 in (180 cm)
- Weight: 180 lb (82 kg; 12 st 12 lb)
- Position: Right wing
- Shot: Right
- Played for: Calgary Cowboys; Edmonton Oilers; Quebec Nordiques; New England Whalers; New York Rangers; Hartford Whalers
- National team: United States
- NHL draft: 241st overall, 1974; New York Rangers
- WHA draft: 132nd overall, 1974; New England Whalers
- Playing career: 1976–1983

Warren Fredrick Miller (born June 15, 1953) is an American former professional ice hockey player. He played 238 games in the World Hockey Association and 262 games in the National Hockey League between 1976 and 1983. Internationally Miller played for the American national team at the 1977 and 1981 World Championships and the 1981 Canada Cup.

== Playing career ==
After playing for South St. Paul High School in Minnesota, Miller enrolled at the University of Minnesota where he had a four-year collegiate career. Miller helped the Golden Gophers to two NCAA championship titles in his sophomore (1974) and senior (1976) seasons while playing for Hall of Fame coach Herb Brooks.

Miller was drafted by the New York Rangers of the National Hockey League (NHL) in the 21st Round (241st overall) of the 1974 NHL Amateur Draft and was also selected by the Vancouver Blazers of the World Hockey Association (WHA) in the 1974 WHA Amateur Draft. The Calgary Cowboys retained Miller's rights after the franchise relocated from Vancouver, and following his college career Miller elected to play with Calgary where he played 83 games in parts of two seasons with the Cowboys tallying 55 points (23 G, 32 A) before the franchise folded.

Obtained by the Edmonton Oilers before the 1977-78 he played 18 games scoring two goals with four assists before being traded to the Quebec Nordiques with Dave Inkpen, Rick Morris and Ken Broderick for Don McLeod and Pierre Guité. In 60 games with Quebec, he had 38 points (14 goals, 24 assists).

Before the 1978-79 season Miller was traded to the New England Whalers for Jean-Louis Levasseur. In the WHA's final season, he notched a career high in goals with 26 adding 23 assists for 49 points. In the NHL-WHA merger before the 1979-80 season, Miller was re-claimed during the expansion draft by the Rangers, who held his NHL rights. In one season in New York, he played 55 games but had only 13 points on six goals and seven assists.

The following season he was sold back to the Hartford Whalers for cash considerations. He played the final three seasons of his career in the mall scoring 33 goals, assisting on 44 others for 77 points in his final 207 games.

Overall he played in 262 games in the NHL and 238 games in the WHA for five franchises over eight professional seasons.

== International play ==
Miller was also a member of the American national team at the 1981 Canada Cup and 1977 and 1981 World Championships.

== Career statistics ==
=== Regular season and playoffs ===
			Regular season					Playoffs
Season	Team	League	GP	G	A	Pts	PIM	GP	G	A	Pts	PIM
1971–72	South St. Paul High School	HS-MN	—	—	—	—	—	—	—	—	—	—
1972–73	University of Minnesota	WCHA	32	5	3	8	22	—	—	—	—	—
1973–74	University of Minnesota	WCHA	40	11	16	27	34	—	—	—	—	—
1974–75	University of Minnesota	WCHA	41	16	21	37	40	—	—	—	—	—
1975–76	University of Minnesota	WCHA	44	26	31	57	52	—	—	—	—	—
1975–76	Calgary Cowboys	WHA	3	0	0	0	0	10	1	0	1	28
1976–77	Calgary Cowboys	WHA	80	23	32	55	51	—	—	—	—	—
1977–78	Edmonton Oilers	WHA	18	2	4	6	18	—	—	—	—	—
1977–78	Quebec Nordiques	WHA	60	14	24	38	50	11	0	2	2	0
1978–79	New England Whalers	WHA	77	26	23	49	44	10	0	8	8	28
1979–80	New York Rangers	NHL	55	7	6	13	17	6	1	0	1	0
1980–81	Hartford Whalers	NHL	77	22	22	44	37	—	—	—	—	—
1981–82	Hartford Whalers	NHL	74	10	12	22	68	—	—	—	—	—
1982–83	Hartford Whalers	NHL	56	1	10	11	15	—	—	—	—	—
WHA totals			238	65	83	148	163	31	1	10	11	56
NHL totals			262	40	50	90	137	6	1	0	1	0

=== International ===
Year	Team	Event	GP	G	A	Pts	PIM
1977	United States	WC	10	2	2	4	4
1981	United States	WC	7	3	2	5	4
1981	United States	CC	6	2	0	2	2
Senior totals			23	7	4	11	10

== Awards and honors ==
Award	Year
All-NCAA All-Tournament Team	1975
