= John Perpich =

Biographical details
- Born: Hibbing, Minnesota, U.S.
- Education: Minnesota

Playing career
- 1970–1974: Minnesota
- 1974–1975: Johnstown Jets
- Position: Defenceman

Coaching career (HC unless noted)
- 1978–1982: Minnesota (assistant)
- 1982–1983: USA U-20 (assistant)
- 1983–1984: USA U-20
- 1984–1986: St. Cloud State
- 1986–1990: Ferris State
- 1990–1994: Washington Capitals (assistant)
- 1994–1996: Los Angeles Kings (assistant)
- 1996–1997: Phoenix Roadrunners
- 1997–1998: Fredericton Canadiens (assistant)
- 1999–2011: Atlanta Thrashers (scout)
- 2011–2014: Winnipeg Jets (scout)
- 2014–present: Ottawa Senators (scout)

Head coaching record
- Overall: 84-116-21 (.428)

Accomplishments and honors

Championships
- 1974 National Champion (player); 1979 National Champion (assistant)

John Perpich is an NHL scout for the Ottawa Senators. He served as an assistant coach at the NHL level as well as being a head coach in both the IHL and NCAA. In 2014 he was hired by Ottawa as a scout.

== Career ==
Hailing from Hibbing, Minnesota Perpich was recruited to play for the home state Golden Gophers under Glen Sonmor. Perpich played sparingly in his first two seasons but soon found himself in a new regime when Sonmor was fired half-way through his sophomore season and the interim Ken Yackel was not retained. Under new bench boss Herb Brooks Perpich saw greater ice time, culminating in Minnesota's first national title in his senior season while also acting as an alternate captain. Perpich played one season for the Johnstown Jets after graduating before retiring as a player.

In 1978 Perpich returned to his alma mater, becoming an assistant on Brooks' staff just in time to be part of Minnesota's third national title. He remained with the university until 1982 before becoming first an assistant and then head coach for the US world junior team. Though the US failed to medal in either of the two years he was with the team Perpich was offered the head coaching job at St. Cloud State. Perpich would remain with the Division III program for two years before moving to the Division I ranks with the Ferris State Bulldogs. In four seasons with the Bulldogs Perpich's teams would win fewer games than the previous year, never finishing with a winning record and going 1-8 in postseason conference play.

Perpich left the college ranks behind in 1990 and was promptly hired by the Washington Capitals as an assistant coach. He spent four seasons with Washington before taking the same position with Los Angeles. After two more years as an assistant Perpich was named as head coach for the Phoenix Roadrunners. In what would turn out to be their last season in existence Perpich led the Roadrunners to 27-42-13 record, good enough for second-worst in the league. Perpich spent the following year with the Fredericton Canadiens as an assistant before hanging up his coach's whistle.

After a year away from the game Perpich returned to the NHL as a scout for the expansion Atlanta Thrashers and worked for the team for its entire existence, remaining with the franchise even after it moved and became the Winnipeg Jets. In 2014 Perpich left the Jets to take the a scouting position with the Ottawa Senators, a position he holds as of 2016.

== Head coaching record ==
Record table
| Season | Team | Overall | Conference | Standing | Postseason |
|---|---|---|---|---|---|
St. Cloud State Huskies (NCHA) (1984–1986)
| 1984–85 | St. Cloud State | 14-13-2 | 9-7-2 | 2nd | |
| 1985–86 | St. Cloud State | 16-11-2 | 8-9-1 | 5th | |
| St. Cloud State: | | 30-24-4 | 17-16-3 | | |
Ferris State Bulldogs (CCHA) (1986–1990)
| 1986–87 | Ferris State | 16-27-0 | 9-23-0 | 8th | CCHA Quarterfinals |
| 1987–88 | Ferris State | 15-20-5 | 11-17-4 | 7th | CCHA Quarterfinals |
| 1988–89 | Ferris State | 12-22-6 | 9-18-5 | 7th | CCHA Quarterfinals |
| 1989–90 | Ferris State | 11-23-6 | 6-20-6 | 8th | CCHA Quarterfinals |
| Ferris State: | | 54-92-17 | 35-78-15 | | |
| Total: | | 84-116-21 | | | |
National champion Postseason invitational champion Conference regular season champion Conference regular season and conference tournament champion Division regular season champion Division regular season and conference tournament champion Conference tournament champion
