= Bill Burlington (ice hockey) =

Canadian ice hockey player

- Born: 1952 (age 73–74) Owen Sound, Ontario, Canada
- Height: 5 ft 11 in (180 cm)
- Weight: 165 lb (75 kg; 11 st 11 lb)
- Position: Center
- Shot: Left
- Played for: Boston University; Cambridge Hornets; Durham Huskies
- Playing career: 1972–1980

William Burlington (born 1952) is a Canadian retired ice hockey center who was an All-American for Boston University.

== Early life ==
Burlington was born in Owen Sound. He played junior hockey and lead the junior-B level in scoring as a member of the Owen Sound Greys during the 1970–71 season. Burlington attended Boston University and, despite the NCAA having changed their rules, the Boston University Terriers men's ice hockey team had their first-year players serve on a freshman team. Burlington joined the varsity squad, but the team was upset by Pennsylvania in the first round of the conference tournament.

After the 1973 season, BU was forced to forfeit 11 games for after using an ineligible player, leading to the firing of coach Leon Abbott in the middle of Burlington's junior year. New head coach Jack Parker eventually lead the Terriers to an ECAC championship in 1974. Burlington was named an All-American for the season. In his first NCAA tournament appearance, Burlington's team fell 4–5 in the semifinal to eventual champion Minnesota and finished third in the four-team field. During Burlington's senior season, the Terriers won an ECAC championship and finishing third in the NCAA Tournament.

== Career ==
After BU, Burlington continued his playing career and sought to win an Allan Cup. While playing senior hockey, Burlington took time off to earn his B.A. from Lakehead University in 1978 but his playing career was ended abruptly after a serious injury in 1980. Burlington was slashed on the jaw, breaking the bone in seven places.

Burlington and his wife Cheryl travelled to the Northwest Territories and began pursuing careers as educators. Bill became a gym teacher at Sir John Franklin High School in Yellowknife and spent more than 25 years teaching at the school. While coaching both the boys and girls hockey teams, Burlington continued to playing, winning four gold medals in hockey at the Arctic Winter Games.

== Career statistics ==
=== Regular season and playoffs ===
			Regular Season					Playoffs
Season	Team	League	GP	G	A	Pts	PIM	GP	G	A	Pts	PIM
1970–71	Owen Sound Greys	COJHL	—	—	—	—	—	—	—	—	—	—
1972–73	Boston University	ECAC Hockey	28	10	15	25	14	—	—	—	—	—
1973–74	Boston University	ECAC Hockey	31	15	30	45	10	—	—	—	—	—
1974–75	Boston University	ECAC Hockey	32	17	31	48	14	—	—	—	—	—
1976–77	Barrie Flyers	OHA-Sr.	30	11	11	22	14	—	—	—	—	—
1976–77	Cambridge Hornets	OHA-Sr.	2	1	3	4	0	—	—	—	—	—
1979–80	Durham Huskies	CSAHL	69	17	36	53	48	—	—	—	—	—
NCAA Totals			91	42	76	118	38	—	—	—	—	—

== Awards and honors ==
Award	Year
All-ECAC Hockey First Team	1973–74
AHCA East All-American	1973–74
