= Doug Palazzari =

American ice hockey player and executive

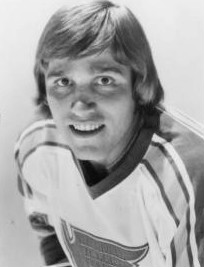
- Palazzari in 1975 as a member of the St. Louis Blues.
- Born: November 3, 1952 (age 73) Eveleth, Minnesota, U.S.A.
- Height: 5 ft 5 in (165 cm)
- Weight: 170 lb (77 kg; 12 st 2 lb)
- Position: Center
- Shot: Left
- Played for: St. Louis Blues
- National team: United States
- NHL draft: Undrafted
- Playing career: 1974–1982

Douglas John Palazzari (born November 3, 1952, in Eveleth, Minnesota) is a former professional ice hockey player and USA Hockey executive. He is the son of former NHL player Aldo Palazzari. Too small to become a regular in the National Hockey League, Doug Palazzari played a total of 108 games for the St. Louis Blues in 1974–79 but he spent most of his professional career in the minors with the Providence Reds, Kansas City Blues and Salt Lake Golden Eagles where he was a major star. Before turning professional, he was an accomplished player for the Colorado College men's ice hockey team and he also played for the United States national team at the 1973 and 1974 Ice Hockey World Championship tournaments. Palazzari was also a member of the United States team at the inaugural 1976 Canada Cup.

Palazzari is perhaps best known for his management work for amateur hockey in the United States after retiring from professional hockey in 1982. He was elected executive director of USA Hockey in 1999 after spending 14 years with the organization in various capabilities. He resigned as director in 2005. Palazzari was inducted into the United States Hockey Hall of Fame in 2000.

== Career statistics ==
			Regular season					Playoffs
Season	Team	League	GP	G	A	Pts	PIM	GP	G	A	Pts	PIM
1970–71	Colorado College	NCAA	26	8	17	25	37	—	—	—	—	—
1971–72	Colorado College	NCAA	32	32	40	72	42	—	—	—	—	—
1972–73	Colorado College	NCAA	27	24	28	52	32	—	—	—	—	—
1973–74	Colorado College	NCAA	32	31	48	79	71	—	—	—	—	—
1974–75	St. Louis Blues	NHL	73	14	17	31	19	—	—	—	—	—
1975–76	Providence Reds	AHL	55	19	32	51	72	—	—	—	—	—
1976–77	Kansas City Blues	CHL	41	18	34	52	31	—	—	—	—	—
1976–77	St. Louis Blues	NHL	12	1	0	1	0	—	—	—	—	—
1977–78	Salt Lake Golden Eagles	CHL	70	45	56	101	82	—	—	—	—	—
1977–78	St. Louis Blues	NHL	3	1	0	1	0	—	—	—	—	—
1978–79	Salt Lake Golden Eagles	CHL	35	24	32	56	19	—	—	—	—	—
1978–79	St. Louis Blues	NHL	20	2	3	5	4	—	—	—	—	—
1979–80	Salt Lake Golden Eagles	CHL	74	48	61	109	62	—	—	—	—	—
1980–81	Salt Lake Golden Eagles	CHL	27	26	21	47	57	—	—	—	—	—
1981–82	Salt Lake Golden Eagles	CHL	68	34	41	75	44	—	—	—	—	—
1982–83	Villacher SV	Austria	4	3	2	5	20	—	—	—	—	—
NHL totals			108	18	20	38	23	—	—	—	—	—

== Awards and honors ==
Award	Year
All-WCHA First Team	1971–72
AHCA West All-American	1971–72
All-WCHA First Team	1973–74
AHCA West All-American	1973–74
CHL First All-Star Team	1978, 1980
Scoring Leader - CHL	1978
Tommy Ivan Trophy (MVP - CHL)	1978, 1980
Phil Esposito Trophy (Scoring Leader - CHL)	1980

Awards and achievements
Preceded by Bob Murray; Ron Grahame	WCHA Most Valuable Player; 1971–72; 1973–74	Succeeded by Ron Grahame; Mike Polich / Tom Ross
Preceded by Steve West	CHL Leading Scorer; 1977–78	Succeeded by Rick Shinske
Preceded by Barclay Plager	Winner of the Tommy Ivan Trophy; 1977–78	Succeeded by Ron Low
Preceded by Rick Shinske	Winner of the Phil Esposito Trophy; 1979–80	Succeeded by Joe Mullen
Preceded by Ron Low	Winner of the Tommy Ivan Trophy; 1979–80	Succeeded by Joe Mullen
