= Les Auge =

American ice hockey player (1953–2002)

- Born: May 16, 1953 Saint Paul, Minnesota, U.S.
- Died: September 20, 2002 (aged 49) Saint Paul, Minnesota, U.S.
- Height: 6 ft 0 in (183 cm)
- Weight: 190 lb (86 kg; 13 st 8 lb)
- Position: Defense
- Shot: Right
- Played for: Colorado Rockies
- National team: United States
- NHL draft: Undrafted
- Playing career: 1975–1982

Lester Alexander Auge (May 16, 1953 – September 20, 2002) was an American ice hockey defenseman who appeared in a total of six National Hockey League regular season games with the Colorado Rockies in 1980–81 but spent most of his career in the minor leagues. He was born in St. Paul, Minnesota. Auge was signed as a free agent by the Rockies after playing for the United States team at the 1979 Ice Hockey World Championship tournament as well as the University of Minnesota men's hockey team. Auge was part of the initial roster for the 1980 United States Olympic team, but did not make the final team.

== Career statistics ==
=== Regular season and playoffs ===
			Regular season					Playoffs
Season	Team	League	GP	G	A	Pts	PIM	GP	G	A	Pts	PIM
1971–72	University of Minnesota	WCHA	22	2	14	16	8	—	—	—	—	—
1972–73	University of Minnesota	WCHA	34	3	23	26	44	—	—	—	—	—
1973–74	University of Minnesota	WCHA	40	8	28	36	58	—	—	—	—	—
1974–75	University of Minnesota	WCHA	38	6	20	26	52	—	—	—	—	—
1975–76	Rochester Americans	AHL	10	0	3	3	6	—	—	—	—	—
1975–76	Dayton Gems	IHL	65	11	29	40	59	15	1	6	7	10
1976–77	Dayton Gems	IHL	29	3	8	11	34	—	—	—	—	—
1977–78	Hershey Bears	AHL	2	0	0	0	0	—	—	—	—	—
1977–78	Port Huron Flags	IHL	78	3	37	40	104	17	2	13	15	20
1978–79	Oklahoma City Stars	CHL	70	4	14	18	42	—	—	—	—	—
1979–80	Hershey Bears	AHL	4	0	0	0	0	—	—	—	—	—
1979–80	Fort Worth Texans	CHL	50	6	24	30	26	15	1	3	4	2
1979–80	United States National Team	Intl	29	0	14	14	14	—	—	—	—	—
1980–81	Colorado Rockies	NHL	6	0	3	3	4	—	—	—	—	—
1980–81	Fort Worth Texans	CHL	70	6	17	23	56	5	0	3	3	4
1981–82	Fort Worth Texans	CHL	20	0	8	8	26	—	—	—	—	—
CHL totals			210	16	63	79	150	20	1	6	7	6
NHL totals			6	0	3	3	4	—	—	—	—	—

=== International ===
Year	Team	Event	GP	G	A	Pts	PIM
1979	United States	WC	8	1	0	1	4
Senior totals			8	1	0	1	4

== Awards and honors ==
Award	Year
All-NCAA All-Tournament Team	1974
All-WCHA Second Team	1974–75
AHCA West All-American	1974–75

== In popular culture ==
In the 1981 made-for-TV movie Miracle on Ice, Auge was portrayed by Jerry Houser.
