= Ed Walsh (ice hockey) =

American ice hockey player (b. 1951)

- Born: September 18, 1951 (age 74) Somerville, Massachusetts, U.S.
- Height: 5 ft 10 in (178 cm)
- Weight: 180 lb (82 kg; 12 st 12 lb)
- Position: Goaltender
- Caught: Left
- Played for: Nova Scotia Voyageurs; Rochester Americans; Springfield Indians
- National team: United States
- Playing career: 1974–1980

Edward Walsh (born August 18, 1951) is an American former professional ice hockey goaltender who played three games in the World Hockey Association for the Edmonton Oilers.

== Early life ==
Walsh was born in Somerville, Massachusetts. As a youth, he played in the 1963 and 1964 Quebec International Pee-Wee Hockey Tournaments with a minor ice hockey team from Boston. He later played goaltender for Boston University.

== Career ==
Walsh spent most of his career in the minors with the American Hockey League Nova Scotia Voyageurs, Rochester Americans and Springfield Indians.

Walsh played on the United States men's national ice hockey team at the 1974 and 1981 Ice Hockey World Championships and was invited to the team's training camp for the 1976 Canada Cup, although he did not make the final team.

== Career statistics ==
=== Regular season and playoffs ===
			Regular season									Playoffs
Season	Team	League	GP	W	L	T	MIN	GA	SO	GAA	SV%	GP	W	L	MIN	GA	SO	GAA	SV%
1966–67	West New York Raiders	NYMetJHL	Statistics Unavailable
1967–68	West New York Raiders	NYMetJHL	Statistics Unavailable
1971–72	Boston University	ECAC	3	—	—	—	75	3	0	2.40	.906	—	—	—	—	—	—	—	—
1972–73	Boston University	ECAC	27	—	—	—	—	79	0	2.94	.911	—	—	—	—	—	—	—	—
1973–74	Boston University	ECAC	29	—	—	—	1633	78	2	2.86	.911	—	—	—	—	—	—	—	—
1974–75	Nova Scotia Voyageurs	AHL	46	27	13	6	2763	128	2	2.77	.908	2	—	—	—	—	—	—	—
1975–76	Nova Scotia Voyageurs	AHL	31	—	—	—	1782	91	2	3.06	—	4	—	—	—	—	—	—	—
1976–77	Nova Scotia Voyageurs	AHL	40	26	12	2	2411	115	3	2.86	.912	7	—	—	—	—	—	—	—
1977–78	Nova Scotia Voyageurs	AHL	5	2	3	0	360	20	0	4.00	.876	—	—	—	—	—	—	—
1977–78	Springfield Indians	AHL	13	5	7	1	744	64	0	5.16	.857	—	—	—	—	—	—	—	—
1977–78	Broome Dusters	AHL	13	5	7	1	744	64	0	4.98	.865	—	—	—	—	—	—	—	—
1978–79	Dallas Black Hawks	CHL	14	8	2	0	698	44	1	3.78	.864	1	—	—	—	—	—	—	—
1978–79	Edmonton Oilers	WHA	3	0	2	0	144	9	0	3.75	.836	—	—	—	—	—	—	—	—
1979–80	Rochester Americans	AHL	50	17	27	5	2891	196	0	4.07	.863	3	—	—	—	—	—	—	—
WHA totals			3	0	2	0	144	9	0	3.75	.836	—	—	—	—	—	—	—	—

== Awards and honors ==
Award	Year
AHCA East All-American	1972–73
All-ECAC Hockey First Team	1973–74

Awards and achievements
Preceded by Carlo Ugolini	ECAC Hockey Most Outstanding Player in Tournament; 1974	Succeeded by Rick Meagher
