= Larry H. Smith =

American ice hockey player (1939–2012)

Larry H. Smith US National Team passport (1963)

Larry Hugh Smith (March 16, 1939 – April 12, 2002) was a U.S. National hockey player, a 6'3" center who played at Camden High School in Minneapolis, Minnesota, and for the University of Minnesota, where he was coached by the legendary John Mariucci.

Smith was born in Minneapolis, and played for the U.S. National hockey team in 1963 after a career on the University of Minnesota Golden Gophers hockey team, from 1958 to 1962, where he played in 70 games and scored a total of 29 career goals with 21 assists.

Smith died of pancreatic cancer in 2002 at age 63.

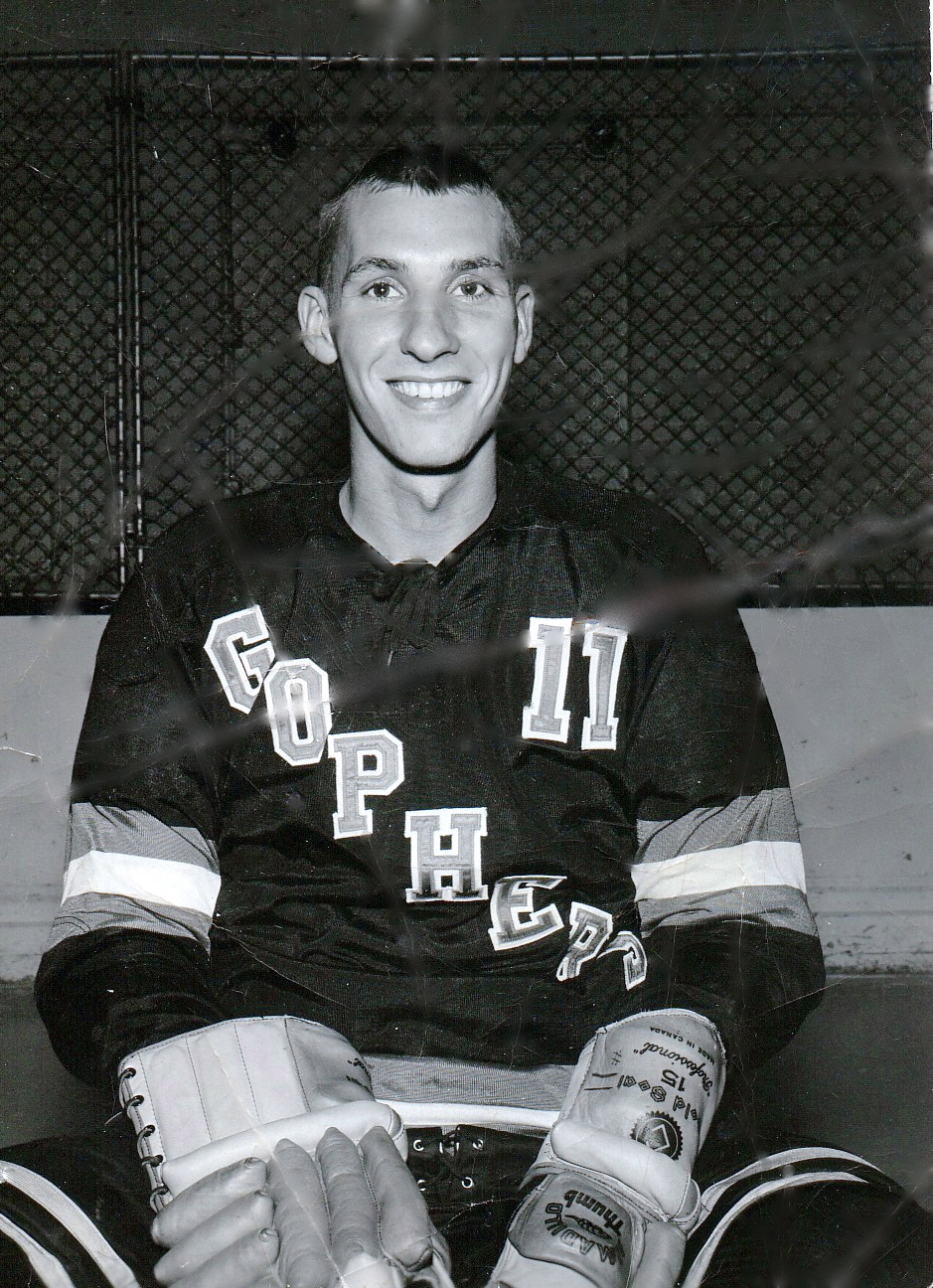
Larry H. Smith University of Minnesota Golden Gophers (1958)
