= 1973–74 NCAA Division I men's ice hockey season =

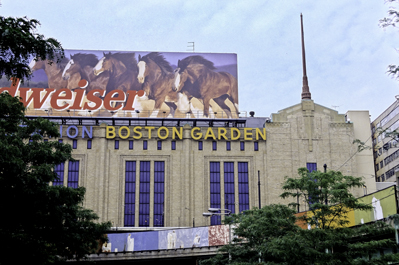
- The Boston Garden served as the host for the 1974 Tournament
- Duration: October 1973– March 16, 1974
- NCAA tournament: 1974
- National championship: Boston Garden; Boston, Massachusetts
- NCAA champion: Minnesota

The 1973–74 NCAA Division I men's ice hockey season began in October 1973 and concluded with the 1974 NCAA Division I Men's Ice Hockey Tournament's championship game on March 16, 1974, at the Boston Garden in Boston, Massachusetts. This was the 27th season in which an NCAA ice hockey championship was held and is the 80th year overall where an NCAA school fielded a team.

In the summer of 1973 the NCAA changed the classifications of the tiers in each of their sponsored sports. The university- and College-divisions were done away with and replaced by numerical designations making this the first official Division I season.

The NIT held a competing ice hockey tournament for the first time. The tournament included NAIA champion Lake Superior State, ECAC 2 champion Vermont and two NCAA Division I schools (Minnesota–Duluth and Saint Louis). Minnesota–Duluth won the championship but the tournament was not renewed for a second season.

== Season Outlook ==
=== Pre-season poll ===
The top teams in the nation voted on by coaches before the start of the season. The poll was compiled by radio station WMPL.

WMPL Poll
Rank	Team
1	Wisconsin (8)
2	Notre Dame
3	Denver
4	Michigan Tech (1)
5	Boston University
6	Cornell (1)
7	Saint Louis
8	Harvard
9	Boston College
10	Michigan State

=== Pre-season conference polls ===
Conference pre-season polls as voted on by coaches. The ECAC coaches voted on the top eight teams instead of the entire conference.

ECAC Poll
Rank	Team
1	Cornell
2	Boston College
3	Boston University
4	Harvard
5	New Hampshire
6	Brown
7	Dartmouth
8	Rensselaer
9	Clarkson
10	Pennsylvania
11	Pennsylvania
12	St. Lawrence
13	Providence
14	Northeastern

WCHA Poll
Rank	Team
1	Wisconsin
2	Notre Dame
3	Michigan Tech
4	Denver
5	Michigan State
6	Minnesota
7	North Dakota
8	Michigan
9	Minnesota Duluth
10	Colorado College

== Regular season ==
=== Season tournaments ===
Tournament	Dates	Teams	Champion
Christmas City of the North Tournament	November 22–24	4	Minnesota–Duluth
North Country Thanksgiving Festival	November 22–24	4	Toronto
Flint IMA Tournament	December 27–28	4	Michigan
St. Louis Holiday Tournament	December 27–28	4	Saint Louis
Rensselaer Holiday Tournament	December 27–29	4	Boston University
Great Lakes Invitational	December 28–29	4	Michigan State
Syracuse Invitational	December 28–29	4	Cornell
Beanpot	February 4, 11	4	Harvard
Lake Forest Tournament	February 22–23	4	Saint Mary's

=== Standings ===
1973–74 Big Ten standings
	Conference							Overall					
	GP	W	L	T	PTS	GF	GA	GP	W	L	T	GF	GA
Wisconsin†	12	5	4	3	13	55	45	36	18	13	5	170	141
Minnesota†	12	5	4	3	13	50	47	39	22	11	6	171	143
Michigan State	12	5	6	1	11	61	63	38	23	14	1	207	177
Michigan	12	5	6	1	11	47	59	36	18	17	1	147	162
† indicates conference regular season champion

1973–74 Central Collegiate Hockey Association standings
	Conference							Overall					
	GP	W	L	T	PTS	GF	GA	GP	W	L	T	GF	GA
Lake Superior State†	8	5	3	0	10	40	33	39	22	16	1	205	159
Saint Louis*	8	5	3	0	10	35	37	40	28	12	0	224	165
Bowling Green	8	2	6	0	4	32	37	39	20	19	0	217	167
Championship: Saint Louis † indicates conference regular season champion * indicates conference tournament champion

1973–74 ECAC Hockey standings
	Conference							Overall					
	GP	W	L	T	Pct.	GF	GA	GP	W	L	T	GF	GA
New Hampshire†	20	15	5	0	.750	113	71	31	22	9	0	171	105
Harvard	21	15	6	0	.714	166	109	29	17	11	1	155	113
Boston University*	20	14	6	0	.700	167	89	31	23	8	0	190	95
Cornell	20	13	6	1	.675	135	108	27	19	7	1	146	110
St. Lawrence	17	9	7	1	.559	79	83	28	12	15	1	125	123
Dartmouth	22	12	10	0	.545	93	104	25	13	11	1	99	100
Providence	19	9	9	1	.500	83	103	26	14	11	1	115	113
Rensselaer	17	8	9	0	.471	101	116	30	14	15	1	141	142
Clarkson	21	9	11	1	.452	70	89	27	12	14	1	97	115
Pennsylvania	21	9	12	0	.429	67	71	24	10	14	0	75	87
Boston College	19	8	11	0	.421	89	98	28	16	12	0	137	138
Northeastern	19	7	10	2	.421	74	88	27	10	13	4	116	124
Brown	18	7	11	0	.389	63	69	23	10	13	0	87	86
Princeton	20	7	12	1	.375	62	100	24	9	14	1	87	117
Yale	18	5	13	0	.278	60	91	24	8	16	0	80	114
Colgate	20	5	14	1	.275	73	104	28	11	16	1	122	133
Championship: Boston University † indicates conference regular season champion * indicates conference tournament champion

1973–74 NCAA Division I Independent ice hockey standings
	Conference							Overall					
	GP	W	L	T	PTS	GF	GA	GP	W	L	T	GF	GA
Air Force	0	0	0	0	-	-	-	27	12	15	0	143	127
Ohio State	0	0	0	0	-	-	-	31	16	13	2	162	123

1973–74 Western Collegiate Hockey Association standings
	Conference							Overall					
	GP	W	L	T	PTS	GF	GA	GP	W	L	T	GF	GA
Michigan Tech†*	28	20	6	2	42	155	95	40	28	9	3	218	135
Minnesota*	28	14	9	5	33	125	100	39	22	11	6	171	143
Denver	28	15	11	2	32	126	122	38	22	13	3	171	156
Michigan State	28	15	12	1	31	150	140	38	23	14	1	207	177
Wisconsin	28	12	11	5	29	124	105	36	18	13	5	170	141
Minnesota-Duluth	28	13	14	1	27	113	126	38	21	16	1	167	155
Michigan	28	12	15	1	25	107	131	36	18	17	1	147	162
Notre Dame	28	11	16	1	23	125	121	36	14	20	2	159	154
Colorado College	28	10	16	2	22	120	138	32	13	17	2	155	157
North Dakota	28	8	20	0	16	80	147	34	10	23	1	103	169
Championship: Michigan Tech, Minnesota † indicates conference regular season champion * indicates conference tournament champion

=== Final regular season polls ===
The final top 10 teams as ranked by coaches (WMPL) before the conference tournament finals.

WMPL Coaches Poll
Ranking	Team
1	Michigan Tech
2	Minnesota
3	Boston University
4	New Hampshire
5	Michigan State
6	Denver
7	Harvard
8	Cornell
9	Saint Louis
9 (tie)	Minnesota Duluth

== 1974 NCAA Tournament ==
Semifinals; March 14–15
E1	Boston University	4
W2	Minnesota	5
W1	Michigan Tech	6*
E2	Harvard	5

National championship March 16
W2	Minnesota	4
W1	Michigan Tech	2
Third-place game
E1	Boston University	7
E2	Harvard	5

Note: * denotes overtime period(s)

== Player stats ==
=== Scoring leaders ===
The following players led the league in points at the conclusion of the season.

GP = Games played; G = Goals; A = Assists; Pts = Points; PIM = Penalty minutes

Player	Class	Team	GP	G	A	Pts	PIM
Steve Colp	Sophomore	Michigan State	38	43	54	97	48
Tom Ross	Sophomore	Michigan State	38	37	51	88	32
Bob Dobek	Sophomore	Bowling Green	39	44	42	86	40
Doug Palazzari	Senior	Colorado College	32	31	48	79	71
John Nestic	Senior	Saint Louis	40	41	35	76	10
Mike Zuke	Sophomore	Michigan Tech	40	28	47	75	38
Darryl Rice	Sophomore	Michigan State	38	31	38	69	54
John Stewart	Sophomore	Bowling Green	39	27	42	69	50
Bob D'Alvise	Junior	Michigan Tech	40	29	39	68	4
Chuck Delich	Freshman	Air Force	27	43	24	67	36

=== Leading goaltenders ===
The following goaltenders led the league in goals against average at the end of the regular season while playing at least 33% of their team's total minutes.

GP = Games played; Min = Minutes played; W = Wins; L = Losses; OT = Overtime/shootout losses; GA = Goals against; SO = Shutouts; SV% = Save percentage; GAA = Goals against average

Player	Class	Team	GP	Min	W	L	OT	GA	SO	SV%	GAA
Cap Raeder	Sophomore	New Hampshire	22	1318	15	7	0	58	1	.908	2.64
Ed Walsh	Junior	Boston University	29	1633	-	-	-	78	2	.911	2.86
Jim Warden	Sophomore	Michigan Tech	13	-	-	-	-	-	-	.910	3.01
Rick Quance	Junior	Michigan Tech	21	-	-	-	-	-	-	.894	3.01
Brad Shelstad	Senior	Minnesota	34	2148	-	-	-	111	1	.906	3.10
Barney Buppert	Sophomore	New Hampshire	11	520	-	-	-	32	0	.873	3.69
Harry Aikens	Freshman	St. Lawrence	12	616	-	-	-	38	0	.903	3.70
Gordy Hangsleben	Freshman	North Dakota	-	-	-	-	-	-	0	.900	3.74
Dick Perkins	Sophomore	Wisconsin	23	1381	10	8	4	87	0	.891	3.78
Syl LaRose	Freshman	Clarkson	23	1311	10	-	-	83	0	.896	3.80

== Awards ==
=== NCAA ===
Award		Recipient
Spencer Penrose Award		Charlie Holt, New Hampshire
Most Outstanding Player in NCAA Tournament		Brad Shelstad, Minnesota
AHCA All-American Teams
East Team	Position	West Team
Cap Raeder, New Hampshire	G	Robbie Moore, Michigan
George Kuzmicz, Cornell	D	Norm Barnes, Michigan State
Vic Stanfield, Boston University	D	Jim Nahrgang, Michigan Tech
Bill Burlington, Boston University	F	Steve Colp, Michigan State
Gordie Clark, New Hampshire	F	Doug Palazzari, Colorado College
Randy Roth, Harvard	F	Mike Zuke, Michigan Tech

=== CCHA ===
No Awards
All-CCHA Teams
First Team	Position	Second Team
Pat Tims, Lake Superior State	G	Ralph Kloiber, Saint Louis
Roger Archer, Bowling Green	D	Mario Faubert, Saint Louis
Tom Davies, Lake Superior State	D	Bill Slewidge, Lake Superior State
Bob Dobek, Bowling Green	F	John Stewart, Bowling Green
Kim Gellert, Lake Superior State	F	Rick Kennedy, Saint Louis
John Nestic, Saint Louis	F	Charlie Labelle, Saint Louis

=== ECAC ===
Award		Recipient
Player of the Year		Randy Roth, Harvard
Rookie of the Year		Ron Wilson, Providence
Most Outstanding Player in Tournament		Ed Walsh, Boston University
All-ECAC Hockey Teams
First Team	Position	Second Team
Ed Walsh, Boston University	G	Cap Raeder, New Hampshire
Vic Stanfield, Boston University	D	Levy Byrd, Harvard
George Kuzmicz, Cornell	D	Peter Brown, Boston University
Bill Burlington, Boston University	F	Bob Goodenow, Harvard
Gordie Clark, New Hampshire	F	Tom Fleming, Dartmouth
Randy Roth, Harvard	F	Rick Meagher, Boston University

=== WCHA ===
Award		Recipient
Most Valuable Player		Doug Palazzari, Colorado College
Freshman of the Year		Brian Walsh, Notre Dame
Coach of the Year		Herb Brooks, Minnesota
All-WCHA Teams
First Team	Position	Second Team
Brad Shelstad, Minnesota	G	Rick Quance, Michigan Tech
Jim Nahrgang, Michigan Tech	D	Gord McDonald, Minnesota-Duluth
Norm Barnes, Michigan State	D	Bruce Affleck, Denver
Doug Palazzari, Colorado College	F	Lorne Stamler, Michigan Tech
Steve Colp, Michigan State	F	Tom Ross, Michigan State
Mike Zuke, Michigan Tech	F	Ray Delorenzi, Notre Dame

== 1974 NHL Amateur Draft ==
Round	Pick	Player	College	Conference	NHL team
2	21	Bruce Affleck	Denver	WCHA	California Golden Seals
3	42	Pete LoPresti	Denver	WCHA	Minnesota North Stars
3	46	Dick Spannbauer	Minnesota	WCHA	Atlanta Flames
4	72	Bill Reed ^{‡}	Ohio State	Independent	Boston Bruins
5	75	Jim Warden	Michigan Tech	WCHA	California Golden Seals
5	79	Mike Zuke	Michigan Tech	WCHA	St. Louis Blues
5	81	John Taft	Wisconsin	WCHA	Detroit Red Wings
5	86	Dennis Olmstead	Wisconsin	WCHA	New York Rangers
6	93	Tom Sundberg ^{‡}	Minnesota	WCHA	California Golden Seals
6	96	John Sheridan	Minnesota	WCHA	Minnesota North Stars
6	98	Buzz Schneider	Minnesota	WCHA	Pittsburgh Penguins
6	99	Don Dufek	Michigan	WCHA	Detroit Red Wings
6	100	Bill Moen	Minnesota	WCHA	Atlanta Flames
6	101	Dave Given	Brown	ECAC Hockey	Buffalo Sabres
6	105	John Stewart	Bowling Green	CCHA	Montreal Canadiens
7	112	Dave Langevin	Minnesota–Duluth	WCHA	New York Islanders
7	118	Peter Brown	Boston University	ECAC Hockey	Atlanta Flames
7	123	Joe Micheletti	Minnesota	WCHA	Montreal Canadiens
7	124	Eddie Mio	Colorado College	WCHA	Chicago Black Hawks
8	135	Tom Lindskog	Michigan	WCHA	Atlanta Flames
8	140	Jamie Hislop	New Hampshire	ECAC Hockey	Montreal Canadiens
8	142	Steve Short ^{‡}	Wisconsin	WCHA	Philadelphia Flyers
8	143	Darryl Drader	North Dakota	WCHA	Boston Bruins
9	147	Marc Gaudreault	Lake Superior State	CCHA	Vancouver Canucks
9	158	Steve Colp	Michigan State	WCHA	Chicago Black Hawks
9	160	Peter Roberts ^{†}	Michigan Tech	WCHA	Boston Bruins
10	165	John Ahern	Brown	ECAC Hockey	St. Louis Blues
10	175	Peter Waselovich	North Dakota	WCHA	Boston Bruins
11	187	Cliff Cox	New Hampshire	ECAC Hockey	Montreal Canadiens
11	189	Scott Jessee	Michigan Tech	WCHA	Philadelphia Flyers
12	197	Lindsay Thomson	Denver	WCHA	Los Angeles Kings
12	199	Dave Lumley	New Hampshire	ECAC Hockey	Montreal Canadiens
13	204	Neil Smith ^{†}	Western Michigan	CCHA	New York Islanders
13	211	Brad Morrow	Minnesota	WCHA	Philadelphia Flyers
14	216	Bill Davis	Colgate	ECAC Hockey	Pittsburgh Penguins
14	219	Craig Arvidson	Minnesota–Duluth	WCHA	Philadelphia Flyers
15	221	Dave Otness	Wisconsin	WCHA	New York Islanders
16	226	Jim Murray	Michigan Tech	WCHA	New York Islanders
17	229	Mike Dibble	Wisconsin	WCHA	New York Islanders
20	239	Jim Mayer	Michigan Tech	WCHA	New York Rangers
21	241	Warren Miller	Minnesota	WCHA	New York Rangers
22	243	Kevin Walker	Cornell	ECAC Hockey	New York Rangers
23	245	Jim Warner ^{†}	Colorado College	WCHA	New York Rangers

† incoming freshman
‡ Reed, Short and Sundberg had left school before this season before.

== See also ==
- 1973–74 NCAA Division II men's ice hockey season
- 1973–74 NCAA Division III men's ice hockey season
