= Herb Brooks =

American ice hockey player and coach (1937–2003)

- Hockey Hall of Fame, 2006 (Builder)
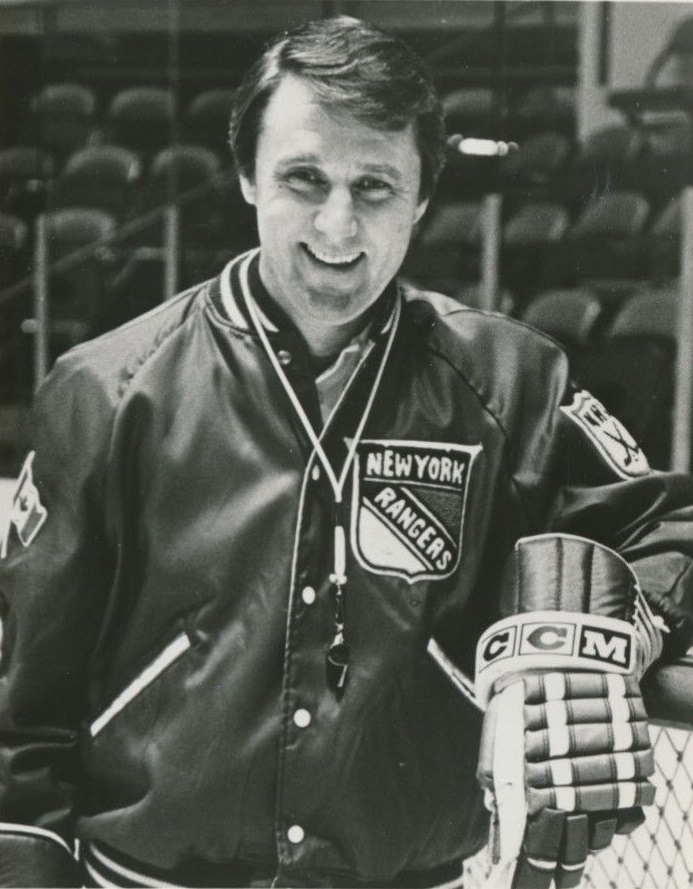
- Brooks with the New York Rangers in 1983
- Born: August 5, 1937 Saint Paul, Minnesota, U.S.
- Died: August 11, 2003 (aged 66) near Forest Lake, Minnesota, U.S.
- Coaching career

Biographical details
- Education: University of Minnesota

Playing career
- 1955–1959: Minnesota

Coaching career (HC unless noted)
- 1970–1971: Minnesota (assistant)
- 1971–1972: Minnesota Junior Stars
- 1972–1979: Minnesota
- 1980: US Olympic Team
- 1980–1981: HC Davos
- 1981–1985: New York Rangers
- 1986–1987: St. Cloud State
- 1987–1988: Minnesota North Stars
- 1991–1992: Utica Devils
- 1992–1993: New Jersey Devils
- 1995–2002: Pittsburgh Penguins (scout)
- 1998: France Olympic Team
- 1999–2000: Pittsburgh Penguins
- 2002: US Olympic Team
- 2002–2003: Pittsburgh Penguins (Dir. of Player Development)

Head coaching record
- Overall: 192–107–19 (.634) (NCAA); 219–222–66 (.497) (NHL)
- Tournaments: 8–1 (.889)

Accomplishments and honors

Championships
- 1974 Big Ten Champion; 1974 WCHA Tournament Champion; 1974 NCAA National Champion; 1975 Big Ten Champion; 1975 WCHA Regular Season Champion; 1975 WCHA Tournament Champion; 1976 WCHA Tournament Champion; 1976 NCAA National Champion; 1979 Big Ten Champion; 1979 WCHA Tournament Champion; 1979 NCAA National Champion; 1987 NCHA Regular Season Champion

Awards
- 1974 WCHA Coach of the Year
Medal record
Men's ice hockey
Representing the USA
World Championships
Bronze medal – third place	1962 United States	(Player)
Winter Olympics
Gold medal – first place	1980 Lake Placid	(Coach)
Silver medal – second place	2002 Salt Lake City	(Coach)

Herbert Paul Brooks (August 5, 1937 – August 11, 2003) was an American ice hockey player and coach. His most notable achievement came in 1980 as head coach of the gold medal-winning U.S. Olympic team at Lake Placid. Brooks' team upset the heavily favored Soviet team in a match that came to be known as the "Miracle on Ice".

Brooks also coached multiple National Hockey League (NHL) teams, and the French team at the 1998 Winter Olympics. He returned to coach the U.S. men's team to a silver medal at the 2002 Winter Olympics in Salt Lake City. When Brooks died in a car accident in 2003, he was the director of player personnel for the Pittsburgh Penguins.

Brooks was inducted into the United States Hockey Hall of Fame in 1990 and the IIHF Hall of Fame in 1999. He was honored posthumously with the Wayne Gretzky International Award in 2004 and inducted into the Hockey Hall of Fame in 2006.

== Early years ==
The 1958–59 Gopher Hockey Team, including Lou Nanne, Larry Smith, and Herb Brooks (#9, seated bottom left).

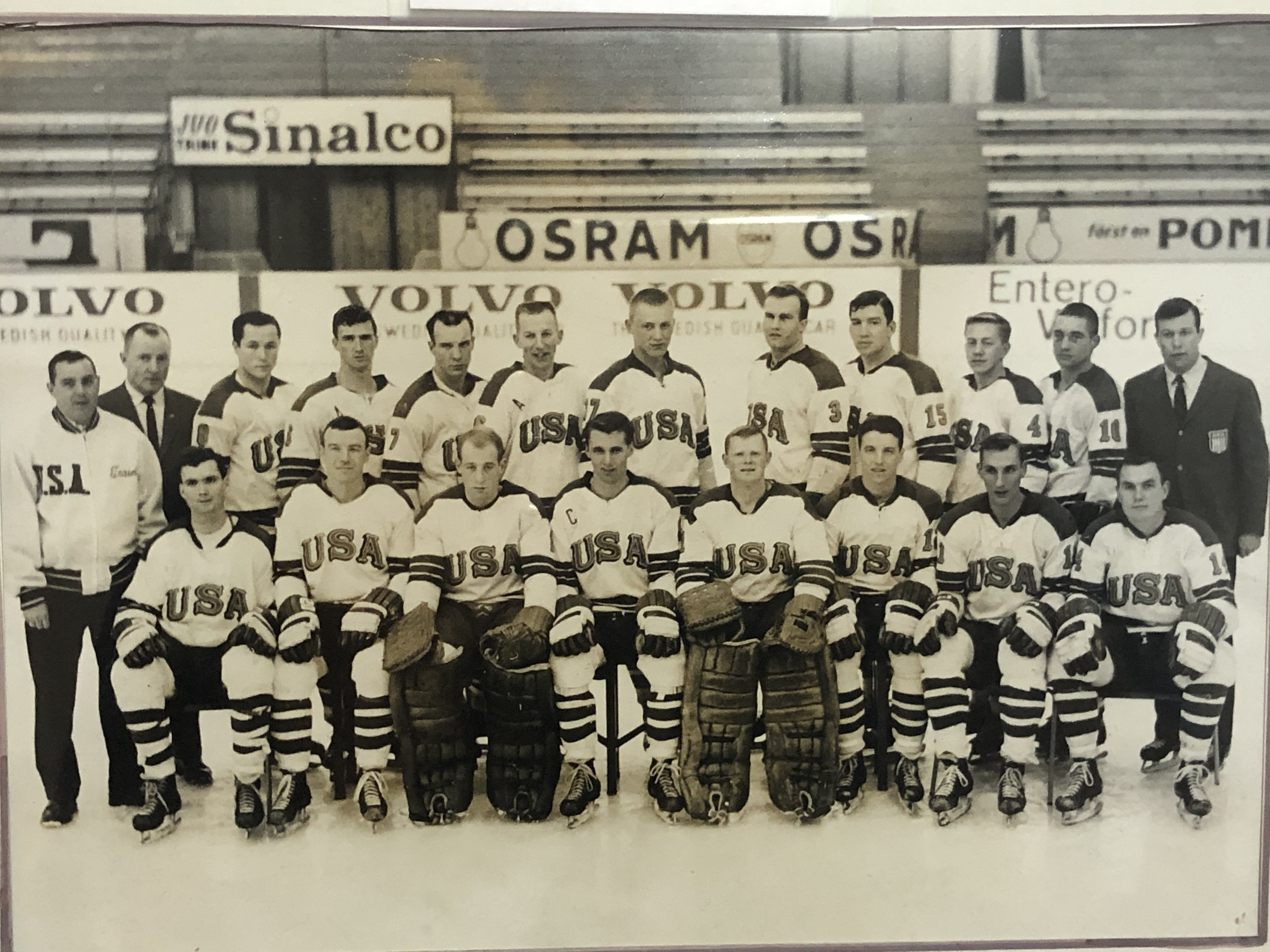
Brooks (seated in middle with C) was captain of the 1963 USA Hockey Team

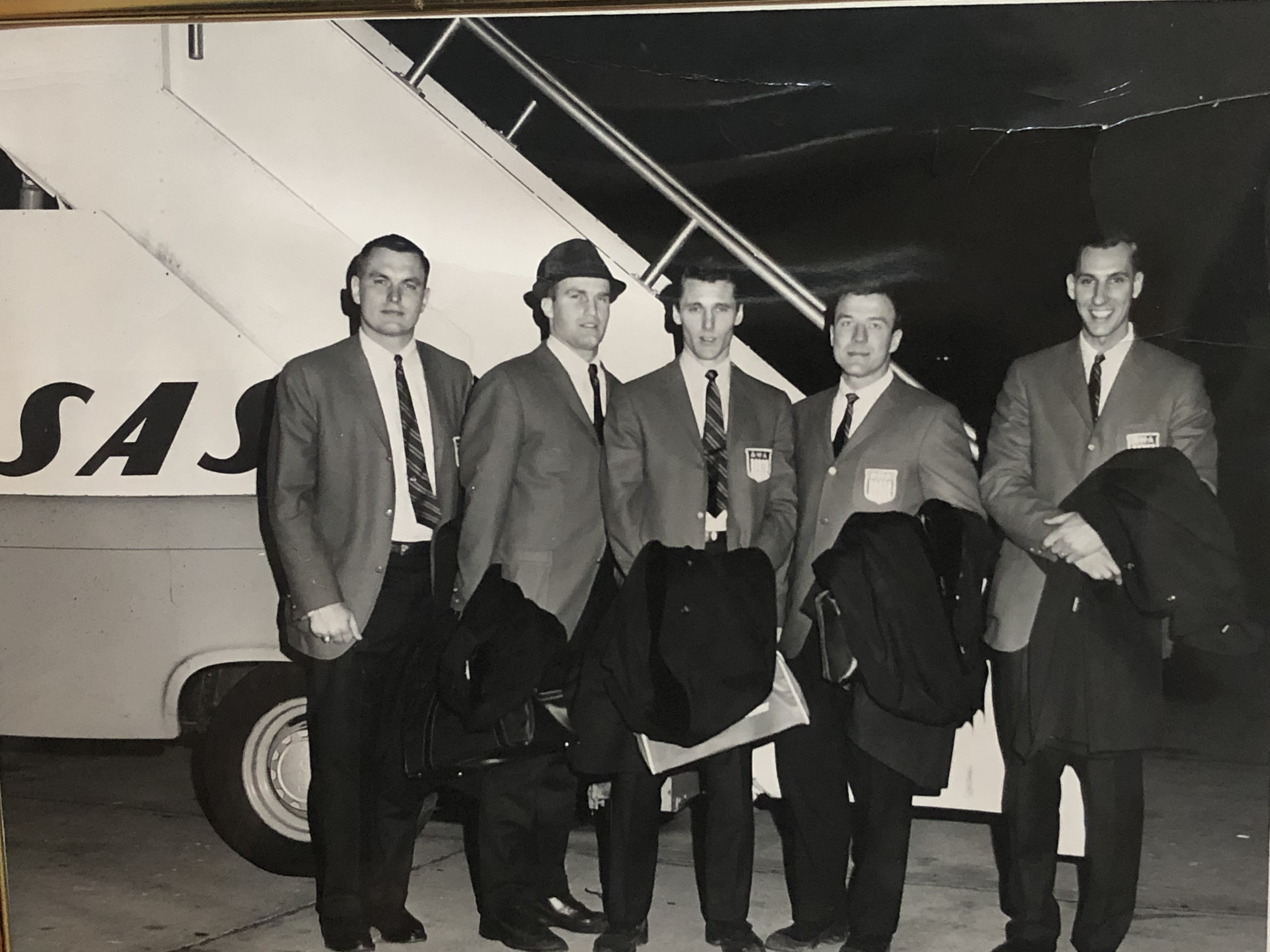
USA Hockey team members 1963 boarding plane with Herb Brooks (middle) and Larry Smith (right).

Brooks was born in Saint Paul, Minnesota, to Pauline and Herbert David Brooks. He attended Johnson High School, where his team won the 1955 state ice hockey championship.

Brooks continued his ice hockey career with the University of Minnesota Gophers from 1955 to 1959. He was a member of the 1960 Olympic team, only to become the last cut the week before the Games started. Three weeks later, Brooks sat at home with his father and watched the team he almost made win gold in Squaw Valley. Afterwards, Brooks went up to the coach, Jack Riley, and said, "Well, you must have made the right decision—you won". This humbling moment served as further motivation for Brooks, an already self-driven person.

From 1960 to 1970, Brooks set a record by playing for the U.S. national team eight times, including the 1964 and 1968 Olympic teams. While playing for the Rochester Mustangs in the United States Hockey League in the 1961–62 season, he formed part of the highest-scoring forward line in USHL history at the time, along with Bill Reichart and Ken Johannson.

== Careers ==
=== Coaching career ===
After retiring as a player, Brooks first tried his hand at selling insurance. Lou Nanne, who played with Brooks on the 1968 team for the United States, helped recruit Brooks to become a coach. He was brought on to coach the freshmen at his alma mater, the Minnesota Golden Gophers in 1970. He coached the Minnesota Junior Stars from 1971 to 1972. Brooks was hired as head coach of Minnesota in 1972. He would lead them to three NCAA championship titles in 1974, 1976, and 1979. Nine members of the 1979 team that won the championship in March would be recruited for the 1980 Olympic team, which Brooks was already recruited to coach.

Brooks had been hired due to lobbying from Nanne and USA Hockey executive Walter Bush (after Jack Parker declined the position). Hand-picking his team, he named several of his Minnesota players to the team, as well as several from their rivals, Boston University and the University of Wisconsin-Madison. To compete with the Soviet Union team specifically, Brooks stressed peak conditioning, believing that one of the reasons the Soviet team had dominated international competition was that many of their opponents were exhausted by the third period. Brooks got Jack Blatherwick to work with him on testing the team in conditioning, as he had done for Brooks with testing the 1978–79 Minnesota Golden Gophers team on the ice and in a laboratory setting. The two worked on developing practice plans and drills to get the team in the best condition possible. Then, working with team doctor George Nagobads, shifts would be timed on the bench to make sure no one would be on the ice longer than 40 seconds to keep them ready to endure the Soviets in crunch time. The schedule for the team would be 63 games long, considerably longer than previous US Olympic teams. One particular game inspired a famed exercise when the team had a 3–3 tie with Norway. Brooks had his team do a sprint from the goal line to the first blue line and then back before then getting them to go to the red line and back, then making them go from the goal line to the second blue line before finally having them go from the goal line to the other goal line, which was called a "Herbie". It lasted for over an hour, even after the rink lights were turned off. The practice of doing a "Herbie" was not new to Minnesota players, as the team would do the practice at least once every two weeks, usually on the Monday after playing games on the weekend. The schedule saw them play the Soviet team two weeks before the Olympics, which saw the U.S. lose 10–3. The American team went into the February 22 game for the Olympics having not lost once (with a tie to Sweden). They were tied 2–2 after one period and trailing 3–2 entering the third period before rallying with two unanswered goals to win 4–3. The victory was labeled by Sports Illustrated in 1999 as the greatest moment in 20th century sports. Two days later, the U.S. beat Finland to formally clinch the gold medal.

After his team's Olympic gold medal win, Brooks moved to Switzerland to coach HC Davos in the National League A. However he resigned from this position in January 1981, only six months after being hired, with the team having a poor record and Brooks facing criticism for what were described as "rough practices".

From 1981 to 1985, he coached in the National Hockey League for the New York Rangers, where he became the first American-born coach in Rangers' team history to win 100 games. Brooks was fired on January 21, 1985, by the Rangers, where he was replaced by general manager Craig Patrick (his assistant for the 1980 Olympic Team) after the team was 15-22-8 and struggling in the Patrick Division alongside strife with team captain Barry Beck. In July 1985, after failed negotiations with the Minnesota North Stars, Brooks stated that he was through with coaching and would take a job as a national sales representative for Jostens, a memorabilia manufacturer.

Brooks was offered the position to coach at St. Cloud State University, an NCAA Division II school (as presided by university president Brendan McDonald, who had ideas of elevating the program to Division I in the future) in May 1986 and turned it down initially. However, he was convinced by John Mariucci (head coach at Minnesota for Brooks in the late 1950s) to take the position because Mariucci (who died the following year) felt Brooks could get the school to think about elevating itself to Division I in the future; at the time, the state of Minnesota had just two Division I programs for hockey. Brooks took the job with the condition that the team would elevate itself from its status at NCAA Division II to Division I level along with start work to try to build a new arena. Brooks spearheaded funding for an arena with sheets of ice in Olympic size in his one season with the team. With practices dedicated to the power play and penalty kill on a constant basis as opposed to the norm of dedicating to it once a week, the team won 25 games, a team record for over a decade and won the Northern Collegiate Hockey Association tournament to reach the NCAA Division II Tournament for the first time, where they went all the way to the Third Place game; Brooks later called it the most enjoyable year he had had in coaching. Brooks left the team after the season, with his assistant Craig Dahl stepping in as head coach, where he would coach for the next 18 years before being succeeded by Bob Motzko, who was also an assistant to Brooks at St. Cloud State. The team would play as a Division I independent for the next three seasons and move to a new arena in 1989, which saw them reach the NCAA Division I Tournament for the first time in school history.

Brooks returned to the NHL to coach the Minnesota North Stars in 1987 on a two-year contract. His hiring by the North Stars in 1987 was the last time a college coach was selected to coach an NHL team until North Dakota coach Dave Hakstol was tapped to coach the Philadelphia Flyers in May 2015. However, management fired him in the summer of 1988 after one season, which both saw them finish as the worst team in the league but also finish one point out of a playoff spot due to the playoff structure that had them narrowly behind the Toronto Maple Leafs for the fourth spot of the Norris Division.

Brooks was hired to coach the Utica Devils of the American Hockey League on July 11, 1991, which raised speculation he could be tapped to coach the NHL affiliate New Jersey Devils (who had four head coaches since the 1987–88 season) in the future. This came to pass on June 5, 1992, when he was announced as the new head coach of the NHL Devils to replace Tom McVie. He stressed a need for youth and speed to build a winner but argued with players such as Claude Lemieux, who was both the leading scorer on the team and one that Brooks labeled midway through the season as a "cancer". A perception of having little support from general manager Lou Lamoriello and owner John McMullen did not help matters for Brooks. The team won 40 games and finished tied for third place in the division but lost to Pittsburgh in five games. Despite a three-year contract, Brooks resigned on May 31, 1993, citing differences over what the team needed to get to the next step in the playoffs; two seasons later, the Devils won the Stanley Cup.

After leaving the Devils, Brooks became a scout for the Penguins. Twenty-five games into the 1999–2000 season in December 1999, Brooks was hired by general manager Craig Patrick to replace Kevin Constantine as head coach of the Penguins. On January 13, 2000, Brooks confronted Colorado Avalanche announcer John Kelly for suggesting that Matthew Barnaby faked an injury after being hit by Alexei Gusarov with 27 seconds left. He was suspended two games for that confrontation on January 18, having been suspended indefinitely since January 15. The night before Brooks got suspended, Gusarov was suspended two games for the hit. Brooks stepped down after finishing the season to be a scout again while Ivan Hlinka was named the new coach in 2000. In 2002, Brooks turned down an offer to potentially coach the New York Rangers. Instead, Brooks accepted an offer to serve as the Director of Player Development of the Penguins, which he served until his death.

Brooks also coached two more Olympic hockey teams: Team France at the 1998 Winter Olympics in Nagano, and the U.S. hockey team again at the 2002 Winter Olympics in Salt Lake City. The bringing in of Brooks in 2001 to coach the team along with Patrick as general manager saw a handful of players retained from the 1998 team, which had lost three of four games. Brooks had asked the NHL to cancel its 2002 All-Star Game to get days for players to practice before the Olympics, but this was denied by the league, which gave the teams one day to work together before the tournament. The 2002 team defeated the Russians in the semi-finals on the road to a silver medal, losing in the gold medal game to Canada. The U.S. win over Russia came exactly 22 years to the day after the famous 'Miracle on Ice' game.

Brooks was inducted into the United States Hockey Hall of Fame in 1990, and the IIHF Hall of Fame in 1999. He was honored posthumously with the Wayne Gretzky International Award in 2004, and inducted into the Hockey Hall of Fame in 2006.

=== Broadcasting career ===
After he was fired by the Minnesota North Stars, Brooks then spent two years doing TV color commentary for SportsChannel America alongside Jiggs McDonald.

== Personal life ==
Brooks married Patricia Lane, known as Patti, in 1965. They had two children, Dan and Kelly.

== Death and legacy ==
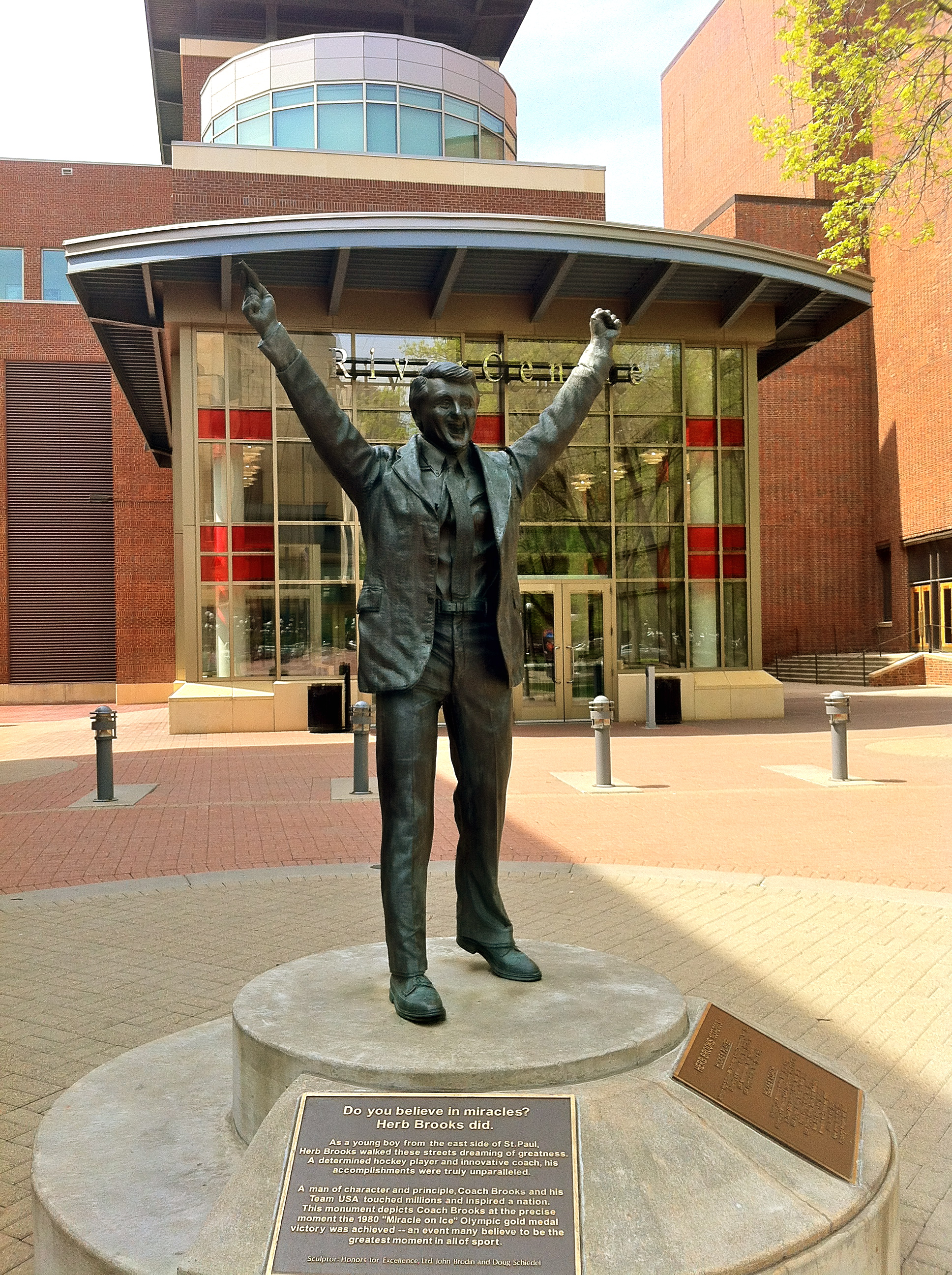
A statue of Brooks outside RiverCentre, in Saint Paul

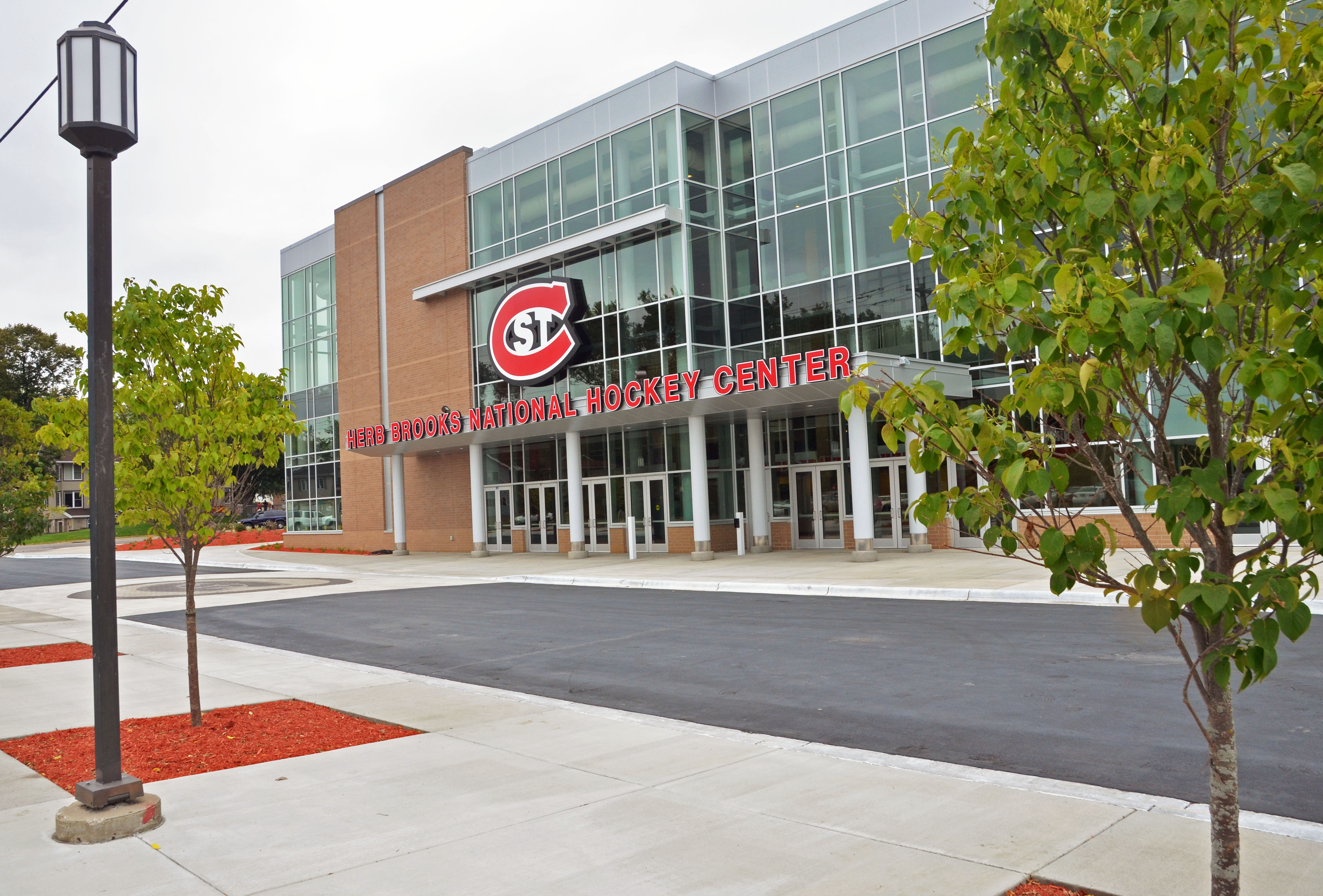
The Herb Brooks National Hockey Center was named in honor of Brooks in 2013

On the afternoon of August 11, 2003, six days after his 66th birthday, Brooks died in a single-car accident on Interstate 35 near Forest Lake, Minnesota. It is believed that he fell asleep behind the wheel before the accident, and neither drugs nor alcohol was responsible. Brooks was not wearing his seat belt at the time of the crash and, according to the Minnesota State Patrol, it is likely he would have survived the crash if he had been.

George Nagobads was the team physician when Brooks coached the US men's national team and Minnesota Golden Gophers men's ice hockey, and described Brooks by saying, "I really appreciated the way Herbie always treated the players, and for me, he was just like my son."

In 2004, Disney released a film about the 1980 Olympic team called Miracle featuring Kurt Russell playing the part of Brooks. Karl Malden had previously played Brooks in a 1981 television film called Miracle on Ice. Brooks served as a consultant for the Disney film during principal photography, which was completed shortly before his death. At the end of the movie there is a dedication to Brooks. It states, "He never saw it. He lived it."

On the 25th anniversary of the Miracle on Ice, the Olympic ice arena in Lake Placid, New York, where the United States won the gold medal, was renamed Herb Brooks Arena. A new statue of Brooks was christened in downtown Saint Paul, Minnesota in 2017 to replace a smaller one that was relocated to be in front of Schwan Super Rink (a place for which Brooks was a leading advocate) in Blaine, Minnesota. The Herb Brooks Award is awarded at the conclusion of the Minnesota State High School League's state hockey tournament to "the most qualified hockey player in the state tournament who strongly represents the values, characteristics, and traits that defined Herb Brooks."

The Herb Brooks Training Center is located at Blaine, Minnesota.

The National Hockey Center at St. Cloud State University in Minnesota was renamed for Brooks in April 2013. In 2006, Brooks was posthumously inducted into the Hockey Hall of Fame in the Builders' category. The inscription reads: "A man of passion and dedication, Herb Brooks inspired a generation of Americans to pursue any and all dreams."

In May 2026, a ring given to Herb Brooks in 1980 was sold at Heritage Auctions for US$549,000.

== Brooksisms ==
Brooks's original expressions were known by his players as "Brooksisms", some of which were included in Miracle. According to Olympians John Harrington, Dave Silk, and Mike Eruzione, these are a few.

- "You were born to be a player. You were meant to be here. This moment is yours."
- "Write your own book instead of reading someone else's book about success."
- "I've always said that coaching is like being a king. It prepares you for absolutely nothing."

== Head coaching record ==
=== College ===
Record table
Season	Team	Overall	Conference	Standing	Postseason
Minnesota Golden Gophers (WCHA / Big Ten) (1972–1979)
1972–73	Minnesota	15–16–3	12–13–3 / 5–4–3	6th / 3rd	WCHA First Round (WIS)
1973–74	Minnesota	22–11–6	14–9–5 / 5–4–3	2nd / t-1st	NCAA National Champion (MTU)
1974–75	Minnesota	31–10–1	24–8–0 / 8–4–0	1st / 1st	NCAA Runner-Up (MTU)
1975–76	Minnesota	28–14–2	18–13–1 / 4–8–0	3rd / 3rd	NCAA National Champion (MTU)
1976–77	Minnesota	17–21–3	13–16–3 / 5–7–0	7th / 3rd	WCHA Semifinals (UND)
1977–78	Minnesota	22–14–2	18–13–1 / 6–6–0	4th / 3rd	WCHA First Round (CC)
1978–79	Minnesota	32–11–1	20–11–1 / 10–2–0	2nd / 1st	NCAA National Champion (NMU)
Minnesota:		167–97–18	119–83–14 / 43–35–6		
St. Cloud State Huskies (NCHA) (1986–1987)
1986–87	St. Cloud State	25–10–1	13–6–1	t-1st	NCAA Third Place Game (Win) (BSU)
St. Cloud State:		25–10–1	13–6–1		
Total:		192–107–19			
National champion Postseason invitational champion Conference regular season champion Conference regular season and conference tournament champion Division regular season champion Division regular season and conference tournament champion Conference tournament champion

†Minnesota played jointly in the Big Ten and WCHA from 1959 to 1981

=== NHL ===
Note: G = Games, W = Wins, L = Losses, T = Ties, Pts = Points

Team	Year	Regular Season						Postseason
Team	Year	G	W	L	T	Pts	Finish	Result
NYR	1981–82	80	39	27	14	92	2nd in Patrick	Lost in Division Finals (NYI)
NYR	1982–83	80	35	35	10	80	4th in Patrick	Lost in Division Finals (NYI)
NYR	1983–84	80	42	29	9	93	4th in Patrick	Lost in Division Semifinals (NYI)
NYR	1984–85	45	15	22	8	(38)	(fired)	—
MIN	1987–88	80	19	48	13	51	5th in Norris	Missed playoffs
NJ	1992–93	84	40	37	7	87	4th in Patrick	Lost in Division Semifinals (PIT)
PIT	1999–2000	58	29	24	5	(63)	3rd in Atlantic	Lost in Conference Semifinals (PHI)
Total		507	219	222	66	504		5 playoff appearances

=== Other leagues ===
Note: GC = Games coached, W = Wins, L = Losses, T = Ties, OL = Overtime loss, Pts = Points, Pct = Winning percentage

Season	Team	League	GC	W	L	T	OL	Pts	Pct
1980	USA Olympic Men's Team	IIHF	Gold Medal
1980–81	HC Davos	Swiss-A	28	11	16	1	—	23	0.411
1991–92	Utica Devils	AHL	80	34	40	6	—	74	0.463
1998	France Olympic Men's Team	IIHF	11th-place finish
2002	USA Olympic Men's Team	IIHF	Silver Medal

== See also ==
- List of members of the United States Hockey Hall of Fame
- Inspirational/motivational instructors/mentors portrayed in films

Sporting positions
Preceded by Fred Shero	Head coach of the New York Rangers; 1981–85	Succeeded by Craig Patrick
Preceded by Glen Sonmor	Head coach of the Minnesota North Stars; 1987–88	Succeeded by Pierre Page
Preceded by Tom McVie	Head coach of the New Jersey Devils; 1992–93	Succeeded by Jacques Lemaire
Preceded by Kevin Constantine	Head coach of the Pittsburgh Penguins; 1999–2000	Succeeded by Ivan Hlinka
Awards and achievements
Preceded by Lefty Smith	WCHA Coach of the Year; 1973–74	Succeeded by Jeff Sauer
Preceded by Charlie Holt	Hobey Baker Legends of College Hockey Award; 2011	Succeeded by Fernie Flaman
