= Mike Zuke =

Canadian ice hockey player (born 1954)

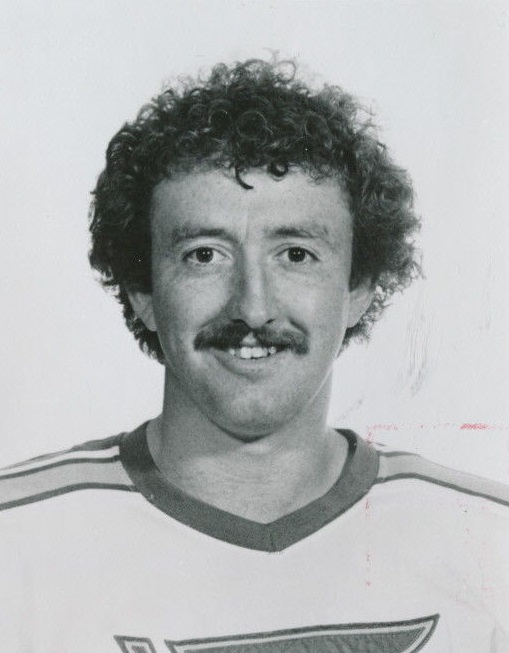
- Born: April 16, 1954 (age 71) Sault Ste. Marie, Ontario, Canada
- Height: 6 ft 0 in (183 cm)
- Weight: 180 lb (82 kg; 12 st 12 lb)
- Position: Centre
- Shot: Right
- Played for: Indianapolis Racers; Edmonton Oilers (WHA); St. Louis Blues; Hartford Whalers
- NHL draft: 79th overall, 1974; St. Louis Blues
- WHA draft: 47th overall, 1974; Indianapolis Racers
- Playing career: 1977–1986

Michael Zuke (born 16 April 1954) is a Canadian former professional ice hockey centreman who played eight seasons in the NHL, between 1978 and 1986.

Zuke was drafted 79th overall by the St. Louis Blues in the 1974 NHL amateur draft. He played 455 career NHL games, scoring 86 goals and 196 assists for 282 points. Zuke's father was a local mail carrier and hockey coach who helped produce great NHL players (e.g., Ron Francis).

Zuke also played NCAA hockey for Michigan Tech and is the all-time scoring leader with 133 goals and 177 assists for a total of 310 points in 163 games played in his four years there. Zuke helped the Huskies win the national championship in 1975. He leads the all-time list by an impressive 97 points. He also holds the all-time high for goals and assists respectively.

== Career statistics ==
=== Regular season and playoffs ===
			Regular season					Playoffs
Season	Team	League	GP	G	A	Pts	PIM	GP	G	A	Pts	PIM
1971–72	Sault Ste. Marie Greyhounds	NOJHL	—	—	—	—	—	—	—	—	—	—
1972–73	Michigan Tech Huskies	WCHA	38	23	30	53	20	—	—	—	—	—
1973–74	Michigan Tech Huskies	WCHA	40	28	47	75	38	—	—	—	—	—
1974–75	Michigan Tech Huskies	WCHA	42	35	43	78	20	—	—	—	—	—
1975–76	Michigan Tech Huskies	WCHA	43	47	57	104	24	—	—	—	—	—
1976–77	Indianapolis Racers	WHA	15	3	4	7	2	—	—	—	—	—
1976–77	Mohawk Valley Comets	NAHL	48	42	29	71	33	—	—	—	—	—
1977–78	Edmonton Oilers	WHA	71	23	34	57	47	5	2	3	5	0
1978–79	St. Louis Blues	NHL	34	9	17	26	18	—	—	—	—	—
1978–79	Salt Lake Golden Eagles	CHL	29	9	13	22	4	—	—	—	—	—
1979–80	St. Louis Blues	NHL	69	22	42	64	30	3	0	0	0	2
1980–81	St. Louis Blues	NHL	74	24	44	68	57	11	4	5	9	4
1981–82	St. Louis Blues	NHL	76	13	40	53	41	8	1	1	2	2
1982–83	St. Louis Blues	NHL	43	8	16	24	14	4	1	0	1	4
1982–83	Salt Lake Golden Eagles	CHL	13	7	8	15	0	—	—	—	—	—
1983–84	Hartford Whalers	NHL	75	6	23	29	36	—	—	—	—	—
1984–85	Hartford Whalers	NHL	67	4	12	16	12	—	—	—	—	—
1985–86	Hartford Whalers	NHL	17	0	2	2	12	—	—	—	—	—
WHA totals			86	26	38	64	49	5	2	3	5	0
NHL totals			455	86	196	282	220	26	6	6	12	12

== Personal life ==
Zuke presently owns and operates Mike Zuke Enterprises in St. Louis, an apparel, screen printing and embroidery business.

== Awards and honours ==
Award	Year
All-WCHA First Team	1973–74
AHCA West All-American	1973–74
All-WCHA Second Team	1974–75
All-WCHA First Team	1975–76
AHCA West All-American	1975–76

Awards and achievements
Preceded by Alan Hangsleben	WCHA Freshman of the Year; 1972–73	Succeeded by Brian Walsh
Preceded by Mike Polich/Tom Ross	WCHA Most Valuable Player; 1975–76	Succeeded by Brian Walsh
