= 1974 ECAC Hockey men's ice hockey tournament =

1974 ECAC Men's ice hockey tournament
- Dates: March 5–9, 1974
- Teams: 8
- Finals site: Boston Garden; Boston, Massachusetts
- Champions: Boston University (2nd title)
- Winning coach: Jack Parker (1st title)
- MVP: Ed Walsh (Boston University)
- ECAC Men's Ice Hockey Tournaments

The 1974 ECAC Hockey Men's Ice Hockey Tournament was the 13th tournament in league history. It was played between March 5 and March 9, 1974. Quarterfinal games were played at home team campus sites, while the 'final four' games were played at the Boston Garden in Boston, Massachusetts. By reaching the championship game, both Boston University and Harvard received invitations to participate in the 1974 NCAA Division I Men's Ice Hockey Tournament.

== Format ==
The tournament featured three rounds of play, all of which were single-elimination. The top eight teams, based on winning percentage, qualified to participate in the tournament. In the quarterfinals the first seed and eighth seed, the second seed and seventh seed, the third seed and sixth seed and the fourth seed and fifth seed played against one another. In the semifinals, the highest seed plays the lowest remaining seed while the two remaining teams play with the winners advancing to the championship game and the losers advancing to the third place game.

== Conference standings ==
Note: GP = Games played; W = Wins; L = Losses; T = Ties; Pct. = Winning percentage; GF = Goals for; GA = Goals against

1973–74 ECAC Hockey standings
	Conference							Overall					
	GP	W	L	T	Pct.	GF	GA	GP	W	L	T	GF	GA
New Hampshire†	20	15	5	0	.750	113	71	31	22	9	0	171	105
Harvard	21	15	6	0	.714	166	109	29	17	11	1	155	113
Boston University*	20	14	6	0	.700	167	89	31	23	8	0	190	95
Cornell	20	13	6	1	.675	135	108	27	19	7	1	146	110
St. Lawrence	17	9	7	1	.559	79	83	28	12	15	1	125	123
Dartmouth	22	12	10	0	.545	93	104	25	13	11	1	99	100
Providence	19	9	9	1	.500	83	103	26	14	11	1	115	113
Rensselaer	17	8	9	0	.471	101	116	30	14	15	1	141	142
Clarkson	21	9	11	1	.452	70	89	27	12	14	1	97	115
Pennsylvania	21	9	12	0	.429	67	71	24	10	14	0	75	87
Boston College	19	8	11	0	.421	89	98	28	16	12	0	137	138
Northeastern	19	7	10	2	.421	74	88	27	10	13	4	116	124
Brown	18	7	11	0	.389	63	69	23	10	13	0	87	86
Princeton	20	7	12	1	.375	62	100	24	9	14	1	87	117
Yale	18	5	13	0	.278	60	91	24	8	16	0	80	114
Colgate	20	5	14	1	.275	73	104	28	11	16	1	122	133
Championship: Boston University † indicates conference regular season champion * indicates conference tournament champion

== Bracket ==
Teams are reseeded after the first round

Quarterfinals; March 5
1	New Hampshire	6
8	Rensselaer	7*
2	Harvard	9
7	Providence	3
3	Boston University	8
6	Dartmouth	0
4	Cornell	5
5	St. Lawrence	3

Semifinals; March 8
2	Harvard	7
8	Rensselaer	2
3	Boston University	7
4	Cornell	3

Championship; March 9
2	Harvard	2
3	Boston University	4
Third Place
4	Cornell	8
8	Rensselaer	2

Note: * denotes overtime period(s)

=== Quarterfinals ===
==== (1) New Hampshire vs. (8) Rensselaer ====
March 5	New Hampshire	6 – 7	OT	Rensselaer	Snively Arena

==== (2) Harvard vs. (7) Providence ====
March 5	Harvard	9 – 3	Providence	Donald C. Watson Rink

==== (3) Boston University vs. (6) Dartmouth ====
March 5	Boston University	8 – 0	Dartmouth	Walter Brown Arena

==== (4) Cornell vs. (5) St. Lawrence ====
March 5	Cornell	5 – 3	St. Lawrence	Lynah Rink

=== Semifinals ===
==== (2) Harvard vs. (8) Rensselaer ====
March 8	Harvard	7 – 2	Rensselaer	Boston Garden

==== (3) Boston University vs. (4) Cornell ====
March 8	Boston University	7 – 3	Cornell	Boston Garden

=== Third Place ===
==== (4) Cornell vs. (8) Rensselaer ====
March 9	Cornell	8 – 2	Rensselaer	Boston Garden

=== Championship ===
==== (2) Harvard vs. (3) Boston University ====
March 9	Harvard	2 – 4	Boston University	Boston Garden

== Tournament awards ==
=== All-Tournament Team ===
None

=== MOP ===
- Ed Walsh (Boston University)
