= Wadena-Deer Creek Senior High School =

Location
- 600 Colfax Ave SW; Wadena, Minnesota 56482; United States; 46.4419°N 95.1469°W

Information
- Type: Public Secondary
- Established: 1885
- Principal: Tyler Church
- Teaching staff: 21.51 (FTE)
- Grades: 5-12
- Enrollment: 480 (2023-2024)
- Student to teacher ratio: 22.32
- Colors: Royal blue and gold
- Song: The Victors
- Nickname: Wolverines
- Website: www.wdc2155.k12.mn.us

Wadena-Deer Creek Senior High School (WDC) is a four-year public high school located in Wadena, Minnesota, United States. WDC is a cooperative school district for the communities of Wadena, Deer Creek and Bluffton. 646 students are currently enrolled in grades 5–12. The student to teacher ratio at Wadena-Deer Creek is 15:1 and the student body make up is 51% male and 49% female. The total minority enrollment is 7%.

== Academics ==
Wadena-Deer Creek High School is on a period schedule. The school year consists of 171 student days, divided into four quarters. Each day consists of seven periods, each of which are 52 minutes long. In 2011 Adequate Yearly Progress was met in reading, but not mathematics or special education. 70% of students were deemed proficient in reading and 19% were deemed proficient in math. Class sizes range from 15 to 25 students.

== Tornado ==
On June 17, 2010, the previous 7 -12 high school building was destroyed in an EF4 tornado. Classes were relocated to a local community college while construction started on a new building due to open fall 2012 on the same site. The new building houses both the middle school and high school and contains two levels with two gyms, a lecture hall, a safe room and an elevated running track.
