= Lorne Stamler =

Canadian ice hockey player

- Born: August 9, 1951 (age 75) Winnipeg, Manitoba, Canada
- Height: 6 ft 0 in (183 cm)
- Weight: 190 lb (86 kg; 13 st 8 lb)
- Position: Forward
- Shot: Left
- Played for: Los Angeles Kings; Toronto Maple Leafs; Winnipeg Jets
- NHL draft: 103rd overall, 1971; Los Angeles Kings
- Playing career: 1974–1984

Lorne Alexander Joseph Stamler (born August 9, 1951) is a Canadian former professional ice hockey forward who played 116 games in the National Hockey League for the Los Angeles Kings, Toronto Maple Leafs, and Winnipeg Jets between 1976 and 1980. The rest of his career, which lasted from 1974 to 1984, was spent in the minor leagues.

== Career statistics ==
=== Regular season and playoffs ===
			Regular season					Playoffs
Season	Team	League	GP	G	A	Pts	PIM	GP	G	A	Pts	PIM
1968–69	Toronto Marlboros	OHA	25	2	3	5	14	1	0	0	0	0
1969–70	Toronto Marlboros	OHA	51	6	12	18	32	18	4	7	11	24
1970–71	Michigan Tech	WCHA	32	8	5	13	8	—	—	—	—	—
1971–72	Michigan Tech	WCHA	32	20	12	32	20	—	—	—	—	—
1972–73	Michigan Tech	WCHA	37	11	17	28	22	—	—	—	—	—
1973–74	Michigan Tech	WCHA	39	26	30	56	36	—	—	—	—	—
1974–75	Springfield Indians	AHL	43	16	9	25	5	17	5	8	13	8
1975–76	Fort Worth Texans	CHL	76	33	33	66	12	—	—	—	—	—
1976–77	Los Angeles Kings	NHL	7	2	1	3	2	—	—	—	—	—
1976–77	Fort Worth Texans	CHL	48	19	21	40	12	5	4	2	6	0
1977–78	Los Angeles Kings	NHL	2	0	0	0	0	—	—	—	—	—
1977–78	Springfield Indians	AHL	70	18	34	52	4	—	—	—	—	—
1978–79	Toronto Maple Leafs	NHL	45	4	3	7	2	—	—	—	—	—
1978–79	New Brunswick Hawks	AHL	14	9	1	10	4	5	2	1	3	9
1979–80	Winnipeg Jets	NHL	62	8	7	15	12	—	—	—	—	—
1979–80	Tulsa Oilers	CHL	6	8	3	11	0	—	—	—	—	—
1980–81	Indianapolis Checkers	CHL	42	7	6	13	25	—	—	—	—	—
1981–82	Indianapolis Checkers	CHL	53	5	7	12	8	13	4	2	6	0
1982–83	Indianapolis Checkers	CHL	38	4	4	8	0	13	2	0	2	0
1983–84	Indianapolis Checkers	CHL	15	3	2	5	0	—	—	—	—	—
CHL totals			278	79	76	155	57	31	10	4	14	0
NHL totals			116	14	11	25	16	—	—	—	—	—

== Awards and honors ==
Award	Year
All-WCHA Second Team	1973–74
