= John Sheridan (ice hockey) =

American ice hockey player

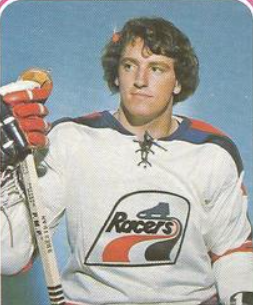
- Sheridan in 1975 card
- Born: September 18, 1954 (age 71) Minneapolis, Minnesota, U.S.
- Height: 6 ft 1 in (185 cm)
- Weight: 190 lb (86 kg; 13 st 8 lb)
- Position: Center
- Shot: Left
- Played for: Indianapolis Racers (WHA); Mohawk Valley Comets (NAHL); Fort Wayne Komets (IHL); Milwaukee Admirals (IHL); Long Beach Sharks/Rockets (PHL); Utica Mohawks (NEHL); Jersey/Hampton Aces (NEHL); Mohawk Valley Stars (ACHL)
- NHL draft: 96th overall, 1974; Minnesota North Stars
- WHA draft: 92nd overall, 1974; Indianapolis Racers
- Playing career: 1974–1982

John Sheridan (born September 18, 1954 in Minneapolis, Minnesota) is a retired professional ice hockey player who played 69 games in the World Hockey Association. He played for the Indianapolis Racers. Sheridan was selected by the Minnesota North Stars in the sixth round (96th overall) of the 1974 NHL Amateur Draft and by the Indianapolis Racers in the seventh round (92nd overall) of the 1974 WHA Amateur Draft after his freshman year at University of Minnesota.

Sheridan also played in other various professional leagues, including the NAHL, IHL, PHL, NEHL/EHL, and the ACHL until his retirement in 1982. Following his retirement, he helped create Mohawk Valley Community College's first junior college hockey program in Utica, NY. He was their first coach from 1983 through 1991. His record there was 59–66–0.

Sheridan currently resides in the Greater Cleveland area and coached the Aurora High hockey team for a number of years.

== Career statistics ==
=== Regular season and playoffs ===
			Regular season					Playoffs
Season	Team	League	GP	G	A	Pts	PIM	GP	G	A	Pts	PIM
1973–74	University of Minnesota	WCHA		Statistics Unavailable
1974–75	Indianapolis Racers	WHA	58	17	11	28	20	—	—	—	—	—
1974–75	Mohawk Valley Comets	NAHL	15	8	7	15	22	—	—	—	—	—
1975–76	Fort Wayne Komets	IHL	20	8	4	12	6	9	3	4	7	6
1975–76	Indianapolis Racers	WHA	11	1	2	3	0	—	—	—	—	—
1975–76	Mohawk Valley Comets	NAHL	37	27	22	49	52	—	—	—	—	—
1976–77	Mohawk Valley Comets	NAHL	40	24	29	53	28	5	5	2	7	12
1977–78	Long Beach Sharks/Rockets	PHL	38	15	18	33	32	—	—	—	—	—
1977–78	Milwaukee Admirals	IHL	26	4	11	15	6	—	—	—	—	—
1978–79	Utica Mohawks	NEHL	40	18	21	39	16	—	—	—	—	—
1978–79	Jersey/Hampton Aces	NEHL	14	4	3	7	2	—	—	—	—	—
1979–80	Hampton Aces	EHL	11	2	3	5	6	—	—	—	—	—
1981–82	Mohawk Valley Stars	ACHL	33	14	15	29	30	13	4	6	10	2
WHA totals			69	18	13	31	20	—	—	—	—	—
