= List of Minnesota North Stars players =

This is a list of players who have played at least one game for the Minnesota North Stars of the National Hockey League (NHL). This list does not include players for the Dallas Stars 1993 to present day or any merged from the Oakland Seals 1967 to 1970, California (Golden) Seals 1970 to 1976 and Cleveland Barons 1976 to 1978.

== Key ==
- Hockey Hall of Famer

Abbreviations
HHOF	Elected to the Hockey Hall of Fame
C	Center
D	Defenseman
L	Left wing
R	Right wing

Goaltenders
W	Wins
L	Losses
T	Ties
OTL ^{a}	Overtime losses
SO	Shutouts
GAA	Goals against average
SV%	Save percentage

Skaters
GP	Games played
G	Goals
A	Assists
Pts	Points
PIM	Penalty minutes

== Skaters ==
			Regular season					Playoffs				
Player	Position	Years	GP	G	A	Pts	PIM	GP	G	A	Pts	PIM
Keith Acton	C	1983–1988	343	87	148	235	380	29	8	14	22	24
Chris Ahrens	D	1973–1978	52	0	3	3	84	1	0	0	0	0
Kent-Erik Andersson	R	1977–1982	322	59	68	127	56	36	4	10	14	4
Michael Antonovich	C	1975–1982	14	0	2	2	8	—	—	—	—	—
Dave Archibald	C	1987–1990	162	28	44	72	46	5	0	1	1	0
James Archibald	R	1984–1987	16	1	2	3	45	—	—	—	—	—
Ernest Arnason	R	1978–1979	1	0	0	0	0	—	—	—	—	—
Brent Ashton	L	1983–1985	97	11	17	28	69	12	1	2	3	22
Warren Babe	L	1987–1991	21	2	5	7	23	2	0	0	0	0
John Baby	D	1978–1979	2	0	1	1	0	—	—	—	—	—
Helmut Balderis	R	1989–1990	26	3	6	9	2	—	—	—	—	—
Dave Balon	L	1967–1968	73	15	32	47	84	14	4	9	13	14
Don Barber	L	1988–1991	74	23	24	47	44	11	4	4	8	10
Bob Barlow	L	1969–1971	77	16	17	33	10	6	2	2	4	6
Douglas Barrault	R	1992–1993	2	0	0	0	2	—	—	—	—	—
Frederick Barrett	D	1970–1983	730	23	123	146	663	44	0	2	2	60
John Barrett	D	1987–1988	1	0	1	1	2	—	—	—	—	—
Norm Beaudin	R	1970–1971	12	0	1	1	0	—	—	—	—	—
Brian Bellows	L	1982–1992	753	342	380	722	537	81	34	49	83	111
Harvey Bennett	C	1977–1978	64	11	10	21	91	—	—	—	—	—
Perry Berezan	C	1988–1991	132	15	22	37	65	11	2	2	4	4
Mike Berger	D	1987–1989	30	3	1	4	67	—	—	—	—	—
Robert Bergloff	D	1982–1983	2	0	0	0	5	—	—	—	—	—
Bo Berglund	L	1984–1986	36	8	9	17	10	2	0	0	0	2
Gary Bergman	D	1973–1974	57	3	23	26	66	—	—	—	—	—
Brad Berry	D	1991–1993	70	0	3	3	115	2	0	0	0	2
Nick Beverley	D	1976–1978	109	9	31	40	24	—	—	—	—	—
Dwight Bialowas	D	1974–1977	116	8	37	45	24	—	—	—	—	—
Donald Biggs	C	1984–1985	1	0	0	0	0	—	—	—	—	—
Barry Bjugstad	L	1983–1988	229	68	58	126	116	5	0	1	1	0
James Black	L	1992–1993	10	2	1	3	4	—	—	—	—	—
Don Blackburn	L	1972–1973	4	0	0	0	4	—	—	—	—	—
Richard Boh	C	1987–1988	8	2	1	3	4	—	—	—	—	—
Leo Boivin (HHOF 1986)	D	1968–1970	97	4	18	22	46	3	0	0	0	0
James Boo	D	1977–1978	6	0	0	0	22	—	—	—	—	—
Henry Boucha	C	1974–1975	51	15	14	29	23	—	—	—	—	—
Andre Boudrias	L	1967–1969	127	22	44	66	48	14	3	6	9	8
Paul Boutilier	D	1986–1987	10	2	4	6	8	—	—	—	—	—
Per-Olov Brasar	C	1977–1980	167	27	79	106	12	—	—	—	—	—
Bob Brooke	R	1986–1990	237	26	51	77	276	5	3	0	3	2
Aaron Broten	C	1989–1990	35	9	9	18	22	7	0	5	5	8
Neal Broten	C	1980–1993	876	249	547	796	457	104	26	49	75	65
Murray Brumwell	D	1980–1982	22	0	3	3	18	2	0	0	0	2
Marc Bureau	C	1990–1992	55	6	10	16	54	28	3	2	5	34
Charlie Burns	C	1969–1973	268	27	53	80	60	31	5	4	9	6
William Butters	D	1977–1979	72	1	4	5	77	—	—	—	—	—
Jerry Byers	L	1972–1974	24	0	2	2	6	—	—	—	—	—
Terry Caffery	C	1970–1971	8	0	0	0	0	1	0	0	0	0
Craig Cameron	R	1971–1976	182	20	18	38	57	5	0	1	1	2
Jack Carlson	L	1978–1987	124	18	6	24	264	16	1	2	3	65
Jay Caufield	R	1987–1988	1	0	0	0	0	—	—	—	—	—
Shawn Chambers	D	1987–1991	198	15	47	62	206	33	2	10	12	26
Bob Charlebois	L	1967–1968	7	1	0	1	0	—	—	—	—	—
Mike Chernoff	L	1968–1969	1	0	0	0	0	—	—	—	—	—
Daniel Chicoine	R	1978–1980	25	1	2	3	12	1	0	0	0	0
Rick Chinnick	R	1973–1975	4	0	2	2	0	—	—	—	—	—
Colin Chisholm	D	1986–1987	1	0	0	0	0	—	—	—	—	—
Steve Christoff	C	1979–1982	145	60	49	109	91	34	16	12	28	25
Shane Churla	R	1988–1993	236	14	22	36	1,196	29	2	1	3	134
Dino Ciccarelli (HHOF 2001)	R	1980–1989	602	332	319	651	642	62	28	23	51	79
Enrico Ciccone	D	1991–1993	42	0	1	1	163	—	—	—	—	—
Thomas Colley	C	1974–1975	1	0	0	0	2	—	—	—	—	—
Bill Collins	R	1967–1970	220	47	30	77	113	16	2	5	7	12
Wayne Connelly	C	1967–1969	129	49	37	86	51	14	8	3	11	2
Joseph Contini	C	1980–1981	1	0	0	0	0	—	—	—	—	—
Bob Cook	R	1974–1975	2	0	1	1	0	—	—	—	—	—
Timothy Coulis	L	1983–1986	28	3	3	6	111	3	1	0	1	2
Russ Courtnall	R	1992–1993	84	36	43	79	49	—	—	—	—	—
Michael Craig	R	1990–1993	176	38	43	81	293	14	2	1	3	27
Dave Cressman	L	1974–1976	85	6	8	14	37	—	—	—	—	—
Ray Cullen	C	1967–1970	208	71	91	162	70	20	3	10	13	2
Ulf Dahlen	R	1989–1993	241	94	91	185	22	29	3	13	16	8
Christopher Dahlquist	D	1990–1992	116	3	19	22	101	30	1	6	7	26
Larry Depalma	C	1985–1991	121	18	14	32	362	2	0	0	0	6
Gary Dineen	C	1968–1969	4	0	1	1	0	—	—	—	—	—
Gordon Dineen	D	1987–1989	15	1	2	3	23	—	—	—	—	—
James Dobson	R	1979–1982	8	0	0	0	4	—	—	—	—	—
Clark Donatelli	L	1989–1990	25	3	3	6	17	—	—	—	—	—
Jordy Douglas	L	1982–1984	82	16	18	34	40	5	0	0	0	2
Jude Drouin	C	1970–1975	319	79	183	262	187	25	10	14	24	16
Gaetan Duchesne	L	1989–1993	297	45	45	90	183	37	3	3	6	46
Kenneth Duggan	D	1987–1988	1	0	0	0	0	—	—	—	—	—
Blake Dunlop	C	1973–1977	100	18	30	48	18	—	—	—	—	—
Michael Eaves	C	1978–1983	207	55	78	133	50	24	2	5	7	4
Todd Elik	L	1991–1993	108	27	50	77	173	5	1	1	2	2
Jerry Engele	D	1975–1978	100	2	13	15	162	2	0	1	1	0
Grant Erickson	L	1969–1970	4	0	0	0	0	—	—	—	—	—
Roland Eriksson	C	1976–1978	158	46	83	129	22	2	1	0	1	0
Kevin Evans	L	1990–1991	4	0	0	0	19	—	—	—	—	—
Bill Fairbairn	R	1976–1978	57	9	21	30	2	2	0	1	1	0
Tony Featherstone	R	1973–1974	54	9	12	21	4	—	—	—	—	—
George Ferguson	C	1982–1984	128	14	22	36	33	22	2	3	5	6
Michael Fidler	L	1978–1981	103	33	42	75	61	—	—	—	—	—
Sandy Fitzpatrick	C	1967–1968	18	3	6	9	6	12	0	0	0	0
John Flesch	R	1974–1976	90	11	17	28	94	—	—	—	—	—
Robert Flockhart	R	1979–1981	12	1	3	4	2	1	1	0	1	2
Jon Fontas	C	1979–1981	2	0	0	0	0	—	—	—	—	—
Curt Fraser	L	1987–1990	53	7	6	13	118	—	—	—	—	—
Ron Friest	L	1980–1983	64	7	7	14	191	6	1	0	1	7
Link Gaetz	D	1988–1990	17	0	2	2	86	—	—	—	—	—
Dave Gagner	C	1987–1993	440	187	217	404	577	37	16	22	38	52
James Gallimore	R	1977–1978	2	0	0	0	0	—	—	—	—	—
Gary Gambucci	C	1971–1974	51	2	7	9	9	—	—	—	—	—
Mike Gartner (HHOF 2001)	R	1988–1990	80	41	43	84	34	5	0	0	0	6
Robert Gavin	R	1988–1993	289	39	47	86	232	40	6	13	19	46
Gary Geldart	D	1970–1971	4	0	0	0	5	—	—	—	—	—
Barry Gibbs	D	1969–1975	375	35	121	156	600	30	3	2	5	63
Brent Gilchrist	L	1992–1993	8	0	1	1	2	—	—	—	—	—
Curt Giles	D	1979–1991	760	40	177	217	625	92	5	15	20	110
Brian Glynn	D	1990–1992	103	10	23	33	107	23	2	6	8	20
Pete Goegan	D	1967–1968	46	1	2	3	30	—	—	—	—	—
Bill Goldsworthy	R	1967–1977	670	267	239	506	711	40	18	19	37	30
Steve Gotaas	C	1988–1991	13	1	3	4	8	3	0	1	1	5
Dirk Graham	R	1983–1988	226	67	79	146	291	15	3	5	8	11
Danny Grant	L	1968–1974	463	176	177	353	161	31	10	9	19	12
Norm Gratton	L	1974–1976	66	21	15	36	22	—	—	—	—	—
Jari Gronstrand	D	1986–1987	47	1	6	7	27	—	—	—	—	—
Marc Habscheid	C	1985–1989	113	31	45	76	48	7	1	3	4	13
Anders Hakansson	L	1981–1983	77	12	4	16	38	3	0	0	0	2
Murray Hall	R	1967–1968	17	2	1	3	10	—	—	—	—	—
Mats Hallin	C	1985–1987	44	3	2	5	90	1	0	0	0	0
Ted Hampson	C	1970–1972	96	9	20	29	10	18	3	4	7	0
David Hanson	D	1979–1980	22	1	1	2	39	—	—	—	—	—
Mark Hardy	D	1988–1989	15	2	4	6	26	—	—	—	—	—
Duke Harris	R	1967–1968	22	1	4	5	4	—	—	—	—	—
Ted Harris	D	1970–1974	246	11	52	63	294	24	0	6	6	68
Craig Hartsburg	D	1979–1989	570	98	315	413	818	61	15	27	42	70
Buster Harvey	R	1970–1974	199	49	59	108	66	14	0	2	2	8
Derian Hatcher	D	1991–1993	110	12	19	31	266	5	0	2	2	8
Peter Hayek	C	1981–1982	1	0	0	0	0	—	—	—	—	—
Bill Heindl	L	1970–1972	14	1	1	2	0	—	—	—	—	—
Raimo Helminen	C	1986–1987	6	0	1	1	0	—	—	—	—	—
Archie Henderson	R	1981–1982	1	0	0	0	0	—	—	—	—	—
Dennis Hextall	C	1971–1976	328	84	216	300	567	13	2	2	4	35
Bryan Hextall Jr.	C	1975–1976	58	8	20	28	84	—	—	—	—	—
Ernest Hicke	L	1974–1977	199	68	52	120	169	2	1	0	1	0
Douglas Hicks	D	1974–1978	300	18	48	66	224	2	0	0	0	7
Larry Hillman	D	1968–1969	12	1	5	6	0	—	—	—	—	—
Wayne Hillman	D	1968–1969	50	0	8	8	32	—	—	—	—	—
Thomas Hirsch	D	1983–1988	31	1	7	8	30	12	0	0	0	6
Kenneth Hodge Jr.	C	1988–1989	5	1	1	2	0	—	—	—	—	—
Bill Hogaboam	C	1975–1979	109	19	25	44	26	2	0	0	0	0
Terry Holbrook	R	1972–1974	43	3	6	9	4	6	0	0	0	0
Paul Holmgren	R	1983–1985	27	6	8	14	84	15	0	1	1	14
Bronco Horvath	C	1967–1968	14	1	6	7	4	—	—	—	—	—
Ed Hospodar	D	1985–1986	43	0	2	2	91	2	0	0	0	2
Paul Houck	R	1985–1988	16	1	2	3	2	—	—	—	—	—
Don Jackson	D	1977–1981	27	0	7	7	41	1	0	0	0	0
Mark Janssens	C	1991–1992	3	0	0	0	0	—	—	—	—	—
Pierre Jarry	L	1975–1978	115	38	48	86	36	—	—	—	—	—
Wesley Jarvis	C	1982–1983	3	0	0	0	2	—	—	—	—	—
David Jensen	D	1983–1986	18	0	2	2	11	—	—	—	—	—
Steven Jensen	L	1975–1978	171	42	46	88	141	2	0	1	1	0
Paul Jerrard	D	1988–1989	5	0	0	0	4	—	—	—	—	—
Don Johns	D	1967–1968	4	0	0	0	6	—	—	—	—	—
James Johnson	D	1990–1993	194	8	39	47	307	21	1	4	5	70
Mark Johnson	C	1981–1982	10	2	2	4	10	4	2	0	2	0
Joey Johnston	L	1968–1969	11	1	0	1	6	—	—	—	—	—
Marshall Johnston	D	1967–1971	49	0	5	5	16	6	0	0	0	2
Kevin Kaminski	C	1988–1989	1	0	0	0	0	—	—	—	—	—
Dan Keczmer	D	1990–1991	9	0	1	1	6	—	—	—	—	—
Udo Kiessling	D	1981–1982	1	0	0	0	2	—	—	—	—	—
Trent Klatt	R	1991–1993	48	4	19	23	38	6	0	0	0	2
Dean Kolstad	D	1988–1991	30	1	5	6	57	—	—	—	—	—
Gord Labossiere	C	1970–1972	38	10	7	17	4	3	0	0	0	4
Glenn Laird	L	1979–1980	1	0	0	0	0	—	—	—	—	—
David Langevin	D	1985–1986	80	0	8	8	58	5	0	1	1	9
Alain Langlais	L	1973–1975	25	4	4	8	10	—	—	—	—	—
Peter Lappin	R	1989–1990	6	0	0	0	2	—	—	—	—	—
Claude Larose	R	1968–1970	142	49	60	109	215	6	1	1	2	25
Reed Larson	D	1988–1989	11	0	9	9	18	3	0	0	0	4
Daniel Lawson	R	1968–1971	96	13	16	29	25	16	0	1	1	2
Brian Lawton	C	1983–1988	303	71	91	162	250	8	0	1	1	12
Ken Leiter	D	1989–1990	4	0	0	0	0	—	—	—	—	—
Craig Levie	D	1983–1986	51	8	15	23	52	15	2	3	5	32
Lars Lindgren	D	1983–1984	59	2	14	16	33	15	2	0	2	6
Craig Ludwig	D	1991–1993	151	3	19	22	207	7	0	1	1	19
Len Lunde	C	1967–1968	7	0	1	1	0	—	—	—	—	—
Reginald MacAdam	R	1978–1984	459	138	202	340	268	63	20	24	44	21
Parker MacDonald	C	1967–1969	104	21	32	53	22	14	4	5	9	2
Kim MacDougall	D	1974–1975	1	0	0	0	0	—	—	—	—	—
Barry MacKenzie	D	1968–1969	6	0	1	1	6	—	—	—	—	—
David Mackey	L	1989–1990	16	2	0	2	28	—	—	—	—	—
Brian MacLellan	L	1986–1989	211	64	86	150	247	—	—	—	—	—
Pat MacLeod	D	1990–1991	1	0	1	1	0	—	—	—	—	—
Dean Magee	C	1977–1978	7	0	0	0	4	—	—	—	—	—
Steve Maltais	L	1991–1992	12	2	1	3	2	—	—	—	—	—
Daniel Mandich	D	1982–1986	111	5	11	16	303	7	0	0	0	2
Kris Manery	R	1978–1980	88	20	23	43	32	—	—	—	—	—
Maurice Mantha	D	1987–1989	46	10	19	29	14	—	—	—	—	—
Milan Marcetta	C	1967–1969	54	7	15	22	10	14	7	7	14	4
John Markell	L	1984–1985	1	0	0	0		—	—	—	—	—
Terry Martin	L	1984–1985	7	1	1	2	0	—	—	—	—	—
Tom Martin	L	1988–1989	4	1	1	2	4	—	—	—	—	—
Don Martineau	R	1974–1975	76	6	9	15	61	—	—	—	—	—
Steve Martinson	L	1991–1992	1	0	0	0	9	—	—	—	—	—
Dennis Maruk	C	1978–1989	309	80	156	236	234	30	13	21	34	24
Bill Masterton	C	1967–1968	38	4	8	12	4	—	—	—	—	—
Richard Matvichuk	D	1992–1993	53	2	3	5	26	—	—	—	—	—
Brad Maxwell	D	1977–1987	471	82	217	299	1,031	58	10	39	49	131
Bryan Maxwell	D	1977–1979	43	3	11	14	87	—	—	—	—	—
Kevin Maxwell	C	1980–1982	18	1	7	8	15	16	3	4	7	24
Thomas McCarthy	L	1979–1986	385	146	187	333	293	51	8	21	29	45
Ted McCaskill	C	1967–1968	4	0	2	2	0	—	—	—	—	—
Bob McCord	D	1967–1969	139	7	26	33	109	14	2	5	7	10
Jim McElmury	D	1972–1973	7	0	1	1	2	—	—	—	—	—
Michael McHugh	L	1988–1991	12	0	0	0	2	—	—	—	—	—
Bruce McIntosh	D	1972–1973	2	0	0	0	0	—	—	—	—	—
Walter McKechnie	C	1967–1971	112	9	13	22	77	9	3	2	5	0
Tony McKegney	L	1984–1987	108	28	41	69	68	14	10	7	17	22
James McKenny	D	1978–1979	10	1	1	2	2	—	—	—	—	—
Mike McMahon, Jr.	D	1967–1969	117	14	44	58	92	14	3	7	10	4
Michael McPhee	L	1992–1993	84	18	22	40	44	—	—	—	—	—
Basil McRae	L	1987–1992	323	32	58	90	1,567	34	2	1	3	176
Ron Meighan	D	1981–1982	7	1	1	2	2	—	—	—	—	—
Barrie Meissner	L	1967–1969	6	0	1	1	4	—	—	—	—	—
Roger Melin	C	1980–1982	3	0	0	0	0	—	—	—	—	—
Mitchell Messier	R	1987–1991	20	0	2	2	11	—	—	—	—	—
Patrick Micheletti	C	1987–1988	12	2	0	2	8	—	—	—	—	—
Kip Miller	C	1991–1992	3	1	2	3	2	—	—	—	—	—
John Miszuk	D	1969–1970	50	0	6	6	51	—	—	—	—	—
Roy Mitchell	D	1992–1993	3	0	0	0	0	—	—	—	—	—
Mike Modano (HHOF 2014)	C	1989–1993	317	123	186	309	253	39	12	15	27	32
Doug Mohns	L	1970–1973	162	12	48	60	148	16	3	5	8	22
Jayson More	D	1989–1990	5	0	0	0	16	—	—	—	—	—
Wayne Muloin	D	1970–1971	7	0	0	0	6	7	0	0	0	2
Larry Murphy (HHOF 2004)	D	1988–1991	121	18	75	93	94	12	1	4	5	39
Frantisek Musil	D	1986–1991	271	14	46	60	547	9	1	1	2	18
Lou Nanne	D	1967–1978	635	68	157	225	356	32	4	10	14	8
Rich Nantais	L	1974–1977	63	5	4	9	79	—	—	—	—	—
Mark Napier	R	1983–1985	97	23	46	69	19	12	3	2	5	0
Bob Nevin	R	1971–1973	138	20	32	52	6	7	1	1	2	0
Kent Nilsson	C	1985–1987	105	29	77	106	22	5	1	4	5	0
Rod Norrish	L	1973–1975	21	3	3	6	2	—	—	—	—	—
William Nyrop	D	1981–1982	42	4	8	12	35	2	0	0	0	0
Dennis O'Brien	D	1970–1978	470	27	75	102	836	20	1	1	2	73
Danny O'Shea	C	1968–1971	208	39	70	109	186	6	1	0	1	8
Murray Oliver	C	1970–1975	371	83	118	201	62	25	7	14	21	6
Bill Orban	C	1968–1970	30	1	7	8	17	—	—	—	—	—
Mark Osiecki	D	1992–1993	5	0	0	0	5	—	—	—	—	—
Brad Palmer	L	1980–1982	95	26	27	53	40	22	8	5	13	16
Robert Paradise	D	1971–1972	6	0	0	0	6	4	0	0	0	2
Jean-Paul Parise	L	1967–1979	588	154	242	396	509	45	11	13	24	49
Dusan Pasek	C	1988–1989	48	4	10	14	30	2	1	0	1	0
Mark Pavelich	C	1986–1987	12	4	6	10	10	—	—	—	—	—
Steven Payne	L	1978–1988	613	228	238	466	435	71	35	35	70	60
Allen Pedersen	D	1991–1992	29	0	1	1	10	—	—	—	—	—
Joseph Pirus	R	1976–1979	155	30	26	56	94	2	0	1	1	2
Bill Plager	D	1967–1976	60	0	5	5	61	12	0	2	2	8
Willi Plett	R	1982–1987	317	70	63	133	1,137	39	10	12	22	201
Tom Polanic	D	1969–1971	19	0	2	2	53	5	1	1	2	4
Michael Polich	C	1978–1981	225	24	29	53	57	18	2	1	3	2
Jean Potvin	D	1978–1979	64	5	16	21	65	—	—	—	—	—
Daniel Poulin	D	1981–1982	3	1	1	2	2	—	—	—	—	—
Dean Prentice	L	1971–1974	168	48	46	94	40	13	4	0	4	16
Pat Price	D	1987–1988	14	0	2	2	20	—	—	—	—	—
Andre Pronovost	L	1967–1968	8	0	0	0	0	8	0	1	1	0
Brian Propp	L	1990–1993	147	41	73	114	107	24	8	15	23	28
Christopher Pryor	D	1984–1988	64	1	4	5	71	—	—	—	—	—
Dan Quinn	C	1992–1993	11	0	4	4	6	—	—	—	—	—
Rob Ramage	D	1991–1992	34	4	5	9	69	—	—	—	—	—
Richard Redmond	D	1969–1971	16	0	3	3	20	—	—	—	—	—
Tom Reid	D	1968–1978	615	17	106	123	617	33	1	13	14	47
Dave Richter	D	1981–1986	120	4	14	18	397	17	1	0	1	59
Gordon Roberts	D	1980–1988	555	33	224	257	832	61	6	30	36	95
James Roberts	R	1976–1979	106	17	23	40	33	2	0	0	0	0
John Rogers	R	1973–1975	14	2	4	6	0	—	—	—	—	—
Doug Rombough	C	1974–1976	59	8	11	19	39	—	—	—	—	—
Robert Rouse	D	1983–1989	351	9	58	67	735	3	0	0	0	0
Bobby Rousseau	R	1970–1971	63	4	20	24	12	12	2	6	8	0
Stephane Roy	C	1987–1988	12	1	0	1	0	—	—	—	—	—
Duane Rupp	D	1968–1969	29	2	1	3	8	—	—	—	—	—
Terry Ruskowski	C	1987–1989	50	6	13	19	78	—	—	—	—	—
Scott Sandelin	D	1991–1992	1	0	0	0	0	—	—	—	—	—
Gary Sargent	D	1978–1983	187	32	71	103	120	9	2	3	5	2
Glen Sather (HHOF 1997)	L	1975–1976	72	9	10	19	94	—	—	—	—	—
Wally Schreiber	R	1987–1989	41	8	10	18	12	—	—	—	—	—
Dan Seguin	L	1970–1971	11	1	1	2	4	—	—	—	—	—
George Servinis	L	1987–1988	5	0	0	0	0	—	—	—	—	—
Glen Sharpley	C	1976–1981	318	98	138	236	176	11	1	6	7	8
David Shaw	D	1991–1992	37	0	7	7	49	7	2	2	4	10
Gord Sherven	C	1984–1986	45	2	14	16	19	3	0	0	0	0
Paul Shmyr	D	1979–1981	124	4	24	28	163	17	2	1	3	27
Reid Simpson	L	1992–1993	1	0	0	0	5	—	—	—	—	—
Ilkka Sinisalo	R	1990–1991	46	5	12	17	24	—	—	—	—	—
Ville Siren	D	1988–1990	91	3	23	26	118	7	0	0	0	6
Tommy Sjodin	D	1992–1993	77	7	29	36	30	—	—	—	—	—
Darryl Sly	D	1969–1970	29	1	0	1	6	—	—	—	—	—
Douglas Smail	L	1990–1991	57	7	13	20	38	1	0	0	0	0
Bobby Smith	C	1978–1993	572	185	369	554	487	77	26	50	76	96
Brian Smith	L	1968–1969	9	0	1	1	0	—	—	—	—	—
Derrick Smith	L	1991–1993	42	2	5	7	35	7	1	0	1	9
Gregory Smith	D	1978–1981	209	15	61	76	376	31	1	6	7	48
Randy Smith	C	1985–1987	3	0	0	0	0	—	—	—	—	—
Harold Snepsts	D	1984–1985	71	0	7	7	232	9	0	0	0	24
Ken Solheim	L	1980–1985	114	16	20	36	27	3	1	1	2	2
George Standing	R	1967–1968	2	0	0	0	0	—	—	—	—	—
Fred Stanfield	L	1973–1975	111	24	46	70	22	—	—	—	—	—
William Stewart	D	1985–1986	8	0	2	2	13	—	—	—	—	—
Peter Taglianetti	D	1990–1991	16	0	1	1	14	—	—	—	—	—
Dean Talafous	C	1974–1978	277	61	90	151	59	2	0	0	0	0
Jean-Guy Talbot	D	1967–1968	4	0	0	0	4	—	—	—	—	—
Ted Taylor	L	1967–1968	31	3	5	8	34	—	—	—	—	—
William Terry	C	1987–1988	5	0	0	0	0	—	—	—	—	—
Mario Thyer	C	1989–1990	5	0	0	0	0	1	0	0	0	2
Mark Tinordi	D	1988–1993	314	29	88	117	872	42	6	9	15	105
Kirk Tomlinson	C	1987–1988	1	0	0	0	0	—	—	—	—	—
Sean Toomey	C	1986–1987	1	0	0	0	0	—	—	—	—	—
Timothy Trimper	L	1984–1985	20	1	4	5	15	—	—	—	—	—
Allan Tuer	D	1987–1988	6	1	0	1	29	—	—	—	—	—
Moose Vasko	D	1967–1970	145	2	13	15	113	14	0	2	2	6
Randy Velischek	D	1982–1985	88	6	11	17	38	19	2	3	5	8
Emanuel Viveiros	D	1985–1988	29	1	11	12	6	—	—	—	—	—
Anthony White	L	1979–1980	6	0	0	0	4	—	—	—	—	—
Bob Whitlock	C	1969–1970	1	0	0	0	0	—	—	—	—	—
Neil Wilkinson	D	1989–1991	86	2	14	16	217	29	3	5	8	23
Tommy Williams	R	1969–1971	116	25	65	90	34	6	1	5	6	0
Ronald Wilson	D	1984–1988	113	19	52	71	62	14	3	10	13	6
Bob Woytowich	D	1967–1968	66	4	17	21	63	14	0	1	1	18
Timothy Young	C	1975–1983	564	178	316	494	401	35	7	23	30	27
Warren Young	C	1981–1983	5	1	1	2	0	—	—	—	—	—
Tom Younghans	R	1976–1982	382	41	36	77	356	22	2	1	3	21
Ronald Zanussi	R	1977–1981	244	49	75	124	353	14	0	4	4	17
Richard Zemlak	C	1987–1989	57	1	4	5	320	—	—	—	—	—
Rob Zettler	D	1988–1991	80	1	12	13	164	—	—	—	—	—

== Goaltenders ==
		Regular season							Playoffs					
Player	Years	GP	W	L	T	SO	GAA	SV%	GP	W	L	SO	GAA	SV%
Gary Bauman	1967–1969	33	4	15	6	0	3.64	—	—	—	—	—	—	—
Don Beaupre	1980–1989	316	126	125	45	3	3.74	—	34	15	16	1	3.70	—
Daniel Berthiaume	1989–1990	5	1	3	0	0	3.49	0.865	—	—	—	—	—	—
Ken Broderick	1969–1970	7	2	4	0	0	4.33	—	—	—	—	—	—	—
Jonathan Casey	1983–1993	325	128	126	42	12	3.28	—	41	21	18	2	3.17	0.894
James Craig	1983–1984	3	1	1	0	0	4.91	—	—	—	—	—	—	—
Gary Edwards	1978–1980	51	15	18	15	0	3.44	—	7	3	3	0	3.92	—
Gilles Gilbert	1969–1973	44	16	22	5	2	3.39	—	1	0	1	0	4.00	—
Paul Harrison	1975–1978	35	6	22	3	1	4.18	—	—	—	—	—	—	—
Brian Hayward	1990–1991	26	6	15	3	2	3.14	0.886	6	0	2	0	3.86	0.853
Steve Janaszek	1979–1980	1	0	0	1	0	2.00	—	—	—	—	—	—	—
Jean Levasseur	1979–1980	1	0	1	0	0	7.00	—	—	—	—	—	—	—
Peter Lopresti	1974–1979	173	43	101	20	5	4.06	—	2	0	2	0	4.68	—
Cesare Maniago	1967–1976	420	145	190	70	26	3.18	—	34	14	20	3	2.69	—
Markus Mattsson	1982–1983	2	1	1	0	1	3.60	—	—	—	—	—	—	—
Roland Melanson	1984–1986	26	7	11	5	0	4.17	—	—	—	—	—	—	—
Gilles Meloche	1978–1985	327	141	117	52	9	3.51	—	45	21	19	2	3.48	—
Lindsay Middlebrook	1981–1982	3	0	0	2	0	3.00	—	—	—	—	—	—	—
Jarmo Myllys	1988–1991	12	1	9	0	0	5.84	0.834	—	—	—	—	—	—
Fern Rivard	1968–1975	55	9	27	11	2	3.98	—	—	—	—	—	—	—
Michael Sands	1984–1987	6	0	5	0	0	5.17	—	—	—	—	—	—	—
Gary Smith	1976–1978	39	10	19	9	1	3.91	—	1	0	0	0	5.58	—
Kari Takko	1985–1991	131	33	67	14	1	3.87	—	4	0	1	0	3.86	0.873
Darcy Wakaluk	1991–1993	65	23	31	6	2	3.44	0.880	—	—	—	—	—	—
Carl Wetzel	1967–1968	5	1	3	1	0	4.01	—	—	—	—	—	—	—
Gump Worsley (HHOF 1980)	1969–1974	107	39	37	24	3	2.62	—	11	6	4	1	3.32	—

== See also ==
- List of NHL players
