= 1975–76 Minnesota Golden Gophers men's ice hockey season =

National champion WCHA tournament, co-champion NCAA tournament, champion
- Conference: 3rd WCHA; 3rd Big Ten
- Home ice: Williams Arena

Record
- Overall: 28–14–2
- Conference: 18–13–1 / 4–8
- Home: 13–6–0
- Road: 12–8–2
- Neutral: 3–0–0

Coaches and captains
- Head coach: Herb Brooks
- Assistant coaches: Brad Buetow
- Captain: Pat Phippen
- Alternate captain(s): Warren Miller; Tom Vannelli

The 1975–76 Minnesota Golden Gophers men's ice hockey team represented the University of Minnesota in college ice hockey. In its 4th year under head coach Herb Brooks the team compiled a 28–14–2 record and reached the NCAA tournament for the third consecutive year and seventh all-time. The Golden Gophers defeated Michigan Tech 6–4 in the championship game at the DU Arena in Denver, Colorado to win their second national championship.

== Season ==
=== Fast start ===
After a disappointing end to what was otherwise a tremendous season, Minnesota entered the 1975–76 campaign with a fairly young team. Herb Brooks' squad had only two seniors and four juniors leaving the team rather shorthanded in terms of experience. The Gophers' didn't let their youth stand in the way of a fast start, however. Minnesota won their first game in October over the US National Team which kicked off a 5-game winning streak. The Gophers suffered their first loss in their first true road game of the season when they were beaten by Denver in overtime. While Minnesota recovered to earn a split for the weekend, that series was the start of a 10-game trend where they alternated wins and losses. At the end of December Minnesota finally stopped losing every weekend and put together another 5-game winning streak to push their record to 14–5.

=== New Year and .500 hockey ===
The Gophers began 1976 with a series against the defending national champions, Michigan Tech and while they split the series, the two teams combined for 25 goals in the two games. Minnesota then took seven out of eight points against Notre Dame and Denver before visiting Michigan and dropping both contest to the surprisingly strong Wolverines. After two more wins at Minnesota–Duluth the Gophers lost two more Big Ten contests, this time to Michigan State. Two losses dropped Minnesota's Big Ten record to 2–6 though they were still well positioned with a 19–10–1 mark in the WCHA. The following weekend the Gophers split with Wisconsin to guarantee that they would finish with a losing record in the Big Ten and continued to split each weekend for the remaining 4 weeks of the regular season.

=== WCHA tournament ===
Despite their mediocre finish, Minnesota managed to hold onto home ice for the first round of the WCHA tournament and played host to Colorado College. The Gopher defense stepped up in the first game and gave Minnesota a 4-goal margin of victory that allowed the team to cruise to a 10–5 series win after taking the second contest. Minnesota was forced to hit the road for the second round, heading to Michigan State and facing off against the nation's leading scorer in Tom Ross. Minnesota was able to hold the Spartan offence to only two goals in the first game but could only manage two itself and the match ended in a 2-2 tie. both offenses woke up for the deciding second game and managed to score six times in regulation. Overtime was played at the same high pace but the goaltenders turned aside everything that came their way for over 40 minutes before Minnesota broke the tie and captured their third straight WCHA championship. Jeff Tscherne recorded 72 saves in the win, a Minnesota team record as of 2018.

=== NCAA tournament ===
As they had two years earlier, Minnesota opened as the underdog against ECAC champion Boston University and just like 1974 the Gophers were able to send the Terriers packing. In the championship game Minnesota met Michigan Tech for the third consecutive year, the only time in NCAA where the same two team made the final three years running (as of 2019). The defending champion Huskies had produced a stellar season thus far and had already set a new NCAA record with 34 wins on the season. The top offense in the nation was led by future NHL-er Mike Zuke who had posted 103 points on the season and was only two behind Tom Ross for the scoring title. It didn't take much time from the start of the contest to figure out that it was not Jeff Tscherne's night. Michigan Tech scored three times in under four minutes to build a huge lead less than twelve minutes into the contest. Tscherne remained in net for the rest of the period and was able to stem the tide but it was a power play goal from Tom Vannelli at the end of the first that gave Minnesota some breathing room. Tscherne was replaced by Tom Mohr from the second on and the junior netminder was given time to settle in when Minnesota opened an offensive salvo on the Michigan Tech net. The Gophers outshot the Huskies 16–3 in the second and scored three times to erase the Tech advantage and take the lead themselves. Michigan Tech halted the Gopher charge with their fourth goal that came with 36 seconds to play to send the teams into the final frame in a tied game. The play was much more even in the third but Minnesota managed to score first with team captain Pat Phippen's goal near the middle of the stanza. Mohr held the Huskies off the scoresheet and allowed Warren Miller to cap the scoring with 30 seconds left.

Minnesota's second championship in three years was even more improbable that their first and the 1976 Golden Gophers became the first team since the 1948–49 Boston College Eagles to have a national champion composed entirely of American players. Furthermore, with Jim Boo having been raised in Minnesota they were the second team to have all of their players hail from one state.

Tom Vannelli's 5 points in the title tile earned him the Tournament MOP, however, for the only time in its history the NCAA did not name an All-Tournament Team. No Minnesota players were named to the AHCA All-American West Team and only Reed Larson made an appearance on an All-WCHA Team, earning first-team honors.

Three Minnesota players were taken at the 1976 NHL Amateur Draft. Reed Larson went on to have a very successful NHL career, becoming a three-time NHL All-Star.

== Standings ==
1975–76 Western Collegiate Hockey Association standings
	Conference							Overall					
	GP	W	L	T	PTS	GF	GA	GP	W	L	T	GF	GA
Michigan Tech†*	32	25	7	0	50	190	134	43	34	9	0	255	177
Michigan State	32	20	12	0	40	154	139	40	23	15	2	193	176
Minnesota*	32	18	13	1	37	129	119	44	28	14	2	190	158
Michigan	32	17	15	0	34	157	141	39	21	18	0	196	176
Notre Dame	32	15	15	2	32	143	140	38	19	17	2	171	173
Colorado College	32	15	16	1	31	131	133	38	15	22	1	151	181
Wisconsin	32	11	19	2	24	137	151	38	12	24	2	153	177
Denver	32	12	20	0	24	120	140	39	16	23	0	165	175
Minnesota-Duluth	32	12	20	0	24	132	160	36	15	21	0	159	179
North Dakota	32	12	20	0	24	119	155	36	15	21	0	142	168
Championship: Minnesota, Michigan Tech † indicates conference regular season champion * indicates conference tournament champion

1975–76 Big Ten standings
	Conference							Overall					
	GP	W	L	T	PTS	GF	GA	GP	W	L	T	GF	GA
Michigan State†	12	9	3	0	18	57	49	40	23	15	2	193	176
Michigan	12	8	4	0	16	69	52	39	21	18	0	196	176
Minnesota	12	4	8	0	8	42	53	44	28	14	2	190	158
Wisconsin	12	3	9	0	6	49	63	38	12	24	2	153	177
† indicates conference regular season champion

== Schedule ==
Date	Opponent^{#}	Rank^{#}	Site	Result	Record
Regular season
October 25	vs. US National Team*		Eveleth Hippodrome • Eveleth, Minnesota (Hall of Fame Game)	W 5–2	1–0
October 27	vs. Saint Louis*		Williams Arena • Minneapolis, Minnesota	W 4–3	2–0
October 28	vs. Saint Louis*		Williams Arena • Minneapolis, Minnesota	W 6–3	3–0
November 7	vs. Minnesota–Duluth		Williams Arena • Minneapolis, Minnesota	W 5–4 ^{OT}	4–0 (1–0)
November 8	vs. Minnesota–Duluth		Williams Arena • Minneapolis, Minnesota	W 4–2	5–0 (2–0)
November 14	at Denver		DU Arena • Denver, Colorado	L 2–3 ^{OT}	5–1 (2–1)
November 15	at Denver		DU Arena • Denver, Colorado	W 5–1	6–1 (3–1)
November 21	at Michigan State		Munn Ice Arena • East Lansing, Michigan	L 1–3	6–2 (3–2 / 0–1)
November 22	at Michigan State		Munn Ice Arena • East Lansing, Michigan	W 4–2	7–2 (4–2 / 1–1)
November 28	vs. Wisconsin		Williams Arena • Minneapolis, Minnesota	L 2–4	7–3 (4–3 / 1–2)
November 29	vs. Wisconsin		Williams Arena • Minneapolis, Minnesota	W 6–1	8–3 (5–3 / 2–2)
December 3	vs. US National Team*		Williams Arena • Minneapolis, Minnesota	L 1–3	8–4 (5–3 / 2–2)
December 5	vs. North Dakota		Williams Arena • Minneapolis, Minnesota	W 4–2	9–4 (6–3 / 2–2)
December 6	vs. North Dakota		Williams Arena • Minneapolis, Minnesota	L 3–6	9–5 (6–4 / 2–2)
December 19	vs. Colorado College		Williams Arena • Minneapolis, Minnesota	W 6–2 ^{OT}	10–5 (7–4 / 2–2)
December 20	vs. Colorado College		Williams Arena • Minneapolis, Minnesota	W 3–2	11–5 (8–4 / 2–2)
December 27	at Saint Louis*		St. Louis Arena • St. Louis, Missouri	W 7–4	12–5 (8–4 / 2–2)
December 28	at Saint Louis*		St. Louis Arena • St. Louis, Missouri	W 7–5	13–5 (8–4 / 2–2)
January 2	vs. Michigan Tech		Williams Arena • Minneapolis, Minnesota	W 10–5	14–5 (9–4 / 2–2)
January 3	vs. Michigan Tech		Williams Arena • Minneapolis, Minnesota	L 2–8	14–6 (9–5 / 2–2)
January 9	at Notre Dame		Athletic & Convocation Center • Notre Dame, Indiana	W 6–3	15–6 (10–5 / 2–2)
January 10	at Notre Dame		Athletic & Convocation Center • Notre Dame, Indiana	T 4–4 ^{OT}	15–6–1 (10–5–1 / 2–2)
January 16	vs. Denver		Williams Arena • Minneapolis, Minnesota	W 3–1	16–6–1 (11–5–1 / 2–2)
January 17	vs. Denver		Williams Arena • Minneapolis, Minnesota	W 6–4	17–6–1 (12–5–1 / 2–2)
January 23	at Michigan		Yost Ice Arena • Ann Arbor, Michigan	L 3–7	17–7–1 (12–6–1 / 2–3)
January 24	at Michigan		Yost Ice Arena • Ann Arbor, Michigan	L 3–5	17–8–1 (12–7–1 / 2–4)
January 30	at Minnesota–Duluth		Duluth Arena Auditorium • Duluth, Minnesota	W 5–3	18–8–1 (13–7–1 / 2–4)
January 31	at Minnesota–Duluth		Duluth Arena Auditorium • Duluth, Minnesota	W 6–3	19–8–1 (14–7–1 / 2–4)
February 6	vs. Michigan State		Williams Arena • Minneapolis, Minnesota	L 2–4	19–9–1 (14–8–1 / 2–5)
February 7	vs. Michigan State		Williams Arena • Minneapolis, Minnesota	L 4–5 ^{OT}	19–10–1 (14–9–1 / 2–6)
February 13	vs. Wisconsin		Dane County Coliseum • Madison, Wisconsin	W 5–4 ^{OT}	20–10–1 (15–9–1 / 3–6)
February 14	vs. Wisconsin		Dane County Coliseum • Madison, Wisconsin	L 3–9	20–11–1 (15–10–1 / 3–7)
February 20	at Colorado College		Broadmoor World Arena • Colorado Springs, Colorado	W 4–1	21–11–1 (16–10–1 / 3–7)
February 21	at Colorado College		Broadmoor World Arena • Colorado Springs, Colorado	L 3–4	21–12–1 (16–11–1 / 3–7)
February 27	vs. Michigan		Williams Arena • Minneapolis, Minnesota	L 2–5	22–12–1 (17–11–1 / 4–7)
February 28	vs. Michigan		Williams Arena • Minneapolis, Minnesota	W 7–4	22–13–1 (17–12–1 / 4–8)
March 5	at North Dakota		Winter Sports Center • Grand Forks, North Dakota	W 5–3	23–13–1 (18–12–1 / 4–8)
March 6	at North Dakota		Winter Sports Center • Grand Forks, North Dakota	L 1–5	23–14–1 (18–13–1 / 4–8)
WCHA tournament
March 10	vs. Colorado College*		Williams Arena • Minneapolis, Minnesota (WCHA First Round Game 1)	W 5–1	24–14–1 (18–13–1 / 4–8)
March 11	vs. Colorado College*		Williams Arena • Minneapolis, Minnesota (WCHA First Round Game 2)	W 5–4	25–14–1 (18–13–1 / 4–8)
Minnesota Wins Series 12-5
March 13	at Michigan State*		Munn Ice Arena • East Lansing, Michigan (WCHA Second Round Game 1)	T 2–2 ^{OT}	25–14–2 (18–13–1 / 4–8)
March 14	at Michigan State*		Munn Ice Arena • East Lansing, Michigan (WCHA Second Round Game 2)	W 7–6 ^{3OT}	26–14–2 (18–13–1 / 4–8)
Minnesota Wins Series 9-8
NCAA tournament
March 14	vs. Boston University*		DU Arena • Denver, Colorado (National Semifinal)	W 4–2	27–14–2 (18–13–1 / 4–8)
March 15	vs. Michigan Tech*		DU Arena • Denver, Colorado (National championship)	W 4–2	28–14–2 (18–13–1 / 4–8)
*Non-conference game. ^{#}Rankings from USCHO.com Poll. Source:

== Roster and scoring statistics ==
No.	Player	Year	Position	Hometown	S/P/C	Games	Goals	Assists	Points	PIM
15	Tom Vannelli	Junior	C	Saint Paul, MN	(Minnesota)	44	26	43	69	72
10	Warren Miller	Senior	F	South Saint Paul, MN	(Minnesota)	44	26	31	57	52
11	Pat Phippen	Junior	LW	Roseville, MN	(Minnesota)	41	17	33	50	50
9	Tom Younghans	Sophomore	RW	Saint Paul, MN	(Minnesota)	44	19	24	43	94
26	Reed Larson	Sophomore	D	Minneapolis, MN	(Minnesota)	42	13	29	42	94
7	Don Madson	Freshman	C	Grand Rapids, MN	(Minnesota)	42	14	24	38	32
3	Joe Micheletti	Junior	D / C	International Falls, MN	(Minnesota)	33	7	24	31	46
18	Tom Gorence	Freshman	RW	Saint Paul, MN	(Minnesota)	40	16	10	26	24
6	Bill Baker	Freshman	D	Grand Rapids, MN	(Minnesota)	44	8	15	23	28
25	Daniel Bonk	Freshman	F	South Saint Paul, MN	(Minnesota)	42	7	15	22	32
22	Ken Yackel Jr.	Sophomore	RW	South Saint Paul, MN	(Minnesota)	37	9	6	15	39
21	Bruce Lind	Sophomore	D	Richfield, MN	(Minnesota)	42	5	10	15	73
14	Mark Lambert	Sophomore	C	Saint Paul, MN	(Minnesota)	44	6	8	14	22
4	Robin Larson	Sophomore	D	Roseville, MN	(Minnesota)	41	2	12	14	23
12	Phil Verchota	Freshman	LW	Duluth, MN	(Minnesota)	42	8	3	11	55
17	Russ Anderson	Sophomore	D	Minneapolis, MN	(Minnesota)	39	2	9	11	111
19	Bob Fish	Freshman	LW	Warroad, MN	(Minnesota)	24	3	3	6	2
2	Brad Morrow	Senior	D	Anoka, MN	(Minnesota)	27	1	3	4	8
24	Tim Rainey	Freshman	RW	Bloomington, MN	(Minnesota)	26	1	2	3	12
8	Tony Dorn	Freshman	D	Thief River Falls, MN	(Minnesota)	24	1	1	2	12
23	Bryan Fredrickson	Sophomore	RW	Minneapolis, MN	(Minnesota)	10	0	1	1	16
20	Jim Boo	Sophomore	D	Rolla, MO	(Missouri)	19	0	1	1	21
5	Joe Baker	Sophomore	D	White Bear Lake, MN	(Minnesota)	0	-	-	-	-
1	Steve Janaszak	Freshman	G	Saint Paul, MN	(Minnesota)	4	-	-	-	-
30	Tom Mohr	Junior	G	Hopkins, MN	(Minnesota)	12	-	-	-	-
35	Jeff Tscherne	Sophomore	G	Edina, MN	(Minnesota)	29	-	-	-	-
Total										

== Goaltending statistics ==
No.	Player	Games	Minutes	Wins	Losses	Ties	Goals against	Saves	Shut outs	SV %	GAA
30	Tom Mohr	12	733	8	3	1	33	316	0	.911	2.70
35	Jeff Tscherne	29	1783	19	9	1	104	864	0	.893	3.50
1	Steve Janaszak	4	238	1	2	0	21	75	0	.781	5.30
Total		44		28	14	2	158		0		

== 1976 championship game ==
=== (W1) Michigan Tech vs. (W2) Minnesota ===
March 27	Michigan Tech	4 – 6	Minnesota	University of Denver Arena

Scoring summary
Period	Team	Goal	Assist(s)	Time	Score
1st	MTU	Warren Young	Joelson, Dempsey	7:55	1–0 MTU
1st	MTU	Warren Young	Joelson and Decker	10:36	2–0 MTU
1st	MTU	Jim Murray	Jessee	11:31	3–0 MTU
1st	MIN	Tom Vannelli – PP	Younghans and Phippen	17:05	3–1 MTU
2nd	MIN	Joe Micheletti	Larson and Vannelli	22:55	3–2 MTU
2nd	MIN	Bill Baker	Vannelli and Phippen	30:26	3–3
2nd	MIN	Tom Gorence	Larson	32:47	4–3 MIN
2nd	MTU	Nels Goddard	Roberts and Zuke	39:24	4–4
3rd	MIN	Pat Phippen – GW	Vannelli and Larson	48:37	5–4 MIN
3rd	MIN	Warren Miller	Phippen and Vannelli	59:30	6–4 MIN

Shots by period
Team	1	2	3	T
Minnesota	8	16	11	35
Michigan Tech	12	3	9	24

Goaltenders
Team	Name	Saves	Goals against	Time on ice
MIN	Jeff Tscherne	9	3	
MIN	Tom Mohr	11	1	
MTU	Bruce Horsch	29	6	

== Players drafted into the NHL/WHA ==
=== 1976 NHL Amateur Draft ===
= NHL All-Star team	= NHL All-Star	= NHL All-Star and NHL All-Star team	= Did not play in the NHL

Round	Pick	Player	NHL team
2	22	Reed Larson	Detroit Red Wings
3	54	Bill Baker	Montreal Canadiens
5	75	Phil Verchota	Minnesota North Stars

=== 1976 WHA Amateur Draft ===
= Did not play in the WHA

Round	Pick	Player	WHA Team
5	49	Bill Baker	New England Whalers
