= 1976 NCAA Division I men's ice hockey tournament =

- Teams: 4
- Finals site: University of Denver Arena, Denver, Colorado
- Champions: Minnesota Golden Gophers (2nd title)
- Runner-up: Michigan Tech Huskies (7th title game)
- Semifinalists: Brown Bears (3rd Frozen Four); Boston University Terriers (11th Frozen Four)
- Winning coach: Herb Brooks (2nd title)
- MOP: Tom Vannelli (Minnesota)
- Attendance: 17,410

The 1976 NCAA Division I men's ice hockey tournament was the culmination of the 1975–76 NCAA Division I men's ice hockey season, the 29th such tournament in NCAA history. It was held between March 25 and 27, 1976, and concluded with Minnesota defeating Michigan Tech 6–4. All games were played at the University of Denver Arena in Denver, Colorado.

== Qualifying teams ==
Four teams qualified for the tournament, two each from the eastern and western regions. The ECAC tournament champion and the two WCHA tournament co-champions received automatic bids into the tournament. An at-large bid was offered to a second eastern team based upon both their ECAC tournament finish as well as their regular season record.

East							West						
Seed	School	Conference	Record	Berth type	Appearance	Last bid	Seed	School	Conference	Record	Berth type	Appearance	Last bid
1	Boston University	ECAC Hockey	25–3–0	Tournament champion	11th	1975	1	Michigan Tech	WCHA	33–8–0	Tournament co-champion	9th	1975
2	Brown	ECAC Hockey	22–6–0	At-Large	3rd	1965	2	Minnesota	WCHA	26–14–2	Tournament co-champion	7th	1975

== Format ==
The ECAC champion was seeded as the top eastern team while the WCHA co-champion with the better regular season record was given the top western seed. The second eastern seed was slotted to play the top western seed and vice versa. All games were played at the University of Denver Arena. All matches were Single-game eliminations with the semifinal winners advancing to the national championship game and the losers playing in a consolation game. Minnesota and Michigan Tech squared off in the championship game for the third straight year, with Michigan Tech having won in '75 and Minnesota in '74.

== Bracket ==
Semifinals; March 25–26
E1	Boston University	2
W2	Minnesota	4
W1	Michigan Tech	7**
E2	Brown	6

National championship March 27
W2	Minnesota	6
W1	Michigan Tech	4
Third-place game
E1	Boston University	7
E2	Brown	8

Note: * denotes overtime period(s)

== Results ==
=== Semifinals ===
March 25, 1976; 7:30 pm	(W1) Michigan Tech	7–6 (2OT) (3–2, 1–1, 2–3, 0–0, 1–0)	(E2) Brown	University of Denver Arena; Attendance: 4,479

Game reference

Bruce Horsch
Goalies
Kevin McCabe

(Murray, Letzgus) George Lyle – SH – 04:59	1 – 0
(Lyle, Mayer) Mike Zuke – PP – 06:23	2 – 0
	2 – 1	12:34 – PP – Bob McIntosh (Gilligan, Bennett)
(Zuke, Roberts) Jim Mayer – PP – 13:09	3 – 1
	3 – 2	17:38 – Skip Stovern (Ahern, Gilligan)
(unassisted) Mike Zuke – PP – 31:11	4 – 2
	4 – 3	36:12 – Mark Charest (Lucky, Roberts)
	4 – 4	44:57 – Bill Gilligan (Bennett, Ahern)
	4 – 5	47:17 – PP – Bill Gilligan (Stovern, McIntosh)
	4 – 6	51:40 – Bob McIntosh (Ahern, Gilligan)
(unassited) George Lyle – 55:50	5 – 6
(unassited) Dana Decker – 57:00	6 – 6
(Decker, Young) Dave Joelson – GW – 72:13	7 – 6

20 min
Penalties
12 min
49
Shots
50

March 26, 1976; 7:30 pm	(E1) Boston University	2–4 (0–0, 2–1, 0–3)	(W2) Minnesota	University of Denver Arena; Attendance: 5,204

Game reference

Brian Durocher
Goalies
Tom Mohr
Referees:
Dino Paniccia
Frank Kelly

	0 – 1	27:30 – Don Madson (Reed Larson, Miller)
(Brown, Marzo) Ken Kuzyk – PP – 28:07	1 – 1
(Fay, Brown) Mike Fidler – PP – 37:17	2 – 1
	2 – 2	44:38 – Tom Vannelli (Reed Larson)
	2 – 3	49:56 – GW – Mark Lambert (Yackel, Lind)
	2 – 4	57:22 – Tom Younghams (Vannelli, Phippen)

38 min
Penalties
42 min
31
Shots
40

=== Third Place Game ===
March 27, 1976	(E1) Boston University	7–8 (3–1, 3–4, 1–3)	(E2) Brown	University of Denver Arena; Attendance: 2,416

Game reference

Pat Devlin
Goalies
Mike Laycock

(Sunderland) Ken Kuzyk – 06:19	1 – 0
(R. Meagher, Kuzyk) Bill Robbins – 14:24	2 – 0
	2 – 1	15:03 – Wayne Lucky (Mastrullo, Colehour)
(Marden, O'Callahan) Marc Hetnik – 19:36	3 – 1
	3 – 2	20:17 – Wayne Lucky (Roberts)
(O'Callahan) Jerry Gryp – 20:50	4 – 2
	4 – 3	21:26 – John Ahern (Stovern)
	4 – 4	25:48 – Bob McIntosh (Stovern, Vezzosi)
(Buckton) Pete Marzo – 28:33	5 – 4
	5 – 5	32:13 – John Ahern (Bennett, Gilligan)
(Kuzyk, Robbins) Pete Marzo – 38:46	6 – 5
	6 – 6	44:27 – Paul Stevenson (Colehour, Roberts)
(Fay, Brown) Mike Fidler – 47:58	7 – 6
	7 – 7	55:50 – Mike Flanigan (McIntosh, Mars)
	7 – 8	56:49 – GW – Greg Vezzosi (unassisted)

42
Shots
41

=== National Championship ===
March 27, 1976; 7:30 pm	(W1) Michigan Tech	4–6 (3–1, 1–3, 0–2)	(W2) Minnesota	University of Denver Arena; Attendance: 5,311

Game reference
Referees: Bill Riley Jr. Medo Martinello

Scoring summary
Period	Team	Goal	Assist(s)	Time	Score
1st	MTU	Warren Young	Joelson, Dempsey	7:55	1–0 MTU
1st	MTU	Warren Young	Joelson and Decker	10:36	2–0 MTU
1st	MTU	Jim Murray	Jessee	11:31	3–0 MTU
1st	MIN	Tom Vannelli – PP	Younghans and Phippen	17:05	3–1 MTU
2nd	MIN	Joe Micheletti – PP	Larson and Vannelli	22:55	3–2 MTU
2nd	MIN	Bill Baker	Vannelli and Phippen	30:26	3–3
2nd	MIN	Tom Gorence	Reed Larson	32:47	4–3 MIN
2nd	MTU	Nels Goddard	Roberts and Zuke	39:24	4–4
3rd	MIN	Pat Phippen – GW	Vannelli and Reed Larson	48:37	5–4 MIN
3rd	MIN	Warren Miller	Phippen and Vannelli	59:30	6–4 MIN
Penalty summary
Period	Team	Player	Penalty	Time	PIM
1st	MTU	Warren Young	Slashing	2:08	2:00
1st	MTU	Jim Mayer	Roughing	6:47	2:00
1st	MIN	Joe Micheletti	Tripping	7:40	2:00
1st	MIN	Bench	Too many man (served by Tim Rainey)	8:27	2:00
1st	MTU	Pete Roberts	Elbowing	11:43	2:00
1st	MTU	Stu Ostlund	Tripping	13:55	2:00
1st	MTU	Jeff Wilcox	Slashing	16:28	2:00
1st	MIN	Tom Younghans	Roughing	18:57	2:00
1st	MTU	Stu Younger	Roughing	18:57	2:00
2nd	MTU	Steve Letzgus	Holding	21:11	2:00
2nd	MTU	Ed Dempsey	Elbowing	29:17	2:00
2nd	MIN	Joe Micheletti	Slashing	29:59	2:00
2nd	MIN	Bench	Too many men	35:49	2:00
3rd	none				

Shots by period
Team	1	2	3	T
Minnesota	8	16	11	35
Michigan Tech	12	3	9	24

Goaltenders
Team	Name	Saves	Goals against	Time on ice
MIN	Jeff Tscherne	9	3	20:00
MIN	Tom Mohr	11	1	
MTU	Bruce Horsch	29	6	

== All-Tournament team ==
None Selected

== Most Outstanding Player(s) ==
Tom Vannelli
