= Vannelli =

Vannelli is a surname. Notable people with the surname include:

- Gino Vannelli (born 1952), Italian-Canadian singer, songwriter, musician and composer
- Joe Vannelli (born 1950), Italian-Canadian musician, composer and record producer, elder brother of Gino and Ross (born 1956)
- Tom Vannelli (born 1955), American ice hockey player and coach
