= 1976 WCHA men's ice hockey tournament =

1976 WCHA Men's ice hockey tournament
- Dates: March 10–15, 1976
- Teams: 8
- Finals site: Munn Ice Arena; East Lansing, Michigan; Student Ice Arena; Houghton, Michigan
- Champions: Minnesota† (5th title); Michigan Tech‡ (8th title)
- Winning coach: Herb Brooks (3rd title); John MacInnes (8th title)
- WCHA Men's Ice Hockey Tournaments

The 1976 WCHA Men's Ice Hockey Tournament was the 17th conference playoff in league history. The tournament was played between March 10 and March 15, 1976. All games were played at home team campus sites, including each of the two regional final series. By winning the regional tournaments, both Minnesota and Michigan Tech were invited to participate in the 1976 NCAA Division I Men's Ice Hockey Tournament.

Though not official designations, Minnesota is considered as the East Regional Champion† and Michigan Tech as the West Regional Champion‡.

== Format ==
The top eight teams in the WCHA, according to their final conference standings, were eligible for the tournament and were seeded No. 1 through No. 8. In the first round the first and eighth seeds, the second and seventh seeds, the third and sixth seeds and the fourth and fifth seeds were matched in two-game series where the school that scored the higher number of goals was declared the winner. After the first round the remaining teams were reseeded No. 1 through No. 4 according to their final conference standings and advanced to the second round. In the second round the first and fourth seeds and the second and third seeds competed in an additional two-game, total goal series with the winners of each being declared as co-conference champions.

=== Conference standings ===
Note: GP = Games played; W = Wins; L = Losses; T = Ties; PTS = Points; GF = Goals For; GA = Goals Against

1975–76 Western Collegiate Hockey Association standings
	Conference							Overall					
	GP	W	L	T	PTS	GF	GA	GP	W	L	T	GF	GA
Michigan Tech†*	32	25	7	0	50	190	134	43	34	9	0	255	177
Michigan State	32	20	12	0	40	154	139	40	23	15	2	193	176
Minnesota*	32	18	13	1	37	129	119	44	28	14	2	190	158
Michigan	32	17	15	0	34	157	141	39	21	18	0	196	176
Notre Dame	32	15	15	2	32	143	140	38	19	17	2	171	173
Colorado College	32	15	16	1	31	131	133	38	15	22	1	151	181
Wisconsin	32	11	19	2	24	137	151	38	12	24	2	153	177
Denver	32	12	20	0	24	120	140	39	16	23	0	165	175
Minnesota-Duluth	32	12	20	0	24	132	160	36	15	21	0	159	179
North Dakota	32	12	20	0	24	119	155	36	15	21	0	142	168
Championship: Minnesota, Michigan Tech † indicates conference regular season champion * indicates conference tournament champion

== Bracket ==
Teams are reseeded after the first round

First Round; March 10–11
1	Michigan Tech	5	8
8	Denver	4	6
2	Michigan State	6	6
7	Wisconsin	4	4
3	Minnesota	7	5
6	Colorado College	4	1
4	Michigan	8	4
5	Notre Dame	3	5

Second Round; March 13–15
1	Michigan Tech	4	6
4	Michigan	2	5
2	Michigan State	2	6
3	Minnesota	2	7***

Note: * denotes overtime period(s)

=== First round ===
==== (1) Michigan Tech vs. (8) Denver ====
March 10	Michigan Tech	5 – 4	Denver	Student Ice Arena

March 11	Michigan Tech	8 – 6	Denver	Student Ice Arena

Michigan Tech won series 13–10

==== (2) Michigan State vs. (7) Wisconsin ====
March 10	Michigan State	6 – 4	Wisconsin	Munn Ice Arena

March 11	Michigan State	6 – 4	Wisconsin	Munn Ice Arena

Michigan State won series 12–8

==== (3) Minnesota vs. (6) Colorado College ====
March 10	Minnesota	7 – 4	Colorado College	Williams Arena

March 11	Minnesota	5 – 1	Colorado College	Williams Arena

Minnesota won series 12–5

==== (4) Michigan vs. (5) Notre Dame ====
March 10	Michigan	8 – 3	Notre Dame	Yost Ice Arena

March 11	Michigan	4 – 5	Notre Dame	Yost Ice Arena

Michigan won series 12–8

=== Second round ===
==== (1) Michigan Tech vs. (4) Michigan ====
March 14	Michigan Tech	4 – 2	Michigan	Student Ice Arena

March 15	Michigan Tech	6 – 5	Michigan	Student Ice Arena

Michigan Tech won series 10–7

==== (2) Michigan State vs. (3) Minnesota ====
March 13	Michigan State	2 – 2	Minnesota	Munn Ice Arena

March 14	Michigan State	6 – 7	3OT	Minnesota	Munn Ice Arena

Minnesota won series 9–8

== Tournament awards ==
None

== See also ==
- Western Collegiate Hockey Association men's champions
