= Ken Kuzyk =

Canadian ice hockey player

- Born: August 11, 1953 (age 72) Toronto, Ontario, Canada
- Height: 6 ft 1 in (185 cm)
- Weight: 194 lb (88 kg; 13 st 12 lb)
- Position: Right wing
- Shot: Right
- Played for: Cleveland Barons
- NHL draft: Undrafted
- Playing career: 1976–1983

Kenneth Michael Kuzyk (born August 11, 1953) is a Canadian former professional ice hockey forward who played 41 games in the National Hockey League (NHL) for the Cleveland Barons. As a youth, he played in the 1966 Quebec International Pee-Wee Hockey Tournament with the Toronto Shopsy's minor ice hockey team.

== Career statistics ==
=== Regular season and playoffs ===
			Regular season					Playoffs
Season	Team	League	GP	G	A	Pts	PIM	GP	G	A	Pts	PIM
1970–71	Markham Waxers	MTJHL	—	—	—	—	—	—	—	—	—	—
1972–73	Boston University	ECAC	28	10	15	25	8	—	—	—	—	—
1973–74	Boston University	ECAC	31	8	7	15	26	—	—	—	—	—
1974–75	Boston University	ECAC	32	8	16	24	46	—	—	—	—	—
1975–76	Boston University	ECAC	30	15	8	23	30	—	—	—	—	—
1976–77	Cleveland Barons	NHL	13	0	5	5	2	—	—	—	—	—
1976–77	Salt Lake Golden Eagles	CHL	62	33	27	60	10	—	—	—	—	—
1977–78	Cleveland Barons	NHL	28	5	4	9	6	—	—	—	—	—
1977–78	Binghamton Dusters	AHL	14	1	1	2	2	—	—	—	—	—
1977–78	Phoenix Roadrunners	CHL	17	10	11	21	2	—	—	—	—	—
1977–78	Salt Lake Golden Eagles	CHL	14	4	8	12	0	6	1	0	1	0
1978–79	Tulsa Oilers	CHL	74	31	32	63	22	—	—	—	—	—
1979–80	Cincinnati Stingers	CHL	17	3	7	10	0	—	—	—	—	—
1979–80	Baltimore Clippers	EHL	1	0	0	0	0	—	—	—	—	—
1979–80	Oklahoma City Stars	CHL	41	10	12	22	11	—	—	—	—	—
1980–81	EHC Krefeld	GER-2	40	32	24	56	64	—	—	—	—	—
1981–82	Krefelder EV 1981	GER-2	23	25	22	47	40	—	—	—	—	—
1982–83	Krefelder EV 1981	GER-2	24	25	20	45	86	—	—	—	—	—
1982–83	Tulsa Oilers	CHL	48	28	16	44	4	—	—	—	—	—
CHL totals			273	119	113	232	49	6	1	0	1	0
NHL totals			41	5	9	14	8	—	—	—	—	—
