= 1976 ECAC Hockey men's ice hockey tournament =

1976 ECAC Men's ice hockey tournament
- Dates: March 9–13, 1976
- Teams: 8
- Finals site: Boston Garden; Boston, Massachusetts
- Champions: Boston University (4th title)
- Winning coach: Jack Parker (3rd title)
- MVP: Terry Meagher (Boston University)
- ECAC Men's Ice Hockey Tournaments

The 1976 ECAC Hockey Men's Ice Hockey Tournament was the 15th tournament in league history. It was played between March 9 and March 13, 1976. Quarterfinal games were played at home team campus sites, while the 'final four' games were played at the Boston Garden in Boston, Massachusetts. By reaching the championship game both, Boston University and Brown received invitations to participate in the 1976 NCAA Division I Men's Ice Hockey Tournament.

== Format ==
The tournament featured three rounds of play, all of which were single-elimination. The top eight teams, based on winning percentage, qualified to participate in the tournament. In the quarterfinals the first seed and eighth seed, the second seed and seventh seed, the third seed and sixth seed and the fourth seed and fifth seed played against one another. In the semifinals, the highest seed plays the lowest remaining seed while the two remaining teams play with the winners advancing to the championship game and the losers advancing to the third place game.

== Conference standings ==
Note: GP = Games played; W = Wins; L = Losses; T = Ties; Pct. = Winning percentage; GF = Goals for; GA = Goals against

1975–76 ECAC Hockey standings
| | Conference | | | | | | | Overall | | | | | |
| | GP | W | L | T | Pct. | GF | GA | GP | W | L | T | GF | GA |
|---|---|---|---|---|---|---|---|---|---|---|---|---|---|
| Boston University†* | 23 | 21 | 2 | 0 | .915 | 141 | 77 | 30 | 25 | 5 | 0 | 182 | 108 |
| New Hampshire | 28 | 22 | 6 | 0 | .786 | 163 | 97 | 31 | 24 | 7 | 0 | 184 | 108 |
| Brown | 23 | 18 | 5 | 0 | .783 | 149 | 90 | 30 | 23 | 7 | 0 | 186 | 126 |
| Clarkson | 25 | 16 | 8 | 1 | .660 | 135 | 114 | 31 | 18 | 12 | 1 | 170 | 146 |
| Cornell | 23 | 13 | 9 | 1 | .587 | 127 | 98 | 29 | 18 | 10 | 1 | 174 | 128 |
| Dartmouth | 24 | 14 | 10 | 0 | .583 | 123 | 112 | 27 | 16 | 11 | 0 | 140 | 123 |
| Harvard | 20 | 10 | 7 | 3 | .575 | 101 | 89 | 26 | 13 | 10 | 3 | 134 | 125 |
| Boston College | 21 | 11 | 9 | 1 | .548 | 115 | 96 | 29 | 15 | 13 | 1 | 158 | 135 |
| Providence | 25 | 11 | 12 | 2 | .480 | 132 | 111 | 31 | 14 | 15 | 2 | 171 | 141 |
| Rensselaer | 23 | 9 | 12 | 2 | .435 | 123 | 121 | 28 | 13 | 13 | 2 | 153 | 143 |
| Vermont | 22 | 9 | 13 | 0 | .409 | 102 | 112 | 32 | 15 | 16 | 1 | 179 | 160 |
| St. Lawrence | 19 | 7 | 11 | 1 | .395 | 87 | 102 | 27 | 11 | 17 | 1 | 128 | 144 |
| Colgate | 20 | 6 | 14 | 0 | .300 | 88 | 126 | 25 | 9 | 16 | 0 | 117 | 153 |
| Northeastern | 23 | 6 | 16 | 1 | .283 | 93 | 124 | 26 | 9 | 16 | 1 | 117 | 133 |
| Princeton | 23 | 6 | 16 | 1 | .283 | 76 | 135 | 24 | 7 | 16 | 1 | 86 | 138 |
| Pennsylvania | 23 | 5 | 17 | 1 | .239 | 85 | 141 | 26 | 6 | 19 | 1 | 107 | 163 |
| Yale | 21 | 1 | 20 | 0 | .048 | 68 | 166 | 25 | 4 | 21 | 0 | 91 | 189 |
Championship: Boston University † indicates conference regular season champion * indicates conference tournament champion

== Bracket ==
Teams are reseeded after the first round

Quarterfinals; March 9
1 | Boston University | 6
8 | Boston College | 5
2 | New Hampshire | 3
7 | Harvard | 4
3 | Brown | 5*
6 | Dartmouth | 4
4 | Clarkson | 7
5 | Cornell | 9

Semifinals; March 12
1 | Boston University | 8
7 | Harvard | 4
3 | Brown | 6
5 | Cornell | 2

Championship; March 13
1 | Boston University | 9
3 | Brown | 2
Third Place
5 | Cornell | 7
7 | Harvard | 6

Note: * denotes overtime period(s)

=== Quarterfinals ===
==== (1) Boston University vs. (8) Boston College ====
| March 9 | Boston University | 6 – 5 | Boston College | Walter Brown Arena |

==== (2) New Hampshire vs. (7) Harvard ====
| March 9 | New Hampshire | 3 – 4 | Harvard | Snively Arena |

==== (3) Brown vs. (6) Dartmouth ====
| March 9 | Brown | 5 – 4 | OT | Dartmouth | Meehan Auditorium |

==== (4) Clarkson vs. (5) Cornell ====
| March 8 | Clarkson | 8 – 7 | Cornell | Walker Arena |

=== Semifinals ===
==== (1) Boston University vs. (7) Harvard ====
| March 12 | Boston University | 8 – 4 | Harvard | Boston Garden |

==== (3) Brown vs. (5) Cornell ====
| March 12 | Brown | 6 – 2 | Cornell | Boston Garden |

=== Third Place ===
==== (5) Cornell vs. (7) Harvard ====
| March 13 | Cornell | 7 – 6 | Harvard | Boston Garden |

=== Championship ===
==== (1) Boston University vs. (3) Brown ====
| March 13 | Boston University | 9 – 2 | Brown | Boston Garden |

== Tournament awards ==
=== All-Tournament Team ===
None

=== MOP ===
- Terry Meagher (Boston University)
