= Tom Younghans =

American ice hockey player (born 1953)

- Born: January 22, 1953 (age 72) Saint Paul, Minnesota, U.S.
- Height: 5 ft 11 in (180 cm)
- Weight: 175 lb (79 kg; 12 st 7 lb)
- Position: Right wing
- Shot: Right
- Played for: Minnesota North Stars; New York Rangers
- National team: United States
- NHL draft: Undrafted
- Playing career: 1976–1982

Thomas Anthony Younghans (born January 22, 1953) is an American former professional ice hockey player who played 429 games in the National Hockey League (NHL) for the Minnesota North Stars and New York Rangers between 1976 and 1982.

He was a member of the University of Minnesota hockey team before turning professional, winning the national championship in 1976. Internationally Younghans played for the United States at the 1976, 1977 and 1978 World Championships as well as the 1981 Canada Cup tournament.

== Career statistics ==
=== Regular season and playoffs ===
			Regular season					Playoffs
Season	Team	League	GP	G	A	Pts	PIM	GP	G	A	Pts	PIM
1971–72	St. Mary's University	NCAA III	—	—	—	—	—	—	—	—	—	—
1972–73	St. Mary's University	NCAA III	20	13	24	37	—	—	—	—	—	—
1974–75	University of Minnesota	WCHA	22	13	15	28	22	—	—	—	—	—
1975–76	University of Minnesota	WCHA	44	19	24	43	94	—	—	—	—	—
1976–77	Minnesota North Stars	NHL	78	8	6	14	35	2	0	0	0	0
1977–78	Minnesota North Stars	NHL	72	10	8	18	100	—	—	—	—	—
1977–78	Fort Worth Texans	CHL	6	3	2	5	2	—	—	—	—	—
1978–79	Minnesota North Stars	NHL	76	8	10	18	50	—	—	—	—	—
1979–80	Minnesota North Stars	NHL	79	10	6	16	92	15	2	1	3	17
1980–81	Minnesota North Stars	NHL	74	4	6	10	79	5	0	0	0	4
1981–82	Springfield Indians	AHL	7	4	0	4	16	—	—	—	—	—
1981–82	Minnesota North Stars	NHL	3	1	0	1	0	—	—	—	—	—
1981–82	New York Rangers	NHL	47	3	5	8	17	2	0	0	0	0
1981–82	Memphis South Stars	CHL	5	5	3	8	2	—	—	—	—	—
NHL totals			429	44	41	85	373	24	2	1	3	21

=== International ===
Year	Team	Event	GP	G	A	Pts	PIM
1976	United States	WC	10	2	2	4	8
1977	United States	WC	10	0	4	4	8
1978	United States	WC	10	2	1	3	6
1981	United States	CC	4	0	0	0	0
Senior totals			34	4	7	12	22
