= Bill Gilligan =

American ice hockey coach

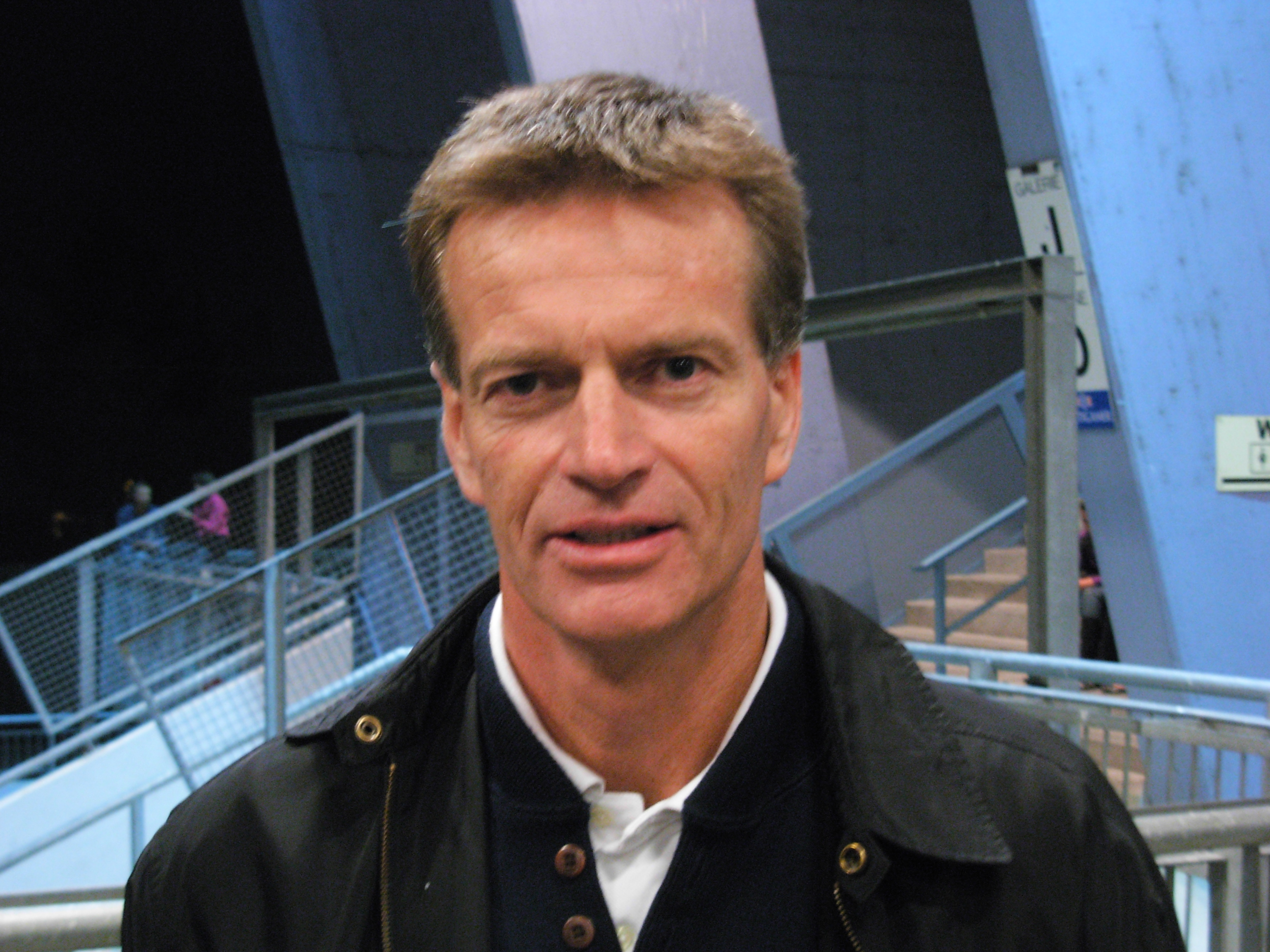
- Born: August 5, 1954 (age 71) Beverly, Massachusetts, U.S.
- Height: 5 ft 11 in (180 cm)
- Weight: 175 lb (79 kg; 12 st 7 lb)
- Position: Right wing
- Shot: Right
- Played for: Cincinnati Stingers
- National team: United States
- WHA draft: Undrafted
- Playing career: 1977–1982

Bill Gilligan (born August 5, 1954) is an American professional ice hockey coach. He is also a former professional ice hockey winger who played in 128 World Hockey Association regular season games with the Cincinnati Stingers between 1977 and 1979 before moving to Europe.

== Playing career ==
In addition to the WHA Stingers, Bill Gilligan played for Brown University (NCAA), Hampton Gulls (AHL), Vienna EV and Klagenfurt AC in Austria and EHC Chur in Switzerland. He was also a member of Team USA in the 1978 and 1983 Ice Hockey World Championship tournaments.

== Coaching career ==
He first became coach in 1984 in Klagenfurt, Austria, where he won 4 Championships in a row right away. From season 1988/89 to season 1991/1992 Gilligan was head coach of Swiss ice hockey team SC Bern. He won 3 NLA Championships and was one time runners up in 4 years. He later was head coach of the Swiss U-20 national ice hockey team and together with John Sletvoll also of the Swiss national team. From 1994 - 1998, Gilligan was Sports Director of SC Bern and then returned to the US to work as assistant coach for the hockey team of University of Massachusetts Amherst, the Massachusetts Minutemen and as a scout for NHL team Los Angeles Kings.

For season 2005/06 he came back to Switzerland as head coach for NLA team Rapperswil-Jona Lakers. He is also the team's head coach for 2006/07 season.

In 2008 was named as Head Coach from Graz 99ers, in the 2009/2010 season Graz won the playoff qualification for the first time. Gilligan additionally coached the Austria national team in 2008-2011. In 2014, Gilligan was named Associate Coach of Merrimack College in North Andover, Massachusetts.

== Career statistics ==
=== Regular season and playoffs ===
			Regular season					Playoffs
Season	Team	League	GP	G	A	Pts	PIM	GP	G	A	Pts	PIM
1974–75	Brown University	ECAC	25	20	22	42	12	—	—	—	—	—
1975–76	Brown University	ECAC	30	25	54	79	10	—	—	—	—	—
1976–77	Brown University	ECAC	26	23	36	59	39	—	—	—	—	—
1977–78	Hampton Gulls	AHL	18	10	11	21	18	—	—	—	—	—
1977–78	Cincinnati Stingers	WHA	54	10	14	24	59	—	—	—	—	—
1978–79	Cincinnati Stingers	WHA	74	17	26	43	54	3	1	0	1	0
1979–80	Vienna	Austria	40	67	64	131	63	—	—	—	—	—
1980–81	Austria	Intl	34	45	44	89	37	—	—	—	—	—
1981–82	Vienna	Austria	––	30	23	53	0	—	—	—	—	—
WHA totals			128	27	40	67	113	3	1	0	1	0

== Awards and honors ==
=== Playing ===
Award	Year
All-ECAC Hockey Second Team	1975–76
AHCA East All-American	1975–76

=== Coaching ===
- 1985 - Austrian Champion with Klagenfurt AC
- 1986 - Austrian Champion with Klagenfurt AC
- 1987 - Austrian Champion with Klagenfurt AC
- 1988 - Austrian Champion with Klagenfurt AC
- 1989 - NLA Champion with SC Bern
- 1991 - NLA Champion with SC Bern
- 1992 - NLA Champion with SC Bern
