= Jim Boo =

American ice hockey player

- Born: November 12, 1954 (age 71) Rolla, Missouri, U.S.
- Height: 6 ft 1 in (185 cm)
- Weight: 200 lb (91 kg; 14 st 4 lb)
- Position: Defense
- Shot: Right
- Played for: Minnesota North Stars
- NHL draft: Undrafted
- Playing career: 1978–1980

James McQuaid Boo (born November 12, 1954) is an American former ice hockey defenseman. He played 6 games in the National Hockey League with the Minnesota North Stars during the 1977–78 season. The rest of his career, which lasted from 1978 to 1980, was spent in the Central Hockey League.

== Career ==
Although he was born in Missouri, Boo grew up in Mahtomedi, Minnesota. Boo played junior hockey for the Mahtomedi High School team before joining the University of Minnesota Golden Gophers. He was part of the team that won the 1976 NCAA Men's Ice Hockey Championship.

The Minnesota North Stars of the National Hockey League signed Boo to a free-agent contract during the 1977–78 season. He played six games for the team. For the next two seasons, Boo played for the Central Hockey League Oklahoma City Stars. He retired from ice hockey following the 1980 season.

After his hockey career ended, Boo began working in the real estate industry, eventually forming his own company, Team Boo Realty with his wife, Tracy. Boo is also involved with High Pointe Realty, another Minnesota-based real estate firm.

== Career statistics ==
=== Regular season and playoffs ===
			Regular season					Playoffs
Season	Team	League	GP	G	A	Pts	PIM	GP	G	A	Pts	PIM
1973–74	St. Paul Vulcans	MidJHL	—	—	—	—	—	—	—	—	—	—
1974–75	University of Minnesota	B1G	—	—	—	—	—	—	—	—	—	—
1975–76	University of Minnesota	B1G	19	0	1	1	21	—	—	—	—	—
1976–77	University of Minnesota	B1G	37	2	10	12	66	—	—	—	—	—
1977–78	University of Minnesota	B1G	37	4	17	21	53	—	—	—	—	—
1977–78	Minnesota North Stars	NHL	6	0	0	0	22	—	—	—	—	—
1977–78	Fort Worth Texans	CHL	9	0	2	2	17	9	0	1	1	23
1978–79	Oklahoma City Stars	CHL	71	2	19	21	170	—	—	—	—	—
1979–80	Oklahoma City Stars	CHL	54	3	14	17	124	—	—	—	—	—
CHL totals			134	5	35	40	311	9	0	1	1	23
NHL totals			6	0	0	0	22	—	—	—	—	—
