= John Barrett (ice hockey) =

Canadian ice hockey player (born 1958)

- Born: July 1, 1958 (age 67) Ottawa, Ontario, Canada
- Height: 6 ft 0 in (183 cm)
- Weight: 210 lb (95 kg; 15 st 0 lb)
- Position: Defence
- Shot: Left
- Played for: Detroit Red Wings; Washington Capitals; Minnesota North Stars
- NHL draft: 129th overall, 1978; Detroit Red Wings
- Playing career: 1980–1988

John David Barrett (born July 1, 1958) is a Canadian retired ice hockey player.

== Career ==
A defenceman, Barrett was selected in the 1978 NHL entry draft by the Detroit Red Wings with whom he spent most of his NHL career. His older brother Fred was also an NHL defenceman. Both of their careers were cut short by injuries. Following repeated kneecap breaks, John retired after 488 NHL games, recording 20 goals, 77 assists, (97 points), and 604 penalty minutes.

As a youth, he played in the 1970 Quebec International Pee-Wee Hockey Tournament with a minor ice hockey team from Gloucester, Ontario.

== Career statistics ==
			Regular season					Playoffs
Season	Team	League	GP	G	A	Pts	PIM	GP	G	A	Pts	PIM
1976–77	Windsor Spitfires	OMJHL	63	7	17	24	168	9	1	1	2	12
1977–78	Windsor Spitfires	OMJHL	67	8	18	26	133	6	2	1	3	30
1978–79	Milwaukee Admirals	IHL	42	8	13	21	117	—	—	—	—	—
1978–79	Kalamazoo Wings	IHL	31	1	12	13	54	15	2	11	13	48
1979–80	Kalamazoo Wings	IHL	52	8	33	41	63	—	—	—	—	—
1979–80	Adirondack Red Wings	AHL	28	0	4	4	59	5	1	2	3	6
1980–81	Detroit Red Wings	NHL	56	3	10	13	60	—	—	—	—	—
1980–81	Adirondack Red Wings	AHL	21	4	11	15	63	—	—	—	—	—
1981–82	Detroit Red Wings	NHL	69	1	12	13	93	—	—	—	—	—
1982–83	Detroit Red Wings	NHL	79	4	10	14	74	—	—	—	—	—
1983–84	Detroit Red Wings	NHL	78	2	8	10	78	4	0	0	0	4
1984–85	Detroit Red Wings	NHL	71	6	19	25	117	3	0	1	1	11
1985–86	Detroit Red Wings	NHL	65	2	12	14	125	—	—	—	—	—
1985–86	Washington Capitals	NHL	14	0	3	3	12	9	2	1	3	35
1986–87	Washington Capitals	NHL	55	2	2	4	43	—	—	—	—	—
1987–88	Minnesota North Stars	NHL	1	0	1	1	2	—	—	—	—	—
1987–88	Binghamton Whalers	AHL	5	0	2	2	6	—	—	—	—	—
1987–88	Kalamazoo Wings	IHL	2	0	1	1	2	—	—	—	—	—
NHL totals			488	20	77	97	604	16	2	2	4	50
