= Fred Barrett (ice hockey) =

Canadian ice hockey player

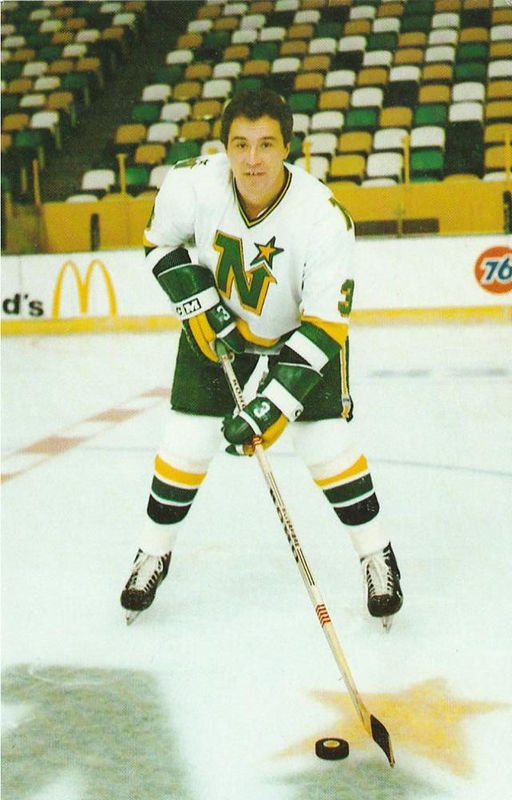
- Born: January 26, 1950 (age 76) Ottawa, Ontario, Canada
- Height: 5 ft 11 in (180 cm)
- Weight: 195 lb (88 kg; 13 st 13 lb)
- Position: Defence
- Shot: Left
- Played for: Minnesota North Stars; Los Angeles Kings
- NHL draft: 20th overall, 1970; Minnesota North Stars
- Playing career: 1970–1984

Frederick William Barrett (born January 26, 1950) is a Canadian former professional ice hockey defenceman who played 745 games in the National Hockey League with the Minnesota North Stars and Los Angeles Kings between 1970 and 1984.

== Career ==
During his career in the NHL, Barrett played for the Minnesota North Stars and Los Angeles Kings.

== Personal life ==
Barrett's brother, John Barrett, also played in the NHL. The Fred Barrett Arena, in his hometown of Ottawa, was named after his father, who had been mayor of Gloucester, Ontario.

== Career statistics ==
=== Regular season and playoffs ===
			Regular season					Playoffs
Season	Team	League	GP	G	A	Pts	PIM	GP	G	A	Pts	PIM
1965–66	Ottawa Junior Canadians	OHA-B	—	—	—	—	—	—	—	—	—	—
1965–66	Ottawa Capitals	CJHL	2	0	0	0	0	—	—	—	—	—
1966–67	Ottawa Capitals	CJHL	—	—	—	—	—	—	—	—	—	—
1966–67	Toronto Marlboros	OHA	2	0	0	0	2	9	0	0	0	2
1967–68	Toronto Marlboros	OHA	51	5	8	13	98	5	0	0	0	22
1968–69	Toronto Marlboros	OHA	52	3	17	20	113	6	1	2	3	15
1969–70	Toronto Marlboros	OHA	48	8	20	28	146	15	3	5	8	45
1970–71	Minnesota North Stars	NHL	57	0	13	13	75	—	—	—	—	—
1971–72	Cleveland Barons	AHL	51	2	27	29	91	1	0	0	0	2
1972–73	Minnesota North Stars	NHL	46	2	4	6	21	6	0	0	0	4
1973–74	Minnesota North Stars	NHL	40	0	7	7	12	—	—	—	—	—
1974–75	Minnesota North Stars	NHL	62	3	18	21	82	—	—	—	—	—
1975–76	Minnesota North Stars	NHL	79	2	9	11	66	—	—	—	—	—
1976–77	Minnesota North Stars	NHL	60	1	8	9	46	2	0	0	0	2
1977–78	Minnesota North Stars	NHL	79	0	15	15	59	—	—	—	—	—
1978–79	Minnesota North Stars	NHL	45	1	9	10	48	—	—	—	—	—
1979–80	Minnesota North Stars	NHL	80	8	14	22	71	14	0	0	0	22
1980–81	Minnesota North Stars	NHL	62	4	8	12	72	14	0	1	1	16
1981–82	Minnesota North Stars	NHL	69	1	15	16	89	4	0	1	1	16
1982–83	Minnesota North Stars	NHL	51	1	3	4	22	4	0	0	0	0
1983–84	Los Angeles Kings	NHL	15	2	0	2	8	—	—	—	—	—
NHL totals			745	25	123	148	671	44	0	2	2	60
