= Bill Baker (ice hockey, born 1956) =

American ice hockey player

- Born: November 29, 1956 (age 69) Grand Rapids, Minnesota, U.S.
- Height: 6 ft 1 in (185 cm)
- Weight: 192 lb (87 kg; 13 st 10 lb)
- Position: Defense
- Shot: Left
- Played for: Montreal Canadiens; Colorado Rockies; St. Louis Blues; New York Rangers
- National team: United States
- NHL draft: 54th overall, 1976; Montreal Canadiens
- WHA draft: 49th overall, 1973; New England Whalers
- Playing career: 1979–1984
Medal record
Men's ice hockey
Representing the United States
Olympic Games
Gold medal – first place	1980 Lake Placid	Team

William Robert Baker (born November 29, 1956) is an American former professional ice hockey defenseman who played 143 regular season games in the National Hockey League (NHL) for the Montreal Canadiens, Colorado Rockies, St. Louis Blues and New York Rangers between 1980 and 1983.

== Playing career ==
=== College career ===
Bill Baker attended the University of Minnesota and was team captain for the 1978-1979 season. He was originally selected 54th overall by the Montreal Canadiens in the 1976 NHL entry draft. Baker is best known for being a member of the Miracle on Ice 1980 U.S. Olympic Hockey Team that won the Gold Medal in Lake Placid, NY. Specifically, he is known for scoring the tying goal as the extra skater in the final minute forcing a 2–2 tie with Sweden in the opening game. This tie allowed the team to eventually advance to the medal round. Baker's jersey from the famed "Miracle On Ice" is on display at the Smithsonian in Washington, D.C., U.S. along with a stick autographed by all the members of the team.

=== Professional career ===
He joined the Canadiens after the Olympics, and was later traded to the Colorado Rockies in 1981. He also played for Team USA at the 1981 Ice Hockey World Championship and 1981 Canada Cup tournaments. Colorado later traded him to the St. Louis Blues in exchange for Joe Micheletti and Dick Lamby. Baker spent the full 1982–83 season with the New York Rangers. He spent the 1983-84 season in the CHL playing for the eventual league championships, the Tulsa Oilers coached by Tom Webster. He played 59 regular season games for Tulsa Oilers, but was not with team during post-season.

== Awards and achievements ==
Award	Year
All-WCHA First Team	1978–79
AHCA West All-American	1978–79

- CHL Adams Cup: 1984 (Tulsa Oilers)

== International play ==
- 1980 Winter Olympics, Lake Placid, New York
- Ice Hockey World Championships, 1979 and 1981
- 1981 Canada Cup

== In popular culture ==
In a 1981 TV movie about the gold medal-winning hockey team entitled Miracle on Ice, Baker is played by David Wallace.

In the 2004 Disney film Miracle, he is portrayed by Nick Postle.

== Career statistics ==
=== Regular season and playoffs ===
			Regular season					Playoffs
Season	Team	League	GP	G	A	Pts	PIM	GP	G	A	Pts	PIM
1972–73	Grand Rapids High School	High-MN	—	—	—	—	—	—	—	—	—	—
1973–74	Grand Rapids High School	High-MN	—	—	—	—	—	—	—	—	—	—
1975–76	University of Minnesota	WCHA	44	8	15	23	28	—	—	—	—	—
1976–77	University of Minnesota	WCHA	28	0	8	8	42	—	—	—	—	—
1977–78	University of Minnesota	WCHA	38	10	23	33	24	—	—	—	—	—
1978–79	University of Minnesota	WCHA	44	12	42	54	38	—	—	—	—	—
1979–80	United States	Intl.	60	5	25	30	74	—	—	—	—	—
1979–80	Nova Scotia Voyageurs	AHL	12	4	8	12	5	1	0	1	1	0
1980–81	Montreal Canadiens	NHL	11	0	0	0	32	—	—	—	—	—
1980–81	Nova Scotia Voyageurs	AHL	18	5	12	17	42	—	—	—	—	—
1980–81	Colorado Rockies	NHL	13	0	3	3	12	—	—	—	—	—
1981–82	Colorado Rockies	NHL	14	0	3	3	17	—	—	—	—	—
1981–82	St. Louis Blues	NHL	35	3	5	8	50	4	0	0	0	0
1981–82	Fort Worth Texans	CHL	10	3	12	15	20	—	—	—	—	—
1982–83	New York Rangers	NHL	70	4	14	18	64	2	0	0	0	0
1983–84	Tulsa Oilers	CHL	59	11	22	33	47	—	—	—	—	—
NHL totals			143	7	25	32	175	6	0	0	0	0

=== International ===
Year	Team	Event	GP	G	A	Pts	PIM
1979	United States	WC	7	2	1	3	2
1980	United States	OG	7	1	0	1	4
1981	United States	WC	7	0	1	1	8
1981	United States	CC	1	0	0	0	0
Senior totals			22	3	2	5	14
