= 1975–76 NCAA Division I men's ice hockey season =

- Duration: October 1975– March 27, 1976
- NCAA tournament: 1976
- National championship: University of Denver Arena; Denver, Colorado
- NCAA champion: Minnesota

The 1975–76 NCAA Division I men's ice hockey season began in October 1975 and concluded with the 1976 NCAA Division I Men's Ice Hockey Tournament's championship game on March 27, 1976 at the University of Denver Arena in Denver, Colorado. This was the 29th season in which an NCAA ice hockey championship was held and is the 82nd year overall where an NCAA school fielded a team.

== Season Outlook ==
=== Pre-season poll ===
The top teams in the nation voted on by coaches before the start of the season. The poll was compiled by radio station WMPL.

WMPL Poll
Rank	Team
1	Minnesota
2	Michigan
3	Boston University
4	Michigan Tech
5	Michigan State
6	Cornell
7	Minnesota Duluth
8	Colorado College
9	Harvard
10	Vermont

== Regular season ==
=== Season tournaments ===
Tournament	Dates	Teams	Champion
Utica Invitational	November 27–28	4	New Hampshire
North Country Thanksgiving Festival	November 27–29	4	Concordia
Syracuse Invitational	December 26–27	4	Clarkson
Rensselaer Holiday Tournament	December 27–29	4	Providence
Great Lakes Invitational	December 29–30	4	Michigan
Blue–Green Invitational	January 2–3	4	New Hampshire
ECAC Holiday Hockey Festival	January 2–4	4	Clarkson
Yale–SAAB Tournament	January 9–10	4	New Hampshire
Concordia Invitational	January 14–15	4	
Beanpot	February 2, 9	4	Boston College

=== Standings ===
1975–76 Big Ten standings
	Conference							Overall					
	GP	W	L	T	PTS	GF	GA	GP	W	L	T	GF	GA
Michigan State†	12	9	3	0	18	57	49	40	23	15	2	193	176
Michigan	12	8	4	0	16	69	52	39	21	18	0	196	176
Minnesota	12	4	8	0	8	42	53	44	28	14	2	190	158
Wisconsin	12	3	9	0	6	49	63	38	12	24	2	153	177
† indicates conference regular season champion

1975–76 Central Collegiate Hockey Association standings
	Conference							Overall					
	GP	W	L	T	PTS	GF	GA	GP	W	L	T	GF	GA
Bowling Green†	16	11	4	1	23	80	44	32	21	9	2	198	90
Saint Louis*	16	10	5	1	21	76	51	41	24	15	2	193	139
Lake Superior State	16	9	7	0	18	59	55	37	20	16	1	185	172
Western Michigan	16	6	10	0	12	62	75	34	18	14	2	176	158
Ohio State	16	3	13	0	6	49	101	34	18	15	1	213	155
Championship: Saint Louis † indicates conference regular season champion * indicates conference tournament champion

1975–76 ECAC Hockey standings
	Conference							Overall					
	GP	W	L	T	Pct.	GF	GA	GP	W	L	T	GF	GA
Boston University†*	23	21	2	0	.915	141	77	30	25	5	0	182	108
New Hampshire	28	22	6	0	.786	163	97	31	24	7	0	184	108
Brown	23	18	5	0	.783	149	90	30	23	7	0	186	126
Clarkson	25	16	8	1	.660	135	114	31	18	12	1	170	146
Cornell	23	13	9	1	.587	127	98	29	18	10	1	174	128
Dartmouth	24	14	10	0	.583	123	112	27	16	11	0	140	123
Harvard	20	10	7	3	.575	101	89	26	13	10	3	134	125
Boston College	21	11	9	1	.548	115	96	29	15	13	1	158	135
Providence	25	11	12	2	.480	132	111	31	14	15	2	171	141
Rensselaer	23	9	12	2	.435	123	121	28	13	13	2	153	143
Vermont	22	9	13	0	.409	102	112	32	15	16	1	179	160
St. Lawrence	19	7	11	1	.395	87	102	27	11	17	1	128	144
Colgate	20	6	14	0	.300	88	126	25	9	16	0	117	153
Northeastern	23	6	16	1	.283	93	124	26	9	16	1	117	133
Princeton	23	6	16	1	.283	76	135	24	7	16	1	86	138
Pennsylvania	23	5	17	1	.239	85	141	26	6	19	1	107	163
Yale	21	1	20	0	.048	68	166	25	4	21	0	91	189
Championship: Boston University † indicates conference regular season champion * indicates conference tournament champion

1975–76 NCAA Division I Independent ice hockey standings
	Conference							Overall					
	GP	W	L	T	PTS	GF	GA	GP	W	L	T	GF	GA
Air Force	0	0	0	0	-	-	-	26	16	10	0	160	145

1975–76 Western Collegiate Hockey Association standings
	Conference							Overall					
	GP	W	L	T	PTS	GF	GA	GP	W	L	T	GF	GA
Michigan Tech†*	32	25	7	0	50	190	134	43	34	9	0	255	177
Michigan State	32	20	12	0	40	154	139	40	23	15	2	193	176
Minnesota*	32	18	13	1	37	129	119	44	28	14	2	190	158
Michigan	32	17	15	0	34	157	141	39	21	18	0	196	176
Notre Dame	32	15	15	2	32	143	140	38	19	17	2	171	173
Colorado College	32	15	16	1	31	131	133	38	15	22	1	151	181
Wisconsin	32	11	19	2	24	137	151	38	12	24	2	153	177
Denver	32	12	20	0	24	120	140	39	16	23	0	165	175
Minnesota-Duluth	32	12	20	0	24	132	160	36	15	21	0	159	179
North Dakota	32	12	20	0	24	119	155	36	15	21	0	142	168
Championship: Minnesota, Michigan Tech † indicates conference regular season champion * indicates conference tournament champion

=== Final regular season polls ===
The final top 10 teams as ranked by coaches (WMPL) before the conference tournament finals.

WMPL Coaches Poll
Ranking	Team
1	Michigan Tech
2	Boston University
3	Michigan State
4	New Hampshire
5	Minnesota
6	Brown
7	Michigan
8	Bowling Green State
9	Notre Dame
10	Clarkson
10 (tie)	Cornell

== 1976 NCAA Tournament ==
Semifinals; March 25–26
E1	Boston University	2
W2	Minnesota	4
W1	Michigan Tech	7*
E2	Brown	6

National championship March 27
W2	Minnesota	6
W1	Michigan Tech	4
Third-place game
E1	Boston University	7
E2	Brown	8

Note: * denotes overtime period(s)

== Player stats ==
=== Scoring leaders ===
The following players led the league in points at the conclusion of the season.

GP = Games played; G = Goals; A = Assists; Pts = Points; PIM = Penalty minutes

Player	Class	Team	GP	G	A	Pts	PIM
Tom Ross	Senior	Michigan State	41	51	54	105	28
Mike Zuke	Senior	Michigan Tech	43	47	57	104	42
Steve Colp	Senior	Michigan State	39	40	54	94	56
Bruce Allworth	Junior	Ohio State	34	40	53	93	50
George Lyle	Junior	Michigan Tech	43	47	41	88	42
Stuart Ostlund	Sophomore	Michigan Tech	43	34	50	84	18
Darryl Rice	Senior	Michigan State	41	31	51	82	54
Chuck Delich	Junior	Air Force	26	44	35	79	45
Bill Gilligan	Sophomore	Brown	30	25	54	79	10
Jim Mayer	Senior	Michigan Tech	43	29	42	71	58

=== Leading goaltenders ===
The following goaltenders led the league in goals against average at the end of the regular season while playing at least 33% of their team's total minutes.

GP = Games played; Min = Minutes played; W = Wins; L = Losses; OT = Overtime/shootout losses; GA = Goals against; SO = Shutouts; SV% = Save percentage; GAA = Goals against average

Player	Class	Team	GP	Min	W	L	OT	GA	SO	SV%	GAA
Mike Liut	Junior	Bowling Green	21	1171	13	5	0	50	0	.905	2.56
Tom Mohr	Senior	Minnesota	12	689	8	3	1	31	0	.905	2.70
Lindsay Middlebrook	Junior	Saint Louis	30	1767	-	-	-	88	0	-	2.99
Dan Magnarelli	Junior	New Hampshire	21	1230	-	-	-	65	0	.886	3.17
Jeff Tscherne	Sophomore	Minnesota	29	1766	19	9	1	103	0	.893	3.50
Mark Evans	Sophomore	New Hampshire	11	562	-	-	-	37	0	.850	3.95
Kevin McCabe	Junior	Brown	29	1619	21	7	0	107	0	.879	3.97
Bruce Horsch	Sophomore	Michigan Tech	31	1860	24	7	0	124	1	.898	4.00
Ernie Glanville	Sophomore	Denver	19	-	9	-	-	-	0	.882	4.10
Pat Tims	Junior	Lake Superior State	22	-	-	-	-	-	-	-	4.13

== Awards ==
=== NCAA ===
Award		Recipient
Spencer Penrose Award		John MacInnes, Michigan Tech
Most Outstanding Player in NCAA Tournament		Tom Vannelli, Minnesota
AHCA All-American Teams
East Team	Position	West Team
Brian Shields, Clarkson	G	Eddie Mio, Colorado College
Peter Brown, Boston University	D	Jack Brownschidle, Notre Dame
Ron Wilson, Providence	D	Craig Norwich, Wisconsin
Cliff Cox, New Hampshire	F	Tom Ross, Michigan State
Jamie Hislop, New Hampshire	F	Mike Eaves, Wisconsin
Rick Meagher, Boston University	F	Mike Zuke, Michigan Tech
Bill Gilligan, Brown	F	

=== CCHA ===
Award		Recipient
Coach of the Year		Ron Mason, Bowling Green
All-CCHA Teams
First Team	Position	Second Team
Al Sarachman, Bowling Green	G	Mike Liut, Bowling Green
John Mavity, Bowling Green	D	Kent Jackson, Saint Louis
Ken Morrow, Bowling Green	D	George Kryzer, Saint Louis
Bruce Allworth, Ohio State	F	Mike Hartman, Bowling Green
Gary Murphy, Saint Louis	F	Mike Gaba, Lake Superior State
Mike Ballanger, Saint Louis	F	Kim Gellert, Lake Superior State

=== ECAC ===
Award		Recipient
Player of the Year		Peter Brown, Boston University
Rookie of the Year		Paul Skidmore, Boston College
Most Outstanding Player in Tournament		Terry Meagher, Boston University
All-ECAC Hockey Teams
First Team	Position	Second Team
Brian Shields, Clarkson	G	Paul Skidmore, Boston College
	G	Kevin McCabe, Brown
Ron Wilson, Providence	D	Bill Blackwood, Clarkson
Peter Brown, Boston University	D	Tim Burke, New Hampshire
Jamie Hislop, New Hampshire	F	Cliff Cox, New Hampshire
Rick Meagher, Boston University	F	Richie Smith, Boston College
Mike Eruzione, Boston University	F	Bill Gilligan, Brown

=== WCHA ===
Award		Recipient
Most Valuable Player		Mike Zuke, Michigan Tech
Freshman of the Year		Dave Delich, Colorado College
Coach of the Year		John MacInnes, Michigan Tech
All-WCHA Teams
First Team	Position	Second Team
Eddie Mio, Colorado College	G	Robbie Moore, Michigan
Jack Brownschidle, Notre Dame	D	Dave Langevin, Minnesota-Duluth
Reed Larson, Minnesota	D	Craig Norwich, Wisconsin
Tom Ross, Michigan State	F	Dave Debol, Michigan
George Lyle, Michigan Tech	F	Thomas Milani, Minnesota-Duluth
Mike Zuke, Michigan Tech	F	Steve Colp, Michigan State

== 1976 NHL Amateur Draft ==
Round	Pick	Player	College	Conference	NHL team
1	8	David Shand ^{‡}	Michigan	WCHA	Atlanta Flames
2	21	Steve Clippingdale ^{‡}	Wisconsin	WCHA	Los Angeles Kings
2	22	Reed Larson	Minnesota	WCHA	Detroit Red Wings
3	39	Don Jackson	Notre Dame	WCHA	Minnesota North Stars
3	41	Mike Fidler	Boston University	ECAC Hockey	California Golden Seals
3	54	Bill Baker	Minnesota	WCHA	Montreal Canadiens
4	56	Mike Liut	Bowling Green	CCHA	St. Louis Blues
4	59	Warren Young	Michigan Tech	WCHA	California Golden Seals
4	61	Paul Skidmore	Boston College	ECAC Hockey	St. Louis Blues
4	63	Dave Debol	Michigan	WCHA	Chicago Black Hawks
4	68	Ken Morrow	Bowling Green	CCHA	New York Islanders
4	70	Bob Miller	New Hampshire	ECAC Hockey	Boston Bruins
5	75	Phil Verchota	Minnesota	WCHA	Minnesota North Stars
5	79	Cal Sandbeck	Denver	WCHA	California Golden Seals
5	85	Rob Palmer	Michigan	WCHA	Los Angeles Kings
5	89	Robin Lang	Cornell	ECAC Hockey	Philadelphia Flyers
6	93	Dave Delich	Colorado College	WCHA	Minnesota North Stars
6	97	Nels Goddard	Michigan Tech	WCHA	St. Louis Blues
6	99	John Peterson	Notre Dame	WCHA	Chicago Black Hawks
6	107	Paul Klasinski ^{†}	Michigan State	WCHA	Philadelphia Flyers
7	110	Jeff Barr	Michigan State	WCHA	Minnesota North Stars
7	113	Mike Eaves	Wisconsin	WCHA	St. Louis Blues
7	115	John Rothstein	Minnesota–Duluth	WCHA	Chicago Black Hawks
8	122	Stuart Ostlund	Michigan Tech	WCHA	Vancouver Canucks
8	123	John Gregory	Wisconsin	WCHA	Chicago Black Hawks
9	124	Dave Dornseif	Providence	ECAC Hockey	St. Louis Blues
9	125	Bruce Horsch	Michigan Tech	WCHA	Montreal Canadiens
10	126	Bradley Wilson	Providence	ECAC Hockey	St. Louis Blues
11	128	Dan Hoene	Michigan	WCHA	St. Louis Blues
13	132	Jim Bales	Denver	WCHA	St. Louis Blues

† Incoming freshman.
‡ Clippingdale and Shand had both left school two years prior.

== See also ==
- 1975–76 NCAA Division II men's ice hockey season
- 1975–76 NCAA Division III men's ice hockey season
