= Reed Larson =

American ice hockey player (born 1956)

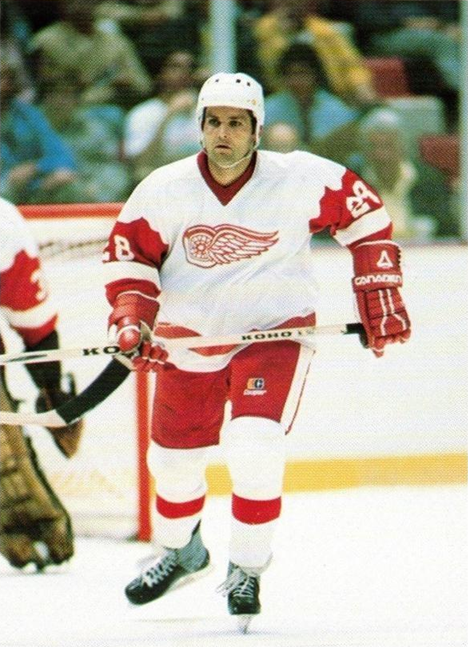
- Born: July 30, 1956 (age 70) Minneapolis, Minnesota, U.S.
- Height: 6 ft 0 in (183 cm)
- Weight: 195 lb (88 kg; 13 st 13 lb)
- Position: Defense
- Shot: Right
- Played for: Detroit Red Wings; Boston Bruins; Edmonton Oilers; New York Islanders; Minnesota North Stars; Buffalo Sabres; HC Alleghe; HC Milano
- National team: United States
- NHL draft: 22nd overall, 1976; Detroit Red Wings
- WHA draft: 220th overall, 1974; Minnesota Fighting Saints
- Playing career: 1976–1990

Reed David Larson (born July 30, 1956) is an American former professional ice hockey defenseman and former captain of the Detroit Red Wings who played 904 regular season games in the National Hockey League (NHL) between 1976 and 1990. He featured in the 1988 Stanley Cup Finals with the Bruins.

He is an honoured member of the United States Hockey Hall of Fame and was a recipient of the Lester Patrick Trophy for his contributions to hockey in the United States.

== Youth ==
Larson grew up in a working-class neighborhood in south Minneapolis, playing hockey at outdoor rinks and practicing his shooting in his garage. In the off-season, he water skied and did gymnastics, developing his arm strength and powerful slap shot. He played for Minneapolis Roosevelt High School and was their leading scorer in the 1973-1974 season when they went to the state tournament.

== College career ==
Larson spent three seasons under coach Herb Brooks with the Minnesota Gophers before being drafted by the Detroit Red Wings with the 22nd pick of the 1976 NHL entry draft. He was named one of the 50 greatest players in University of Minnesota hockey history as part of the "Legends on Ice" tribute in 2001.

== Professional and international career ==
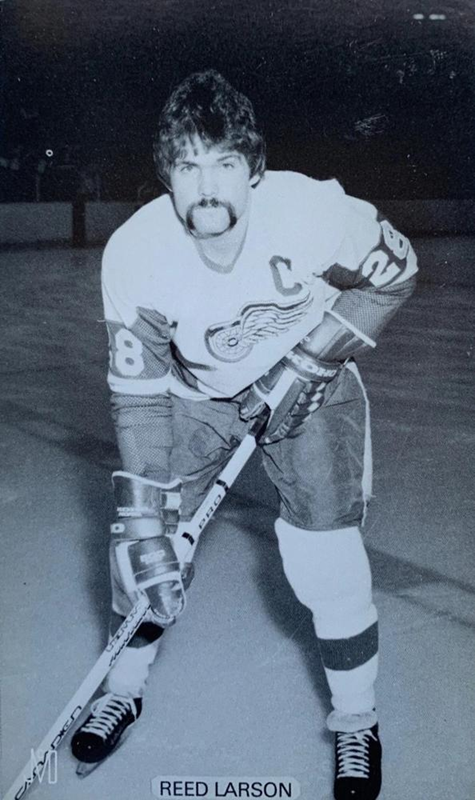
1980s postcard of Larson as team captain of the Detroit Red Wings

Larson joined Detroit near the end of the 1976–77 season after Minnesota suspended him for assaulting an official during a WCHA game. He appeared in 14 NHL games that season and was also named to Team USA for the 1977 World Ice Hockey Championships but missed the tournament due to a shoulder injury. His first full NHL season (1977–78) was highly successful scoring the most points (60) by a rookie defenseman. A tough, offensive defenseman, he was particularly well known for his hard slap shot. Larson became the first American defenseman to score 200 goals and he appeared in the 1978, 1980 and 1981 NHL All-Star Game as the Red Wings representative. He finally made his international debut for the United States national team at the 1981 World Ice Hockey Championships tournament and also represented the U.S. at the 1981 Canada Cup.

Larson spent ten NHL seasons in Detroit until the Red Wings traded him to the Boston Bruins for Mike O'Connell in 1986. He played another two seasons for the Bruins before ending his NHL career in 1989–90 with the Buffalo Sabres His professional career continued overseas in Italy where he was a player-coach for four seasons before returning to his home state for a final nine games for the International Hockey League Minnesota Moose in 1994–95. He also played six games in Roller Hockey International for the Minnesota Arctic Blast in 1994.

== Post-playing career ==
Larson has mostly been working in the insurance business since his retirement. He has also been active in oldtimers' charity hockey and has played in Heroes of Hockey games at several NHL All-Star weekends. He was elected to the United States Hockey Hall of Fame in 1996.

== Awards and honors ==
Award	Year
All-NCAA All-Tournament Team	1975
All-WCHA First Team	1975–76

- Member of U.S. Hockey Hall of Fame
- Played in NHL All-Star Game (1978, 1980, 1981)

== Career statistics ==
=== Regular season and playoffs ===
			Regular season					Playoffs
Season	Team	League	GP	G	A	Pts	PIM	GP	G	A	Pts	PIM
1973–74	Roosevelt High School	HS-MN	—	—	—	—	—	—	—	—	—	—
1974–75	University of Minnesota	WCHA	41	11	17	28	37	—	—	—	—	—
1975–76	University of Minnesota	WCHA	42	13	29	42	94	—	—	—	—	—
1976–77	University of Minnesota	WCHA	21	10	15	25	30	—	—	—	—	—
1976–77	Detroit Red Wings	NHL	14	0	1	1	23	—	—	—	—	—
1977–78	Detroit Red Wings	NHL	75	19	41	60	95	7	0	2	2	4
1978–79	Detroit Red Wings	NHL	79	18	49	67	169	—	—	—	—	—
1979–80	Detroit Red Wings	NHL	80	22	44	66	101	—	—	—	—	—
1980–81	Detroit Red Wings	NHL	78	27	31	58	153	—	—	—	—	—
1981–82	Detroit Red Wings	NHL	80	21	39	60	112	—	—	—	—	—
1982–83	Detroit Red Wings	NHL	80	22	52	74	104	—	—	—	—	—
1983–84	Detroit Red Wings	NHL	78	23	39	62	122	4	2	0	2	21
1984–85	Detroit Red Wings	NHL	77	17	45	62	139	3	1	2	3	20
1985–86	Detroit Red Wings	NHL	67	19	41	60	109	—	—	—	—	—
1985–86	Boston Bruins	NHL	13	3	4	7	8	3	1	0	1	6
1986–87	Boston Bruins	NHL	66	12	24	36	95	4	0	2	2	2
1987–88	Maine Mariners	AHL	2	2	0	2	4	—	—	—	—	—
1987–88	Boston Bruins	NHL	62	10	24	34	93	8	0	1	1	6
1988–89	Edmonton Oilers	NHL	10	2	7	9	15	—	—	—	—	—
1988–89	New York Islanders	NHL	33	7	13	20	35	—	—	—	—	—
1988–89	Minnesota North Stars	NHL	11	0	9	9	18	3	0	0	0	4
1989–90	Buffalo Sabres	NHL	1	0	0	0	0	—	—	—	—	—
1989–90	HC Alleghe	ITA	34	17	32	49	49	9	7	18	25	2
1990–91	HC Alleghe	ITA	36	13	38	51	24	7	3	7	10	6
1991–92	HC Milano Saima	ALP	5	2	2	4	6	—	—	—	—	—
1991–92	HC Milano Saima	ITA	17	5	11	16	6	12	4	10	14	8
1992–93	HC Courmaosta	ITA-2	32	30	48	78	83	—	—	—	—	—
1993–94	HC Courmaosta	ITA	19	6	20	26	18	12	5	7	12	7
1994–95	Minnesota Moose	IHL	9	2	2	4	11	—	—	—	—	—
NHL totals			904	222	463	685	1,391	32	4	7	11	63

=== International ===
Year	Team	Event	GP	G	A	Pts	PIM
1981	United States	WC	8	5	1	6	6
1981	United States	CC	5	1	1	2	4
Senior totals			13	6	2	8	10

Preceded by Dale McCourt	Detroit Red Wings captains 1980–82 with Errol Thompson, 1980–81	Succeeded by Danny Gare
