= Mike Fidler =

American ice hockey player (born 1956)

- Born: August 19, 1956 (age 68); Everett, Massachusetts, U.S.
- Height: 5 ft 11 in (180 cm)
- Weight: 194 lb (88 kg; 13 st 12 lb)
- Position: Left wing
- Shot: Left
- Played for: Cleveland Barons; Minnesota North Stars; Hartford Whalers; Chicago Black Hawks
- National team: United States
- NHL draft: 41st overall, 1976; California Golden Seals
- WHA draft: 13th overall, 1976; New England Whalers
- Playing career: 1976–1984

Michael Edward Fidler (born August 19, 1956) is an American former professional ice hockey player who played 271 games in the National Hockey League between 1976 and 1982. He played for the Cleveland Barons, Minnesota North Stars, Hartford Whalers, and Chicago Black Hawks. As an amateur, Fidler played for the Boston University hockey team and Malden Catholic.

In international hockey, Mike Fidler represented the United States national team at the 1978 IIHF Ice Hockey World Championships tournament (where he was the team's top scorer). He was also a member of the U.S. team that participated in the 1983 Pool B tournament.

== Career statistics ==
=== Regular season and playoffs ===
			Regular season					Playoffs
Season	Team	League	GP	G	A	Pts	PIM	GP	G	A	Pts	PIM
1973–74	Malden Catholic High School	HS-MA	20	45	34	79	79	—	—	—	—	—
1974–75	Boston University	ECAC	31	24	24	48	56	—	—	—	—	—
1975–76	Boston University	ECAC	29	22	24	46	78	—	—	—	—	—
1976–77	Cleveland Barons	NHL	46	17	16	33	17	—	—	—	—	—
1976–77	Salt Lake Golden Eagles	CHL	10	12	6	18	0	—	—	—	—	—
1977–78	Cleveland Barons	NHL	78	23	28	51	38	—	—	—	—	—
1978–79	Minnesota North Stars	NHL	59	23	26	49	42	—	—	—	—	—
1978–79	Oklahoma City Stars	CHL	8	6	4	10	7	—	—	—	—	—
1979–80	Minnesota North Stars	NHL	24	5	4	9	13	—	—	—	—	—
1980–81	Minnesota North Stars	NHL	20	5	12	17	6	—	—	—	—	—
1980–81	Hartford Whalers	NHL	38	9	9	18	4	—	—	—	—	—
1981–82	Hartford Whalers	NHL	2	0	1	1	0	—	—	—	—	—
1981–82	Oklahoma City Stars	CHL	6	3	5	8	0	—	—	—	—	—
1981–82	Erie Blades	AHL	5	1	2	3	0	—	—	—	—	—
1982–83	Chicago Black Hawks	NHL	4	2	1	3	4	—	—	—	—	—
1982–83	Springfield Indians	AHL	30	10	17	27	38	—	—	—	—	—
1982–83	Wiener EV	AUT	10	11	13	24	18	—	—	—	—	—
1983–84	New Haven Nighthawks	AHL	16	6	7	13	6	—	—	—	—	—
NHL totals			271	84	97	181	124	—	—	—	—	—

=== International ===
Year	Team	Event	GP	G	A	Pts	PIM
1978	United States	WC	10	8	2	10	18
1983	United States	WC-B	7	6	7	13	4
Senior totals			17	14	9	23	22
