= Warren Young =

Canadian ice hockey player

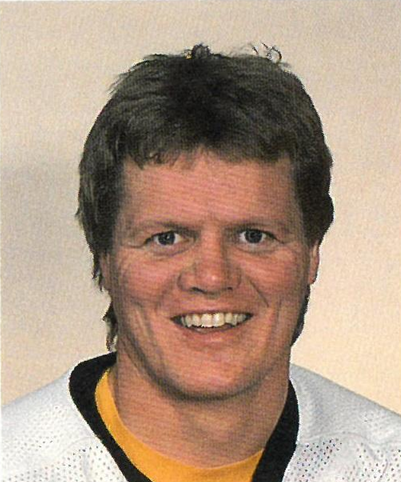
- Young in 1986 card
- Born: January 11, 1956 (age 70) Toronto, Ontario, Canada
- Height: 6 ft 3 in (191 cm)
- Weight: 195 lb (88 kg; 13 st 13 lb)
- Position: Centre
- Shot: Left
- Played for: Minnesota North Stars; Pittsburgh Penguins; Detroit Red Wings
- NHL draft: 59th overall, 1976; California Golden Seals
- WHA draft: 74th overall, 1976; New England Whalers
- Playing career: 1979–1988

Warren Howard Young (born January 11, 1956) is a Canadian former professional ice hockey left winger who played seven seasons in the National Hockey League (NHL) for the Minnesota North Stars, Pittsburgh Penguins and Detroit Red Wings.

== Playing career ==
Young was born in Toronto, Ontario. As a youth, he played in the 1968 Quebec International Pee-Wee Hockey Tournament with the Toronto Humberview minor ice hockey team.

He was selected in the 4th Round, 59th overall by the California Seals in the 1976 NHL Amateur Draft and the 7th round, 74th overall by the New England Whalers in the 1976 WHA Amateur Draft. He chose instead to play college hockey for Michigan Tech. Upon graduating, he spent three years playing in the minor leagues before being signed as a free agent by the North Stars in 1981, and made his NHL debut that year. He appeared in five games with the North Stars before he was signed as a free agent by the Penguins in 1983. In his first full season of 1984–85, playing on a line centered by superstar Mario Lemieux, he scored 40 goals and was named to the NHL All-Rookie Team that season. His emergence with the Penguins led many teams to increase their scouting of players at the college level. He left the Penguins following that season to sign with the Red Wings but was dealt back to Pittsburgh after one season. He retired in 1988 after playing 236 games in the NHL, scoring 72 goals.

In 1993-94, Young played four games with the Pittsburgh Phantoms of Roller Hockey International.

== Awards and achievements ==
- 1984–85 NHL All-Rookie Team

== Career statistics ==
			Regular season					Playoffs
Season	Team	League	GP	G	A	Pts	PIM	GP	G	A	Pts	PIM
1974–75	Dixie Beehives	OPJHL	44	32	25	57	50	—	—	—	—	—
1975–76	Michigan Tech University	WCHA	42	16	15	31	48	—	—	—	—	—
1976–77	Michigan Tech University	WCHA	37	19	26	45	86	—	—	—	—	—
1977–78	Michigan Tech University	WCHA	32	14	16	30	54	—	—	—	—	—
1978–79	Michigan Tech University	WCHA	30	14	10	24	49	—	—	—	—	—
1978–79	Oklahoma City Stars	CHL	4	0	1	1	2	—	—	—	—	—
1979–80	Oklahoma City Stars	CHL	13	4	8	12	9	—	—	—	—	—
1979–80	Baltimore Clippers	EHL	65	53	53	106	75	10	5	8	13	23
1980–81	Oklahoma City Stars	CHL	77	26	33	59	42	3	1	1	2	7
1981–82	Minnesota North Stars	NHL	1	0	0	0	0	—	—	—	—	—
1981–82	Nashville South Stars	CHL	60	31	28	59	154	—	—	—	—	—
1982–83	Minnesota North Stars	NHL	4	1	1	2	0	—	—	—	—	—
1982–83	Birmingham South Stars	CHL	75	26	58	84	144	13	3	3	6	57
1983–84	Baltimore Skipjacks	AHL	59	25	38	63	142	10	2	6	8	18
1983–84	Pittsburgh Penguins	NHL	15	1	7	8	19	—	—	—	—	—
1984–85	Pittsburgh Penguins	NHL	80	40	32	72	174	—	—	—	—	—
1985–86	Detroit Red Wings	NHL	79	22	24	46	161	—	—	—	—	—
1986–87	Baltimore Skipjacks	AHL	22	8	7	15	95	—	—	—	—	—
1986–87	Pittsburgh Penguins	NHL	50	8	13	21	103	—	—	—	—	—
1987–88	Pittsburgh Penguins	NHL	7	0	0	0	15	—	—	—	—	—
1987–88	Muskegon Lumberjacks	IHL	60	25	26	51	325	4	0	0	0	42
CHL totals			229	87	128	215	351	16	4	4	8	64
NHL totals			236	72	77	149	472	—	—	—	—	—
