= Tom Vannelli =

American ice hockey player and coach

- Born: 1955 (age 70–71) Saint Paul, Minnesota, USA
- Height: 5 ft 8 in (173 cm)
- Weight: 170 lb (77 kg; 12 st 2 lb)
- Position: Center
- Played for: Minnesota Golden Gophers; HC Lugano
- NHL draft: Undrafted
- Playing career: 1973–1978

Tom Vannelli is a retired American ice hockey player and coach. He helped Minnesota win its first two National Titles in 1974 and 1976 winning the Tournament MOP for the second.

== Career ==
Vannelli was a high-scoring forward for St. Paul Academy in his home town, recording 105 points in just 20 games during his senior year. He was part of Herb Brooks' second recruiting class and though limited to just three points in 17 games in his freshman season, Vannelli helped Minnesota win its first national championship. Vannelli missed only 1 game in his sophomore season and saw his point total ascend to 52, finishing second on the team. Minnesota won the WCHA championship and recorded its first 30-win season but the Gophers were shut down in the championship by Jim Warden of Michigan Tech.

Vannelli was named as an alternate captain in his junior season and posted career highs in goals (26) assists (43) and points (69) en route to leading the team in scoring. Vannelli led Minnesota to their third consecutive championship appearance and, unsatisfied with the result in 1975, took matters into his own hands with a 5-point night, 1 away from the tournament record. Vannelli had a hand in 5 of the Gophers' six goals on the night, and was named as the Tournament MOP for his offensive outburst. He remained with Minnesota for his senior season and again led the team in scoring, though the Gophers finished with a losing record.

After graduating Vannelli did not attract much attention from professional team despite his scoring totals. He played 10 games for the U.S. national team at the 1977 Ice Hockey World Championships. His playing career ended the following season after a brief appearance with HC Lugano. Vannelli returned to Minnesota and eventually turned to coaching. He became the head coach for Cretin-Derham Hall HS in 2000 and three years later teamed up with his brother Greg to be the co-coach at nearby Saint Thomas Academy. The Vannelli brothers built a powerhouse in short order, winning 10 section championships, four conference championships and 5 class A State Championships. They moved the program up into class AA late in their tenure and continued to produce stellar results, making three state championships in five years. Tom announced that he was retiring after the 2019 season and while Greg would continue on to lead the transition, Tom did not rule out a future return to coaching.

Awards and achievements
Preceded by Jim Warden	NCAA Tournament Most Outstanding Player; 1976	Succeeded by Julian Baretta
