= Ice hockey at the 1980 Winter Olympics – Rosters =

The ice hockey team rosters at the 1980 Winter Olympics consisted of the following players:

== Canada ==
Head coach: Clare Drake

Assistant coaches: Lorne Davis, George Kingston, Pierre Pagé, Tom Watt

No.	Pos.	Name	Height	Weight	Birthdate	Team
1	G	Bob Dupuis	5 ft 11 in (180 cm)	168 lb (76 kg)	August 26, 1952 (aged 27)	(Canada) Barrie Flyers
2	D	Warren Anderson (A)	5 ft 10 in (178 cm)	183 lb (83 kg)	April 13, 1952 (aged 27)	(Canada) Toronto Varsity Blues
3	D	Brad Pirie	5 ft 10 in (178 cm)	176 lb (80 kg)	October 21, 1955 (aged 24)	(Canada) Cambridge Hornets
4	D	Randy Gregg (C)	6 ft 0 in (183 cm)	209 lb (95 kg)	February 19, 1956 (aged 23)	(Canada) Alberta Golden Bears
5	D	Tim Watters	5 ft 11 in (180 cm)	185 lb (84 kg)	July 25, 1959 (aged 20)	(United States) Michigan Tech Huskies
6	F	Ron Davidson	5 ft 11 in (180 cm)	150 lb (68 kg)	July 16, 1957 (aged 22)	(Canada) Queen's Golden Gaels
7	D	Joe Grant	5 ft 11 in (180 cm)	181 lb (82 kg)	January 23, 1957 (aged 23)	(Canada) Toronto Varsity Blues
8	D	Don Spring	5 ft 11 in (180 cm)	194 lb (88 kg)	June 15, 1959 (aged 20)	(Canada) Alberta Golden Bears
9	F	Glenn Anderson	6 ft 1 in (185 cm)	190 lb (86 kg)	October 2, 1960 (aged 19)	(United States) Denver Pioneers
11	F	Kevin Maxwell	5 ft 9 in (175 cm)	165 lb (75 kg)	May 30, 1960 (aged 19)	(United States) North Dakota Fighting Sioux
12	F	Jim Nill	6 ft 0 in (183 cm)	185 lb (84 kg)	April 11, 1958 (aged 21)	(Canada) Medicine Hat Tigers
15	F	John Devaney	5 ft 9 in (175 cm)	170 lb (77 kg)	April 10, 1958 (aged 21)	(Canada) Alberta Golden Bears
17	F	Paul MacLean	6 ft 2 in (188 cm)	218 lb (99 kg)	March 9, 1958 (aged 21)	(Canada) Hull Olympiques
18	F	Dan D'Alvise	6 ft 1 in (185 cm)	194 lb (88 kg)	May 9, 1958 (aged 21)	(Canada) Toronto Varsity Blues
19	F	Ken Berry	5 ft 9 in (175 cm)	165 lb (75 kg)	June 21, 1960 (aged 19)	(United States) Denver Pioneers
20	F	Dave Hindmarch	6 ft 0 in (183 cm)	181 lb (82 kg)	October 15, 1958 (aged 21)	(Canada) Alberta Golden Bears
21	F	Kevin Primeau (A)	6 ft 0 in (183 cm)	181 lb (82 kg)	January 3, 1955 (aged 25)	(Switzerland) EHC Visp
22	F	Stelio Zupancich	5 ft 9 in (175 cm)	183 lb (83 kg)	April 7, 1958 (aged 21)	(Canada) Oshawa Generals
24	D	Terry O'Malley	6 ft 0 in (183 cm)	181 lb (82 kg)	October 21, 1940 (aged 39)	(Canada) Toronto's St. Michael's
29	G	Paul Pageau	5 ft 9 in (175 cm)	161 lb (73 kg)	October 2, 1959 (aged 20)	(Canada) Shawinigan Cataractes

== Czechoslovakia ==
Head coach: Karel Gut

Assistant coach: Luděk Bukač

No.	Pos.	Name	Height	Weight	Birthdate	Team
1	G	Jiří Králík	5 ft 9 in (175 cm)	165 lb (75 kg)	April 11, 1952 (aged 27)	(Czechoslovakia) ASD Dukla Jihlava
2	D	Jan Neliba	6 ft 0 in (183 cm)	185 lb (84 kg)	September 5, 1953 (aged 26)	(Czechoslovakia) TJ Kladno
4	D	Vítězslav Ďuriš	6 ft 1 in (185 cm)	194 lb (88 kg)	January 5, 1954 (aged 26)	(Czechoslovakia) TJ Plzeň
5	D	Milan Chalupa	5 ft 10 in (178 cm)	185 lb (84 kg)	July 4, 1953 (aged 26)	(Czechoslovakia) ASD Dukla Jihlava
6	F	Jiří Novák	5 ft 7 in (170 cm)	163 lb (74 kg)	June 6, 1950 (aged 29)	(Czechoslovakia) TJ Pardubice
6	F	Milan Nový	5 ft 10 in (178 cm)	196 lb (89 kg)	September 23, 1951 (aged 28)	(Czechoslovakia) TJ Kladno
8	D	Arnold Kadlec	6 ft 2 in (188 cm)	212 lb (96 kg)	January 8, 1959 (aged 21)	(Czechoslovakia) ASD Dukla Jihlava
9	D	Miroslav Dvořák	5 ft 10 in (178 cm)	198 lb (90 kg)	October 11, 1951 (aged 28)	(Czechoslovakia) TJ Motor Česke Budějovice
10	F	Vladimír Martinec	5 ft 8 in (173 cm)	185 lb (84 kg)	December 22, 1949 (aged 30)	(Czechoslovakia) TJ Pardubice
15	D	František Kaberle	5 ft 11 in (180 cm)	196 lb (89 kg)	August 6, 1951 (aged 28)	(Czechoslovakia) TJ Kladno
16	F	Miroslav Fryčer	6 ft 0 in (183 cm)	201 lb (91 kg)	September 27, 1959 (aged 20)	(Czechoslovakia) TJ Vitkovice
18	F	Marián Šťastný	5 ft 10 in (178 cm)	194 lb (88 kg)	January 8, 1953 (aged 27)	(Czechoslovakia) HC Dukla Jihlava
19	D	Jiří Bubla	5 ft 11 in (180 cm)	201 lb (91 kg)	January 27, 1950 (aged 30)	(Czechoslovakia) TJ CHZ Litvinov
20	F	Anton Šťastný	6 ft 0 in (183 cm)	185 lb (84 kg)	August 5, 1959 (aged 20)	(Czechoslovakia) HC Slovan Bratislava
21	F	Vincent Lukáč	5 ft 9 in (175 cm)	170 lb (77 kg)	February 14, 1954 (aged 25)	(Czechoslovakia) HC Košice
22	F	Karel Holý	6 ft 0 in (183 cm)	179 lb (81 kg)	February 3, 1956 (aged 24)	(Czechoslovakia) ASD Dukla Jihlava
23	F	Jaroslav Pouzar	6 ft 0 in (183 cm)	203 lb (92 kg)	January 23, 1952 (aged 28)	(Czechoslovakia) TJ Motor Česke Budějovice
24	G	Karel Lang	5 ft 9 in (175 cm)	172 lb (78 kg)	June 9, 1958 (aged 21)	(Czechoslovakia) HK Dukla Trenčín
25	F	Bohuslav Ebermann (C)	6 ft 0 in (183 cm)	183 lb (83 kg)	September 19, 1948 (aged 31)	(Czechoslovakia) TJ Plzeň
26	F	Peter Šťastný	6 ft 1 in (185 cm)	201 lb (91 kg)	September 18, 1956 (aged 23)	(Czechoslovakia) HC Slovan Bratislava

== Finland ==
Head coach: Kalevi Numminen

Assistant coach: Kari Mäkinen

No.	Pos.	Name	Height	Weight	Birthdate	Team
1	G	Antero Kivelä	5 ft 11 in (180 cm)	179 lb (81 kg)	December 26, 1955 (aged 24)	(Finland) Ässät
3	D	Seppo Suoraniemi	5 ft 9 in (175 cm)	168 lb (76 kg)	August 26, 1951 (aged 28)	(Finland) Ilves
4	D	Olli Saarinen	5 ft 8 in (173 cm)	152 lb (69 kg)	July 29, 1953 (aged 26)	(Finland) Kiekkoriepas
6	D	Hannu Haapalainen	-	-	February 28, 1951 (aged 28)	(Finland) Tappara
8	D	Tapio Levo (C)	6 ft 1 in (185 cm)	192 lb (87 kg)	September 24, 1955 (aged 24)	(Finland) Ässät
9	D	Kari Eloranta	6 ft 2 in (188 cm)	201 lb (91 kg)	February 29, 1956 (aged 23)	(Sweden) Leksands IF
10	D	Lasse Litma	6 ft 0 in (183 cm)	183 lb (83 kg)	April 5, 1954 (aged 25)	(Finland) Tappara
12	F	Esa Peltonen (A)	5 ft 10 in (178 cm)	176 lb (80 kg)	February 25, 1947 (aged 32)	(Finland) HIFK
13	F	Ismo Villa	5 ft 8 in (173 cm)	157 lb (71 kg)	November 8, 1954 (aged 25)	(Finland) Lukko
15	F	Mikko Leinonen	5 ft 11 in (180 cm)	176 lb (80 kg)	July 5, 1955 (aged 24)	(Finland) Kärpät
16	F	Markku Kiimalainen	6 ft 0 in (183 cm)	172 lb (78 kg)	October 8, 1955 (aged 24)	(Finland) Kärpät
17	F	Jari Kurri	6 ft 0 in (183 cm)	198 lb (90 kg)	May 18, 1960 (aged 19)	(Finland) Jokerit
19	G	Jorma Valtonen	5 ft 9 in (175 cm)	161 lb (73 kg)	December 22, 1946 (aged 33)	(Finland) TPS
20	F	Jukka Koskilahti	5 ft 9 in (175 cm)	168 lb (76 kg)	May 23, 1954 (aged 25)	(Sweden) HV71
21	F	Hannu Koskinen	-	-	November 23, 1955 (aged 24)	(Finland) Kiekkoriepas
22	F	Reijo Leppänen	-	-	November 8, 1951 (aged 28)	(Finland) TPS
23	F	Markku Hakulinen	6 ft 2 in (188 cm)	194 lb (88 kg)	February 27, 1956 (aged 23)	(Finland) Kiekkoriepas
25	F	Jukka Porvari (A)	5 ft 11 in (180 cm)	174 lb (79 kg)	January 19, 1954 (aged 26)	(Finland) Tappara
28	F	Jarmo Mäkitalo	5 ft 9 in (175 cm)	165 lb (75 kg)	October 8, 1960 (aged 19)	(Finland) Kiekkoriepas
29	F	Timo Susi	5 ft 10 in (178 cm)	176 lb (80 kg)	January 25, 1959 (aged 21)	(Finland) Tappara

== Japan ==
Head coach: Mel Wakabayashi

Assistant coach: Kenjiro Degai

No.	Pos.	Name	Height	Weight	Birthdate	Team
1	G	Minoru Misawa	5 ft 6 in (168 cm)	137 lb (62 kg)	May 1, 1949 (aged 30)	(Japan) Seibu Railway Team
3	D	Hiroshi Hori	5 ft 7 in (170 cm)	148 lb (67 kg)	September 19, 1949 (aged 30)	(Japan) Seibu Bears Tokyo
4	D	Iwao Nakayama	5 ft 6 in (168 cm)	148 lb (67 kg)	July 2, 1949 (aged 30)	(Japan) Seibu Bears Tokyo
6	D	Norio Ito	5 ft 7 in (170 cm)	159 lb (72 kg)	July 18, 1948 (aged 31)	(Japan) Kokudo
7	F	Yoshiaki Kyoya	5 ft 7 in (170 cm)	157 lb (71 kg)	April 5, 1951 (aged 28)	(Japan) Oji Seishi
8	F	Katsutoshi Kawamura	5 ft 8 in (173 cm)	159 lb (72 kg)	January 18, 1954 (aged 26)	(Japan) Seibu Bears Tokyo
9	D	Hitoshi Nakamura	5 ft 8 in (173 cm)	159 lb (72 kg)	April 29, 1949 (aged 30)	(Japan) Seibu Bears Tokyo
10	F	Takeshi Azuma	5 ft 6 in (168 cm)	152 lb (69 kg)	January 9, 1953 (aged 27)	(Japan) Oji Seishi
11	D	Tadamitsu Fujii	6 ft 0 in (183 cm)	172 lb (78 kg)	January 24, 1954 (aged 26)	(Japan) Kokudo
12	F	Satoru Misawa	5 ft 5 in (165 cm)	139 lb (63 kg)	June 25, 1943 (aged 36)	(Japan) Seibu Bears Tokyo
13	F	Mikio Matsuda	5 ft 6 in (168 cm)	148 lb (67 kg)	August 18, 1949 (aged 30)	(Japan) Kokudo
14	F	Sadaki Honma	5 ft 9 in (175 cm)	161 lb (73 kg)	June 4, 1953 (aged 26)	(Japan) Oji Seishi
15	F	Hideo Sakurai	5 ft 6 in (168 cm)	154 lb (70 kg)	August 14, 1948 (aged 31)	(Japan) Kokudo
16	F	Tsutomu Hanzawa (C)	5 ft 3 in (160 cm)	139 lb (63 kg)	August 28, 1948 (aged 31)	(Japan) Seibu Bears Tokyo
17	F	Hideo Urabe	5 ft 9 in (175 cm)	170 lb (77 kg)	April 7, 1954 (aged 25)	(Japan) Oji Seishi
18	F	Herb Wakabayashi	5 ft 5 in (165 cm)	154 lb (70 kg)	December 23, 1944 (aged 35)	(Japan) Seibu Bears Tokyo
20	F	Mikio Hosoi	-	-	September 19, 1949 (aged 30)	(Japan) Kokudo
22	D	Koji Wakasa	5 ft 11 in (180 cm)	179 lb (81 kg)	July 12, 1953 (aged 26)	(Japan) Oji Seishi
23	F	Yoshio Hoshino (A)	5 ft 11 in (180 cm)	176 lb (80 kg)	November 2, 1950 (aged 29)	(Japan) Kokudo
25	G	Takeshi Iwamoto	5 ft 7 in (170 cm)	159 lb (72 kg)	June 9, 1959 (aged 20)	(Japan) Kokudo

== Netherlands ==
Head coach: (Sweden) Hans Westberg

No.	Pos.	Name	Height	Weight	Birthdate	Team
1	G	Ted Lenssen	5 ft 10 in (178 cm)	174 lb (79 kg)	May 17, 1952 (aged 27)	(Netherlands) Feenstra Flyers Heerenveen
2	F	Harry van Heumen	5 ft 9 in (175 cm)	159 lb (72 kg)	December 24, 1959 (aged 20)	(Netherlands) Roswell Nijmegen
3	F	Larry van Wieren (C)	5 ft 11 in (180 cm)	181 lb (82 kg)	May 3, 1951 (aged 28)	(Netherlands) Feenstra Flyers Heerenveen
4	F	Ron Berteling	6 ft 2 in (188 cm)	187 lb (85 kg)	September 6, 1957 (aged 22)	(Netherlands) De Bisschop Amsterdam
5	F	Dick Decloe	6 ft 4 in (193 cm)	203 lb (92 kg)	May 23, 1953 (aged 26)	(Germany) Düsseldorfer EG
7	D	Patrick Kolijn	-	-	January 9, 1957 (aged 23)	(Netherlands) 's-Hertogenbosch Wolven
8	F	Jack de Heer	5 ft 11 in (180 cm)	172 lb (78 kg)	May 17, 1953 (aged 26)	(Netherlands) Feenstra Flyers Heerenveen
9	D	Georg Peternousek	6 ft 0 in (183 cm)	196 lb (89 kg)	March 11, 1947 (aged 32)	(Netherlands) Tilburg Trappers
10	F	Jan Janssen	6 ft 1 in (185 cm)	176 lb (80 kg)	May 17, 1952 (aged 27)	(Netherlands) Feenstra Flyers Heerenveen
11	F	Al Pluymers	5 ft 11 in (180 cm)	203 lb (92 kg)	June 8, 1957 (aged 22)	(Netherlands) GIJS Groningen
12	D	Rick van Gog	5 ft 11 in (180 cm)	185 lb (84 kg)	April 3, 1958 (aged 21)	(Netherlands) GIJS Groningen
14	D	Henk Hille	6 ft 0 in (183 cm)	181 lb (82 kg)	May 16, 1959 (aged 20)	(Netherlands) De Bisschop Amsterdam
15	F	Klaas van den Broek (A)	6 ft 4 in (193 cm)	190 lb (86 kg)	July 7, 1955 (aged 24)	(Netherlands) Tilburg Trappers
16	F	Leo Koopmans	6 ft 5 in (196 cm)	214 lb (97 kg)	November 20, 1953 (aged 26)	(Netherlands) Feenstra Flyers Heerenveen
17	F	Frank van Soldt	6 ft 1 in (185 cm)	181 lb (82 kg)	July 28, 1953 (aged 26)	(Netherlands) Feenstra Flyers Heerenveen
18	F	Brian de Bruyn	5 ft 11 in (180 cm)	187 lb (85 kg)	September 4, 1954 (aged 25)	(Netherlands) Feenstra Flyers Heerenveen
19	D	Chuck Huizinga	6 ft 0 in (183 cm)	214 lb (97 kg)	October 29, 1953 (aged 26)	(Netherlands) De Bisschop Amsterdam
20	C	Corky de Graauw	6 ft 0 in (183 cm)	183 lb (83 kg)	February 23, 1951 (aged 29)	(Netherlands) De Bisschop Amsterdam
25	F/D	William Klooster	6 ft 1 in (185 cm)	190 lb (86 kg)	December 25, 1957 (aged 22)	(Netherlands) De Bisschop Amsterdam
30	G	John de Bruyn	5 ft 10 in (178 cm)	165 lb (75 kg)	February 3, 1956 (aged 24)	(Netherlands) De Bisschop Amsterdam

== Norway ==
Head coach: (Sweden) Ronald Pettersson

Assistant coach: Olav Dalsøren

No.	Pos.	Name	Height	Weight	Birthdate	Team
1	G	Jim Marthinsen	6 ft 2 in (188 cm)	196 lb (89 kg)	April 15, 1956 (aged 23)	(Norway) Vålerenga
3	D	Nils Nilsen	6 ft 1 in (185 cm)	163 lb (74 kg)	December 29, 1952 (aged 27)	(Norway) Frisk Asker
4	D	Thor Martinsen	5 ft 7 in (170 cm)	176 lb (80 kg)	July 12, 1945 (aged 34)	(Norway) Frisk Asker
5	F	Håkon Lundenes	-	-	January 2, 1954 (aged 26)	(Norway) Djerv
6	D	Trond Abrahamsen	6 ft 0 in (183 cm)	192 lb (87 kg)	July 16, 1960 (aged 19)	(Norway) Manglerud
7	D	Rune Molberg (C)	6 ft 1 in (185 cm)	190 lb (86 kg)	November 21, 1952 (aged 27)	(Norway) Manglerud
8	F	Geir Myhre	6 ft 0 in (183 cm)	181 lb (82 kg)	April 7, 1954 (aged 25)	(Norway) Hasle/Løren
9	F	Morten Johansen	5 ft 11 in (180 cm)	159 lb (72 kg)	December 25, 1951 (aged 28)	(Norway) Frisk Asker
10	F	Morten Sethereng (A)	5 ft 8 in (173 cm)	157 lb (71 kg)	January 15, 1953 (aged 27)	(Norway) Frisk Asker
11	F	Knut Andresen	5 ft 8 in (173 cm)	184 lb (83 kg)	June 2, 1959 (aged 20)	(Norway) Frisk Asker
12	F	Tore Falch Nilsen	-	-	March 27, 1948 (aged 31)	(Norway) Hasle/Løren
13	F	Tom Røymark	6 ft 0 in (183 cm)	172 lb (78 kg)	April 23, 1950 (aged 29)	(Norway) Manglerud
14	D	Øivind Løsåmoen	6 ft 1 in (185 cm)	190 lb (86 kg)	October 13, 1957 (aged 22)	(Norway) Furuset
15	F	Vidar Johansen	6 ft 0 in (183 cm)	165 lb (75 kg)	December 17, 1951 (aged 28)	(Norway) Frisk Asker
16	D	Erik Pedersen (A)	6 ft 4 in (193 cm)	203 lb (92 kg)	September 20, 1955 (aged 24)	(Norway) Stjernen Hockey
17	F	Petter Thoresen	6 ft 0 in (183 cm)	187 lb (85 kg)	July 25, 1961 (aged 18)	(Norway) Forward SPK
18	F	Knut Fjeldsgaard	-	-	May 19, 1952 (aged 27)	(Norway) Djerv
20	G	Tore Wålberg	6 ft 0 in (183 cm)	181 lb (82 kg)	August 19, 1953 (aged 26)	(Norway) Frisk Asker
21	D	Øystein Jarlsbo	5 ft 11 in (180 cm)	183 lb (83 kg)	March 7, 1961 (aged 18)	(Norway) Forward SPK
22	F	Stephen Foyn	5 ft 11 in (180 cm)	185 lb (84 kg)	June 23, 1959 (aged 20)	(Sweden) Färjestad BK

== Poland ==
Head coach: Czeslaw Borowicz

Assistant coach: Emil Nikodemowicz

No.	Pos.	Name	Height	Weight	Birthdate	Team
1	G	Henryk Wojtynek	5 ft 10 in (178 cm)	165 lb (75 kg)	March 23, 1950 (aged 29)	(Poland) Naprzód Janów
2	G	Paweł Łukaszka	5 ft 10 in (178 cm)	183 lb (83 kg)	February 6, 1962 (aged 18)	(Poland) Podhale Nowy Targ
3	D	Andrzej Ujwary	5 ft 11 in (180 cm)	174 lb (79 kg)	August 21, 1960 (aged 19)	(Poland) Podhale Nowy Targ
5	D	Henryk Janiszewski	5 ft 11 in (180 cm)	181 lb (82 kg)	November 20, 1951 (aged 28)	(Poland) Naprzód Janów
6	D	Henryk Gruth	6 ft 0 in (183 cm)	198 lb (90 kg)	September 2, 1957 (aged 22)	(Poland) GKS Katowice
7	F	Stefan Chowaniec (C)	5 ft 5 in (165 cm)	148 lb (67 kg)	April 21, 1953 (aged 26)	(Poland) Podhale Nowy Targ
8	F	Wiesław Jobczyk	5 ft 8 in (173 cm)	170 lb (77 kg)	February 23, 1954 (aged 25)	(Poland) Zagłębie Sosnowiec
9	F	Tadeusz Obłój	5 ft 9 in (175 cm)	174 lb (79 kg)	August 29, 1950 (aged 29)	(Poland) Baildon Katowice
10	F	Dariusz Sikora	5 ft 9 in (175 cm)	161 lb (73 kg)	December 30, 1958 (aged 21)	(Poland) Podhale Nowy Targ
13	F	Leszek Kokoszka	5 ft 7 in (170 cm)	163 lb (74 kg)	April 11, 1951 (aged 28)	(Poland) ŁKS Łódź
14	F/D	Andrzej Jańczy	5 ft 7 in (170 cm)	161 lb (73 kg)	July 14, 1954 (aged 25)	(Poland) Podhale Nowy Targ
15	F	Andrzej Zabawa	5 ft 8 in (173 cm)	146 lb (66 kg)	November 29, 1955 (aged 24)	(Poland) Zagłębie Sosnowiec
16	F	Henryk Pytel	5 ft 9 in (175 cm)	159 lb (72 kg)	September 15, 1955 (aged 24)	(Poland) Zagłębie Sosnowiec
17	F	Stanisław Klocek	5 ft 8 in (173 cm)	150 lb (68 kg)	October 17, 1955 (aged 24)	(Poland) Zagłębie Sosnowiec
18	F	Leszek Jachna	5 ft 11 in (180 cm)	161 lb (73 kg)	May 9, 1958 (aged 21)	(Poland) Legia Warszawa
19	F	Bogdan Dziubinski	5 ft 9 in (175 cm)	176 lb (80 kg)	January 1, 1958 (aged 22)	(Poland) Podhale Nowy Targ
20	D	Jerzy Potz (A)	5 ft 11 in (180 cm)	187 lb (85 kg)	February 1, 1953 (aged 27)	(Poland) ŁKS Łódź
21	D	Ludwik Synowiec	5 ft 9 in (175 cm)	185 lb (84 kg)	January 19, 1958 (aged 22)	(Poland) Naprzód Janów
22	F	Andrzej Małysiak	5 ft 9 in (175 cm)	154 lb (70 kg)	June 30, 1957 (aged 22)	(Poland) GKS Katowice
25	D	Marek Marcińczak	5 ft 10 in (178 cm)	168 lb (76 kg)	January 19, 1954 (aged 26)	(Poland) Zagłębie Sosnowiec

== Romania ==
Head coach: Ștefan Ionescu

Assistant coach: Ion Tiron

No.	Pos.	Name	Height	Weight	Birthdate	Team
1	G	Valerian Netedu	5 ft 9 in (175 cm)	172 lb (78 kg)	January 26, 1953 (aged 27)	(Romania) Steaua București
2	D	Mihail Lucian Popescu	6 ft 0 in (183 cm)	203 lb (92 kg)	November 11, 1960 (aged 19)	(Romania) Steaua București
4	D	Ion Berdilă	5 ft 11 in (180 cm)	172 lb (78 kg)	February 1, 1958 (aged 22)	(Romania) Dunarea Galati
5	D	Șandor Gal	5 ft 9 in (175 cm)	187 lb (85 kg)	November 23, 1955 (aged 24)	(Romania) SC Miercurea Ciuc
6	F	Doru Tureanu (C)	5 ft 10 in (178 cm)	181 lb (82 kg)	January 11, 1954 (aged 26)	(Romania) Dinamo Bucuresti
7	F	Dumitru Axinte	5 ft 7 in (170 cm)	170 lb (77 kg)	May 9, 1952 (aged 23)	(Romania) Dinamo Bucuresti
8	D	Elöd Antal	5 ft 7 in (170 cm)	168 lb (76 kg)	March 11, 1955 (aged 24)	(Romania) SC Miercurea Ciuc
9	D	István Antal	6 ft 0 in (183 cm)	187 lb (85 kg)	September 18, 1958 (aged 21)	(Romania) SC Miercurea Ciuc
10	F	Marian Costea	5 ft 6 in (168 cm)	157 lb (71 kg)	June 13, 1952 (aged 27)	(Romania) Dinamo Bucuresti
12	F	Constantin Nistor	5 ft 9 in (175 cm)	170 lb (77 kg)	May 22, 1954 (aged 25)	(Romania) Steaua București
14	D	Doru Moroșan (A)	6 ft 1 in (185 cm)	185 lb (84 kg)	May 13, 1953 (aged 26)	(Romania) Dinamo Bucuresti
15	F	Alexandru Hălăucă	6 ft 0 in (183 cm)	183 lb (83 kg)	August 12, 1957 (aged 22)	(Romania) Steaua București
16	F	László Sólyom	5 ft 11 in (180 cm)	183 lb (83 kg)	May 28, 1944 (aged 35)	(Romania) Dinamo Bucuresti
17	F	Bela Nagy	5 ft 10 in (178 cm)	161 lb (73 kg)	February 26, 1953 (aged 26)	(Romania) Dinamo Bucuresti
18	F	Traian Cazacu	5 ft 10 in (178 cm)	168 lb (76 kg)	October 22, 1958 (aged 21)	(Romania) Steaua București
19	D	George Justinian	6 ft 0 in (183 cm)	190 lb (86 kg)	January 25, 1954 (aged 26)	(Romania) Steaua București
20	F	Adrian Olenici	5 ft 7 in (170 cm)	179 lb (81 kg)	April 19, 1956 (aged 23)	(Romania) Steaua București
21	F	Marian Pisaru	5 ft 7 in (170 cm)	150 lb (68 kg)	January 4, 1954 (aged 26)	(Romania) Dinamo Bucuresti
22	G	Gheorghe Huțan	5 ft 7 in (170 cm)	157 lb (71 kg)	April 8, 1954 (aged 25)	(Romania) Dinamo Bucuresti
24	F	Zoltan Nagy	5 ft 10 in (178 cm)	165 lb (75 kg)	August 19, 1955 (aged 24)	(Romania) Dinamo Bucuresti

== Soviet Union ==
Head coach: Viktor Tikhonov

Assistant coach: Vladimir Yurzinov

No.	Pos.	Name	Height	Weight	Birthdate	Team
1	G	Vladimir Myshkin	5 ft 11 in (180 cm)	154 lb (70 kg)	June 19, 1955 (aged 24)	(Soviet Union) Krylia Sovetov Moskva
2	D	Viacheslav Fetisov	6 ft 0 in (183 cm)	218 lb (99 kg)	April 20, 1958 (aged 21)	(Soviet Union) CSKA Moskva
5	D	Vasili Pervukhin	5 ft 11 in (180 cm)	203 lb (92 kg)	January 1, 1956 (aged 24)	(Soviet Union) Dynamo Moskva
6	D	Valeri Vasiliev (A)	6 ft 0 in (183 cm)	190 lb (86 kg)	August 3, 1949 (aged 30)	(Soviet Union) Dynamo Moskva
7	D	Alexei Kasatonov	6 ft 1 in (185 cm)	196 lb (89 kg)	October 14, 1959 (aged 20)	(Soviet Union) CSKA Moskva
9	F	Vladimir Krutov	5 ft 9 in (175 cm)	194 lb (88 kg)	June 1, 1960 (aged 19)	(Soviet Union) CSKA Moskva
10	F	Alexander Maltsev	5 ft 9 in (175 cm)	170 lb (77 kg)	April 20, 1949 (aged 30)	(Soviet Union) Dynamo Moskva
11	F	Yuri Lebedev	5 ft 10 in (178 cm)	174 lb (79 kg)	March 1, 1951 (aged 28)	(Soviet Union) Krylia Sovetov Moskva
12	D	Sergei Starikov	5 ft 10 in (178 cm)	225 lb (102 kg)	December 4, 1958 (aged 21)	(Soviet Union) CSKA Moskva
13	F	Boris Mikhailov (C)	5 ft 9 in (175 cm)	163 lb (74 kg)	June 10, 1944 (aged 35)	(Soviet Union) CSKA Moskva
14	D	Zinetula Bilyaletdinov	5 ft 11 in (180 cm)	190 lb (86 kg)	March 13, 1955 (aged 24)	(Soviet Union) Dynamo Moskva
16	F	Vladimir Petrov	6 ft 0 in (183 cm)	196 lb (89 kg)	June 30, 1947 (aged 32)	(Soviet Union) CSKA Moskva
17	F	Valeri Kharlamov	5 ft 8 in (173 cm)	161 lb (73 kg)	January 14, 1948 (aged 32)	(Soviet Union) CSKA Moskva
19	F	Helmuts Balderis	5 ft 11 in (180 cm)	190 lb (86 kg)	July 31, 1952 (aged 27)	(Soviet Union) CSKA Moskva
20	G	Vladislav Tretiak	6 ft 0 in (183 cm)	201 lb (91 kg)	April 25, 1952 (aged 27)	(Soviet Union) CSKA Moskva
22	F	Viktor Zhluktov	6 ft 2 in (188 cm)	209 lb (95 kg)	January 26, 1954 (aged 26)	(Soviet Union) CSKA Moskva
23	F	Vladimir Golikov	6 ft 1 in (185 cm)	185 lb (84 kg)	June 10, 1954 (aged 25)	(Soviet Union) Dynamo Moskva
24	F	Sergei Makarov	5 ft 11 in (180 cm)	183 lb (83 kg)	June 19, 1958 (aged 21)	(Soviet Union) CSKA Moskva
25	F	Alexander Golikov	5 ft 11 in (180 cm)	172 lb (78 kg)	November 26, 1952 (aged 27)	(Soviet Union) Dynamo Moskva
27	F	Alexander Skvortsov	5 ft 7 in (170 cm)	190 lb (86 kg)	August 28, 1954 (aged 25)	(Soviet Union) Torpedo Gorky

== Sweden ==
Head coach: Tommy Sandlin

Assistant coach: Bengt Ohlson

No.	Pos.	Name	Height	Weight	Birthdate	Team
1	G	Pelle Lindbergh	5 ft 9 in (175 cm)	170 lb (77 kg)	May 24, 1959 (aged 20)	(Sweden) AIK
2	D	Tomas Jonsson	5 ft 11 in (180 cm)	183 lb (83 kg)	April 12, 1960 (aged 19)	(Sweden) Modo AIK
3	D	Sture Andersson	5 ft 8 in (173 cm)	161 lb (73 kg)	November 18, 1949 (aged 30)	(Sweden) Modo AIK
4	D	Ulf Weinstock (A)	5 ft 10 in (178 cm)	181 lb (82 kg)	August 10, 1952 (aged 27)	(Sweden) Leksands IF
6	D	Jan Eriksson	5 ft 10 in (178 cm)	172 lb (78 kg)	January 14, 1958 (aged 22)	(Sweden) Modo AIK
7	D	Tommy Samuelsson	5 ft 10 in (178 cm)	165 lb (75 kg)	January 12, 1960 (aged 20)	(Sweden) Färjestad BK
8	F	Per Lundqvist	5 ft 10 in (178 cm)	157 lb (71 kg)	January 24, 1951 (aged 29)	(Sweden) Modo AIK
9	D	Mats Waltin (C)	5 ft 11 in (180 cm)	172 lb (78 kg)	October 7, 1953 (aged 26)	(Sweden) Djurgårdens IF
12	F	Mats Åhlberg	5 ft 10 in (178 cm)	174 lb (79 kg)	May 16, 1947 (aged 32)	(Sweden) Leksands IF
14	F	Håkan Eriksson	6 ft 0 in (183 cm)	190 lb (86 kg)	January 24, 1956 (aged 24)	(Sweden) Djurgårdens IF
15	F	Mats Näslund	5 ft 7 in (170 cm)	161 lb (73 kg)	October 31, 1959 (aged 20)	(Sweden) Brynäs IF
16	F	Lennart Norberg	6 ft 1 in (185 cm)	176 lb (80 kg)	January 21, 1949 (aged 31)	(Sweden) IF Björklöven
17	F	Bengt Lundholm	6 ft 0 in (183 cm)	181 lb (82 kg)	August 4, 1955 (aged 24)	(Sweden) AIK
18	F	Leif Holmgren	5 ft 9 in (175 cm)	172 lb (78 kg)	May 25, 1953 (aged 26)	(Sweden) AIK
19	F	Bo Berglund	5 ft 10 in (178 cm)	181 lb (82 kg)	April 6, 1955 (aged 24)	(Sweden) Djurgårdens IF
21	F	Dan Söderström	5 ft 8 in (173 cm)	163 lb (74 kg)	April 5, 1948 (aged 31)	(Sweden) Leksands IF
22	F	Harald Lückner	6 ft 1 in (185 cm)	198 lb (90 kg)	March 27, 1957 (aged 22)	(Sweden) Färjestad BK
23	F	Lars Molin	6 ft 0 in (183 cm)	176 lb (80 kg)	May 7, 1956 (aged 23)	(Sweden) Modo AIK
27	D	Thomas Eriksson	6 ft 2 in (188 cm)	196 lb (89 kg)	October 16, 1959 (aged 20)	(Sweden) Djurgårdens IF
28	G	William Löfqvist	5 ft 10 in (178 cm)	168 lb (76 kg)	April 12, 1947 (aged 32)	(Sweden) Brynäs IF

== United States ==
Head coach: Herb Brooks

Assistant coach: Craig Patrick

No.	Pos.	Name	Height	Weight	Birthdate	Team
1	G	Steve Janaszak	6 ft 1 in (185 cm)	209 lb (95 kg)	January 7, 1957 (aged 23)	(United States) Minnesota Golden Golphers
3	D	Ken Morrow	6 ft 5 in (196 cm)	205 lb (93 kg)	October 17, 1956 (aged 23)	(United States) Bowling Green Falcons
5	D	Mike Ramsey	6 ft 3 in (191 cm)	212 lb (96 kg)	December 3, 1960 (aged 19)	(United States) Minnesota Golden Golphers
6	D	Bill Baker (A)	6 ft 1 in (185 cm)	192 lb (87 kg)	November 29, 1956 (aged 23)	(United States) Minnesota Golden Golphers
8	F	Dave Silk	5 ft 11 in (180 cm)	190 lb (86 kg)	January 1, 1958 (aged 22)	(United States) Boston University Terriers
9	F	Neal Broten	5 ft 9 in (175 cm)	170 lb (77 kg)	November 29, 1959 (aged 20)	(United States) Minnesota Golden Golphers
10	F	Mark Johnson	5 ft 9 in (175 cm)	161 lb (73 kg)	September 22, 1957 (aged 22)	(United States) Wisconsin Badgers
11	F	Steve Christoff	6 ft 1 in (185 cm)	181 lb (82 kg)	January 23, 1958 (aged 22)	(United States) Minnesota Golden Golphers
15	F	Mark Wells	5 ft 9 in (175 cm)	174 lb (79 kg)	September 18, 1957 (aged 22)	(United States) Bowling Green Falcons
16	F	Mark Pavelich	5 ft 7 in (170 cm)	168 lb (76 kg)	February 28, 1958 (aged 21)	(United States) Minnesota Duluth Bulldogs
17	D	Jack O'Callahan	6 ft 1 in (185 cm)	187 lb (85 kg)	June 24, 1957 (aged 22)	(United States) Boston University Terriers
19	F	Eric Strobel	5 ft 10 in (178 cm)	174 lb (79 kg)	June 5, 1958 (aged 21)	(United States) Minnesota Golden Golphers
20	D	Bob Suter	5 ft 9 in (175 cm)	179 lb (81 kg)	May 16, 1957 (aged 22)	(United States) Wisconsin Badgers
21	F	Mike Eruzione (C)	5 ft 10 in (178 cm)	181 lb (82 kg)	October 25, 1954 (aged 25)	(United States) Boston University Terriers
23	F	Dave Christian	5 ft 11 in (180 cm)	176 lb (80 kg)	May 12, 1959 (aged 20)	(United States) North Dakota Fighting Sioux
24	F	Rob McClanahan	5 ft 10 in (178 cm)	181 lb (82 kg)	January 9, 1958 (aged 22)	(United States) Minnesota Golden Golphers
25	F	Buzz Schneider	5 ft 11 in (180 cm)	181 lb (82 kg)	September 14, 1954 (aged 25)	(United States) Minnesota Golden Golphers
27	F	Phil Verchota	6 ft 2 in (188 cm)	194 lb (88 kg)	December 28, 1956 (aged 23)	(United States) Minnesota Golden Golphers
28	F	John Harrington	5 ft 10 in (178 cm)	179 lb (81 kg)	May 24, 1957 (aged 22)	(United States) Minnesota Duluth Bulldogs
30	G	Jim Craig	6 ft 1 in (185 cm)	190 lb (86 kg)	May 31, 1957 (aged 22)	(United States) Boston University Terriers

== West Germany ==
Head coach: Hans Rampf

No.	Pos.	Name	Height	Weight	Birthdate	Team
1	G	Bernhard Englbrecht	5 ft 8 in (173 cm)	163 lb (74 kg)	February 16, 1958 (aged 21)	(Germany) EV Landshut
2	G	Sigmund Suttner	5 ft 8 in (173 cm)	148 lb (67 kg)	February 7, 1953 (aged 27)	(Germany) EC Deilinghofen
4	D	Udo Kießling (A)	5 ft 11 in (180 cm)	185 lb (84 kg)	May 21, 1955 (aged 24)	(Germany) Düsseldorfer EG
5	D	Harald Krüll	5 ft 11 in (180 cm)	185 lb (84 kg)	February 8, 1957 (aged 23)	(Germany) Kölner EC
6	D	Peter Scharf	5 ft 9 in (175 cm)	183 lb (83 kg)	July 15, 1953 (aged 26)	(Germany) Sportbund DJK Rosenheim
7	D	Klaus Auhuber	6 ft 1 in (185 cm)	196 lb (89 kg)	October 18, 1951 (aged 28)	(Germany) EV Landshut
8	D/F	Rainer Philipp (C)	6 ft 0 in (183 cm)	194 lb (88 kg)	March 8, 1950 (aged 29)	(Germany) Kölner EC
10	F	Franz Reindl	5 ft 11 in (180 cm)	174 lb (79 kg)	November 24, 1954 (aged 25)	(Germany) SC Riessersee
11	F	Marcus Kuhl	5 ft 10 in (178 cm)	176 lb (80 kg)	March 15, 1956 (aged 23)	(Germany) Mannheimer ERC
12	F	Martin Hinterstocker	5 ft 7 in (170 cm)	165 lb (75 kg)	July 28, 1954 (aged 25)	(Germany) Berliner SC
14	F	Uli Egen	5 ft 10 in (178 cm)	172 lb (78 kg)	August 24, 1956 (aged 23)	(Germany) SC Riessersee
16	F	Gerd Truntschka	5 ft 9 in (175 cm)	165 lb (75 kg)	September 10, 1958 (aged 21)	(Germany) Kölner EC
17	F	Hans Zach	-	-	March 30, 1949 (aged 30)	(Germany) Sportbund DJK Rosenheim
18	F	Hermann Hinterstocker	5 ft 8 in (173 cm)	163 lb (74 kg)	June 21, 1956 (aged 23)	(Germany) Berliner SC
19	F	Ernst Höfner	5 ft 10 in (178 cm)	172 lb (78 kg)	September 21, 1957 (aged 22)	(Germany) SC Riessersee
20	F	Vladímir Vacátko	6 ft 1 in (185 cm)	203 lb (92 kg)	September 15, 1952 (aged 27)	(Germany) Düsseldorfer EG
21	D	Martin Wild	5 ft 11 in (180 cm)	183 lb (83 kg)	December 2, 1952 (aged 27)	(Germany) SC Riessersee
22	F	Holger Meitinger	5 ft 11 in (180 cm)	170 lb (77 kg)	March 28, 1957 (aged 22)	(Germany) Mannheimer ERC
23	D	Horst-Peter Kretschmer	6 ft 0 in (183 cm)	196 lb (89 kg)	October 19, 1955 (aged 24)	(Germany) Düsseldorfer EG
24	D	Joachim Reil	5 ft 10 in (178 cm)	183 lb (83 kg)	May 17, 1955 (aged 24)	(Germany) SC Riessersee

== Sources ==
- Duplacey, James (1998). Total Hockey: The official encyclopedia of the National Hockey League. Total Sports. ISBN 0-8362-7114-9.
- Podnieks, Andrew (2010). IIHF Media Guide & Record Book 2011. Moydart Pres.
- Hockey Hall Of Fame page on the 1980 Olympics
- Wallechinsky, David (1988). The Complete Book of the Olympics. Penguin Books. pp. 614. ISBN 0-14-010771-1.
