= Netherlands at the 1980 Winter Olympics =

- Flag of the Netherlands
- IOC code: NED (HOL used at these Games)
- NOC: Dutch Olympic Committee

in Lake Placid
- Competitors: 29 (25 men, 4 women) in 2 sports
- Flag bearer: Piet Kleine (speed skating)
- Medals Ranked 9th: Gold 1 Silver 2 Bronze 1 Total 4

Winter Olympics appearances (overview)
- 1928; 1932; 1936; 1948; 1952; 1956; 1960; 1964; 1968; 1972; 1976; 1980; 1984; 1988; 1992; 1994; 1998; 2002; 2006; 2010; 2014; 2018; 2022; 2026

Athletes from the Netherlands competed at the 1980 Winter Olympics in Lake Placid, United States.

== Medalists ==
Medal	Name	Sport	Event
Gold	Annie Borckink	Speed skating	Women's 1500m
Silver	Piet Kleine	Speed skating	Men's 10,000m
Silver	Ria Visser	Speed skating	Women's 1500m
Bronze	Lieuwe de Boer	Speed skating	Men's 500m

== Ice hockey ==
=== First Round - Red Division ===
Team advanced to the Final Round
Team advanced to consolation round

Team	GP	W	L	T	GF	GA	Pts
Soviet Union	5	5	0	0	51	11	10
Finland	5	3	2	0	26	18	6
Canada	5	3	2	0	28	12	6
Poland	5	2	3	0	15	23	4
Netherlands	5	1	3	1	16	43	3
Japan	5	0	4	1	7	36	1

All times are local (UTC-5).

12 February 1980; 13:30	Netherlands	1 – 10 (1–2, 0–2, 0–6)	Canada	Olympic Fieldhouse, Lake Placid

Referee:
Lindgren

de Graauw (de Cloe) (SH) - 01:56	1 – 0
	1 – 1	04:04 - Primeau (Devaney)
	1 – 2	11:40 - Berry (Maxwell, O'Malley)
	1 – 3	26:52 - d'Alvise (O'Malley)
	1 – 4	35:02 - Hindmarch (Devaney) (PP)
	1 – 5	43:31 - G. Anderson (Davidson, Nill)
	1 – 6	44:14 - d'Alvise (Zupancich, Pirie)
	1 – 7	50:35 - Devaney (Primeau, Hindmarch) (PP)
	1 – 8	51:11 - Berry (Watters, Maxwell)
	1 – 9	52:22 - Berry (Maxwell, MacLean)
	1 – 10	58:11 - Hindmarch (MacLean, Davidson)

16 min
Penalties
18 min
20
Shots
40

14 February 1980; 16:30	Netherlands	4 – 17 (1–8, 1–7, 2–2)	Soviet Union	Olympic Arena, Lake Placid

Referee:
(Czechoslovakia) Vladimir Šubrt

	0 – 1	04:24 - Fetisov (Krutov, Maltsev)
	0 – 2	04:43 - Krutov (Lebedev, Kasatonov)
	0 – 3	09:59 - Vasiliev (Lebedev, Starikov) (SH)
	0 – 4	10:12 - Petrov (Pervukhin) (SH)
	0 – 5	11:43 - Kharlamov (Mikhailov, Pervukhin) (SH)
Hille (van Wieren, de Heer) (PP) - 11:51	1 – 5
	1 – 6	14:41 - Lebedev (Maltsev)
	1 – 7	16:41 - Maltsev (Zhluktov)
	1 – 8	22:02 - Lebedev (Fetisov, Maltsev)
	1 – 9	21:14 - Zhluktov (Bilyaletdinov)
	1 – 10	22:02 - Lebedev (Zhluktov, Skvortsov)
	1 – 11	24:32 - A. Golikov (V. Golikov)
	1 – 12	30:21 - A. Golikov
	1 – 13	31:07 - Krutov (Maltsev, Pervukhin)
	1 – 14	36:09 - Krutov (Lebedev, Kasatonov)
deGraauw (Klooster, de Cloe) - 33:49	2 – 14
	2 – 15	39:14 - Maltsev (Krutov)
de Cloe - 41:52	3 – 15
	3 – 16	47:12 - Makarov (V. Golikov, Starikov)
deGraauw (Klooster) - 56:14	4 – 16
	4 – 17	56:12 - Makarov (V. Golikov, A. Golikov)

14 min
Penalties
13 min
26
Shots
49

16 February 1980; 16:30	Japan	3 – 3 (3–1, 0–1, 0–1)	Netherlands	Olympic Arena, Lake Placid

Referee:
(Czechoslovakia) Vladimir Šubrt

Sakurai - 14:22	1 – 0
Urabe - 14:41	2 – 0
Urabe (Honma) - 14:41	3 – 0
	3 – 1	18:43 - van Gog (deGraauw)
	3 – 2	33:39 - de Cloe (deGraauw, Peternousek)
	3 – 3	57:15 - de Cloe (deGraauw, van Gog)

6 min
Penalties
8 min
23
Shots
27

18 February 1980; 16:30	Netherlands	5 – 3 (3–1, 2–1, 0–1)	Poland	Olympic Arena, Lake Placid

Referee:
Kompalla

Klooster (van Gog, Pluymers) - 01:39	1 – 0
	1 – 1	05:51 - Janiszewski (Zabawa) (PP)
de Heer (Peternousek, Janssen) (PP) - 08:18	2 – 1
de Heer (van Wieren, Janssen) - 13:58	3 – 1
	3 – 2	21:37 - Jobczyk (Małysiak, Janiszewski)
Klooster (van Gog, deGraauw) - 24:42	4 – 2
de Heer (van Wieren) - 36:05	5 – 2
	5 – 3	47:36 - Kokoszka (Potz)

8 min
Penalties
2 min
26
Shots
30

20 February 1980; 20:00	Finland	10 – 3 (2–1, 2–1, 6–1)	Netherlands	Olympic Arena, Lake Placid

Referee:
Kompalla

Porvari - 10:41	1 – 0
	1 – 1	18:13 - van Wieren (de Heer)
Leppänen (Litma, Eloranta) - 18:28	2 – 1
	2 – 2	30:25 - Klooster (deGraauw)
Villa (Koskinen, Saarinen) - 33:07	3 – 2
Porvari (Leinonen) - 34:12	4 – 2
Kurri (Litma, Leppänen) (PP2) - 42:35	5 – 2
Peltonen (Leppänen, Kurri) (PP) - 43:44	6 – 2
Koskinen (Eloranta) (PP) - 44:34	7 – 2
Hakulinen (Peltonen, Leppänen) - 46:10	8 – 2
Kurri (Eloranta, Hakulinen) (PP2) - 48:16	9 – 2
Haapalainen (Leinonen, Kiimalainen) - 51:03	10 – 2
	10 – 3	53:04 - Peternousek (de Heer, van Wieren)

4 min
Penalties
22 min
42
Shots
16

=== Contestants ===
- Ron Berteling
- Klaas van den Broek
- Brian de Bruijn
- John de Bruyn (G)
- Dick Decloe
- Rick van Gog
- Corky de Graauw
- Jack de Heer
- Harrie van Heumen
- Henk Hille
- Chuck Huizinga
- Jan Janssen
- William Klooster
- Patrick Kolijn
- Leo Koopmans
- Ted Lenssen (G)
- George Peternousek
- Al Pluymers
- Frank van Soldt
- Larry van Wieren

== Speed skating ==
Men

Event	Athlete	Race	
Event	Athlete	Time	Rank
500 m	Lieuwe de Boer	38.48	3rd place, bronze medalist(s)
500 m	Hilbert van der Duim	40.42	18
500 m	Bert de Jong	39.30	16
1000 m	Lieuwe de Boer	1:17.97	10
1000 m	Hilbert van der Duim	1:19.89	21
1000 m	Bert de Jong	1:17.29	6
1500 m	Hilbert van der Duim	1:59.49	11
1500 m	Bert de Jong	1:59.83	13
1500 m	Yep Kramer	DNF	–
5000 m	Hilbert van der Duim	7:07.97	4
5000 m	Piet Kleine	7:08.96	6
5000 m	Yep Kramer	7:14.09	9
10,000 m	Hilbert van der Duim	14:47.58	6
10,000 m	Piet Kleine	14:36.03	2nd place, silver medalist(s)
10,000 m	Yep Kramer	15:04.79	11

Women

Event	Athlete	Race	
Event	Athlete	Time	Rank
500 m	Annie Borckink	44.47	22
500 m	Sijtje van der Lende	44.74	26
500 m	Haitske Valentijn-Pijlman	44.02	15
1000 m	Annie Borckink	1:27.24	6
1000 m	Sijtje van der Lende	1:28.72	13
1000 m	Haitske Valentijn-Pijlman	1:28.80	14
1500 m	Annie Borckink	2:10.95 OR	1st place, gold medalist(s)
1500 m	Sijtje van der Lende	2:16.05	15
1500 m	Ria Visser	2:12.35	2nd place, silver medalist(s)
3000 m	Annie Borckink	4:47.35	13
3000 m	Sijtje van der Lende	4:51.53	16
3000 m	Ria Visser	DNF	–
