= List of Olympic men's ice hockey players for the Netherlands =

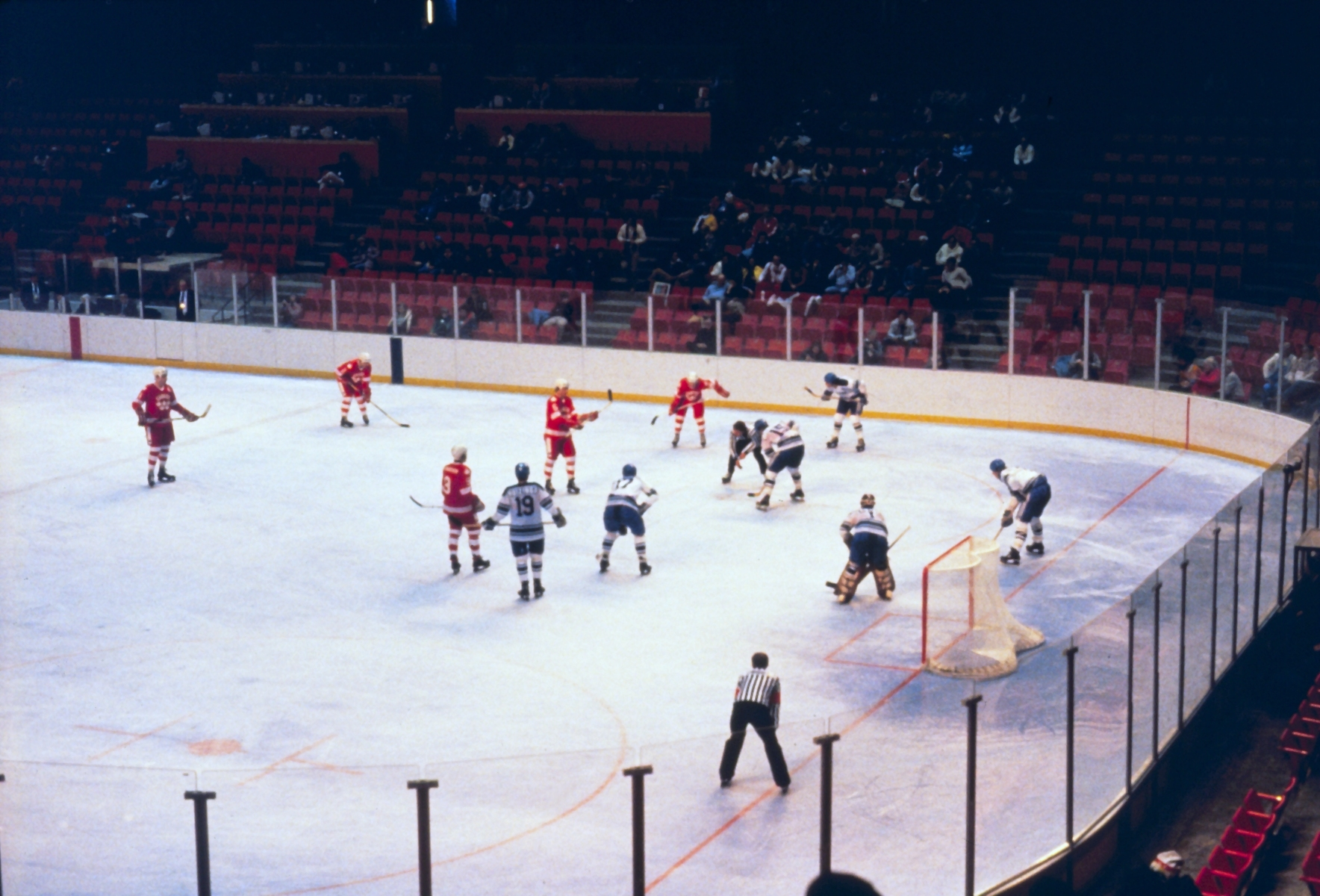
The Netherlands and Canada during the 1980 Winter Olympics, the only Olympic hockey tournament the Netherlands has participated in. Canada won the match 10–1.

The list of Olympic men's ice hockey players for the Netherlands consists of 18 skaters and 2 goaltenders. Men's ice hockey tournaments have been staged at the Olympic Games since 1920 (it was introduced at the 1920 Summer Olympics, and was permanently added to the Winter Olympic Games in 1924). The Netherlands have participated in one tournament: the 1980 Winter Olympics, where they played five preliminary-round games, and finished ninth of the twelve nations competing.

Four players (Dick Decloe, Corky de Graauw, Jack de Heer, and William Klooster) tied for the lead in goals, with 3 each, while de Graauw had the most assists, 5, and points, 8.

== Key ==
General terms
Term	Definition
GP	Games played
Ref(s)	Reference(s)

Goaltender statistical abbreviations
Abbreviation	Definition
W	Wins
L	Losses
T	Ties
Min	Minutes played
SO	Shutouts
GA	Goals against
GAA	Goals against average

Skater statistical abbreviations
Abbreviation	Definition
G	Goals
A	Assists
P	Points
PIM	Penalty minutes

== Goaltenders ==
Goaltenders
Player	GP	W	L	T	Min	SO	GA	GAA	Ref(s)
John de Bruyn	–	–	–	–	–	–	–	–	
Ted Lenssen	–	–	–	–	–	–	–	–	

== Skaters ==
Skaters
Player	GP	G	A	P	PIM	Ref(s)
Ron Berteling	5	0	0	0	0	
Brian de Bruijn	5	0	0	0	0	
Dick Decloe	5	3	2	5	6	
Corky de Graauw	5	3	5	8	12	
Jack de Heer	5	3	3	6	11	
Henk Hille	5	1	0	1	6	
Chuck Huizinga	5	0	0	0	0	
Jan Janssen	5	0	3	3	4	
William Klooster	5	3	2	5	8	
Patrick Kolijn	5	0	0	0	9	
Leo Koopmans	5	0	0	0	0	
George Peternousek	5	1	2	3	4	
Al Pluymers	5	0	1	1	2	
Klaas van den Broek	5	0	0	0	0	
Rick van Gog	5	1	3	4	2	
Harry van Heumen	5	0	0	0	0	
Frank van Soldt	5	0	0	0	0	
Larry van Wieren	5	1	4	5	2	Captain

== See also ==
- Netherlands men's national ice hockey team
