= Poland at the 1980 Winter Olympics =

- IOC code: POL
- NOC: Polish Olympic Committee
- Website: www.pkol.pl (in Polish)

in Lake Placid
- Competitors: 30 (29 men, 1 woman) in 5 sports
- Flag bearer: Józef Łuszczek (cross-country skiing)
- Medals: Gold 0 Silver 0 Bronze 0 Total 0

Winter Olympics appearances (overview)
- 1924; 1928; 1932; 1936; 1948; 1952; 1956; 1960; 1964; 1968; 1972; 1976; 1980; 1984; 1988; 1992; 1994; 1998; 2002; 2006; 2010; 2014; 2018; 2022; 2026; 2030

Poland competed at the 1980 Winter Olympics in Lake Placid, United States.

== Cross-country skiing ==
Men

| Athlete | Event | Final | |
| Athlete | Event | Time | Rank |
|---|---|---|---|
| Józef Łuszczek | 15 km | 42:59.03 | 6 |
| Józef Łuszczek | 30 km | 1'29:03.64 | 5 |
| Józef Łuszczek | 50 km | 2'36:38.05 | 17 |

== Ice hockey ==
=== First Round - Red Division ===
| Team advanced to the Final Round |
| Team advanced to Consolation round |

| Team | GP | W | L | T | GF | GA | Pts |
|---|---|---|---|---|---|---|---|
| Soviet Union | 5 | 5 | 0 | 0 | 51 | 11 | 10 |
| Finland | 5 | 3 | 2 | 0 | 26 | 18 | 6 |
| Canada | 5 | 3 | 2 | 0 | 28 | 12 | 6 |
| Poland | 5 | 2 | 3 | 0 | 15 | 23 | 4 |
| Netherlands | 5 | 1 | 3 | 1 | 16 | 43 | 3 |
| Japan | 5 | 0 | 4 | 1 | 7 | 36 | 1 |

All times are local (UTC-5).

| 12 February 1980; 20:00 | Poland | 5 – 4 (1–0, 4–3, 0–1) | Finland | Olympic Arena, Lake Placid |

Referee:
Haley

| Zabawa (Jobczyk, Małysiak) (PP) - 14:48 | 1 – 0 |
| | 1 – 1 | 21:16 - Levo (Litma, Hakulinen) (PP) |
| Zabawa (Jobczyk, Małysiak) - 27:13 | 2 – 1 |
| Kokoszka (Chowaniec) - 29:52 | 3 – 1 |
| | 3 – 2 | 30:27 - Porvari (Leinonen, Suoraniemi) |
| Jobczyk (Małysiak, Zabawa) - 33:08 | 4 – 2 |
| Kokoszka (Dziubiński, Marcinczak) - 34:40 | 5 – 2 |
| | 5 – 3 | 36:57 - Leinonen (Kiimalainen, Porvari) |
| | 5 – 4 | 46:05 - Leppänen (Levo, Peltonen) |

10 min
Penalties
4 min
25
Shots
49

| 14 February 1980; 17:00 | Poland | 1 – 5 (0–1, 1–2, 0–2) | Canada | Olympic Fieldhouse, Lake Placid |

Referee:
Kompalla

| | 0 – 1 | 03:17 - Zupancich (Pirie, d'Alvise) |
| Jobczyk (Zabawa) - 23:17 | 1 – 1 |
| | 1 – 2 | 30:56 - Watters (G. Anderson, Spring) |
| | 1 – 3 | 32:06 - Berry (Maxwell, MacLean) |
| | 1 – 4 | 47:42 - Devaney (Hindmarch, Gregg) |
| | 1 – 5 | 53:29 - Primeau |

0 min
Penalties
0 min
25
Shots
36

| 16 February 1980; 16:30 | Soviet Union | 8 – 1 (5–1, 1–0, 2–0) | Poland | Olympic Fieldhouse, Lake Placid |

Referee:
Neagles

| Skvortsov (Zhluktov) - 01:53 | 1 – 0 |
| Balderis (Zhluktov, Skvortsov) - 10:27 | 2 – 0 |
| Balderis (Zhluktov) - 10:36 | 3 – 0 |
| Mikhailov (Fetisov, Kharlamov) - 13:37 | 4 – 0 |
| | 4 – 1 | 17:15 - Małysiak (Jobczyk) (PP) |
| Balderis (Pervukhin, Bilyaletdinov) - 23:12 | 5 – 1 |
| Kharlamov - 25:19 | 6 – 1 |
| Bilyaletdinov (Kharlamov) (PP) - 43:41 | 7 – 1 |
| Maltsev (Fetisov) - 48:58 | 8 – 1 |

8 min
Penalties
6 min
60
Shots
19

| 18 February 1980; 16:30 | Netherlands | 5 – 3 (3–1, 2–1, 0–1) | Poland | Olympic Arena, Lake Placid |

Referee:
Kompalla

| Klooster (van Gog, Pluymers) - 01:39 | 1 – 0 |
| | 1 – 1 | 05:51 - Janiszewski (Zabawa) (PP) |
| de Heer (Peternousek, Janssen) (PP) - 08:18 | 2 – 1 |
| de Heer (van Wieren, Janssen) - 13:58 | 3 – 1 |
| | 3 – 2 | 21:37 - Jobczyk (Małysiak, Janiszewski) |
| Klooster (van Gog, deGraauw) - 24:42 | 4 – 2 |
| de Heer (van Wieren) - 36:05 | 5 – 2 |
| | 5 – 3 | 47:36 - Kokoszka (Potz) |

8 min
Penalties
2 min
26
Shots
30

| 20 February 1980; 16:30 | Poland | 5 – 1 (3–0, 1–0, 1–1) | Japan | Olympic Arena, Lake Placid |

Referee:
Lindgren

| Zabawa (Małysiak, Janiszewski) - 03:03 | 1 – 0 |
| Dziubiński (Kokoszka, Chowaniec) - 04:20 | 2 – 0 |
| Małysiak (Jobczyk, Zabawa) - 11:37 | 3 – 0 |
| Jobczyk (Małysiak, Zabawa) - 26:05 | 4 – 0 |
| Pytel (Marcinczak, Ujwary) (PP) - 43:57 | 5 – 0 |
| | 5 – 1 | 54:50 - Fujii (Misawa, Hanzawa) |

8 min
Penalties
12 min
53
Shots
12

| Contestants; Henryk Wojtynek; Paweł Łukaszka; Andrzej Ujwary; Henryk Janiszewski; Henryk Gruth; Andrzej Jańczy; Jerzy Potz; Ludwik Synowiec; Marek Marcińczak; Stefan Chowaniec; Wiesław Jobczyk; Tadeusz Obłój; Dariusz Sikora; Leszek Kokoszka; Andrzej Zabawa; Henryk Pytel; Stanisław Klocek; Leszek Jachna; Bogdan Dziubiński; Andrzej Małysiak |

== Nordic combined ==
Events:

- normal hill ski jumping (Three jumps, best two counted and shown here.)
- 15 km cross-country skiing

| Athlete | Event | Ski Jumping | | | | Cross-country | | | Total | |
| Athlete | Event | Distance 1 | Distance 2 | Points | Rank | Time | Points | Rank | Points | Rank |
|---|---|---|---|---|---|---|---|---|---|---|
| Jan Legierski | Individual | 74.5 | 74.0 | 183.3 | 19 | 48:00.3 | 217.630 | 2 | 400.930 | 10 |
| Józef Pawlusiak | Individual | 75.0 | 81.5 | 203.6 | 10 | 52:04.5 | 181.000 | 24 | 384.600 | 17 |
| Kazimierz Długopolski | Individual | 70.0 | 73.0 | 171.1 | 25 | 50:39.2 | 193.795 | 21 | 364.895 | 24 |
| Stanisław Kawulok | Individual | 71.5 | 71.5 | 169.1 | 28 | 50:30.9 | 195.040 | 20 | 364.140 | 26 |

== Ski jumping ==
| Athlete | Event | Jump 1 | | Jump 2 | | Total | |
| Athlete | Event | Distance | Points | Distance | Points | Points | Rank |
|---|---|---|---|---|---|---|---|
| Stanisław Pawlusiak | Normal hill | 72.0 | 94.9 | 70.0 | 88.2 | 183.1 | 40 |
| Piotr Fijas | Normal hill | 79.5 | 109.4 | 59.0 | 34.6 | 144.0 | 47 |
| Stanisław Bobak | Normal hill | 86.0 | 124.8 | 82.0 | 117.4 | 242.2 | 10 |
| Stanisław Pawlusiak | Large hill | 92.0 | 92.5 | 88.5 | 86.6 | 179.1 | 43 |
| Stanisław Bobak | Large hill | 104.0 | 112.3 | 97.0 | 102.0 | 214.3 | 22 |
| Piotr Fijas | Large hill | 107.0 | 118.0 | 101.0 | 108.1 | 226.1 | 14 |

== Speed skating ==
Men

| Event | Athlete | Race | |
| Event | Athlete | Time | Rank |
|---|---|---|---|
| 500 m | Jan Józwik | 39.01 | 9 |
| 1000 m | Jan Józwik | 1:18.83 | 13 |

Women

| Event | Athlete | Race | |
| Event | Athlete | Time | Rank |
|---|---|---|---|
| 500 m | Erwina Ryś-Ferens | 43.52 | 11 |
| 1000 m | Erwina Ryś-Ferens | 1:28.82 | 16 |
| 1500 m | Erwina Ryś-Ferens | 2:16.29 | 17 |
| 3000 m | Erwina Ryś-Ferens | 4:37.89 | 5 |
