= Tjakko de Vos =

Dutch ice hockey player

- Born: July 2, 1956 (age 68); Rotterdam, Netherlands
- Position: Forward
- Played for: Amsterdam Tigers (Netherlands)
- National team: Netherlands
- NHL draft: Undrafted
- Playing career: 1980–2012

Tjakko de Vos (born July 2, 1956) is a Dutch former professional ice hockey player.

He competed as a member of the Netherlands men's national ice hockey team at the 1981 World Ice Hockey Championships.
