= 1966–67 Eredivisie (ice hockey) season =

Dutch ice hockey season

The 1966–67 Eredivisie season was the seventh season of the Eredivisie, the top level of ice hockey in the Netherlands. Five teams participated in the league, and HYS Den Haag won the championship.

== Regular season ==
	Club	GP	W	T	L	GF	GA	Pts
1.	H.H.IJ.C. Den Haag	8	8	0	0	98	11	16
2.	S.IJ. Den Bosch	8	5	1	2	57	31	11
3.	T.IJ.S.C. Tilburg	8	3	2	3	49	68	8
4.	Amstel Tijgers Amsterdam	8	2	1	5	35	60	5
5.	HC Rotterdam	8	0	0	8	8	77	0
