= Małysiak =

Małysiak is a Polish surname. Notable people with the surname include:

- Albin Małysiak (1917–2011), Polish bishop
- Andrzej Małysiak (born 1957), Polish ice hockey player
