= 1967–68 Eredivisie (ice hockey) season =

Dutch ice hockey season

The 1967–68 Eredivisie season was the eighth season of the Eredivisie, the top level of ice hockey in the Netherlands. Five teams participated in the league, and HYS Den Haag won the championship.

== Regular season ==
	Club	GP	W	T	L	GF	GA	Pts
1.	H.H.IJ.C. Den Haag	8	7	1	0	78	16	15
2.	T.IJ.S.C. Tilburg	8	6	0	2	47	38	12
3.	S.IJ. Den Bosch	8	2	1	5	29	38	5
4.	HC Rotterdam	8	2	1	5	26	56	5
5.	Amstel Tijgers Amsterdam	8	1	1	6	23	55	3
