= Pluimers =

Pluimers is a surname. Notable people with the surname include:

- Ilse Pluimers (born 2002), Dutch cyclist
- Rick Pluimers (born 2000), Dutch cyclist
- Allen Pluimers (born 1957), Dutch-Canadian ice hockey player
