= Chuck Huizinga =

Dutch-Canadian ice hockey player

- Born: October 29, 1953 (age 71); Sarnia, Ontario, Canada
- Height: 6 ft 0 in (183 cm)
- Weight: 213 lb (97 kg; 15 st 3 lb)
- Position: Defence
- Played for: Amstel Tijgers
- National team: Netherlands
- NHL draft: Undrafted
- Playing career: 1978–1981

Cornelius Huizinga (born October 29, 1953) is a former Dutch-Canadian ice hockey player.

Huizinga competed as a member of the Netherlands men's national ice hockey team at the 1981 World Ice Hockey Championships, and he played for Team Netherlands at the 1980 Winter Olympics in Lake Placid.
