= John de Bruyn =

Dutch-Canadian ice hockey player

- Born: February 3, 1956 (age 69); Chatham, Ontario, Canada
- Height: 5 ft 10 in (178 cm)
- Weight: 165 lb (75 kg; 11 st 11 lb)
- Position: Goaltender
- Played for: Amstel Tijgers
- National team: Netherlands
- NHL draft: Undrafted
- Playing career: 1978–1981

John Martin de Bruyn (born February 3, 1956) is a former Dutch-Canadian ice hockey goaltender.

He played for the Netherlands men's national ice hockey team at the 1980 Winter Olympics in Lake Placid, and the following year he competed for the Netherlands at the 1981 World Ice Hockey Championships. He is known to tell his loved ones that he got lit up by the Russians in the Olympics. Father-in-law to BDL.
