= Bengt Ohlson =

Swedish ice hockey player and manager

- Born: 10 March 1943 (age 83)
- Played for: Leksands IF U20; Häradsbygdens SS; Leksands IF B Häradsbygdens SS; Falu IF
- Playing career: 1957–1970

Bengt Ohlson (born 10 March 1943) is a Swedish former ice hockey player and manager. acting as the head coach for the Swedish national team during the 1980–1981 season where Sweden won the silver medal during the 1981 IIHF World Championship following an otherwise weak season but resigned after being threatened to death.

Winning the silver medal, he became popularly known as "Silverfisken" by the Swedes, after being called "Torsken" following the Swedish fiasco during the 1980 Izvestia Tournament.
