= Leo Koopmans =

Dutch ice hockey player

- Born: November 28, 1953 (age 72) Barrie, Ontario, Canada
- Height: 6 ft 5 in (196 cm)
- Weight: 213 lb (97 kg; 15 st 3 lb)
- Position: Forward
- Shot: Left
- Played for: HYS Veronixa 538; Heerenveen Flyers; Amsterdam Tigers; Nijmegen Tigers; GIJS Groningen
- National team: Netherlands
- NHL draft: Undrafted
- Playing career: 1972–1987

Leo Donald Koopmans (born November 28, 1953) is a former Dutch international ice hockey forward. Koopmans played 15 seasons in the Eredivisie, becoming the league's top scorer for 1977-8. He was born in Barrie, Ontario and since his retirement has continued to reside in the Barrie area where he owns a successful swimming pool construction business.

A 196 cm, 97 kg forward, Koopmans first played in the Dutch top division with HYS Veronica 538 in 1972. The next season, he left The Hague to join the Heerenveen Flyers. In 1975 he played for Tigers Amsterdam and for 1976-7 Nijmegen Tigers. Koopmans rejoined Heerenveen for 1977-8 and won the league's scoring title with 39 goals and 40 assists in 30 games. He remained with the Flyers until 1984, when he joined GIJS Groningen. He retired from top-level play in 1987.

He played 20 times for the Netherlands at an international level, including at the 1980 Winter Olympics. Koopmans went scoreless in all 5 of the Netherlands games in Lake Placid as the team finished 8th. He played in two world championships. In 1981, the only time the country has competed in the contest's top tier, Koopmans scored 4 goals and an assist in 8 games. In Pool B in 1987, he scored 5 goals and collected 5 assists in 7 games.
