= Trevor Sherban =

- Born: December 11, 1972 (age 53) Edmonton, AB, CAN
- Height: 6 ft 2 in (188 cm)
- Weight: 195 lb (88 kg; 13 st 13 lb)
- Position: Defence
- Shot: Left
- Played for: IHL; Kansas City Blades; CHL; Wichita Thunder; UHL; Missouri River Otters; WCHL; San Diego Gulls; Europe; Amsterdam Bulldogs; Amstel Tijgers; HC Milano; HC Appiano; Newcastle North Stars; EC Bad Tölz
- NHL draft: Undrafted
- Playing career: 1997–2008

Trevor Sherban (born December 11, 1972) is a Canadian former professional ice hockey and inline hockey defenceman.

Sherban played major junior hockey in the Western Hockey League (WHL). He went on to play eleven seasons of professional hockey, including two seasons in the West Coast Hockey League (WCHL) with the San Diego Gulls where he was recognized for his outstanding play when he was named to the 2001–02 WCHL First All-Star Team.

== Awards and honours ==
Award	Year
WCHL First All-Star Team	2001–02

- 2002-03 WCHL Playoffs Most Goals by Defenseman (3)
- 2002-03 WCHL Taylor Cup Champion
- 2005-06 Italy Champion

== Roller Hockey International ==
Sherban played four seasons of major professional inline hockey within Roller Hockey International, the first major professional league for inline hockey which operated in North America from 1993 to 1999. He played the 1993 RHI inaugural season with the Portland Rage, 1994 with the Tampa-Bay Tritons, 1996 with the Oklahoma Coyotes, and 1997 with the San Jose Rhinos.
