= 1989–90 OB I bajnoksag season =

Hungarian ice hockey season

The 1989–90 OB I bajnokság season was the 53rd season of the OB I bajnokság, the top level of ice hockey in Hungary. Seven teams participated in the league, and Lehel SE Jaszbereny won the championship.

== Regular season ==
	Club	GP	W	T	L	Goals	Pts
1.	Lehel SE Jászberény	24	21	2	1	243:67	44
2.	Ferencvárosi TC	24	19	1	4	226:78	39
3.	Újpesti Dózsa SC	24	17	3	4	258:86	37
4.	Miskolci Kinizsi	24	8	1	15	120:190	17
5.	Alba Volán Székesfehérvár	24	7	2	15	119:182	16
6.	Nepstadion Sz.E. Budapest	24	6	1	17	88:211	13
7.	Sziketherm HK Dunaújváros	24	1	0	23	82:332	2

== Playoffs ==
=== 5th place ===
- Alba Volán Székesfehérvár - Nepstadion Sz.E. Budapest 2:0 (6:2, 4:2)

=== 3rd place ===
- Újpesti Dózsa SC - Miskolci Kinizsi 3:0 (22:6, 10:6, 7:3 abg.)

=== Final ===
- Lehel SE Jászberény - Ferencvárosi TC 3:1 (8:1, 4:5, 8:3, 4:1)
