= Knut Fjeldsgaard =

Norwegian ice hockey player

Personal information
- Born: 19 May 1952 (age 73) Oslo, Norway

Sport
- Sport: Ice hockey
- Club: IF Frisk Asker Vaalerengen

Knut Andreas Fjeldsgaard (born 19 May 1952) is a Norwegian former ice hockey player who played for the club IF Frisk Asker. He was born in Oslo. He played for the Norwegian national ice hockey team at the 1980 Winter Olympics.
