= Norio Ito =

Japanese ice hockey player

Personal information
- Nationality: Japanese
- Born: 18 July 1948 (age 76); Hokkaido, Japan

Sport
- Sport: Ice hockey

Norio Ito (伊東 徳雄, Itō Norio, born 18 July 1948) is a Japanese ice hockey player. He competed in the men's tournament at the 1980 Winter Olympics.
