= Ted Lenssen =

Dutch-Canadian ice hockey player

- Born: May 17, 1952 (age 72); Oakville, Ontario, Canada
- Height: 5 ft 10 in (178 cm)
- Weight: 174 lb (79 kg; 12 st 6 lb)
- Position: Goaltender
- Caught: Left
- Played for: Des Moines Capitols; Omaha Knights; Johnstown Jets; Kalamazoo Wings; Heerenveen Flyers
- National team: Netherlands
- NHL draft: Undrafted
- Playing career: 1972–1982

Theodore Gerardus Maria Lenssen (born May 17, 1952) is a former Dutch-Canadian ice hockey goaltender.

Lenssen played for the Netherlands men's national ice hockey team at the 1980 Winter Olympics in Lake Placid, and the following year he competed for the Netherlands at the 1981 World Ice Hockey Championships.
