= Bert de Jong (speed skater) =

Dutch speed skater

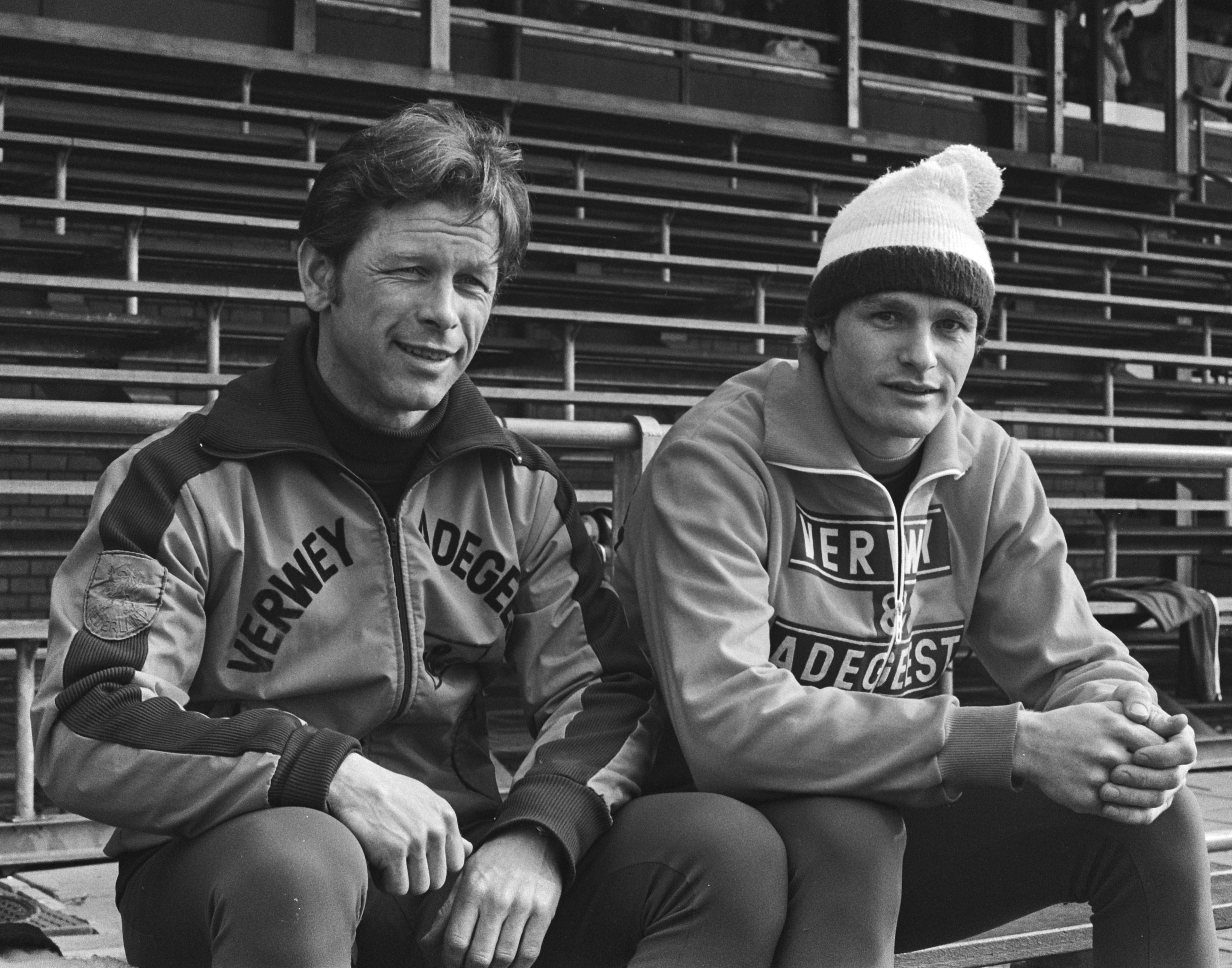
- Bert de Jong with coach Henk Gemser in 1977

Personal information
- Born: 12 June 1955 (age 71) Grouw, Netherlands

Sport
- Country: Netherlands
- Sport: Speed skating

Bert de Jong (born 12 June 1955) is a former speed skater from the Netherlands. He competed at the 1980 Winter Olympics in 500, 1000 and 1500 m and finished in 16th, 6th and 13th place, respectively.

Personal bests:

- 500 m – 38.60 (1980)
- 1000 m – 1:16.18 (1980)
- 1500 m – 1:59.83 (1980)
- 5000 m – 7:48.97 (1976)
- 10000 m – 17:21.74 (1976)
