= Henk Hille =

Dutch ice hockey player

- Born: 16 May 1959 (age 65); Amsterdam, NED
- Height: 5 ft 11 in (180 cm)
- Weight: 170 lb (77 kg; 12 st 2 lb)
- Position: Defence
- Played for: Amstel Tijgers; Rögle BK; Malmö IF Redhawks; Heerenveen Flyers; Osby IK; Rotterdam Panda's; Utrecht Dragons
- National team: Netherlands
- Playing career: 1979–1993

Henk Hille (born 16 May 1959) is a Dutch former professional ice hockey player. A defenceman, he played three seasons in the Allsvenskan in the mid-1980s and 48 times for the Netherlands national ice hockey team including all their contests at the 1980 Winter Olympics.

From Amsterdam, Hille began his senior team career with Tigers Amsterdam in 1979. In Lake Placid, he scored one goal against the USSR.

For 1985-6 he played with Rögle BK, where he had 8 goals and 10 assists in 30 games. The following season for Malmö IF Redhawks and scored 4 goals and 6 assists in 28 matches. Following some time with Dutch club Heerenveen Flyers, he spent 1989–90 with Osby IK.

Hille returned to Dutch club hockey joining Rotterdam Panda's for 1990–1. He then finished his playing career with IJshockey Club Utrecht, where he spent the next two seasons.
