= Valeri Vasiliev =

Russian ice hockey player (1949–2012)

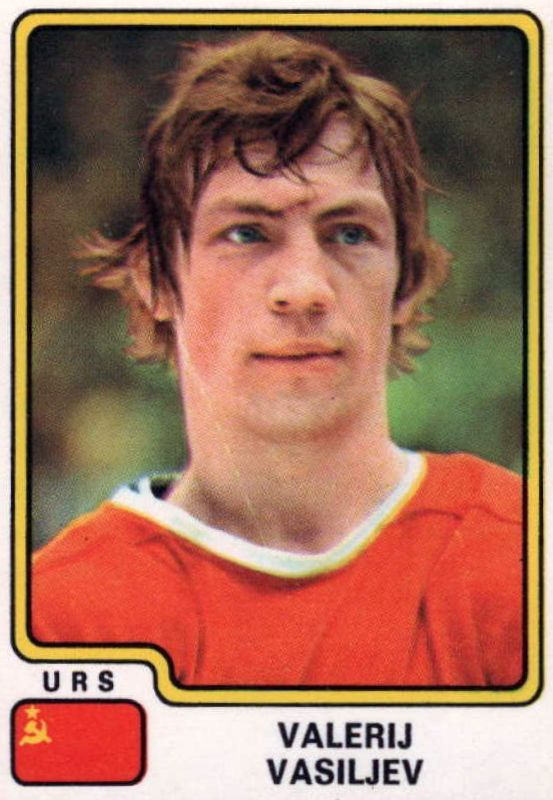
- Born: 3 August 1949 Gorky, Russian SFSR, Soviet Union
- Died: 19 April 2012 (aged 62)
- Height: 5 ft 11 in (180 cm)
- Weight: 185 lb (84 kg; 13 st 3 lb)
- Position: Defence
- Shot: Left
- Played for: Torpedo Gorky; Dynamo Moscow; Újpesti TE
- National team: Soviet Union
- Playing career: 1966–1984; 1989–1990
Medal record
Men's ice hockey
Representing the Soviet Union
Winter Olympics
| Gold medal – first place | 1972 Sapporo |
| Gold medal – first place | 1976 Innsbruck |
| Silver medal – second place | 1980 Lake Placid |

Valeri Ivanovich Vasiliev (Russian: Валерий Иванович Васильев; 3 August 1949 – 19 April 2012) was a Russian ice hockey defenceman, who played for Dynamo Moscow. Internationally he competed for the Soviet Union. An eight-time Soviet all-star, Vasiliev was captain of the national team, for which he played 13 years, and was inducted into the International Ice Hockey Federation Hall of Fame in 1998. He was born in Gorky, Soviet Union.

== Playing career ==
Vasiliev played on nine Soviet gold medal teams at the IIHF World Championships. He was named the tournament's best defenceman in 1973, 1977, and 1979 and was a five-time all-star. He was on the gold medal team at the 1972 and 1976 Winter Olympics, as well as at the 1981 Canada Cup, where he captained the winning team. He also played in the 1972 Summit Series, 1974 Summit Series, 1976 Canada Cup, and 1980 Winter Olympics. He coined the phrase "kiss the ice" after winning in 1972 Winter Olympics. He played in the Soviet Championship League from 1967 to 1984, playing more games than anyone else in the league's history. Vasiliev was inducted into the International Ice Hockey Federation Hall of Fame in 1998.

In 1978 Vasiliev was awarded the Order of the Red Banner of Labour. Vasiliev, who had won the 1978 world championship not long after he had suffered a heart attack, died from heart failure in 2012.

== Career statistics ==
=== Regular season ===
| | | | Regular season |
| Season | Team | League | GP | G | A | Pts | PIM |
|---|---|---|---|---|---|---|---|
| 1966–67 | Torpedo Gorky | USSR | 2 | 0 | 0 | 0 | 0 |
| 1967–68 | Dynamo Moscow | USSR | 42 | 2 | 1 | 3 | 28 |
| 1968–69 | Dynamo Moscow | USSR | 34 | 2 | 1 | 3 | 34 |
| 1969–70 | Dynamo Moscow | USSR | 43 | 5 | 2 | 7 | 37 |
| 1970–71 | Dynamo Moscow | USSR | 40 | 2 | 4 | 6 | 36 |
| 1971–72 | Dynamo Moscow | USSR | 31 | 4 | 0 | 4 | 35 |
| 1972–73 | Dynamo Moscow | USSR | 29 | 3 | 1 | 4 | 59 |
| 1973–74 | Dynamo Moscow | USSR | 31 | 4 | 11 | 15 | 42 |
| 1974–75 | Dynamo Moscow | USSR | 34 | 7 | 5 | 12 | 34 |
| 1975–76 | Dynamo Moscow | USSR | 28 | 6 | 15 | 21 | 13 |
| 1976–77 | Dynamo Moscow | USSR | 34 | 3 | 12 | 15 | 21 |
| 1977–78 | Dynamo Moscow | USSR | 33 | 2 | 6 | 8 | 30 |
| 1978–79 | Dynamo Moscow | USSR | 42 | 6 | 14 | 20 | 26 |
| 1979–80 | Dynamo Moscow | USSR | 41 | 8 | 10 | 18 | 26 |
| 1980–81 | Dynamo Moscow | USSR | 43 | 6 | 7 | 13 | 16 |
| 1981–82 | Dynamo Moscow | USSR | 36 | 3 | 12 | 15 | 18 |
| 1982–83 | Dynamo Moscow | USSR | 32 | 5 | 7 | 12 | 16 |
| 1983–84 | Dynamo Moscow | USSR | 44 | 3 | 7 | 10 | 14 |
| 1989–90 | Újpesti Dózsa SC | HUN | 15 | 3 | 5 | 8 | — |
| 1990–91 | EC Ratingen | GER-2 | 15 | 1 | 3 | 4 | 12 |
| USSR totals | | | 619 | 71 | 115 | 186 | 485 |

=== International ===
| Year | Team | Event | GP | G | A | Pts | PIM |
|---|---|---|---|---|---|---|---|
| 1968 | Soviet Union | EJC | 5 | 2 | 0 | 2 | 2 |
| 1969 | Soviet Union | EJC | 5 | 1 | — | — | — |
| 1970 | Soviet Union | WC | 6 | 0 | 0 | 0 | 2 |
| 1972 | Soviet Union | OLY | 2 | 0 | 0 | 0 | 2 |
| 1972 | Soviet Union | WC | 9 | 2 | 2 | 4 | 2 |
| 1972 | Soviet Union | SS | 8 | 1 | 2 | 3 | 6 |
| 1973 | Soviet Union | WC | 10 | 0 | 7 | 7 | 6 |
| 1974 | Soviet Union | WC | 10 | 0 | 6 | 6 | 16 |
| 1974 | Soviet Union | SS | 8 | 3 | 1 | 4 | 7 |
| 1975 | Soviet Union | WC | 10 | 2 | 4 | 6 | 0 |
| 1976 | Soviet Union | OLY | 6 | 1 | 2 | 3 | 2 |
| 1976 | Soviet Union | WC | 10 | 5 | 2 | 7 | 8 |
| 1976 | Soviet Union | CC | 5 | 0 | 3 | 3 | 6 |
| 1977 | Soviet Union | WC | 10 | 1 | 2 | 3 | 8 |
| 1978 | Soviet Union | WC | 10 | 3 | 3 | 6 | 6 |
| 1979 | Soviet Union | WC | 8 | 1 | 3 | 4 | 0 |
| 1980 | Soviet Union | OLY | 7 | 2 | 1 | 3 | 2 |
| 1981 | Soviet Union | WC | 8 | 0 | 0 | 0 | 2 |
| 1981 | Soviet Union | CC | 6 | 0 | 1 | 1 | 8 |
| 1982 | Soviet Union | WC | 10 | 1 | 2 | 3 | 0 |
| Senior totals | | | 143 | 22 | 41 | 63 | 63 |
