= William Klooster =

Dutch ice hockey player

- Born: December 25, 1957 (age 67); Amsterdam, NED
- Height: 6 ft 1 in (185 cm)
- Weight: 192 lb (87 kg; 13 st 10 lb)
- Position: Defence
- Played for: Amstel Tijgers; ESV Trier 's-Hertogenbosch Red Eagles
- National team: Netherlands
- Playing career: 1977–1990

William Eduard Antonio Klooster (born December 25, 1957) is a former Dutch ice hockey player, born in Amsterdam, North Holland. A defenceman, he competed for the Netherlands national ice hockey team at both the 1980 Winter Olympics and the 1981 World Ice Hockey Championships.

Klooster began his senior club career in 1977 with Tigers Amsterdam. He played intermittently with Tigers until 1989 when he joined 's-Hertogenbosch Red Eagles for a season. He played for Regionalliga side Trier Huskies in 1989–90.

As a member of the Netherlands men's national ice hockey team, Klooster had an offensive Olympic campaign in Lake Placid, scoring 3 goals and collecting 5 points in 5 games. He went scoreless in all 8 of Netherlands's games at the 1981 World Ice Hockey Championships the following year.
