= Wiesław Jobczyk =

Polish ice hockey player

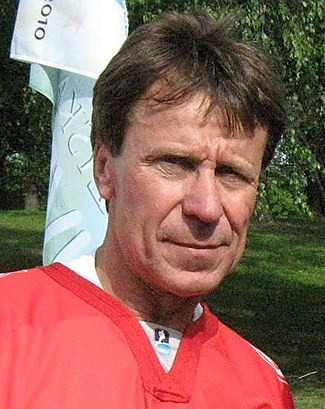
- Born: February 23, 1954 (age 72) Siedlce, Poland
- Height: 5 ft 8 in (173 cm)
- Weight: 170 lb (77 kg; 12 st 2 lb)
- Position: Right wing
- Played for: Pogoń Siedlce; Baildon Katowice; Zagłębie Sosnowiec; Duisburger SC; EC Ratingen; GSC Moers; Duisburger SV
- National team: Poland
- NHL draft: Undrafted
- Playing career: 1975–1991

Wiesław Jerzy Jobczyk (born February 23, 1954) is a former Polish ice hockey player. He played for the Poland men's national ice hockey team at the 1976 Winter Olympics in Innsbruck, the 1980 Winter Olympics in Lake Placid, and the 1984 Winter Olympics in Sarajevo. In total he represented Poland in 125 games, scoring 88 goals. His hat-trick in a 6:4 victory against the overwhelming favorites Soviet Union at the 1976 Ice Hockey World Championships in Katowice became an iconic moment in Polish hockey history. Playing as a forward, his usual linemates were Andrzej Zabawa and Leszek Kokoszka. At club level he won five Polish championship titles with Zagłębie Sosnowiec between 1980 and 1985. After his playing career he has among other duties appeared as a television commentator for Telewizja Polska. He was awarded the Gold Cross of Merit by the President of Poland in 2005.
