= Jan Józwik =

Polish speed skater (1952–2021)

Personal information
- Nationality: Polish
- Born: 16 March 1952 Luboszewy, Poland
- Died: 8 December 2021 (aged 69) Zakopane, Poland

Sport
- Sport: Speed skating

Jan Józwik (16 March 1952 – 8 December 2021) was a Polish speed skater. He competed in two events at the 1980 Winter Olympics.

Józwik died from COVID-19 in Zakopane on 8 December 2021, at the age of 69.
