= Holger Meitinger =

German ice hockey player (born 1957)

Personal information
- Nationality: German
- Born: 28 March 1957 (age 69) Augsburg, West Germany

Sport
- Sport: Ice hockey

Holger Meitinger (born 28 March 1957) is a German ice hockey player. He competed in the men's tournament at the 1980 Winter Olympics. He was the scoring leader at the 1981 Ice Hockey World Championships.
