= Corky de Graauw =

Dutch ice hockey player

- Born: February 23, 1951 (age 74); Bladel, Netherlands
- Height: 6 ft 0 in (183 cm)
- Weight: 183 lb (83 kg; 13 st 1 lb)
- Position: Forward
- Played for: Long Island Ducks; Fort Wayne Komets; Amstel Tijgers
- National team: Netherlands
- Playing career: 1971–1981

Cornell de Graauw (born February 23, 1951) is a former Dutch ice hockey player. He was born in Bladel.

De Graauw played ten games over the two seasons between 1968 and 1970 with the Kitchener Rangers. He played professionally in the United States the following year, scoring an assist in his only game with the Fort Wayne Komets and 64 points in 72 games for the Long Island Ducks.

De Graauw spent his Dutch pro career exclusively with Tigers Amsterdam, scoring better than two points a game. He scored an impressive 8 points in five games for the national team at the 1980 Winter Olympics, including two goals against the powerhouse Soviet Union team, and one against Canada.
