= Hideo Urabe =

Japanese ice hockey player

Personal information
- Nationality: Japanese
- Born: 7 April 1951 (age 75) Hokkaido, Japan

Sport
- Sport: Ice hockey

Achievements and titles
- Olympic finals: 1976 Winter Olympics, 1980 Winter Olympics

Hideo Urabe (浦辺 秀夫, Urabe Hideo; born 7 April 1951) is a Japanese ice hockey player. He competed in the men's tournaments at the 1976 Winter Olympics and the 1980 Winter Olympics.
