= Bogdan Dziubiński =

Polish ice hockey player

- Born: January 1, 1958 (age 68) Nowy Targ, Poland
- Height: 5 ft 9 in (175 cm)
- Weight: 176 lb (80 kg; 12 st 8 lb)
- Position: Right wing
- Played for: Podhale Nowy Targ
- National team: Poland
- NHL draft: Undrafted

Bogdan Krzysztof Dziubiński (born January 1, 1958) is a former Polish ice hockey player. He played for the Poland men's national ice hockey team at the 1980 Winter Olympics in Lake Placid.
