= Dick Decloe =

Canadian ice hockey player

- Born: 20 May 1953 (age 72) Amsterdam, Netherlands
- Height: 6 ft 4 in (193 cm)
- Weight: 203 lb (92 kg; 14 st 7 lb)
- Position: Right wing
- Shot: Left
- Played for: Hijs Hokij Den Haag; Krefelder EV; Kölner EC; Düsseldorfer EG; SC Bern
- National team: Netherlands
- Playing career: 1973–1986

Dick Decloe (born 20 May 1953) is a Dutch–Canadian former professional ice hockey player. A Memorial Cup winner, Decloe spent most of his playing career as a top scorer in the first German Bundesliga. Decloe played internationally for the Netherlands.

Decloe was a member of the 1973 Toronto Marlboros Memorial Cup championship team. He began his pro career with IJHC Den Haag of the Eredivisie in 1973. Decloe spent the next 8 seasons in the Bundesliga, 1974 to 1978 and 1980–81 with Krefeld Pinguine, 1978–79 with Kölner EC, and 1979–80 and 1981–82 with Düsseldorfer EG. He was the league's top point getter three times (1974–75, 1976–77, and 1980–81), top goal scorer four times (1974-5, 1975–76, 1976–77, and 1977–78). He was named to the league All-Star team for 1976–77.

Internationally, Decloe began representing the Netherlands in 1974 in the World Championships. He scored 5 points in 5 games at the Winter Olympics in Lake Placid, as the Dutch finished in 9th place.

Dick Decloe currently resides in Canada and ran a successful hockey training programme in Oakville, Ontario, Canada until his retirement. He was the warehouse manager for the Mississauga ReStore, part of Habitat for Humanity Halton-Mississauga, before retiring to Ottawa with his wife.

• BSc, Business Management – Boston University • NCAA Hockey Scholarship, Boston University • Assistant Team Canada Coach...Spengler Cup 1993 • 21 Yrs. Player & Coach...European Pro Hockey 1973–94 • Voted "Best Foreign Player of the Decade" 1970–1980
