= Stefan Chowaniec =

Polish ice hockey player

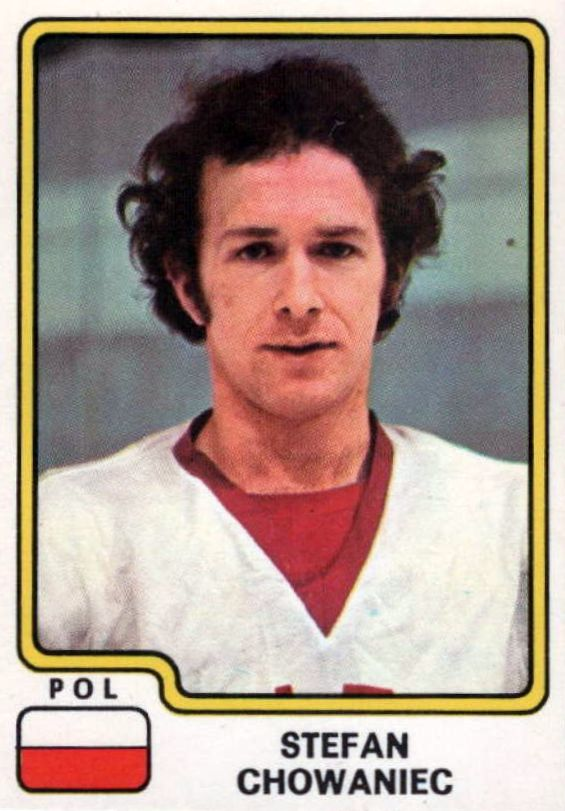
- Born: April 23, 1953 (age 71); Nowy Targ, Poland
- Height: 5 ft 5 in (165 cm)
- Weight: 148 lb (67 kg; 10 st 8 lb)
- Position: Left wing
- Played for: Podhale Nowy Targ
- National team: Poland
- NHL draft: Undrafted
- Playing career: 1969–1982

Stefan Wojciech Chowaniec (born April 23, 1953) is a former Polish ice hockey player. He played for the Poland men's national ice hockey team at the 1972 Winter Olympics in Sapporo, the 1976 Winter Olympics in Innsbruck, and the 1980 Winter Olympics in Lake Placid.
