= Jan Janssen (ice hockey) =

American ice hockey player (born 1952)

- Born: October 17, 1952 (age 73) Chicago Heights, Illinois, U.S.
- Height: 6 ft 0 in (183 cm)
- Weight: 170 lb (77 kg; 12 st 2 lb)
- Position: Right wing
- Played for: Heerenveen Flyers
- National team: Netherlands
- Playing career: 1975–1987

Jan Petrus Leonardus Janssen (born October 17, 1952) is a former professional ice hockey player. Of Dutch descent, he played several years for Dutch club Heerenveen Flyers as well as for the Netherlands national ice hockey team. He was born in Chicago Heights, Illinois.

A forward, Janssen played a total of 12 seasons with Heerenveen between 1975 and 1987. His best points total for a season came in 1978-9 when he collected 75 points in 43 games.

Janssen played in the 1980 Winter Olympics and 1981 World Ice Hockey Championships for the Dutch, the only two times that the national team played in the top tier internationally. He had 3 assists in the 5 games the Netherlands played. At the 1981 World Championship, he had a goal and two assists in 8 games.
