= Patrick Kolijn =

Dutch ice hockey player

- Born: January 9, 1957 (age 68); The Hague, NED
- Position: Defence
- Played for: Red Eagles 's-Hertogenbosch
- National team: Netherlands
- NHL draft: Undrafted
- Playing career: 1977–1980

Patrick Cornelis Jacobus Kolijn (born January 9, 1957) is a former Dutch ice hockey player. He played for the Netherlands men's national ice hockey team at the 1980 Winter Olympics in Lake Placid.
