= George Peternousek =

Dutch ice hockey player

- Born: March 11, 1947 (age 79) Prague, TCH
- Height: 6 ft 0 in (183 cm)
- Weight: 194 lb (88 kg; 13 st 12 lb)
- Position: Defence
- Played for: Tilburg Trappers
- National team: Netherlands
- Playing career: 1971–1981

George Peternousek (Czech: Jiří Petrnoušek) (born March 11, 1947) is a former professional ice hockey player.

Born in Prague, Czechoslovakia, Peternousek later became a naturalized Dutch citizen and competed for the Netherlands national ice hockey team at both the 1980 Winter Olympics and the 1981 World Ice Hockey Championships.

A defenceman, Peternousek scored a goal and two assists in all 5 of Holland's games in Lake Placid. He had two assists in 8 games at the World Championships the following year.

Peternousek played for thirteen years with Dutch club Tilburg Trappers.

Sadly George died on October 28, 2026 in Tilburg.
