= Klaas van den Broek =

Dutch ice hockey player

- Born: July 7, 1955 (age 69); Tilburg, Netherlands
- Height: 6 ft 3 in (191 cm)
- Weight: 187 lb (85 kg; 13 st 5 lb)
- Position: Centre
- Shot: Left
- Played for: Tilburg Trappers
- National team: Netherlands
- Playing career: 1969–1985

Nicolaas Gerardus Maria "Klaas" van den Broek (born July 7, 1955) is a former professional Dutch ice hockey player, who was born in Tilburg, North Brabant.

Van den Broek played for the Tilburg Trappers during the 1970s. He played all five matches for the Netherlands at the 1980 Winter Olympics.
