= Brian de Bruijn =

Dutch-Canadian ice hockey player

- Born: September 4, 1954 (age 70); Chatham, Ontario, Canada
- Height: 5 ft 10 in (178 cm)
- Weight: 185 lb (84 kg; 13 st 3 lb)
- Position: Forward
- Played for: Tilburg Trappers; Nijmegen Tigers; Heerenveen Flyers
- National team: Netherlands
- NHL draft: Undrafted
- Playing career: 1972–1986

Brian Austin de Bruijn (born September 4, 1954) is a former Dutch-Canadian ice hockey player. He played for the Netherlands men's national ice hockey team at the 1980 Winter Olympics in Lake Placid.
