= Andrzej Jańczy =

Polish ice hockey player (born 1954)

- Born: 14 July 1954 (age 71) Nowy Targ, Poland
- Height: 5 ft 7 in (170 cm)
- Weight: 161 lb (73 kg; 11 st 7 lb)
- Position: Left wing
- Played for: Podhale Nowy Targ
- National team: Poland
- NHL draft: Undrafted
- Playing career: 1979–1980

Andrzej Jańczy (born 14 July 1954) is a former Polish ice hockey player. He played for the Poland men's national ice hockey team at 1980 Winter Olympics in Lake Placid.
