= Frank van Soldt =

Dutch ice hockey player

- Born: July 28, 1953 (age 71); Amsterdam, NED
- Height: 6 ft 0 in (183 cm)
- Weight: 179 lb (81 kg; 12 st 11 lb)
- Position: Forward
- Played for: Heerenveen Flyers
- National team: Netherlands
- NHL draft: Undrafted
- Playing career: 1977–1980

Franklin Richard van Soldt (born July 28, 1953) is a former Dutch ice hockey player. He played for the Netherlands men's national ice hockey team at the 1980 Winter Olympics in Lake Placid.
