= Rick van Gog =

Canadian-Dutch ice hockey player

- Born: April 3, 1956 (age 70) Aurora, Ontario, Canada
- Height: 5 ft 11 in (180 cm)
- Weight: 185 lb (84 kg; 13 st 3 lb)
- Position: Defence
- Played for: GIJS Groningen; HYS Den Haag; Diö GoIF; Rotterdam Panda's
- National team: Netherlands
- NHL draft: Undrafted
- Playing career: 1977–1987

Richard van Gog (born April 3, 1957) is a former professional ice hockey player. A Canadian of Dutch descent, he played in the Netherlands mostly for GIJS Groningen and also spent the 1983–84 season with Diö GoIF in Sweden. He was also a member of the Netherlands national ice hockey team.

A defenceman, Van Gog played a season in the OHA with the Sault Ste. Marie Greyhounds. He joined Groningen in 1977 and remained with the club to 1987. His best offensive season was 1979-80 when he scored 50 points in 34 games.

Van Gog played for the Netherlands at the 1980 Winter Olympics, scoring a goal and three assists in five games. He again played all games of the Netherlands at the 1981 World Ice Hockey Championships, the only time the country has appeared in Pool A or its current equivalent. Van Gog, who was known as "Elbows" in the Dutch league, is infamously remembered for having leveled Canadian superstar Guy Lafleur with a hard hit and elbow in their game with Team Canada. In Pool B in 1987, he went scoreless in two games.
