= Harrie van Heumen =

Dutch ice hockey player

- Born: 24 December 1959 (age 65); Nijmegen, NED
- Height: 5 ft 9 in (175 cm)
- Weight: 159 lb (72 kg; 11 st 5 lb)
- Position: Left wing
- Played for: Nijmegen Devils; Rotterdam Panda's; Utrecht Dragons 's-Hertogenbosch Red Eagles
- National team: Netherlands
- Playing career: 1978–1994; 2000–2001

Harrie van Heumen (born 24 December 1959) is a former ice hockey forward from the Netherlands. He participated in the 1980 Winter Olympics in Lake Placid, New York.
