= Marek Marcińczak =

Polish ice hockey player

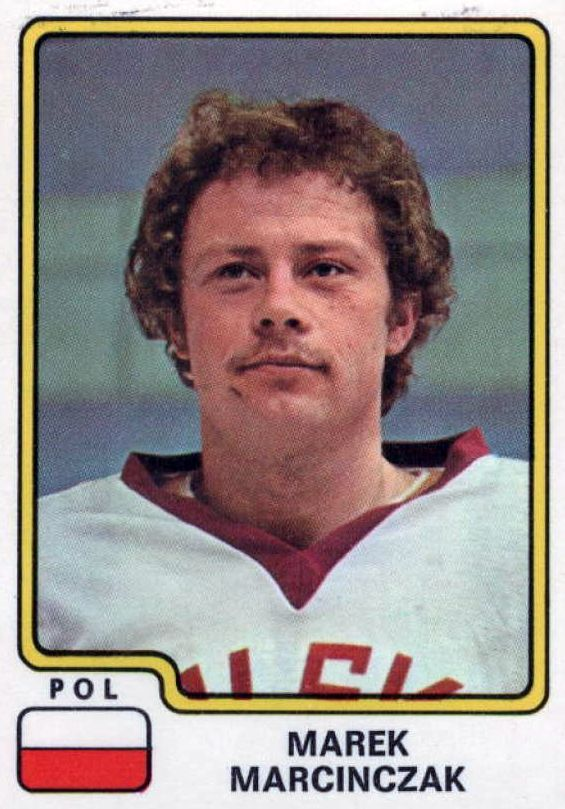
- Born: 19 January 1954 (age 72) Nowy Targ, Poland
- Height: 5 ft 10 in (178 cm)
- Weight: 168 lb (76 kg; 12 st 0 lb)
- Position: Defence
- Played for: GKS Katowice; Zaglebie Sosnowiec
- National team: Poland
- NHL draft: Undrafted

Marek Marcińczak (born 19 January 1954) is a retired Polish ice hockey player. He played for the Poland men's national ice hockey team at the 1976 Winter Olympics in Innsbruck, and the 1980 Winter Olympics in Lake Placid.
