= Larry van Wieren =

Dutch ice hockey player

- Born: May 3, 1951 (age 73); Bolsward, Netherlands
- Height: 5 ft 11 in (180 cm)
- Weight: 181 lb (82 kg; 12 st 13 lb)
- Position: Centre
- Shot: Right
- Played for: HYS The Hague; Utrecht Hunters; Heerenveen Flyers
- National team: Netherlands
- NHL draft: Undrafted
- Playing career: 1971–1985

Larry Titus van Wieren (born May 3, 1951) is a former professional ice hockey player in the Netherlands. He competed for the Dutch national team for the 1980 Winter Olympics and the 1981 World Ice Hockey Championships.

He was born in Bolsward, Netherlands, but raised near Edmonton, Alberta. A forward and shooting right-handed, van Wieren joined the Den Haag Wolves in 1971 and played three seasons. After a year away from the Netherlands, he played 1975-6 with IJshockey Club Utrecht. Van Wieren then spent the next 9 seasons with Heerenveen Flyers. He best season offensively was his first with the Flyers, 1976-7, when he scored 42 goals and 106 points in 37 games. His second best was his second last, 1983-4, when he netted 40 and collected 57 assists for 97 points in 47 games.

At the Lake Placid Olympics, van Wieren, who led the team as Captain, played all 5 games, scoring a goal and four assists. The next year saw the Netherlands compete in Pool A at the IIHF World Championships. van Wieren collected a goal and 3 assists in 8 games.
