= Henryk Janiszewski =

Polish ice hockey player

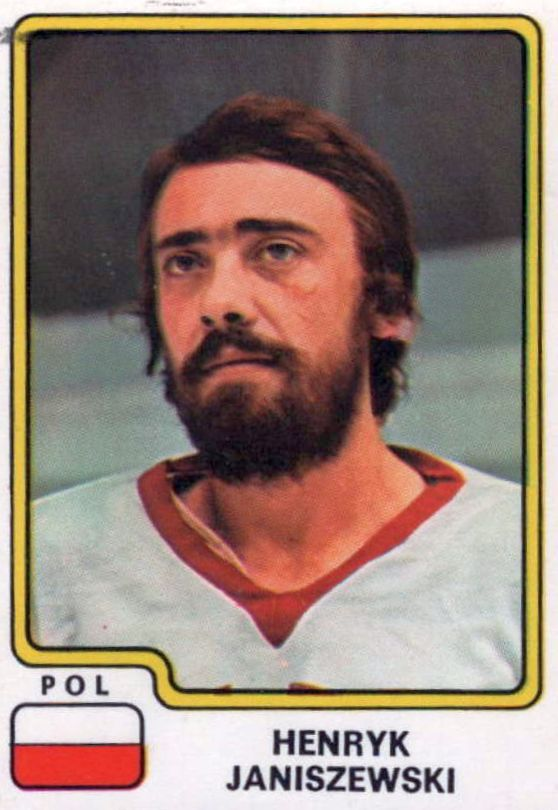
- Born: February 20, 1949 (age 76); Katowice, Poland
- Height: 5 ft 11 in (180 cm)
- Weight: 181 lb (82 kg; 12 st 13 lb)
- Position: Defence
- Played for: Naprzod Janow
- National team: Poland
- NHL draft: Undrafted
- Playing career: 1969–1987

Henryk Janiszewski (born February 20, 1949) is a former Polish ice hockey player. He played for the Poland men's national ice hockey team at 1980 Winter Olympics in Lake Placid.
