= Al Pluymers =

Dutch-Canadian ice hockey player

- Born: June 8, 1957 (age 67); Windsor, Ontario, Canada
- Height: 5 ft 11 in (180 cm)
- Weight: 203 lb (92 kg; 14 st 7 lb)
- Position: Defence
- Played for: Groningen Grizzlies
- National team: Netherlands
- NHL draft: Undrafted
- Playing career: 1977–1981

Allen "Al" Pluymers or Pluimers (born June 8, 1957) is a former Dutch-Canadian ice hockey player. He played for the Netherlands men's national ice hockey team at the 1980 Winter Olympics in Lake Placid and at the 1981 World Ice Hockey Championships.
