= Leszek Kokoszka =

Polish ice hockey player

- Born: April 11, 1951 (age 73); Nowy Targ, Poland
- Height: 5 ft 7 in (170 cm)
- Weight: 163 lb (74 kg; 11 st 9 lb)
- Position: Centre
- Played for: ŁKS Łódź
- National team: Poland
- NHL draft: Undrafted
- Playing career: 1975–1983

Leszek Kokoszka (born April 11, 1951) is a former Polish ice hockey player. He played for the Poland men's national ice hockey team at the 1976 Winter Olympics in Innsbruck, and the 1980 Winter Olympics in Lake Placid.
