= Andrzej Małysiak =

Polish ice hockey player

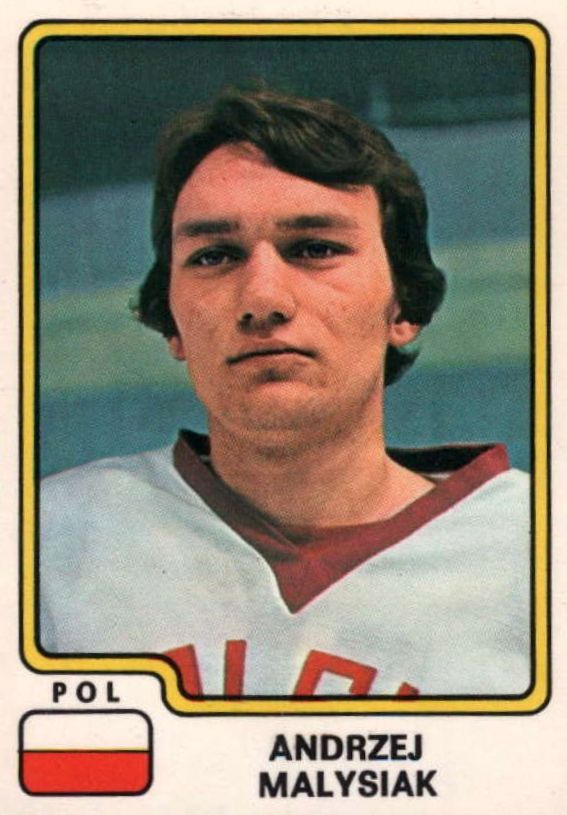
- Born: 30 June 1957 (age 67); Mysłowice, Poland
- Height: 5 ft 9 in (175 cm)
- Weight: 154 lb (70 kg; 11 st 0 lb)
- Position: Centre
- Played for: GKS Katowice; GKS Tychy
- National team: Poland
- NHL draft: Undrafted
- Playing career: 1975–1985

Andrzej Małysiak (born 30 June 1957) is a former Polish ice hockey player. He played for the Poland men's national ice hockey team at the 1980 Winter Olympics in Lake Placid. During the 1982 World Championship Group B tournament in Austria, Małysiak defected along with two other Polish players, Justyn Denisiuk and Bogusław Maj.
