= Jack de Heer =

Dutch-Canadian ice hockey player

- Born: May 17, 1953 (age 71); Lethbridge, Alberta, Canada
- Height: 5 ft 11 in (180 cm)
- Weight: 172 lb (78 kg; 12 st 4 lb)
- Position: Left wing
- Shot: Left
- Played for: Tilburg Trappers; Heerenveen Flyers; EHC Arosa
- National team: Netherlands
- NHL draft: Undrafted
- Playing career: 1971–1984

Jasper Garth Dick "Jack" de Heer (born May 17, 1953) is a former professional ice hockey player. He was a Dutch international who spent most of his career in the Eredivisie.

A Canadian of Dutch descent, de Heer spent his first five seasons in the Netherlands with Tilburg Trappers, averaging nearly four points a game. In 1976, he joined the Heerenveen Flyers where he spent the next four seasons. A regular Dutch national team member, highlights of his international career included being top scorer and name tournament top forward at the 1978 World Ice Hockey Championships Pool C, top scorer at the 1979 World Ice Hockey Championships Pool B, and scoring a hat-trick against Poland at the Lake Placid Olympics.

In 1980, de Heer joined EHC Arosa of the Swiss Nationalliga A league. In 1982, he returned to Dutch club hockey, rejoining the Flyers until retiring in 1984.

He resides in Lethbridge, Alberta, and is married with two children.
