= Andrzej Zabawa =

Polish ice hockey player

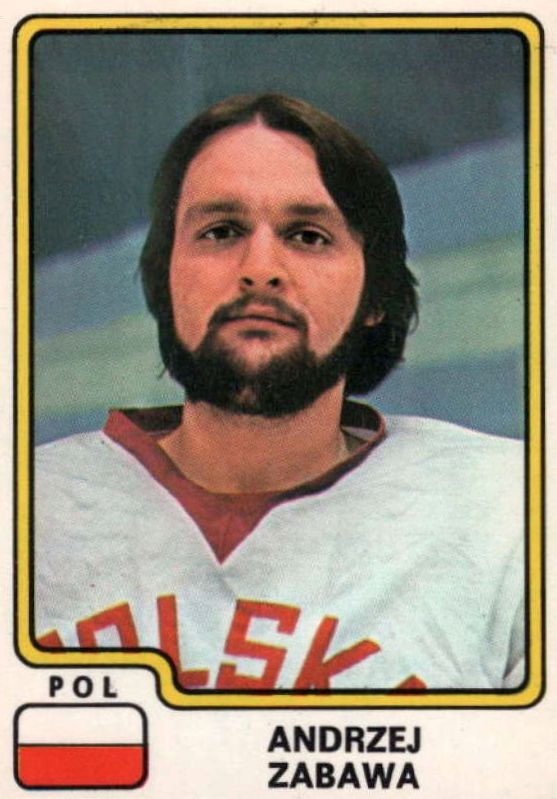
- Born: 29 November 1955 (age 70) Krynica-Zdroj, Poland
- Height: 5 ft 8 in (173 cm)
- Weight: 146 lb (66 kg; 10 st 6 lb)
- Position: Center
- Shot: Left
- Played for: Unia Oświęcim; Zaglebie Sosnowiec
- National team: Poland
- NHL draft: Undrafted
- Playing career: 1975–1991

Andrzej Tomasz Zabawa (born 29 November 1955) is a former Polish ice hockey player. He played for the Poland men's national ice hockey team at the 1976 Winter Olympics in Innsbruck, the 1980 Winter Olympics in Lake Placid, and the 1984 Winter Olympics in Sarajevo.
