= Amsterdam Tigers =

- City: Amsterdam, Netherlands
- League: First Division
- Founded: 1963
- Home arena: Jaap Edenhal (capacity: 1500)
- Colours
- Head coach: John Versteeg (2023–)
- Website: Amsterdam Tigers

Franchise history
- 2014–2017: Amstel Tijgers Amsterdam
- 2017–: Amsterdam Tigers

The Amsterdam Tigers are an ice hockey team in Amsterdam, Netherlands, playing in the First Division.

== History ==
The Tigers existed in various guises from their foundation in 1963 until 2010 when the professional team folded, leaving only the amateur and junior teams. The team reformed in time for the 2014–15 Eerste Divisie season. The following season they moved up to the newly formed BeNe League, where they remained until the 2019–20 season.

Ahead of the 2019–20 BeNe Season, the Tigers announced they would be leaving the league and joining the Dutch First Division.

Upon reformation, the team was known as Amstel Tijgers Amsterdam before changing in 2017 to its present name. The amateur and junior teams have kept the Tigers moniker.

Over the years the names of the team have included: Amsterdam Bulldogs, Boretti Tigers, Amsterdam G's and Al Capone Flames.

== Eredivisie season results ==
Note: GP = Games played, W = Wins, OTW = Overtime Wins, OTL = Overtime Losses, L = Losses, GF = Goals for, GA = Goals against, Pts = Points

Season	GP	W	OTW	OTL	L	GF	GA	Pts	Finish	Playoffs
2009–10	28	3	0	2	23	59	166	9*	7th, Eredivisie	Did not qualify
2008–09	24	8	1	5	10	85	82	31	7th, Eredivisie	Lost quarter-finals to The Hague (0–3)
2007–08	24	8	1	3	12	95	106	29	5th, Eredivisie	Did not qualify
2006–07	20	8	2	4	6	70	77	32	3rd, Eredivisie	Lost semi-finals to Tilburg (3–4)
2005–06	20	14	1	0	5	85	60	44	1st, Eredivisie	Lost semi-finals to Nijmegen(1–2)

*2 points deducted for forfeiting a game.

== Roster ==
Updated February 18, 2019.

Goaltenders
Number		Player	Catches	Acquired	Place of Birth
1	(Netherlands)	Jaimy Missler	L	2015	Amsterdam, Netherlands
32	(Netherlands)	Lars Veltman	L	2023	Zaandam, Netherlands

Defencemen
Number		Player	Shoots	Acquired	Place of Birth
3	(Czech Republic)	Tobias Mrkvicka	L	2018	Prague, Czech Republic
5	(Netherlands)	Marino Bakker	L	2015	Amsterdam, Netherlands
17	(Netherlands)	Björn Borgman	L	2016	Purmerend, Netherlands
12	(Netherlands)	Jasper Jaspers	L	2014	Amsterdam, Netherlands
41	(Netherlands)	Vince van de Kraak	L	2018	De Meern, Netherlands
22	(Canada)	James Mercer	R	2018	Vancouver, Canada
23	(Netherlands)	Stef Overweg	L	2018	De Meern, Netherlands
29	(Netherlands)	Jerry Kinneging	L	2018	Utrecht, Netherlands
37	(United States)	Michael Mackie-Kwist	R	2014	Cleveland, United States
44	(Germany)	Tobias Kathan	L	2015	Bad Tölz, Germany
63	(Netherlands)	Martijn Geerligs	L	2018	Kerkdriel, Netherlands

Forwards
Number		Player	Shoots	Position	Acquired	Place of Birth
7	(Canada)	Connor Barette	L	F	2015	LaSalle, Canada
7	(Netherlands)	Alan van Bentem (C)	L	F	2017	The Hague, Netherlands
9	(Netherlands)	Rocco van Hoorn	L	F	2015	Amsterdam, Netherlands
2	(Netherlands)	Dean Versteeg	R	F	2016	Utrecht, Netherlands
11	(Netherlands)	John Versteeg	R	RW	2014	Utrecht, Netherlands
18	(Netherlands)	Donny Pohlman	R	F	2014	Diemen, Netherlands
19	(Netherlands)	Calvin Pohlman	L	F	2014	Amsterdam, Netherlands
65	(Czech Republic)	Ivan Muso	L	F	2017	Prague, Czech Republic
24	(Finland)	Kalle Pirinen	L	F	2015	Lappeenranta, Finland
65	(Netherlands)	Maarten Brekelmans	R	F	2016	Tucson, United States
82	(Netherlands)	Zeb van Duin	L	F	2015	Amsterdam, Netherlands
62	(Netherlands)	Milo Boot	L	F	2016	Dublin, Ireland
64	(Netherlands)	Mick Vastenhouw	L	F	2014	Amsterdam, Netherlands
81	(Netherlands)	Lance van Duin	L	F	2015	Amsterdam, Netherlands

== Rivals ==
The Amstel Tijgers had a firm rivalry with the Tilburg Trappers. Usually the games between these two were tight and some hostility will be exchanged between players. Ever since the 2001–2002 season have the Amstel Tijgers been totally dominant over their rivals and been the end-station for any play-off or cup run of Tilburg. However, during the last 2006–2007 season, the Trappers finally succeeded in eliminating their rivals from the play-offs. However, the team began to perform poorly in the 2008–2009 season and were no longer contenders for the championship. After a very poor season competitively and financially, the team dropped out of the Eredivisie in 2010.

Notable player rivalries of the past were:
Trevor Sherban (Ams) vs Casey Vanschagen (Til)
Karl Dykhuis (Ams) vs Peter van Biezen (Til)
Michael Pace (Ams) vs Jeff Trembecky (Til)
Kevin Hoogsteen (Ams) vs Bjorn Willemse (Til)
David Hoogsteen (Ams) vs Bjorn Willemse (Til)

== Notable players ==
- Ron Berteling Forward
- Mark Bultje Forward
- Tjakko de Vos Defender
- Karl Dykhuis Defence
- Andre Gill Forward
- Craig Sanders Forward
- Willem van Rossum Defence

== Former coaches ==
- Willem Hoogervorst
- Mario de Vos
- Willem van Rossum.

== Silverware ==
- Dutch National Championship:

1950, 1985, 2002, 2003, 2004, 2005, 2024

- Dutch Cup:

1939, 1980, 1985, 2000, 2003, 2004, 2005

- Cup of the Low Lands:

2004, 2005, 2006.
