= 1981 Ice Hockey World Championships =

1981 edition of the World Ice Hockey Championships

Tournament details
- Host country: Sweden
- Venue: 1 (in 2 host cities)
- Dates: 12–26 April 1981
- Teams: 8

Final positions
- Champions: Soviet Union (17th title)
- Runners-up: Sweden
- Third place: Czechoslovakia
- Fourth place: Canada

Tournament statistics
- Games played: 32
- Goals scored: 288 (9 per game)
- Attendance: 171,675 (5,365 per game)
- Scoring leader: (West Germany) Holger Meitinger 20 points

The 1981 Ice Hockey World Championships took place in Sweden between 12 and 26 April 1981, with games being played in the arenas of Scandinavium in Gothenburg and Johanneshovs isstadion in Stockholm. Eight teams took part, first splitting into two groups of four, with the best two from each group advancing to the final group. These teams then play each other in the final round. This was the 47th World Championships, and also the 58th European Championships. The Soviet Union became World Champions for the 17th time, and also won their 20th European title. Don Cherry commented, "This is the best Russian team I've ever seen."

The Dutch team had won Group C and Group B in successive years to play in this tournament, but did not fare well. Their best game was a narrow one goal loss to the Americans, a goal scored on a penalty shot by Dave Christian with eleven seconds left. It was their first appearance at the top level since 1950 and they have not returned since.

== World Championship Group A (Sweden) ==
=== Group 1 ===
| Pos | Team | Pld | W | D | L | GF | GA | GD | Pts |
|---|---|---|---|---|---|---|---|---|---|
| 1 | Soviet Union | 3 | 3 | 0 | 0 | 25 | 4 | +21 | 6 |
| 2 | Canada | 3 | 2 | 0 | 1 | 14 | 12 | +2 | 4 |
| 3 | Finland | 3 | 1 | 0 | 2 | 16 | 14 | +2 | 2 |
| 4 | Netherlands | 3 | 0 | 0 | 3 | 5 | 30 | −25 | 0 |

| 12 April | Canada | 4–3 | Finland |

| 12 April | Soviet Union | 10–1 | Netherlands |

| 13 April | Canada | 8–1 | Netherlands |

| 13 April | Soviet Union | 7–1 | Finland |

| 15 April | Soviet Union | 8–2 | Canada |

| 15 April | Finland | 12–3 | Netherlands |

=== Group 2 ===
| Pos | Team | Pld | W | D | L | GF | GA | GD | Pts |
|---|---|---|---|---|---|---|---|---|---|
| 1 | Czechoslovakia | 3 | 2 | 1 | 0 | 20 | 7 | +13 | 5 |
| 2 | Sweden | 3 | 2 | 1 | 0 | 11 | 7 | +4 | 5 |
| 3 | United States | 3 | 1 | 0 | 2 | 14 | 21 | −7 | 2 |
| 4 | West Germany | 3 | 0 | 0 | 3 | 10 | 20 | −10 | 0 |

| 12 April | Czechoslovakia | 11–2 | United States |

| 12 April | Sweden | 4–2 | West Germany |

| 14 April | Sweden | 4–2 | United States |

| 14 April | Czechoslovakia | 6–2 | West Germany |

| 15 April | Czechoslovakia | 3–3 | Sweden |

| 15 April | United States | 10–6 | West Germany |

=== Final round ===
| Pos | Team | Pld | W | D | L | GF | GA | GD | Pts |
|---|---|---|---|---|---|---|---|---|---|
| 1 | Soviet Union | 6 | 4 | 2 | 0 | 38 | 12 | +26 | 10 |
| 2 | Sweden | 6 | 3 | 1 | 2 | 16 | 26 | −10 | 7 |
| 3 | Czechoslovakia | 6 | 2 | 2 | 2 | 20 | 22 | −2 | 6 |
| 4 | Canada | 6 | 0 | 1 | 5 | 16 | 30 | −14 | 1 |

| 18 April | Czechoslovakia | 7–4 | Canada |

| 18 April | Soviet Union | 4–1 | Sweden |

| 20 April | Sweden | 3–1 | Canada |

| 20 April | Soviet Union | 8–3 | Czechoslovakia |

| 22 April | Canada | 4–4 | Soviet Union |

| 22 April | Sweden | 4–2 | Czechoslovakia |

| 24 April | Czechoslovakia | 4–2 | Canada |

| 24 April | Soviet Union | 13–1 | Sweden |

| 26 April | Sweden | 4–3 | Canada |

| 26 April | Soviet Union | 1–1 | Czechoslovakia |

=== Consolation round ===
| Pos | Team | Pld | W | D | L | GF | GA | GD | Pts |
|---|---|---|---|---|---|---|---|---|---|
| 5 | United States | 6 | 4 | 1 | 1 | 35 | 28 | +7 | 9 |
| 6 | Finland | 6 | 3 | 2 | 1 | 33 | 21 | +12 | 8 |
| 7 | West Germany | 6 | 3 | 1 | 2 | 40 | 30 | +10 | 7 |
| 8 | Netherlands | 6 | 0 | 0 | 6 | 22 | 51 | −29 | 0 |

Note: one game from previous round carried forward
The Netherlands were relegated to Group B.

| 17 April | United States | 7–6 | Netherlands |

| 17 April | Finland | 6–3 | West Germany |

| 19 April | West Germany | 9–2 | Netherlands |

| 19 April | United States | 6–4 | Finland |

| 21 April | West Germany | 6–2 | United States |

| 21 April | Finland | 4–2 | Netherlands |

| 23 April | United States | 7–3 | Netherlands |

| 23 April | West Germany | 4–4 | Finland |

| 25 April | West Germany | 12–6 | Netherlands |

| 25 April | Finland | 3–3 | United States |

== World Championship Group B (Italy) ==
Played in Urtijëi 20–29 March. The hosts went undefeated to win, led by former Pittsburgh Penguin and Edmonton Oiler Wayne Bianchin and backstopped by former Oiler Jim Corsi.

| Pos | Team | Pld | W | D | L | GF | GA | GD | Pts |
|---|---|---|---|---|---|---|---|---|---|
| 9 | Italy | 7 | 6 | 1 | 0 | 38 | 18 | +20 | 13 |
| 10 | Poland | 7 | 5 | 1 | 1 | 49 | 25 | +24 | 11 |
| 11 | Switzerland | 7 | 4 | 2 | 1 | 28 | 20 | +8 | 10 |
| 12 | East Germany | 7 | 4 | 1 | 2 | 37 | 25 | +12 | 9 |
| 13 | Romania | 7 | 2 | 0 | 5 | 25 | 30 | −5 | 4 |
| 14 | Norway | 7 | 2 | 0 | 5 | 21 | 39 | −18 | 4 |
| 15 | Yugoslavia | 7 | 1 | 1 | 5 | 23 | 44 | −21 | 3 |
| 16 | Japan | 7 | 1 | 0 | 6 | 18 | 38 | −20 | 2 |

Italy was promoted to Group A, both Yugoslavia and Japan were relegated to Group C.

| 20 March | East Germany | 4–3 | Japan |

| 20 March | Romania | 5–6 | Poland |

| 20 March | Switzerland | 5–2 | Norway |

| 20 March | Italy | 6–4 | Yugoslavia |

| 21 March | Switzerland | 3–3 | Poland |

| 21 March | Japan | 0–2 | Norway |

| 21 March | East Germany | 11–3 | Yugoslavia |

| 21 March | Italy | 3–2 | Romania |

| 23 March | Romania | 1–6 | East Germany |

| 23 March | Poland | 13–4 | Norway |

| 23 March | Japan | 7–3 | Yugoslavia |

| 23 March | Italy | 4–2 | Switzerland |

| 24 March | Japan | 2–11 | Poland |

| 24 March | Yugoslavia | 3–2 | Romania |

| 24 March | Italy | 6–1 | Norway |

| 24 March | Switzerland | 2–1 | East Germany |

| 26 March | Yugoslavia | 4–4 | Switzerland |

| 26 March | Romania | 5–1 | Japan |

| 26 March | East Germany | 6–3 | Norway |

| 26 March | Italy | 4–1 | Poland |

| 28 March | Norway | 6–2 | Yugoslavia |

| 28 March | Switzerland | 8–3 | Romania |

| 28 March | East Germany | 3–7 | Poland |

| 28 March | Italy | 9–2 | Japan |

| 29 March | Yugoslavia | 4–8 | Poland |

| 29 March | Norway | 3–7 | Romania |

| 29 March | Switzerland | 4–3 | Japan |

| 29 March | Italy | 6–6 | East Germany |

== World Championship Group C (China PR) ==
Played in Beijing 6–15 March.

| Pos | Team | Pld | W | D | L | GF | GA | GD | Pts |
|---|---|---|---|---|---|---|---|---|---|
| 17 | Austria | 7 | 7 | 0 | 0 | 43 | 5 | +38 | 14 |
| 18 | China | 7 | 6 | 0 | 1 | 46 | 14 | +32 | 12 |
| 19 | Hungary | 7 | 4 | 1 | 2 | 38 | 22 | +16 | 9 |
| 20 | Denmark | 7 | 3 | 1 | 3 | 36 | 27 | +9 | 7 |
| 21 | France | 7 | 3 | 0 | 4 | 48 | 36 | +12 | 6 |
| 22 | Bulgaria | 7 | 3 | 0 | 4 | 22 | 32 | −10 | 6 |
| 23 | North Korea | 7 | 1 | 0 | 6 | 18 | 66 | −48 | 2 |
| 24 | Great Britain | 7 | 0 | 0 | 7 | 11 | 60 | −49 | 0 |

Both Austria and China were promoted to Group B.

| 6 March | Austria | 10–0 | North Korea |

| 6 March | Hungary | 8–0 | Great Britain |

| 6 March | France | 7–0 | Bulgaria |

| 6 March | China | 5–1 | Denmark |

| 7 March | Great Britain | 2–11 | France |

| 7 March | China | 6–2 | Bulgaria |

| 7 March | North Korea | 5–9 | Denmark |

| 7 March | Austria | 7–0 | Hungary |

| 9 March | Hungary | 10–3 | North Korea |

| 9 March | Denmark | 4–6 | Bulgaria |

| 9 March | France | 1–7 | Austria |

| 9 March | China | 12–2 | Great Britain |

| 10 March | Hungary | 11–6 | France |

| 10 March | North Korea | 2–9 | Bulgaria |

| 10 March | Great Britain | 2–13 | Denmark |

| 10 March | China | 0–3 | Austria |

| 12 March | Bulgaria | 4–2 | Great Britain |

| 12 March | France | 17–1 | North Korea |

| 12 March | Austria | 4–2 | Denmark |

| 12 March | China | 3–1 | Hungary |

| 13 March | China | 10–3 | France |

| 13 March | Great Britain | 1–5 | North Korea |

| 13 March | Hungary | 2–2 | Denmark |

| 13 March | Austria | 5–0 | Bulgaria |

| 15 March | Austria | 7–2 | Great Britain |

| 15 March | Bulgaria | 1–6 | Hungary |

| 15 March | France | 3–5 | Denmark |

| 15 March | China | 10–2 | North Korea |

== Ranking and statistics ==
1981 IIHF World Championship winners

Soviet Union
17th title

=== Tournament Awards ===
- Best players selected by the directorate:
  - Best Goaltender: (Sweden) Peter Lindmark
  - Best Defenceman: (Canada) Larry Robinson
  - Best Forward: (Soviet Union) Alexander Maltsev
- Media All-Star Team:
  - Goaltender: (Sweden) Peter Lindmark
  - Defence: (Canada) Larry Robinson, (Soviet Union) Valeri Vasiliev
  - Forwards: (Soviet Union) Sergei Kapustin, (Soviet Union) Sergei Makarov, (Soviet Union) Alexander Maltsev

=== Final standings ===
The final standings of the tournament according to IIHF:

| 1st place, gold medalist(s) | Soviet Union |
| 2nd place, silver medalist(s) | Sweden |
| 3rd place, bronze medalist(s) | Czechoslovakia |
| 4 | Canada |
| 5 | United States |
| 6 | Finland |
| 7 | West Germany |
| 8 | Netherlands |

=== European championships final standings ===
The final standings of the European championships according to IIHF:

| Gold medal | Soviet Union |
| Silver medal | Sweden |
| Bronze medal | Czechoslovakia |
| 4 | Finland |
| 5 | West Germany |
| 6 | Netherlands |

== Fanfare of the Championships ==
The fanfare for the Championships was written by Benny Andersson (from ABBA) in 1981. It was later used as the jingle/opening theme for the television special Dick Cavett Meets ABBA aired later in 1981. Reference - Palm, Carl Magnus: ABBA - The Complete Recordings Sessions, page 106. Verulam Publishing Ltd (13 October 1994). ISBN 0-907938-10-8. ISBN 978-0-907938-10-1.
