= Netherlands men's national ice hockey team =

Netherlands
- Nickname: Oranje (Orange)
- Association: Netherlands Ice Hockey Association
- General manager: Robin de Vroede
- Head coach: Doug Mason
- Assistants: Michael Nason
- Captain: Danny Stempher
- Most games: Ron Berteling (213)
- Top scorer: Jack de Heer (114)
- Most points: Jack de Heer (210)
- Team colors
- IIHF code: NED

Ranking
- Current IIHF: 28 (3 June 2026)
- Highest IIHF: 23 (2004–06)
- Lowest IIHF: 29 (2022–24)

First international
- Belgium 4–0 Netherlands (Amsterdam, Netherlands; 5 January 1935)

Biggest win
- Netherlands 23–1 Thailand (Tilburg, Netherlands; 16 December 2023)

Biggest defeat
- Denmark 23–1 Netherlands (Odense, Denmark; 1 September 2001)

Olympics
- Appearances: 1 (first in 1980)

IIHF World Championships
- Appearances: 55 (first in 1935)
- Best result: 7th (1953)

International record (W–L–T)
- 259–413–58

The Netherlands men's national ice hockey team is the national men's ice hockey of the Netherlands.

The Netherlands are currently ranked 28th in the IIHF World Ranking and compete in IIHF World Championship Division II.

== History ==
The Netherlands competed in the 1980 Olympic ice hockey competition. They then competed in Pool A of the 1981 World Ice Hockey Championships.

In the 1980 Winter Olympics, The Netherlands, competed in the Red division group, and had a record of 1–3–1. They lost to Canada (10–1), they lost to the Soviet Union (17–4), they tied Japan (3–3), they beat Poland (5–3), and they lost to Finland (10–3).

One year later, the team returned to the top division in the 1981 World Ice Hockey Championships. In the first round, the team lost all of their games, followed by another 3 losses in the final round.

== Tournament record ==
=== Olympic Games ===
- 1980 – 9th place

=== World Championship ===
- 1935 – 14th place
- 1939 – 11th place
- 1950 – 8th place
- 1951 – 10th place (3rd in Pool B)
- 1952 – 13th place (4th in Pool B)
- 1953 – 7th place (4th in Pool B)
- 1955 – 12th place (3rd in Pool B)
- 1961 – 18th place (4th in Pool C)
- 1963 – 20th place (5th in Pool C)
- 1967 – 21st place (5th in Pool C)
- 1969 – 18th place (4th in Pool C)
- 1970 – 20th place (6th in Pool C)
- 1971 – 21st place (7th in Pool C)
- 1972 – 20th place (7th in Pool C)
- 1973 – 16th place (2nd in Pool C)
- 1974 – 11th place (5th in Pool B)
- 1975 – 14th place (8th in Pool B)
- 1976 – 14th place (6th in Pool B)
- 1977 – 16th place (8th in Pool B)
- 1978 – 17th place (1st in Pool C)
- 1979 – 9th place (1st in Pool B)
- 1981 – 8th place
- 1982 – 16th place (8th in Pool B)
- 1983 – 17th place (1st in Pool C)
- 1985 – 14th place (6th in Pool B)
- 1986 – 13th place (5th in Pool B)
- 1987 – 15th place (7th in Pool B)
- 1989 – 17th place (1st in Pool C)
- 1990 – 16th place (8th in Pool B)
- 1991 – 15th place (7th in Pool B)
- 1992 – 13th place (2nd in Pool B)
- 1993 – 15th place (3rd in Pool B)
- 1994 – 18th place (6th in Pool B)
- 1995 – 16th place (4th in Pool B)
- 1996 – 19th place (7th in Pool B)
- 1997 – 19th place (7th in Pool B)
- 1998 – 24th place (8th in Pool B)
- 1999 – 25th place (1st in Pool C)
- 2000 – 24th place (8th in Pool B)
- 2001 – 25th place (5th in Division I, Group A)
- 2002 – 24th place (4th in Division I, Group A)
- 2003 – 23rd place (4th in Division I, Group A)
- 2004 – 22nd place (3rd in Division I, Group A)
- 2005 – 22nd place (3rd in Division I, Group B)
- 2006 – 25th place (5th in Division I, Group B)
- 2007 – 25th place (5th in Division I, Group A)
- 2008 – 26th place (5th in Division I, Group A)
- 2009 – 25th place (5th in Division I, Group B)
- 2010 – 24th place (4th in Division I, Group A)
- 2011 – 24th place (4th in Division I, Group A)
- 2012 – 25th place (3rd in Division I, Group B)
- 2013 – 25th place (3rd in Division I, Group B)
- 2014 – 27th place (5th in Division I, Group B)
- 2015 – 28th place (6th in Division I, Group B)
- 2016 – 29th place (1st in Division II, Group A)
- 2017 – 28th place (6th in Division I, Group B)
- 2018 – 29th place (1st in Division II, Group A)
- 2019 – 28th place (6th in Division I, Group B)
- 2020 – Cancelled due to the COVID-19 pandemic
- 2021 – Cancelled due to the COVID-19 pandemic
- 2022 – 28th place (2nd in Division II, Group A)
- 2023 – 27th place (5th in Division I, Group B)
- 2024 – 28th place (6th in Division I, Group B)
- 2025 – 29th place (1st in Division II, Group A)
- 2026 – 28th place (6th in Division I, Group B)
- 2027 – (Division I, Group B)

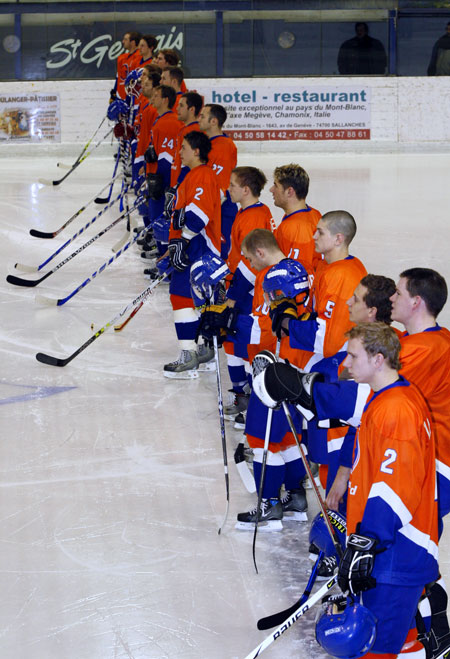
The Netherlands national team in 2007.

== Team ==
=== Current roster ===
Roster for the 2026 IIHF World Championship Division I.

Head coach: (Canada) Doug Mason

No.	Pos.	Name
1	G	Ruud Leeuwesteijn
5	F	Donny van Belkom
6	D	Björn Borgman
8	F	Raymond van der Schuit
9	F	Wouter Sars
11	F	Marvin Timmer
12	D	Frits Doop
13	D	Jordy Verkiel
14	D	Wesley de Bruijn
15	F	Jay de Ruiter
17	F	Jaidy van Mourik
18	F	Olaf Schoningh
19	F	Danny Stempher
21	F	Tom Speel
22	F	Lennart Vosmer
23	D	Kyan Helenklaken
24	D	Justin van Baarsen
25	D	Viktor Nordemann
26	F	Bartek Bison
27	F	Rens Aberson
28	F	Floris Vooren
29	G	Cedrick Andree
30	G	Martijn Oosterwijk

== All-time record ==
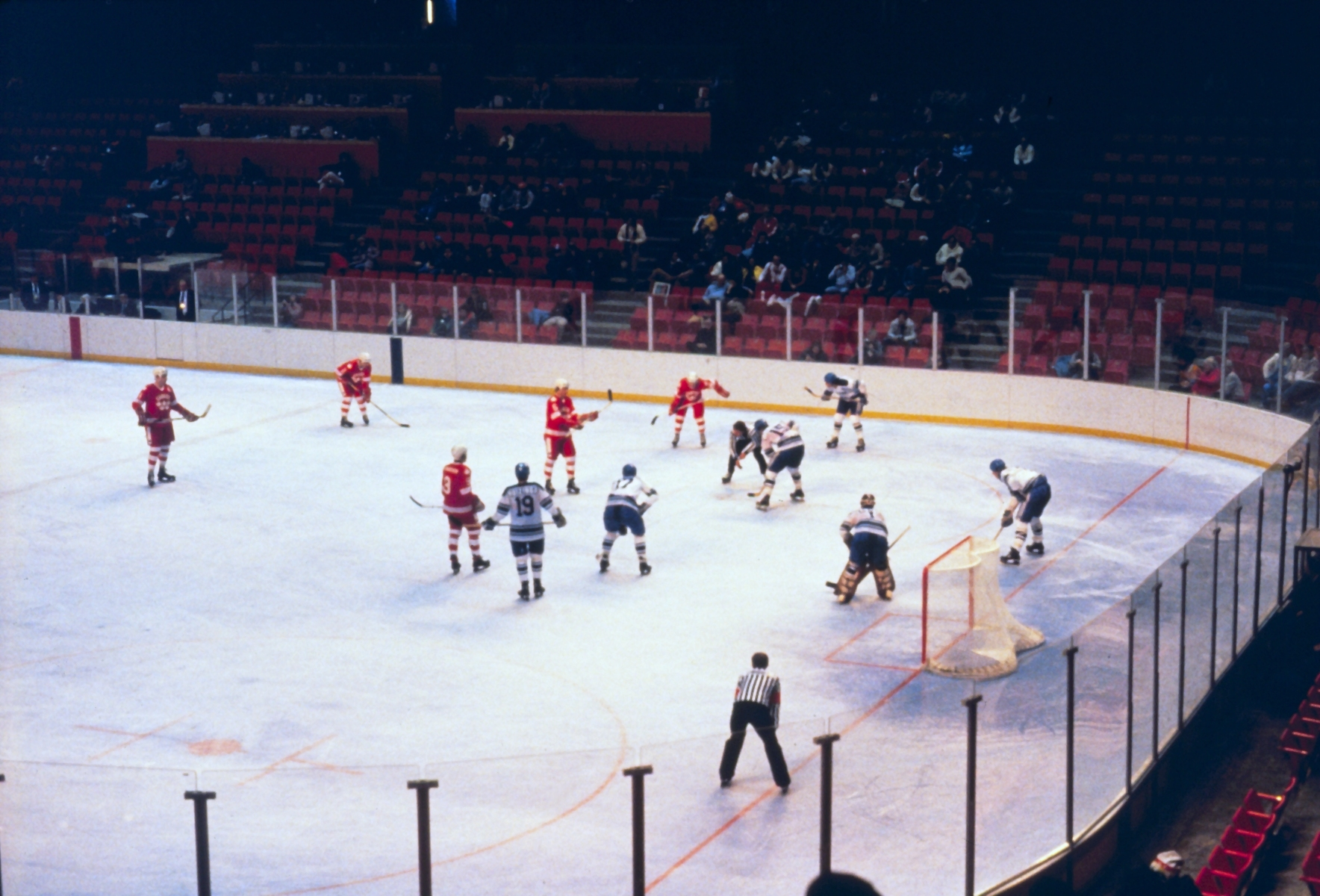
The Netherlands and Canada during the 1980 Winter Olympics, the only Olympics the Netherlands has participated in. Canada won the match 10–1.

As of 28 September 2026.

Opponent	Played	Won	Drawn	Lost	GF	GA	GD
Australia	6	6	0	0	49	11	+38
Austria	37	7	4	26	89	198	−109
Belarus	4	0	0	4	10	35	−25
Belgium	73	51	3	19	463	211	+252
Bulgaria	17	13	1	3	110	52	+58
Canada	3	0	0	3	2	26	−24
China	22	17	0	5	154	56	+98
Chinese Taipei	1	1	0	0	14	1	+13
Croatia	17	14	1	2	86	36	+50
Denmark	55	17	7	31	185	242	−57
East Germany	20	2	5	13	55	105	−50
Estonia	15	2	1	12	36	65	−29
Finland	4	1	0	3	10	27	−17
France	43	13	4	26	159	222	−63
Georgia	1	1	0	0	8	2	+6
Germany	11	0	1	10	23	79	−56
Great Britain	30	7	1	22	99	155	−56
Hungary	31	10	3	18	101	170	−69
Iceland	3	3	0	0	18	2	+16
Israel	2	2	0	0	13	2	+11
Italy	32	4	3	25	68	155	−87
Japan	32	9	4	19	94	170	−76
Kazakhstan	8	0	0	8	17	45	−28
Latvia	6	0	0	6	6	45	−39
Lithuania	17	7	5	5	56	47	+9
Mexico	1	1	0	0	17	1	+16
North Korea	3	3	0	0	25	2	+23
Norway	42	11	6	25	130	200	−70
Poland	40	3	2	35	85	209	−124
Romania	30	14	2	14	93	120	−27
Serbia	6	5	0	1	23	11	+12
Slovakia	2	0	0	2	4	24	−20
Slovenia	16	2	3	11	36	90	−54
South Africa	1	1	0	0	8	4	+4
South Korea	10	6	0	4	50	43	+7
Soviet Union	14	0	0	14	27	172	−145
Spain	11	7	0	4	65	26	+39
Sweden	3	0	0	3	0	23	−23
Switzerland	19	3	1	15	42	119	−77
Thailand	1	1	0	0	23	1	+22
Ukraine	13	0	0	13	17	81	−64
United Arab Emirates	1	1	0	0	5	0	+5
United States	6	0	0	6	19	58	−39
Yugoslavia	22	11	3	8	98	84	+14
Total	726	225	60	441	2 687	3 401	−714
