= Esko =

Esko is a Finnish masculine given name and surname.

== Given name ==
People with the given name include:

- Esko Aho (born 1954), former Prime Minister of Finland
- Esko Ahonen (1955–2025), Finnish politician
- Esko Almgren (born 1932), Finnish politician
- Esko Elstelä (1931–2007), Finnish screenwriter and film director
- Esko Hamilo (born 1945), Finnish diplomat
- Esko Hillebrandt (born 1962), Finnish rower
- Esko Järvinen (1907–1976), Finnish skier
- Esko Jussila (born 1934), Finnish skier
- Esko Kaonpää (1942–2002), Finnish ice hockey player
- Esko Karhunen (1928–2016), Finnish basketball player
- Esko Karu (1946–2003), Canadian skier
- Esko Kiviranta (born 1950), Finnish politician
- Esko Kovero (born 1958), Finnish actor
- Esko Kunnamo (1929–2014), Finnish diplomat
- Esko Laine (born 1961), Finnish double-bassist and educator
- Esko Lähtevänoja (born 1953), Finnish skier
- Esko Luostarinen (born 1935), Finnish ice hockey player
- Esko Lyytikkä (1929–1997), Finnish rower
- Esko Malm (born 1940), Finnish footballer
- Esko Marttinen (born 1938), Finnish biathlete
- Esko Mikkola (born 1975), Finnish javelin thrower
- Esko Nevalainen (1925–2008), Finnish cinematographer
- Esko Niemi (1934–2013), Finnish ice hockey player
- Esko Nikkari (1938–2006), Finnish actor
- Esko Niskanen (1928–2013), Finnish politician
- Esko Rajakoski (1934–2002), Finnish diplomat
- Esko Ranta (born 1947), Finnish footballer
- Esko Rautionaho (born 1950), Finnish ski jumper
- Esko Rechardt (born 1958), Finnish sport sailor
- Esko Rekomaa (1932–1985), Finnish ice hockey player
- Esko Saira (born 1938), Finnish biathlete
- Esko Salminen (born 1940), Finnish actor
- Esko Salminen (field hockey) (1920–1998), Finnish field hockey player
- Esko Seppänen (1946–2025), Finnish politician
- Esko Silvennoinen (1931–2020), Finnish field hockey player
- Esko Tie (1928–2002), Finnish ice hockey player
- Esko Tommola (1930–2008), Finnish newsreader
- Esko Töyri (1915–1992), Finnish cinematographer and film director
- Esko Ukkonen (born 1950), Finnish computer scientist
- Esko Vaartela (1927–1983), Finnish diplomat
- Esko Valkama (1924–2007), Finnish footballer
- Esko Valtaoja (born 1951), Finnish astronomer and writer

== Surname ==
People with the surname include:

- Edward Esko (1950–2021), American macrobiotic diet advocate
- Jeffrey Esko, American biochemist
- Mikko Esko (born 1978), Finnish volleyball player
