= Kimmo Leinonen =

Finnish ice hockey executive and writer (born 1949)

- Born: 30 August 1949 (age 76); Tampere, Finland
- Occupations: Public relations; sports marketing; writer
- Known for: Ilves; Finnish Hockey Hall of Fame; SM-liiga; International Ice Hockey Federation; Finnish Ice Hockey Association
- Awards: Paul Loicq Award (2023)

Kimmo Leinonen (born 30 August 1949) is a Finnish ice hockey executive and writer. He was the director of public relations and marketing for the International Ice Hockey Federation (IIHF) from 1995 to 2007, and held similar positions for SM-liiga and Ilves. He served as general secretary of the 2012 and 2013 Ice Hockey World Championships co-hosted in Finland and Sweden. He also coached junior ice hockey for Ilves, managed the Ilves Naiset who won three Naisten SM-sarja championships, was a scout for the New York Rangers, and a sports commentator for hockey broadcasts in Finland.

Leinonen was a founding member of the Finnish Hockey Hall of Fame in 1979, and helped establish the IIHF Hall of Fame in 1996. He served as chairman of the Finnish Hockey Hall of Fame from 2011 to 2018, and has written multiple books on the history of hockey in Finland. He was inducted into the builder category of the Finnish Hockey Hall of Fame in 2011, and was named the 2023 recipient of the Paul Loicq Award from the IIHF.

== Early life ==
Kimmo Leinonen was born 30 August 1949, in Tampere, Finland. He became interested in ice hockey as a youth after his older brother took him to watch Ilves play, and when the team's captain Pentti Isotalo was his elementary school teacher in grade three.

== Ice hockey career ==
=== Beginnings in Finland ===
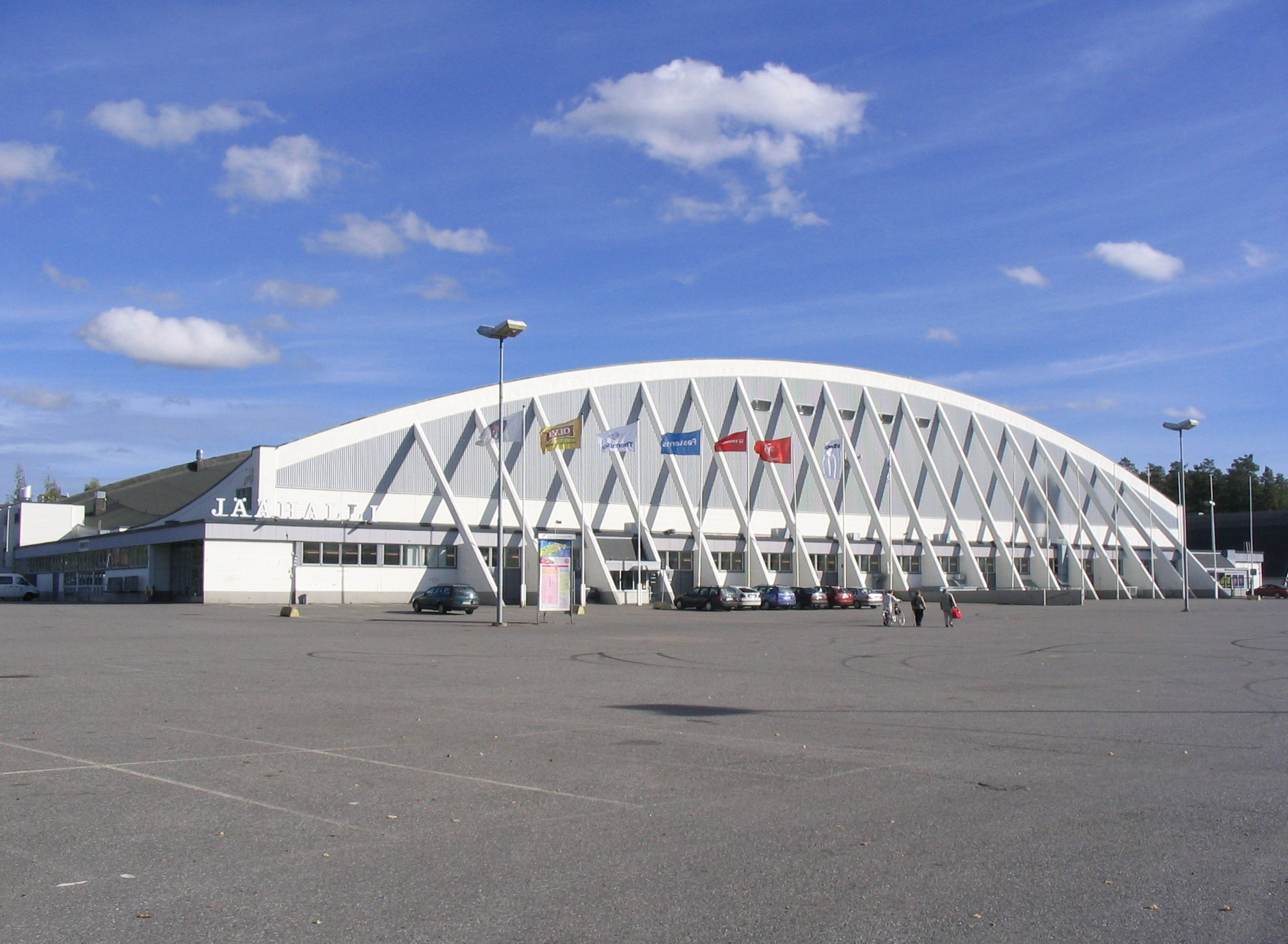
Tampere Ice Stadium

Leinonen began his hockey career in the mid-1970s as the junior ice hockey coach for Ilves, and the club's marketing manager. When the Finnish Hockey Hall of Fame was established on 14 June 1979, Leinonen was one of its six founding members. Its museum first opened at the Tampere Ice Stadium in December 1979.

Leinonen was a scout for the New York Rangers from 1978–79 to 1982–83, and worked in the ice hockey stick industry in Germany and Canada at the same time. He was the marketing manager for SM-liiga from 1984 to 1988, after which he was a sports commentator for hockey broadcasts in Finland. He also served as manager of the Ilves women's team from 1990–91 to 1993–94, who were Naisten SM-sarja champions in 1991, 1992 and 1993.

=== International Ice Hockey Federation ===
Leinonen served as the director of public relations and marketing for the International Ice Hockey Federation (IIHF) from 1995 to 2007. After assuming the role, he collaborated with IIHF vice-president Walter Bush to establish the IIHF Hall of Fame in 1996.

Leinonen served as secretary of the IIHF marketing committee and the IIHF Hall of Fame committee from 1998 to 2003, and was the editor-in-chief of the media guide for ice hockey at the Winter Olympic Games. He was also a technical delegate to four Olympic Games and 14 Ice Hockey World Championships from 1998 to 2010, and served as chairman of more than 40 IIHF men's and women's events from 1995 to 2022.

=== Return to Finland ===
Leinonen served as general secretary of the 2012 IIHF World Championship and 2013 IIHF World Championship, which were co-hosted by Finland and Sweden. He joined the Finnish Ice Hockey Association in August 2007, to begin work on the events. Finland had last hosted the World Championship in 2003, and naming Leinonen to oversee the event "gave Finland credibility as a candidate country", according to IIHF vice-president Kalervo Kummola.

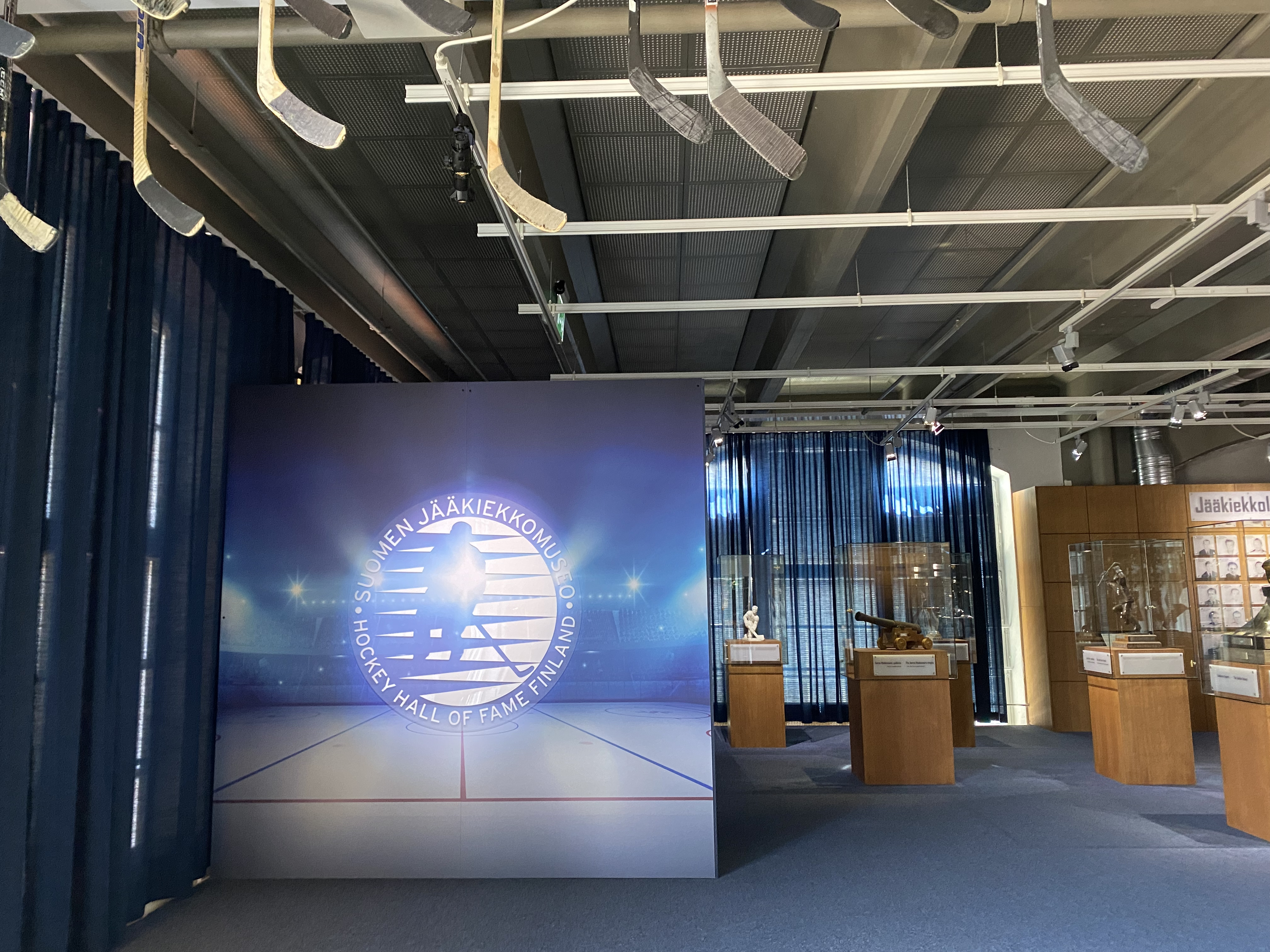
Finnish Hockey Hall of Fame entrance

Leinonen served as chairman of the Finnish Hockey Hall of Fame from 2011 to 2018. After the exhibits moved into their new home at the Vapriikki Museum Centre in the early-2000s, Leinonen remarked that the hall of fame had evolved into "a place where you can also experiment and participate for yourself, not just watch". By the end of his tenure, the number of visitors had increased to 200,000 people per year.

== Writing career ==
In retirement, Leinonen focused on writing books on the history of Finnish hockey.

List of publications:

- Jääkiekon maailma (2012, 2013; Hockey World: Lion Trail)
- Koulukadun sankarit: Tampereen jääkiekkoilun historia 1928–1965 (2014; Heroes of Koulukatu: The history of ice hockey in Tampere 1928–1965)
- Jääkiekkoleijonat (2015, 2022; Hockey Lions)
- Ensimmäiset Suomessa: Hakametsän jäähalli ja jääkiekon MM-kisat 1965 (2015; First in Finland: Hakametsä ice rink and Ice Hockey World Championships 1965)
- Leijonat kultajahdissa (2016; Lions in a gold hunt)
- Jääkiekon ennätyskirja (2016; Ice hockey record book)
- Jääkiekon legendat keräilykortteina (2017; Hockey legends as collectible cards)
- Suuri jääkiekkokirja (2018; Great hockey book)
- Koko kansan leijonat: Suomi-kiekon historia (2018; Lions of the whole nation: The history of the Suomi-puck)

== Personal life ==
Leinonen once had partial ownership in a racehorse, and has a daughter who was involved in hockey. He was a lifelong friend of hockey player Aarne Honkavaara.

In 2017, Leinonen pleaded guilty to tax fraud and was sentenced to six months and 15 days suspended imprisonment. He failed to pay €112,000 in taxes on a property he sold in Switzerland, where he had lived while working for the IIHF.

== Honors and awards ==
Leinonen is an honorary lifetime member of Ilves, and was inducted into the builder category of the Finnish Hockey Hall of Fame in 2011, as Lion number 211.

The IIHF named Leinonen the recipient of the Paul Loicq Award for 2023, in recognition of contributions to international ice hockey. The award was given during the IIHF Hall of Fame induction ceremony, prior to the medal games of the 2023 IIHF World Championship in Tampere. Leinonen was the first person from Finland to receive the award. In receiving the award, Leinonen urged more IIHF members to preserve their hockey history, noting that only 20 countries had established a hockey hall of fame.
