= Matti Karumaa =

Finnish ice hockey player

Matti Antero Karumaa (25 November 1924 in Hämeenlinna, Finland - 31 May 1993) was a Finnish ice hockey player who played in the SM-liiga. He played for Hämeenlinnan Tarmo between 1942 and 1952. He formed powerful line called "Ka-Ku-Ti" with Keijo Kuusela and Esko Tie. Karumaa won two Finnish championships in Tarmo. Internationally he played for the Finnish national team at the 1952 Winter Olympics.

Matti Karumaa's older brother Pentti Karumaa, also played ice hockey in Tarmo. He played 68 matches in his career between 1944 and 1954.

Karumaa was inducted into the Finnish Hockey Hall of Fame in 1985.
