= Valkeapää =

Valkeapää is a Finnish surname. Notable people with the surname include:

- Nils-Aslak Valkeapää (1943–2001), Finnish writer, musician, and artist
- Pertti Valkeapää (born 1951), Finnish ice hockey player
