= Harry Bogomoloff =

Finnish politician

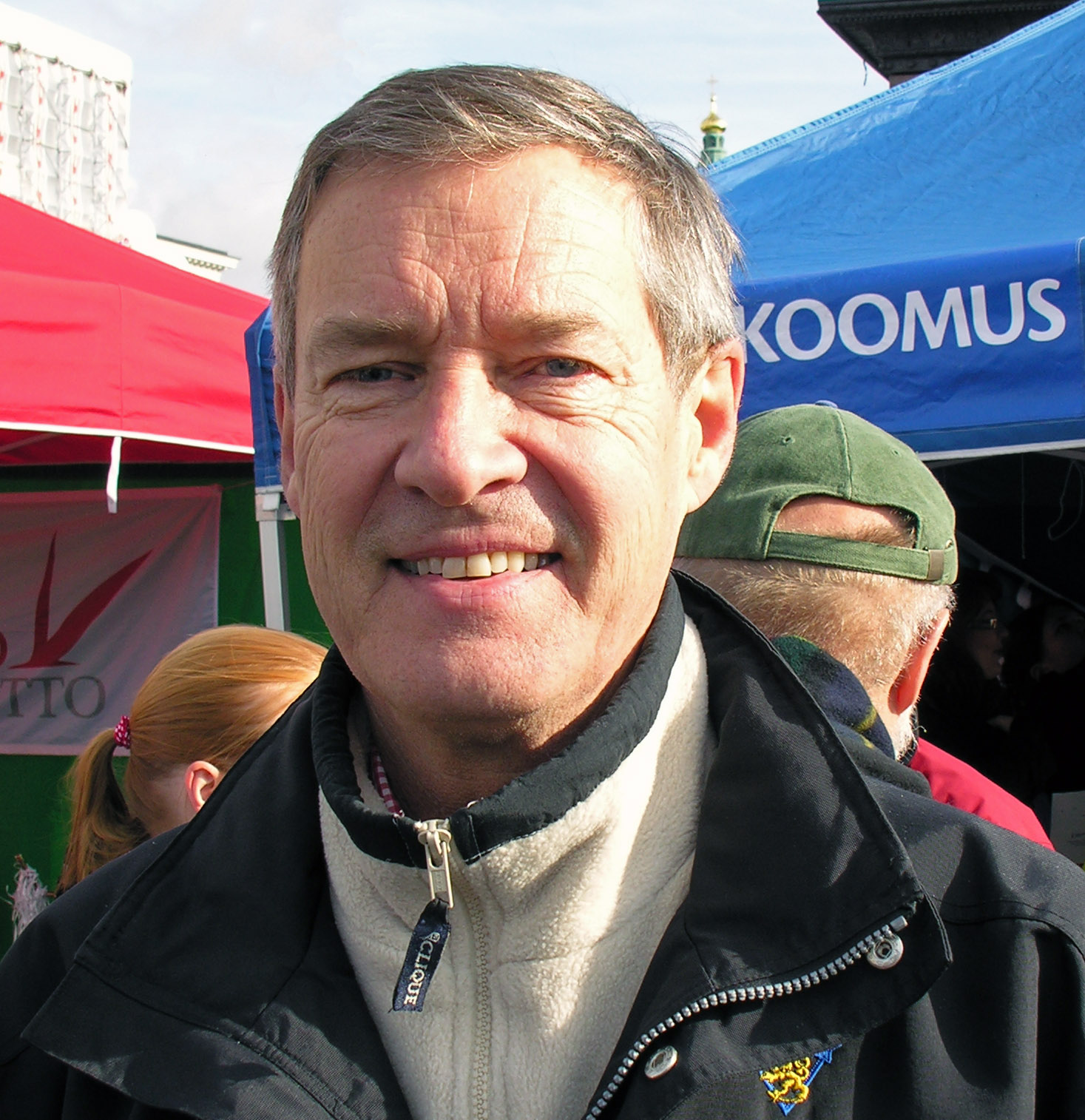
Bogomoloff in 2008

Harry "Bogo" Bogomoloff (born June 10, 1944, in Helsinki, Finland) is a Finnish politician, sports influencer and an ice hockey referee. He has a MSc degree in political sciences.

Bogomoloff has been a member of the City Council of Helsinki since 1985. For two years, he served as the chairman of the municipal board and for eight years as the chairman of the council group of the National Coalition Party. He has served as the first vice chairman of the council since 2005.

During his lifetime, Bogomoloff has had multiple roles related to ice hockey. He has served in the Finnish Ice Hockey Association since 1990 and been its vice chairman since 1997. In addition he was the chief executive officer of the Ice Hockey Foundation from 1974 until 2013 and has had roles in the International Ice Hockey Federation. He has had a hand in organising all of the Ice Hockey World Championships arranged in Finland. He remains a qualified referee. He served as a referee in the Finnish champions league between 1962 and 1965. In 2006, he was inducted into the Finnish Hockey Hall of Fame in the Influencer category with the number 185.

In July 2012, Bogomoloff caused a slight stir by saying that he thought the University of Lapland was a reservation for people on benefits, the graduates from which were good only for snow plowing tasks. He later apologised for his words.

He caused another stir on May 7, 2018, with an update on Facebook: "There was a group of three Balkan-dark men out and about in the beachfront park (northern shore) seemingly without a reason. FYI." The update was widely condemned as being racist.
