= Esko (disambiguation) =

Esko is a Finnish name.

Esko may also refer to:

- Esko, Minnesota
- Esko (company), a Belgian graphic arts company
- Esko Prague, a commuter rail system
- Esko Moravian-Silesian Region, a commuter rail system
