= Finnish Hockey Hall of Fame =

Ice hockey museum in Tampere, Finland

Coordinates: 61°30′11″N 23°45′37″E

Suomen Jääkiekkomuseo
- Finnish Ice Hockey Museum
- Established: 1979
- Location: Vapriikki Museum Centre; Alaverstaanraitti 5 Tampere, Finland
- Type: Sports museum and hall of fame
- Chairperson: Mika Sulin
- Website: Official website (in Finnish)

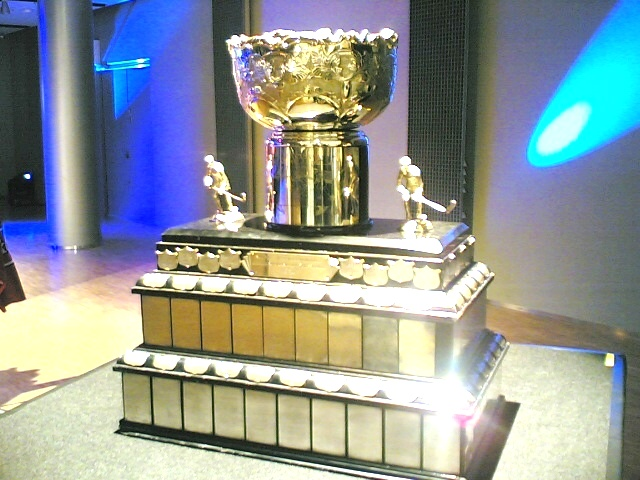
Kanada-malja on display in the Suomen Jääkiekkomuseo.

The Finnish Hockey Hall of Fame is housed in and administered by the Suomen Jääkiekkomuseo ('Finnish Ice Hockey Museum'), a part of the Vapriikki Museum Centre, in Tampere, Finland. The mission of the Finnish Hockey Hall of Fame is to record, document, and exhibit objects, photographs, and printed materials related to Finnish ice hockey. The original Kanada-malja and the Aurora Borealis Cup are on display along with a number of active-use Liiga awards and hockey memorabilia including sweaters and game-used gear from past seasons.

When the hall of fame was established on 14 June 1979, its founding members included Aarne Honkavaara, Kalervo Kummola, Kimmo Leinonen, Harry Lindblad, and others. Notable chairpersons of the hall of fame have included, Harry Lindblad (1979–1983), Aarne Honkavaara (1983–1996), Unto Wiitala (1996–2001), and Kimmo Leinonen (2011–2018).

Since 1985, the Hockey Hall of Fame Finland has honored distinguished players, coaches, referees, influencers, and members of the media who have made significant impact on ice hockey in Finland, naming them each a Suomen Jääkiekkoleijona (lit. 'Finnish Ice Hockey Lion'). Each Jääkiekkoleijona is designated with the chronological number of their induction. Including the induction class of 2025, there are 286 inductees in the Hockey Hall of Fame Finland. Of the 286 inductees, fourteen are women.

== Inductees ==
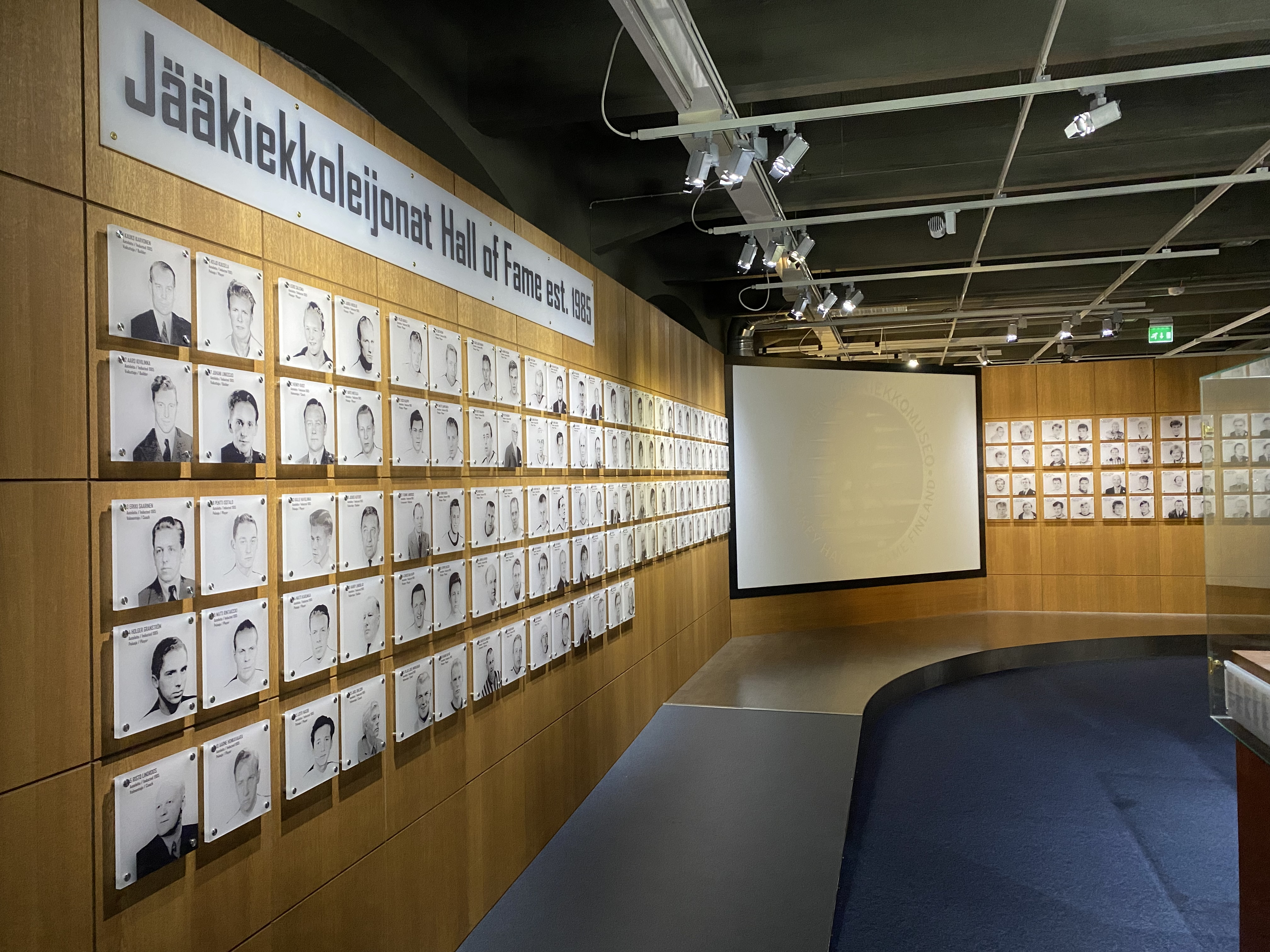
The Hockey Hall of Fame Finland at the Suomen Jääkiekkomuseo.

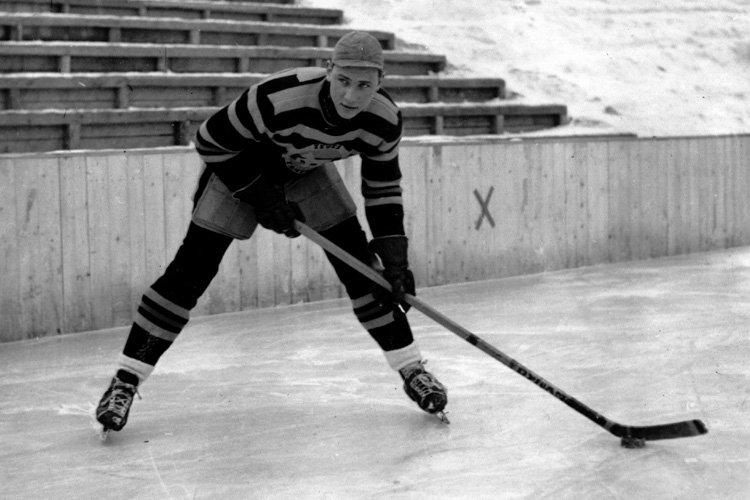
Aarne Honkavaara, Jääkiekkoleijona #10.

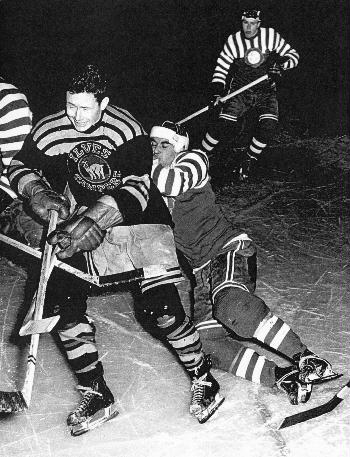
Teppo Rastio, Jääkiekkoleijona #29, while playing with Tampereen Ilves in 1958.

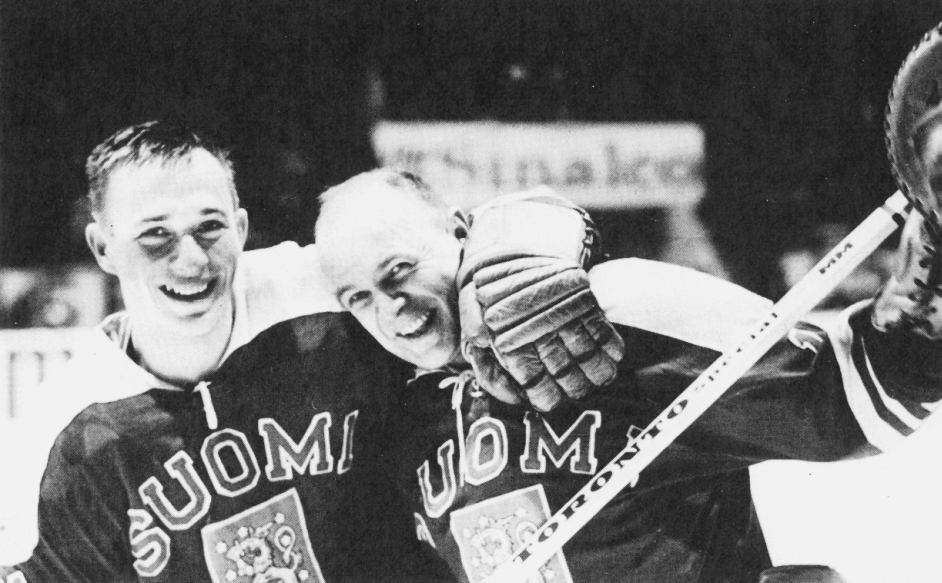
Matti Keinonen, Jääkiekkoleijona #50, and Juhani Lahtinen, #34, after a Leijonat game against Sweden in 1965.

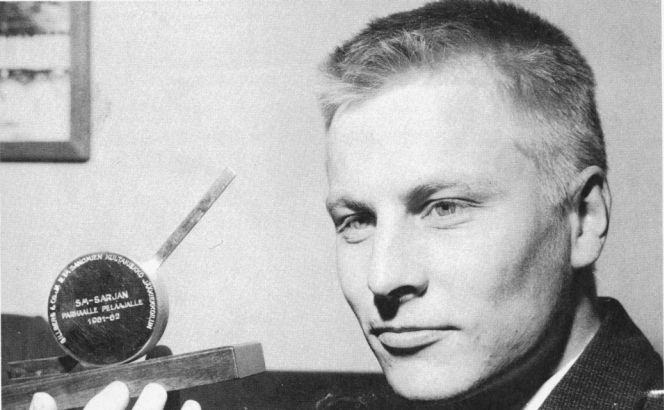
Juhani Wahlsten, Jääkiekkoleijona #43, after receiving the SM-sarja Best Player Award for the 1961-62 season.

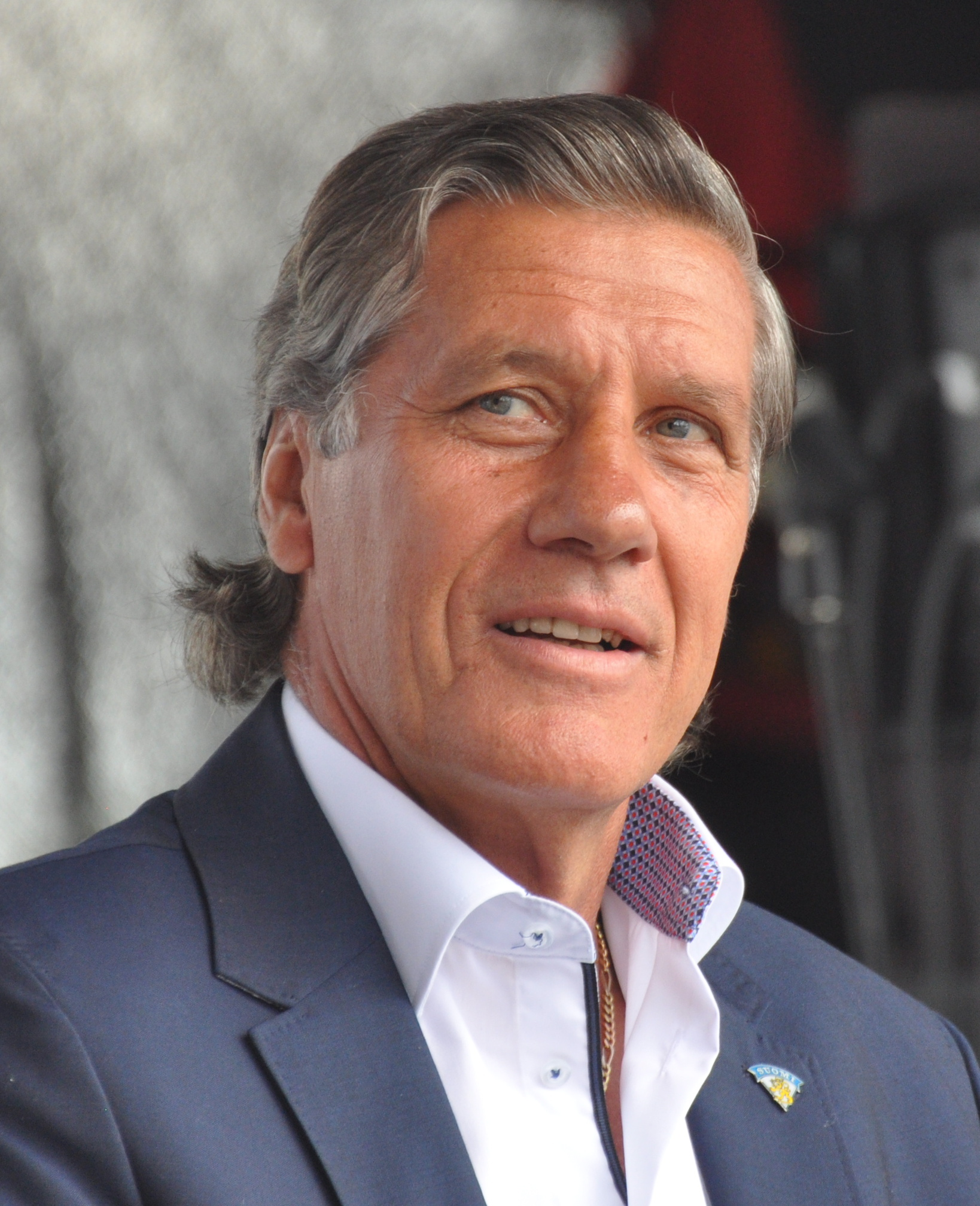
Veli-Pekka Ketola, Jääkiekkoleijona #72, at a public appearance in Pori in 2015.

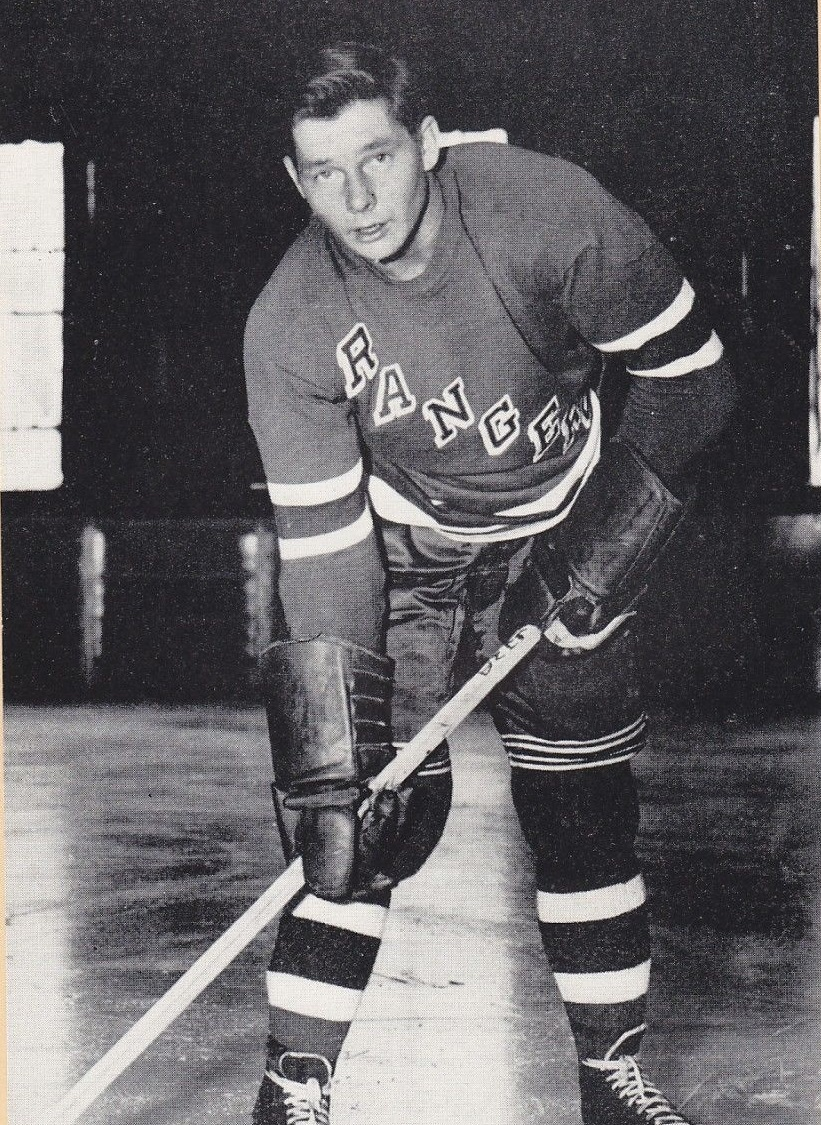
Pentti Lund, Jääkiekkoleijona #84, while playing with the New York Rangers in 1951.

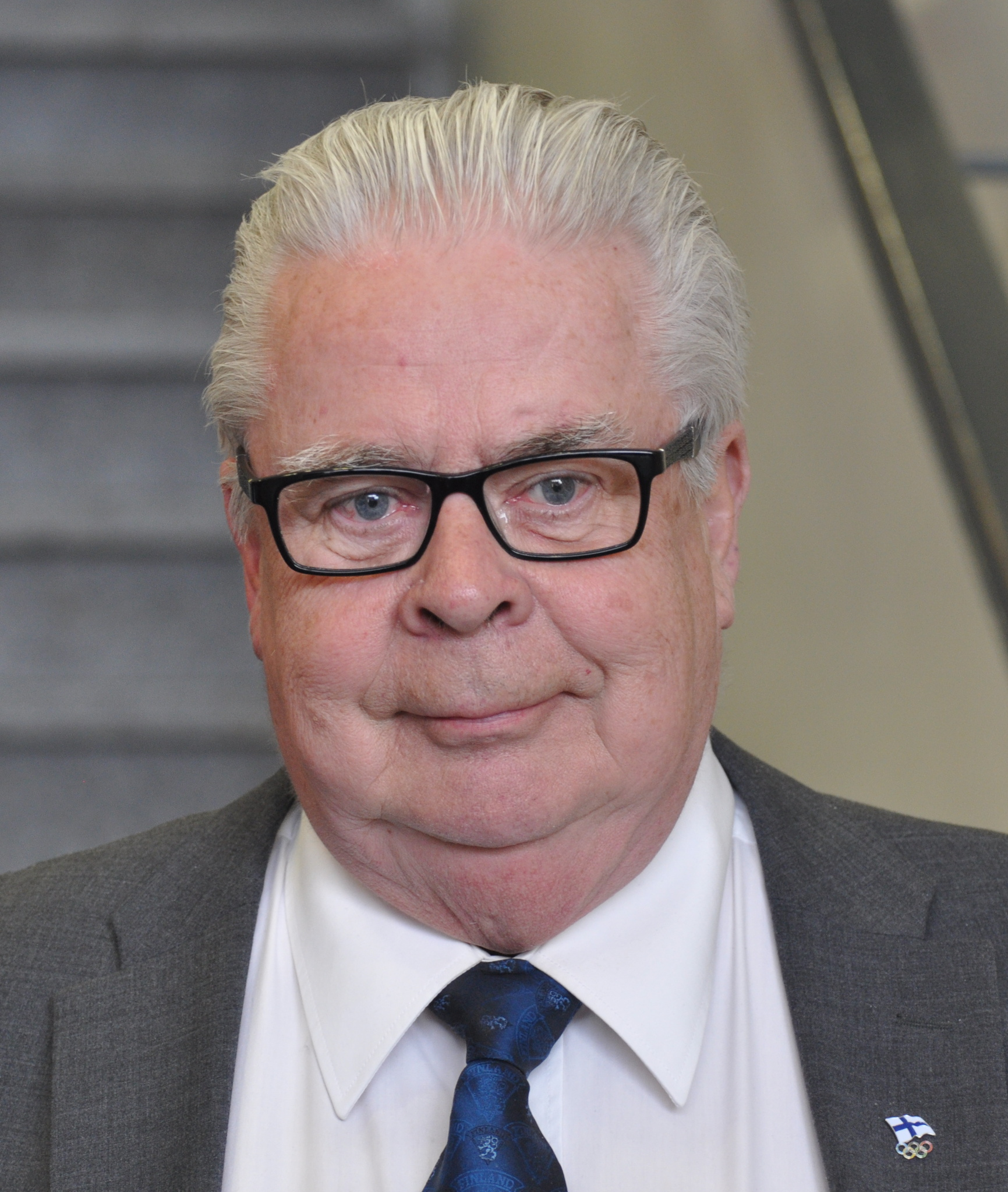
Kalervo Kummola, Jääkiekkoleijona #106, in 2015.

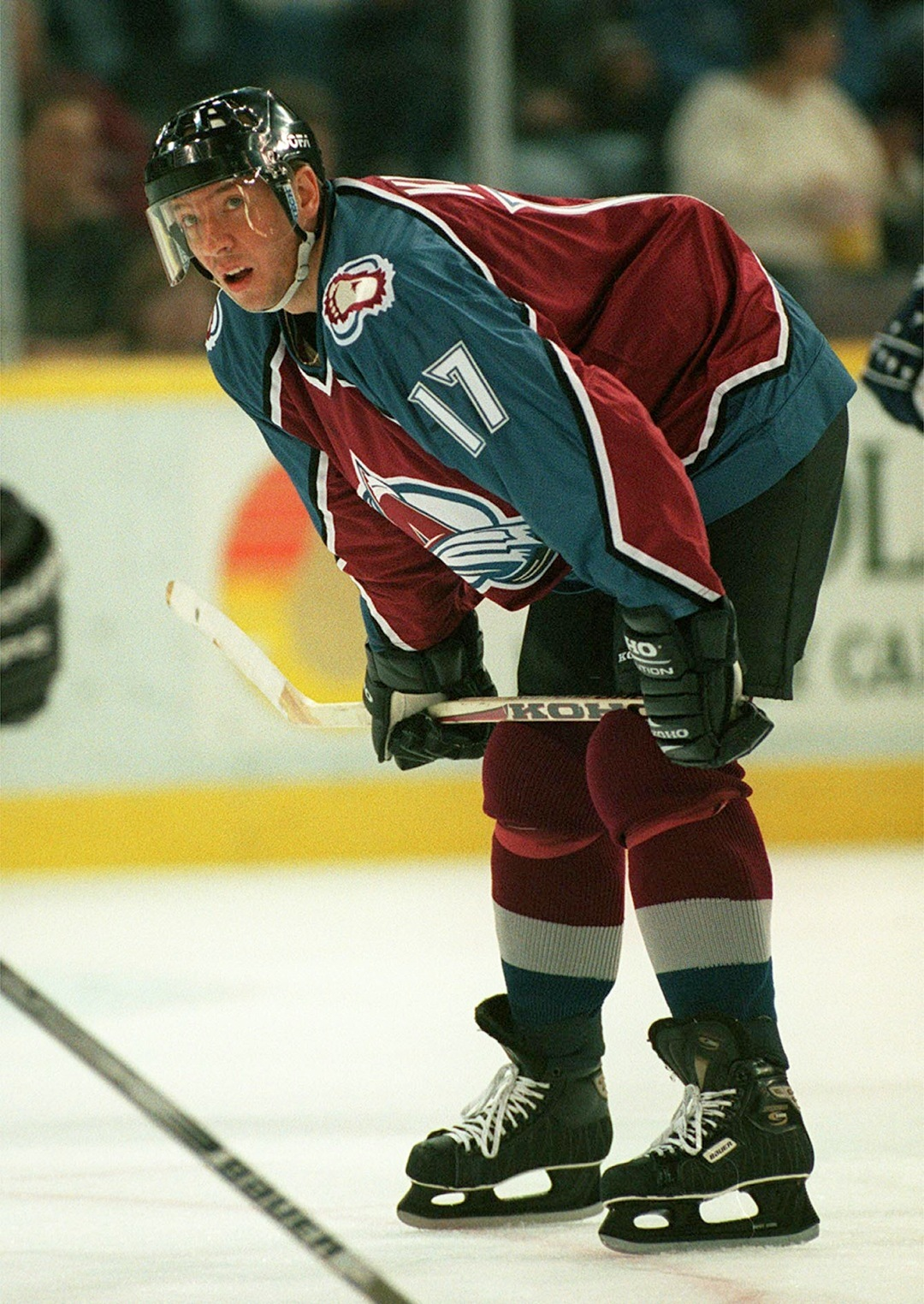
Jari Kurri, Jääkiekkoleijona #113, while playing with the Colorado Avalanche in 1998.

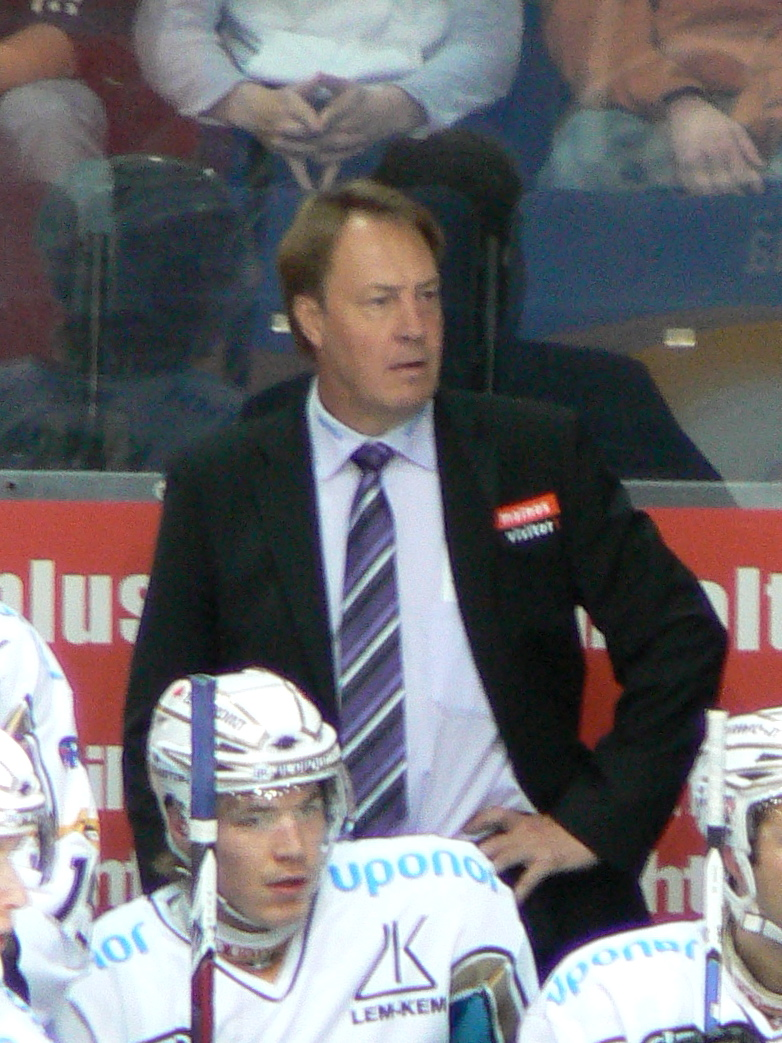
Hannu Aravirta, Jääkiekkoleijona #182, coaching the Lahti Pelicans in 2008.

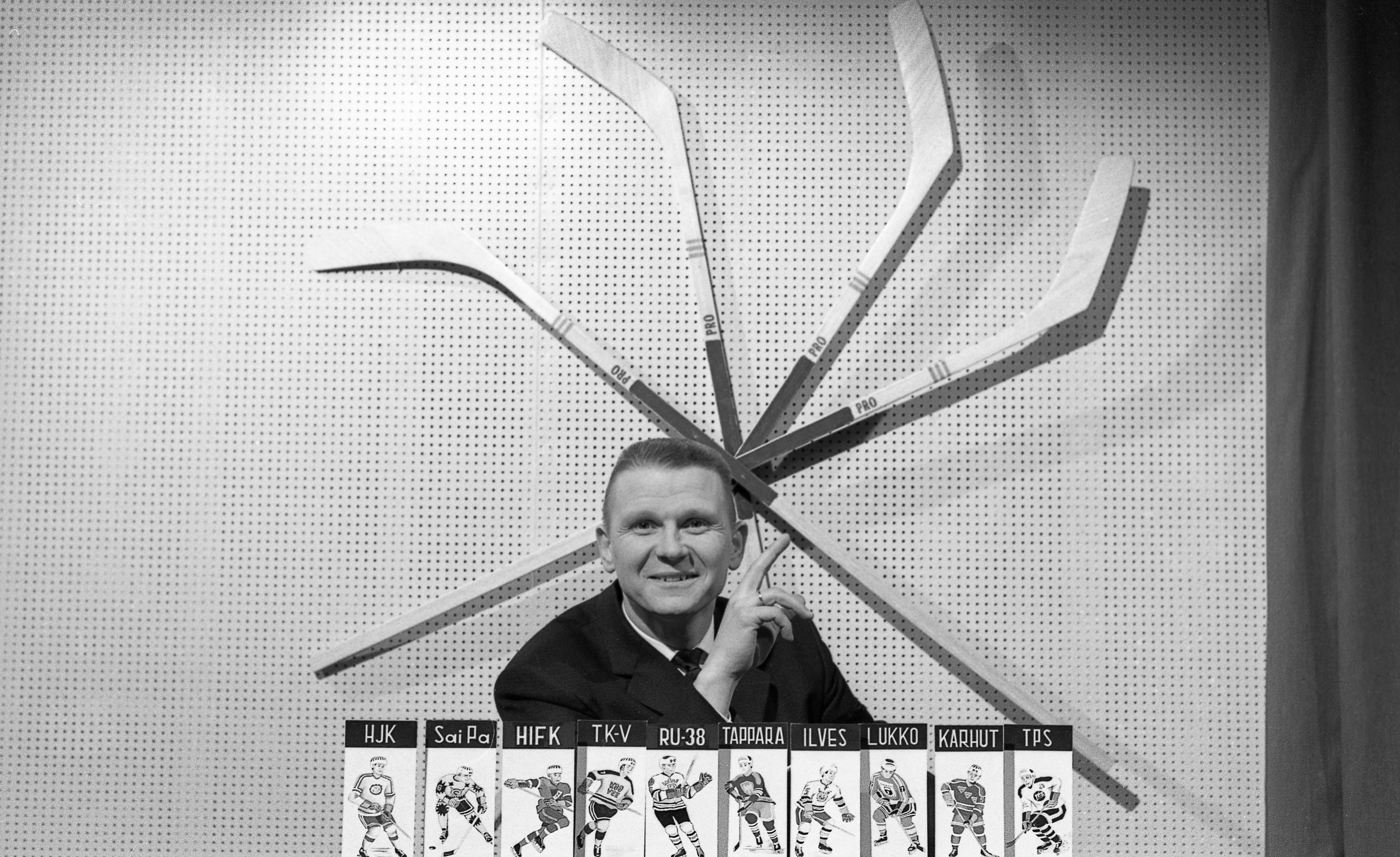
Anssi Koskinen, Jääkiekkoleijona #191, while hosting the hockey television show Lätkäruutu in 1964.

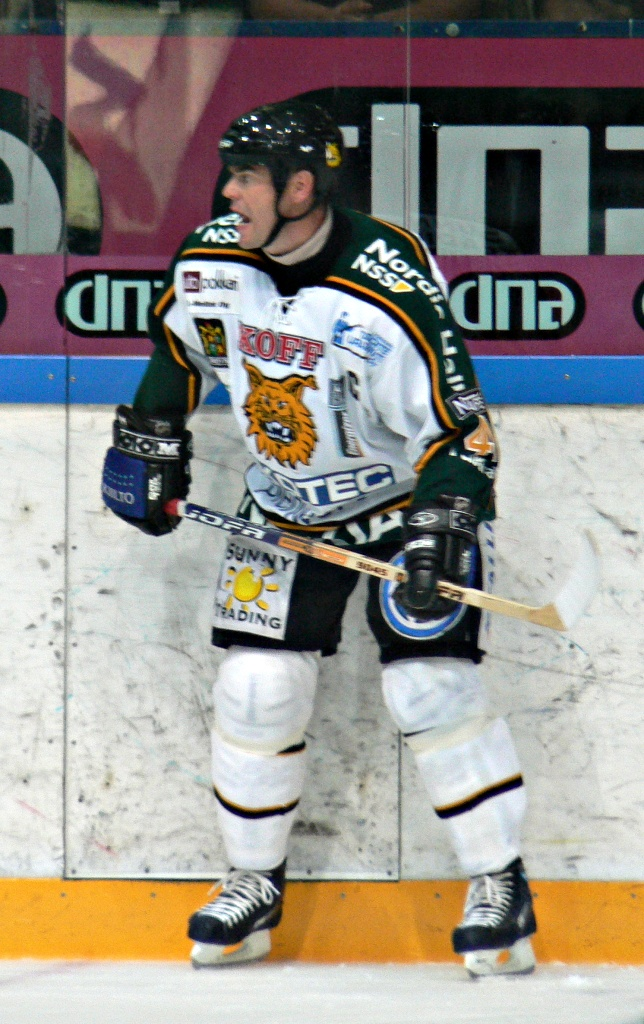
Raimo Helminen, Jääkiekkoleijona #192, while playing with Tampereen Ilves in 2008.

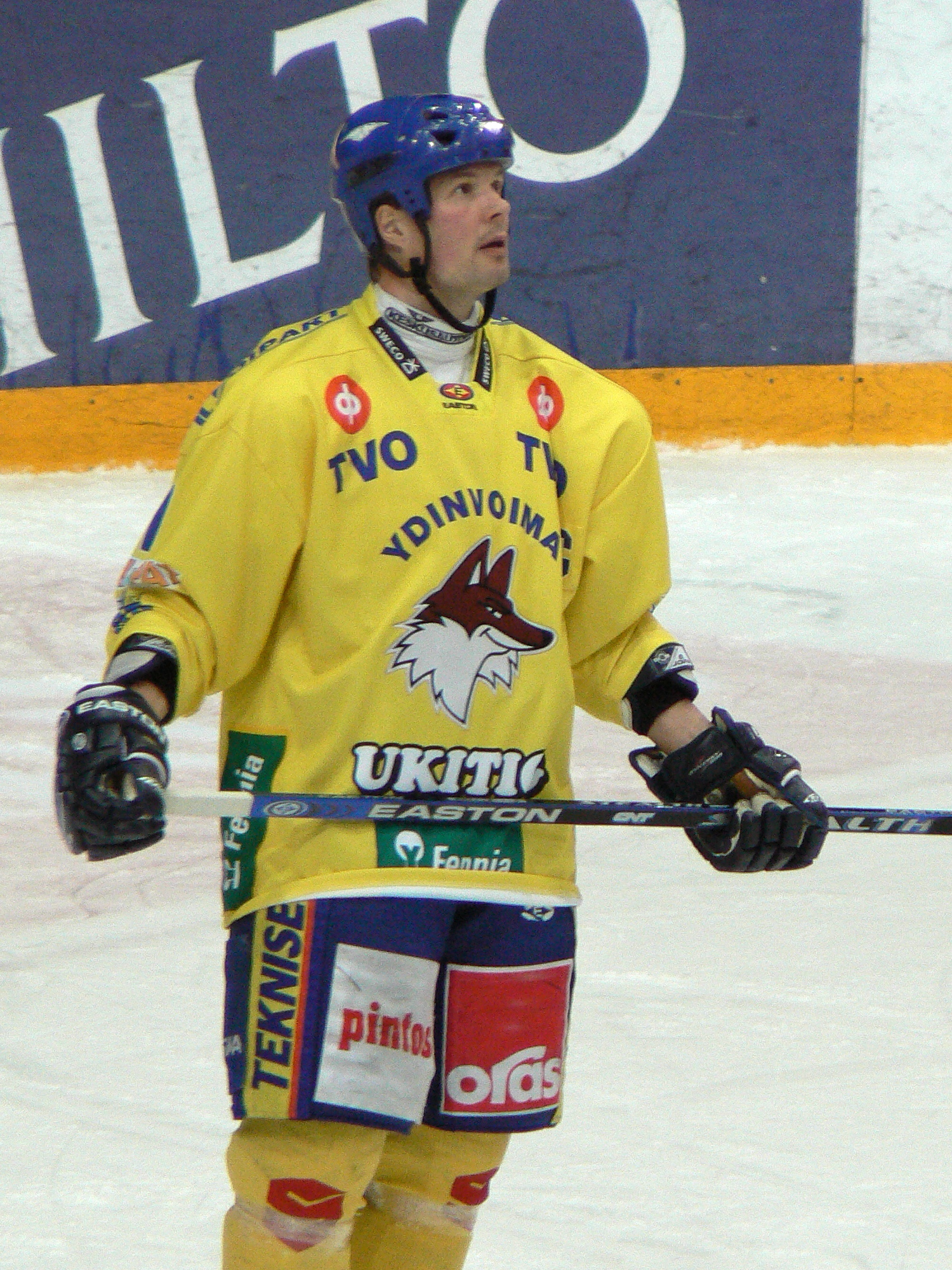
Erik Hämäläinen, Jääkiekkoleijona #193, while playing with Lukko in his 1001st (and last) SM-liiga regular season game in March 2008.

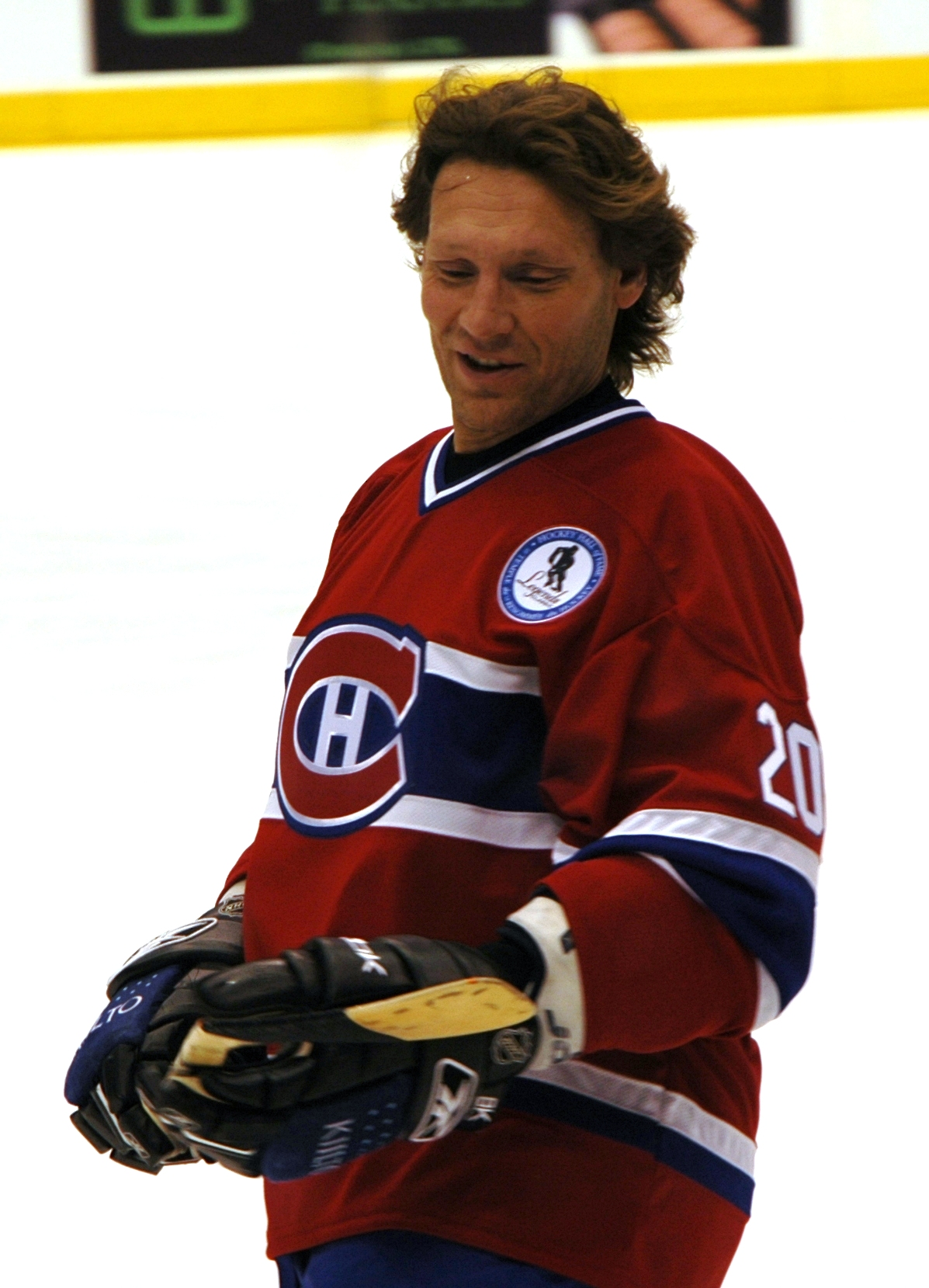
Jyrki Lumme, Jääkiekkoleijona #196, while playing with the Montreal Canadiens Alumni at the Legends Classic in 2008.

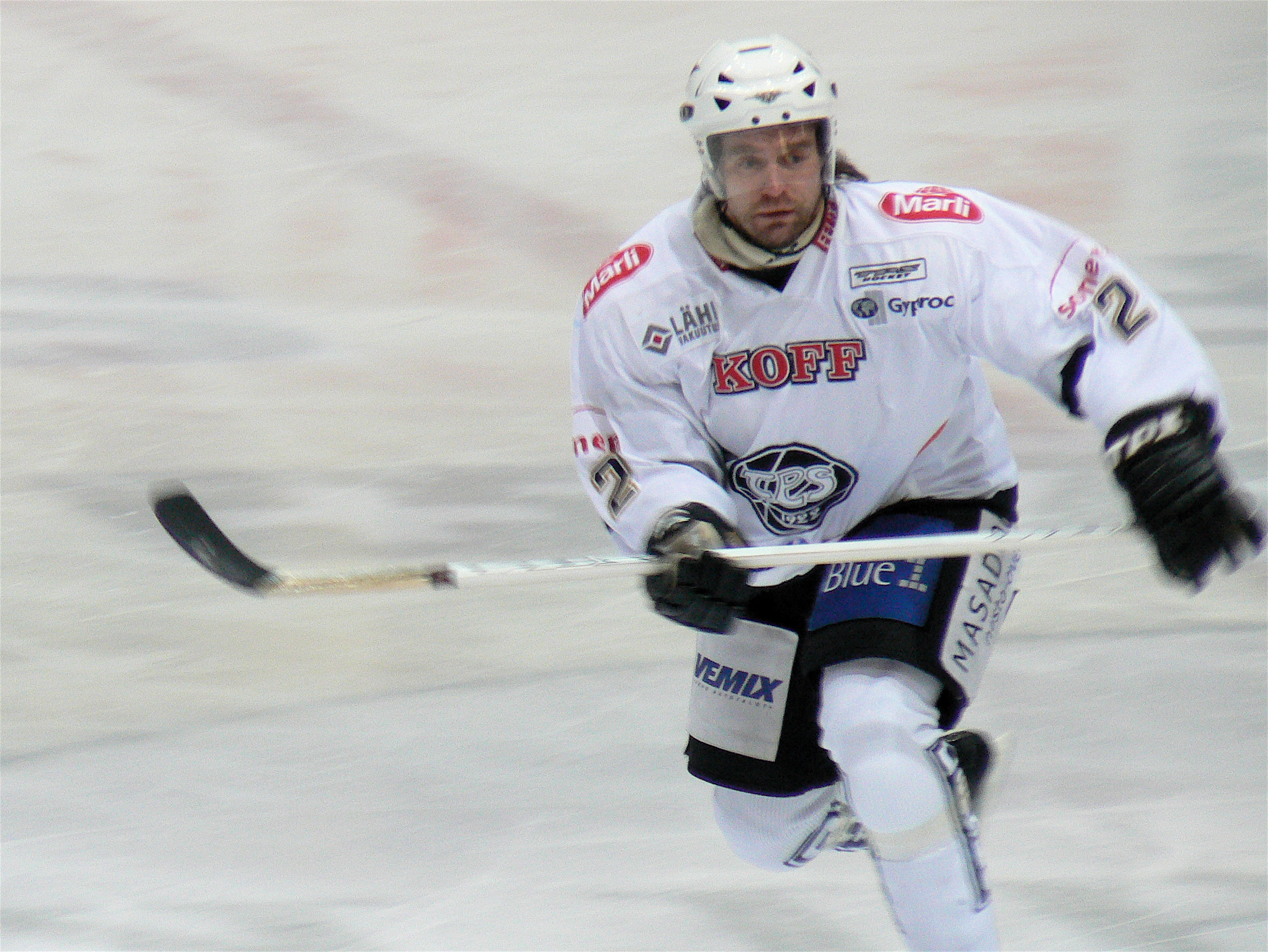
Marko Kiprusoff, Jääkiekkoleijona #208, while playing with TPS Turku in 2008.

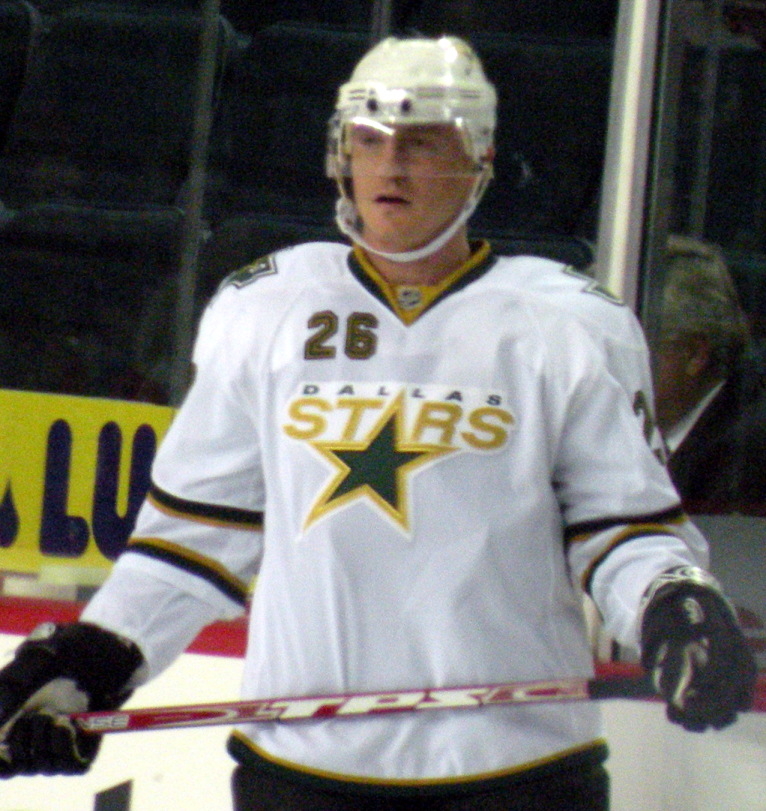
Jere Lehtinen, Jääkiekkoleijona #207, while playing for the Dallas Stars in 2008.

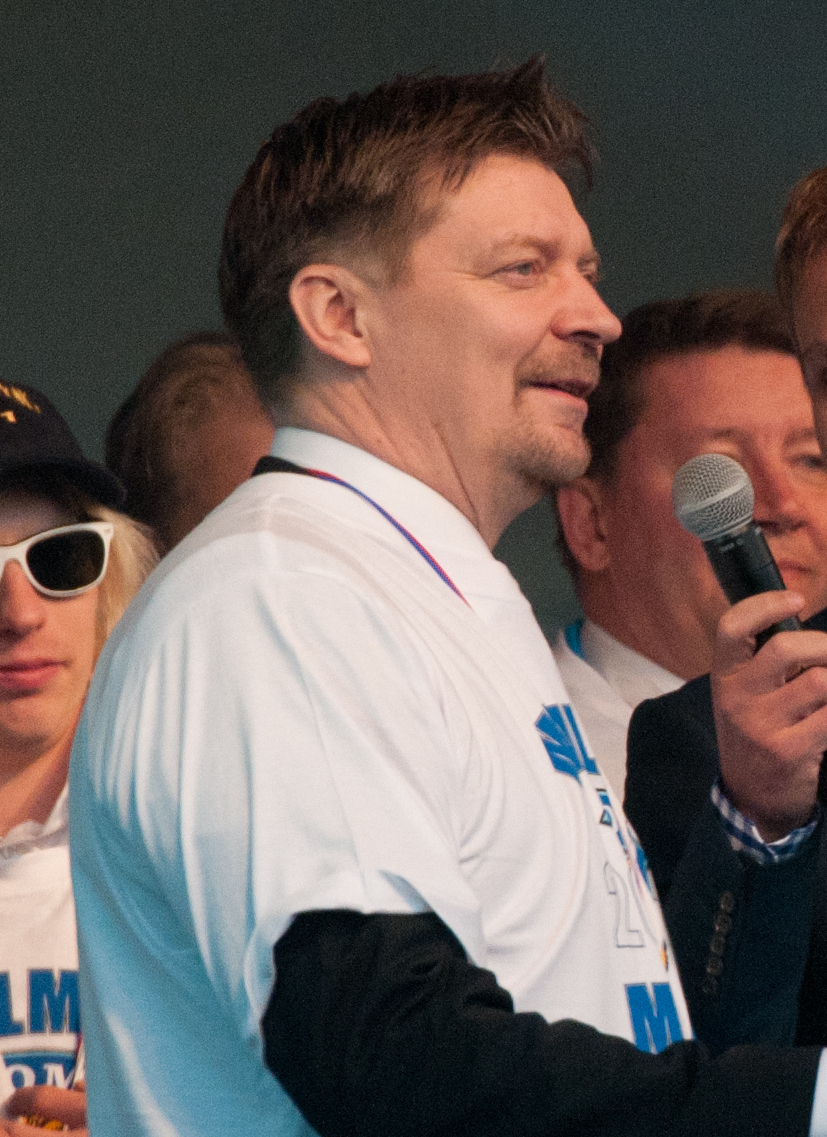
Jukka Jalonen, Jääkiekkoleijona #210, at 2011 IIHF World Championship gold medal celebrations in Helsinki.

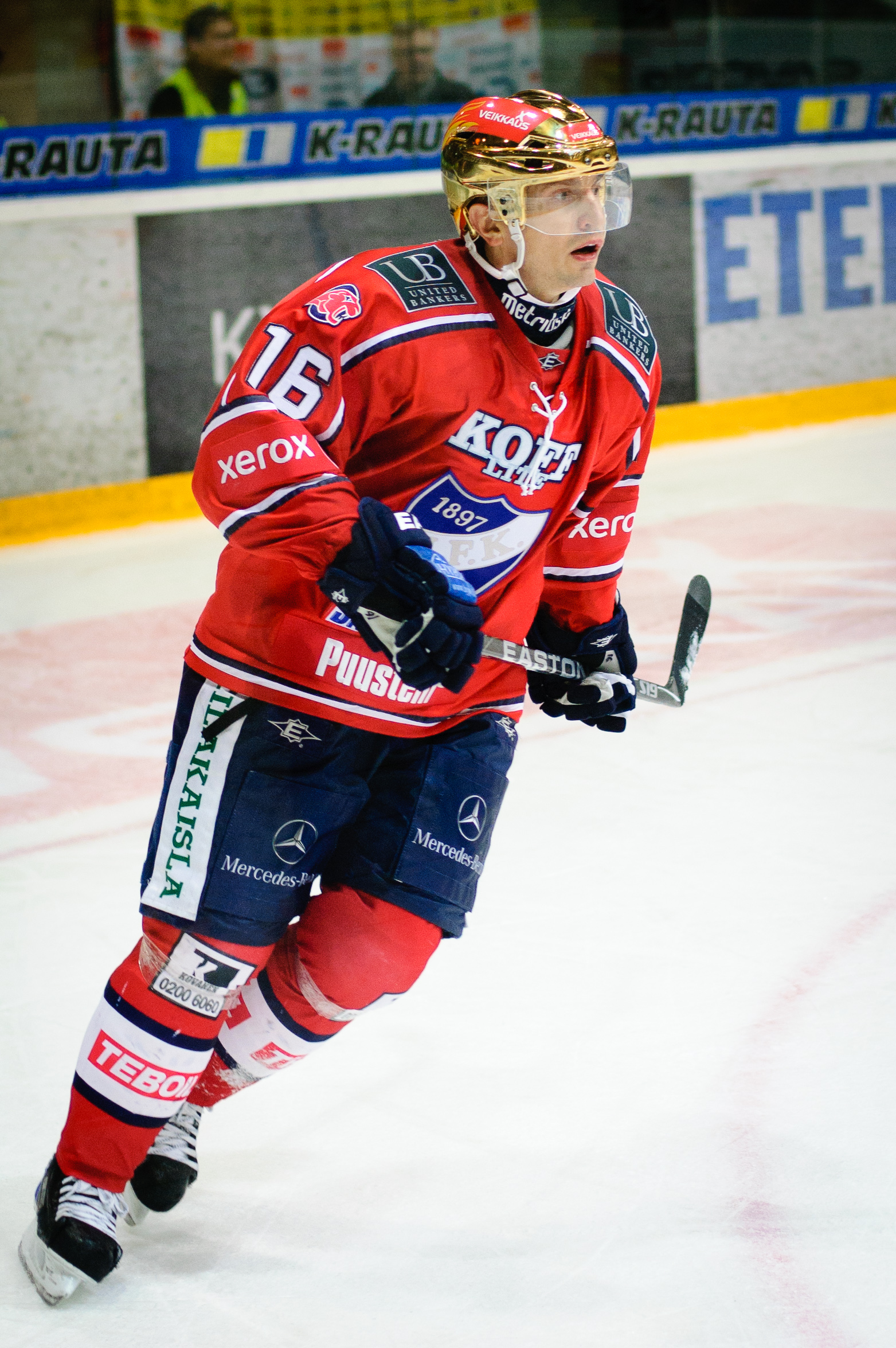
Ville Peltonen, Jääkiekkoleijona #226, while playing with HIFK in 2010.

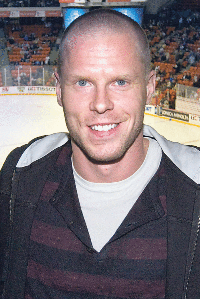
Saku Koivu, Jääkiekkoleijona #228.

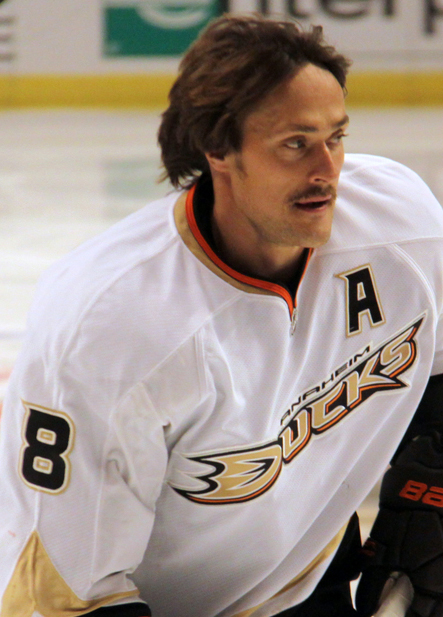
Teemu Selänne, Jääkiekkoleijona #232, while playing with the Anaheim Ducks in 2010.

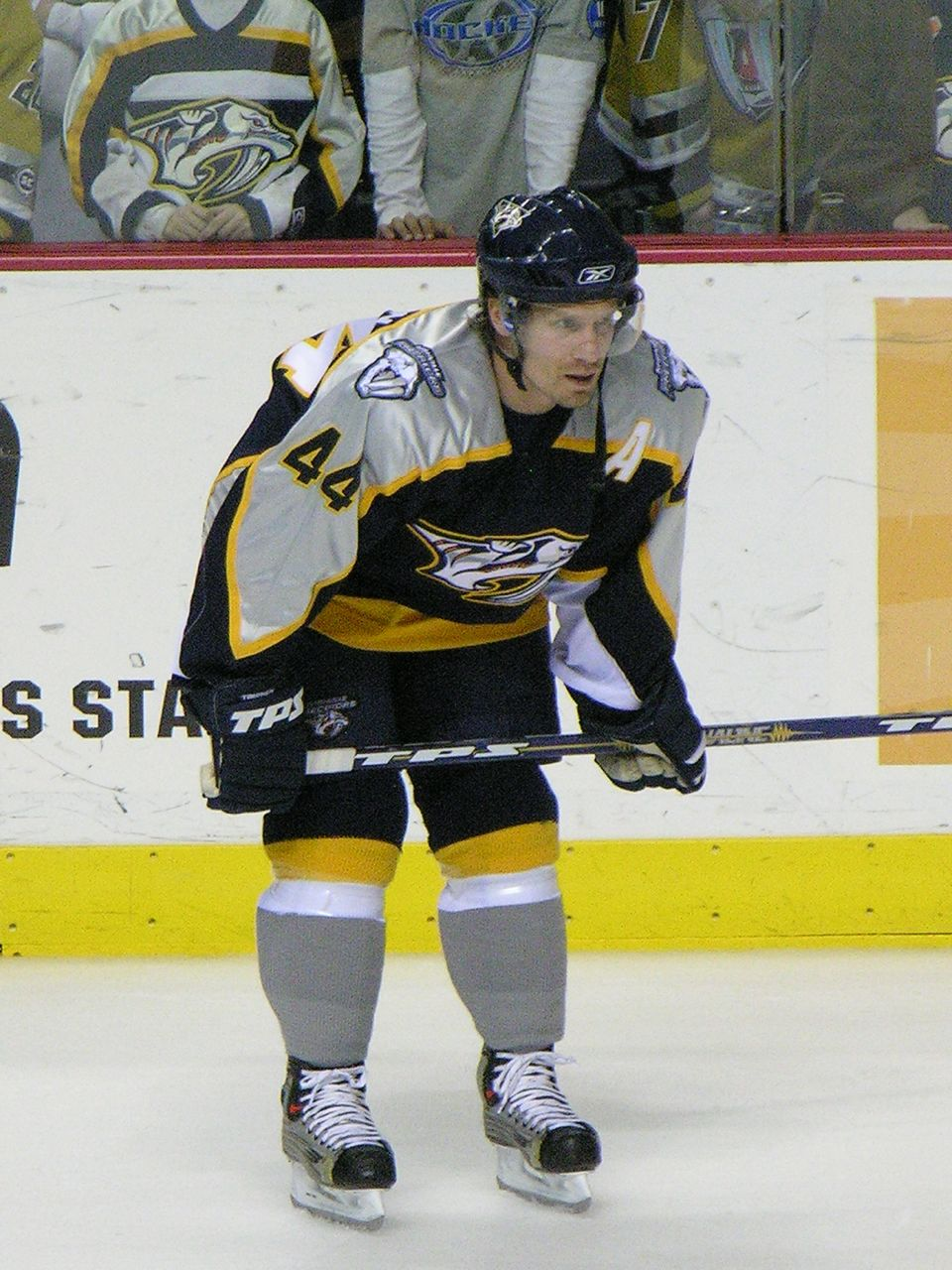
Kimmo Timonen, Jääkiekkoleijona #251, while playing with the Nashville Predators in 2009.

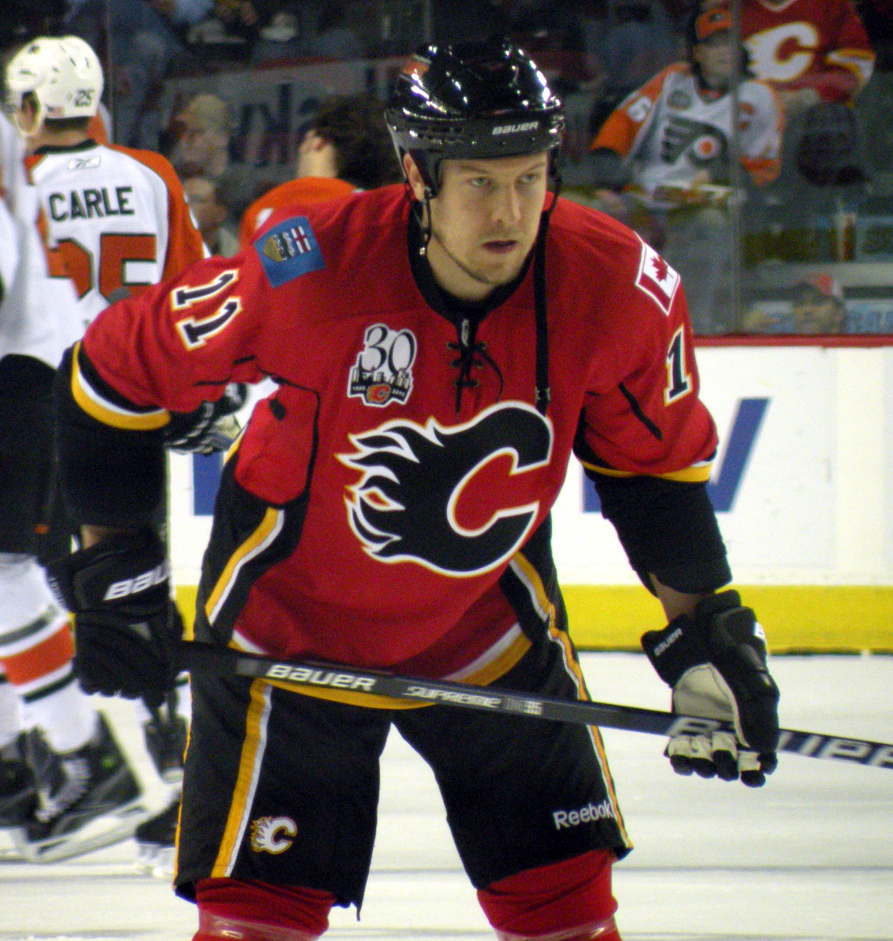
Niklas Hagman, Jääkiekkoleijona #257, while playing with the Calgary Flames in 2010.

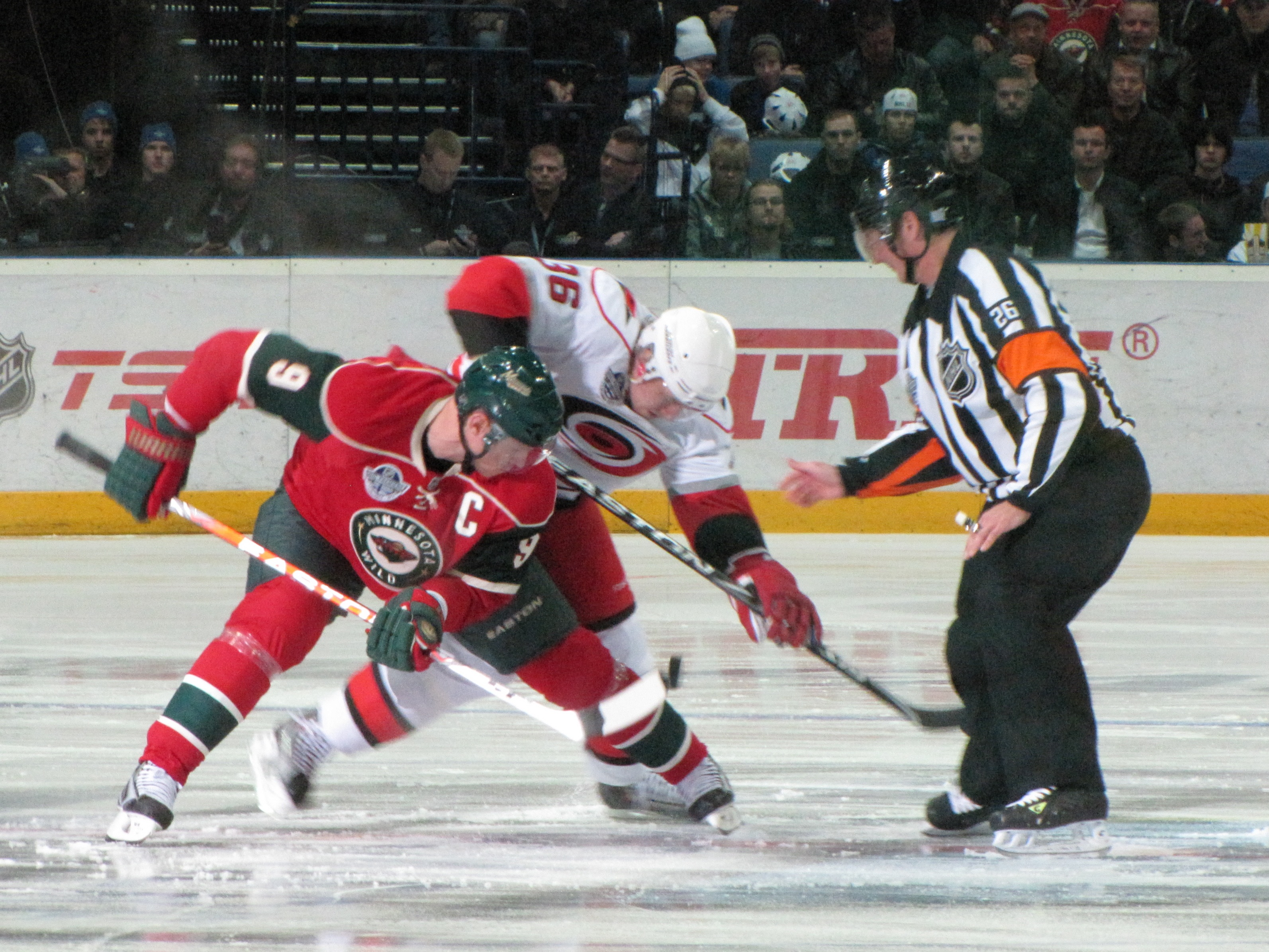
Mikko Koivu (green helmet), Jääkiekkoleijona #264, and Jussi Jokinen (white helmet), #275, in 2010 while playing for the Minnesota Wild and Carolina Hurricanes, respectively.

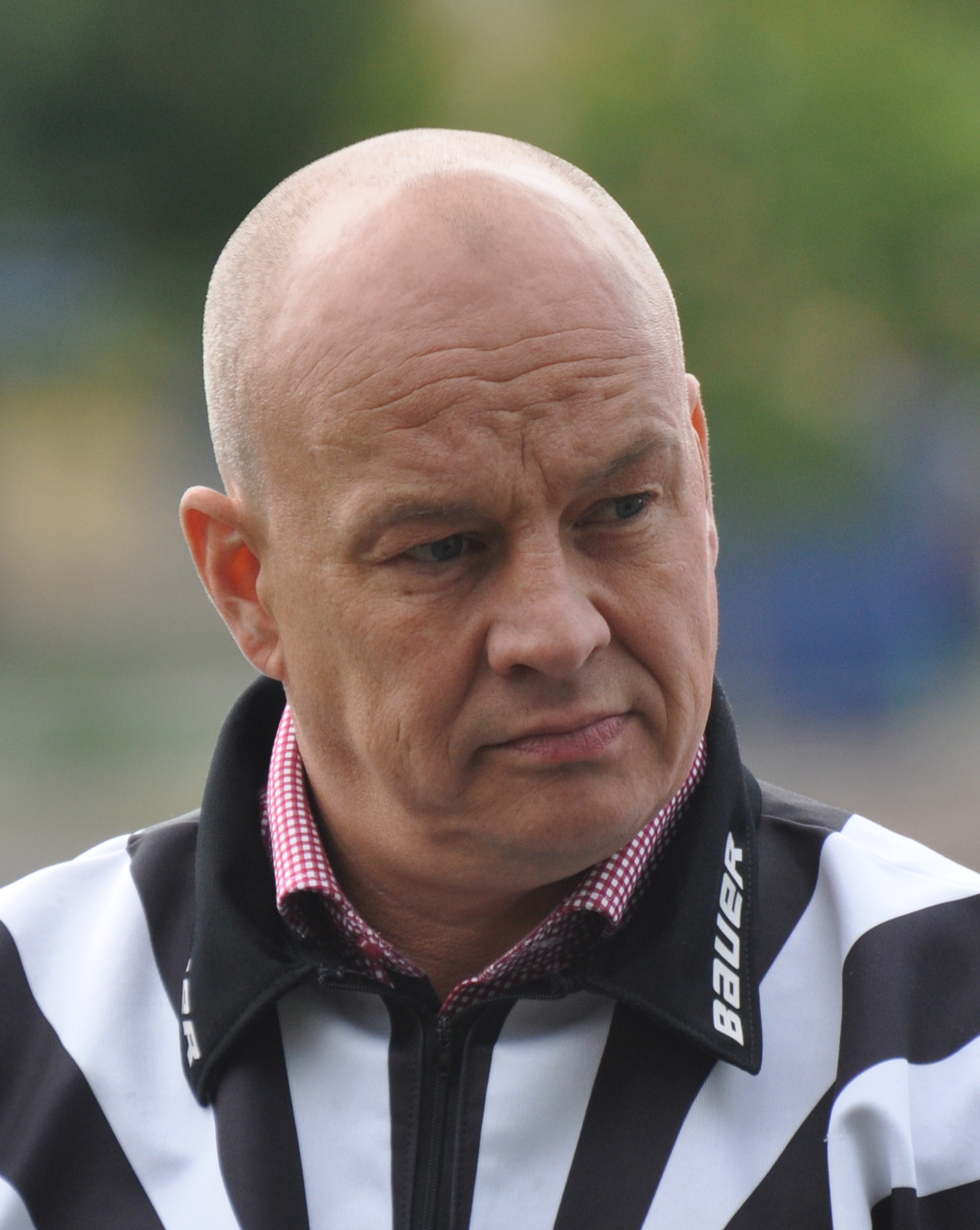
Jari Levonen, Jääkiekkoleijona #278, in 2013.

Year of induction	Number	Person	Category
1985	1	Kauko Karvonen	Influencer
1985	2	Aaro Kivilinna	Influencer
1985	3	Erkki Saarinen	Coach
1985	4	Holger Granström	Player
1985	5	Risto Lindroos	Coach
1985	6	Keijo Kuusela	Player
1985	7	Juhani Linkosuo	Influencer
1985	8	Pentti Isotalo	Player
1985	9	Matti Rintakoski	Player
1985	10	Aarne Honkavaara	Player
1985	11	Eero Salisma	Player
1985	12	Henry Kvist	Coach
1985	13	Kalle Havulinna	Player
1985	14	Matti Karumaa	Player
1985	15	Lotfi Nasib	Player
1985	16	Jukka Wuolio	Player
1985	17	Unto Wiitala	Player
1985	18	Jouko Autero	Media
1985	19	Harry Lindblad	Influencer
1985	20	Jarl Ohlson	Coach
1985	21	Yrjö Hakala	Player
1985	22	Ossi Kauppi	Player
1985	23	Tuomo Lindroos	Referee
1985	24	Christian Rapp	Player
1985	25	Joe Wirkkunen	Coach
1985	26	Esko Niemi	Player
1985	27	Matti Lampainen	Player
1985	28	Erkki Koiso	Player
1985	29	Teppo Rastio	Player
1985	30	Raimo Kilpiö	Player
1985	31	Esko Luostarinen	Player
1985	32	Pertti Nieminen	Player
1985	33	Heino Pulli	Player
1985	34	Juhani Lahtinen	Player
1985	35	Sakari Sillankorva	Referee
1985	36	Jarmo Wasama	Player
1986	37	Otto Wuorio	Influencer
1986	38	Esko Rekomaa	Player
1986	39	Seppo Liitsola	Player
1986	40	Mauno Nurmi	Player
1986	41	Voitto Soini	Player
1986	42	Jouni Seistamo	Player
1986	43	Juhani Wahlsten	Player
1986	44	Kalevi Numminen	Player
1986	45	Seppo Nikkilä	Player
1986	46	Teuvo Myyryläinen	Coach
1986	47	Jorma Suokko	Player
1986	48	Matti Reunamäki	Player
1987	49	Lasse Heikkilä	Coach
1987	50	Matti Keinonen	Player
1987	51	Seppo Lindström	Player
1987	52	Lalli Partinen	Player
1987	53	Lasse Oksanen	Player
1987	54	Raimo Sepponen	Referee
1988	55	Carl-Magnus Brander	Coach
1988	56	Jorma Nykänen	Influencer
1988	57	Paavo Pitkänen	Influencer
1988	58	Antti Heikkilä	Player
1988	59	Reijo Hakanen	Player
1988	60	Jorma Peltonen	Player
1988	61	Urpo Ylönen	Player
1988	62	Ilkka Mesikämmen	Player
1989	63	Esko Paltanen	Influencer
1989	64	Ilpo Koskela	Player
1989	65	Juha Rantasila	Player
1989	66	Jorma Vehmanen	Player
1989	67	Jorma Valtonen	Player
1990	68	Pekka Marjamäki	Player
1990	69	Esa Peltonen	Player
1990	70	Antti Leppänen	Player
1990	71	Seppo Repo	Player
1990	72	Veli-Pekka Ketola	Player
1991	73	Karl-Gustav Kaisla	Referee
1991	74	Matias Helenius	Influencer
1991	75	Lauri Mononen	Player
1991	76	Harri Linnonmaa	Player
1991	77	Matti Murto	Player
1991	78	Heikki Riihiranta	Player
1991	79	Juhani Tamminen	Player
1991	80	Timo Nummelin	Player
1991	81	Timo Sutinen	Player
1991	82	Göran Stubb	Influencer
1992	83	Usko Teromaa	Influencer
1992	84	Pentti Lund	Player
1992	85	Hannu Haapalainen	Player
1992	86	Pertti Koivulahti	Player
1992	87	Reijo Leppänen	Player
1992	88	Seppo Suoraniemi	Player
1992	89	Pertti Valkeapää	Player
1993	90	Seppo Ahokainen	Player
1993	91	Pekka Rautakallio	Player
1993	92	Martti Jarkko	Player
1993	93	Lasse Vanhanen	Referee
1994	94	Eero Saari	Player
1994	95	Esko Tie	Player
1994	96	Lasse Litma	Player
1994	97	Jukka Porvari	Player
1995	98	Matti Hagman	Player
1995	99	Kari Makkonen	Player
1995	100	Tapio Levo	Player
1995	101	Mikko Leinonen	Player
1995	102	Pertti Juhola	Referee
1995	103	Teuvo Honkalinna	Influencer
1996	104	Henry Leppä	Player
1996	105	Kari Eloranta	Player
1996	106	Kalervo Kummola	Influencer
1997	107	Ilkka Sinisalo	Player
1997	108	Erkki Lehtonen	Player
1997	109	Teemu Hiltunen	Influencer
1998	110	Tapio Koskinen	Player
1998	111	Markus Mattsson	Player
1998	112	Risto Siltanen	Player
1998	113	Jari Kurri	Player
1998	114	Pertti Lehtonen	Player
1998	115	Hannu Kamppuri	Player
1998	116	Matti Forss	Player
1998	117	Kai Hietarinta	Influencer
1998	118	Aulis Virtanen	Media
1999	119	Antero Karapalo	Media
2000	120	Timo Susi	Player
2000	121	Arto Javanainen	Player
2000	122	Reijo Ruotsalainen	Player
2000	123	Kari Jalonen	Player
2000	124	Pekka Tuomisto	Player
2000	125	Frank Moberg	Player
2000	126	Arto Lehtiö	Player
2002	127	Timo Blomqvist	Player
2002	128	Tomi Mäkipää	Influencer
2003	129	Jorma Salmi	Player
2003	130	Jukka Tammi	Player
2003	131	Arto Ruotanen	Player
2003	132	Timo Jutila	Player
2003	133	Hannu Virta	Player
2003	134	Christian Ruuttu	Player
2003	135	Pentti Matikainen	Coach
2003	136	Seppo Mäkelä	Referee
2003	137	Pentti Lindegren	Media
2004	138	Risto Jalo	Player
2004	139	Mikko Mäkelä	Player
2004	140	Esa Keskinen	Player
2004	141	Petri Skriko	Player
2004	142	Raimo Summanen	Player
2004	143	Esa Tikkanen	Player
2004	144	Timo Turunen	Player
2004	145	Stig Wetzell	Player
2004	146	Gustav Bubník	Coach
2004	147	Carl Brewer	Coach
2004	148	Curt Lindström	Coach
2004	149	Alpo Suhonen	Coach
2004	150	Hilpas Sulin	Coach
2004	151	Jarmo Jalarvo	Referee
2004	152	Seppo Helle	Influencer
2004	153	Aimo Mäkinen	Influencer
2004	154	Martin Saarikangas	Influencer
2004	155	Juhani Ikonen	Influencer
2004	156	Anssi Kukkonen	Media
2004	157	Juhani Syvänen	Media
2004	158	Hannu Lindroos	Media
2005	159	Hannu Kapanen	Player
2005	160	Markus Ketterer	Player
2005	161	Sakari Lindfors	Player
2005	162	Jari Lindroos	Player
2005	163	Reijo Mikkolainen	Player
2005	164	Mika Nieminen	Player
2005	165	Marko Palo	Player
2005	166	Jouni Rinne	Player
2005	167	Rauno Korpi	Coach
2005	168	Janne Rautavuori	Referee
2005	169	Lasse Laukkanen	Influencer
2005	170	Hannu Ansas	Influencer
2005	171	Harri Lintumäki	Influencer
2005	172	Tapani Mattila	Influencer
2006	173	Ville Sirén	Player
2006	174	Simo Saarinen	Player
2006	175	Pekka Järvelä	Player
2006	176	Hannu Järvenpää	Player
2006	177	Pekka Arbelius	Player
2006	178	Timo Saarikoski	Player
2006	179	Kari Takko	Player
2006	180	Darren Boyko	Player
2006	181	Otakar Janecký	Player
2006	182	Hannu Aravirta	Coach
2006	183	Hannu Jortikka	Coach
2006	184	Jarmo Männistö	Influencer
2006	185	Harry Bogomoloff	Influencer
2006	186	Urpo Helkovaara	Influencer
2007	187	Marianne Ihalainen	Player
2007	188	Janne Laukkanen	Player
2007	189	Antti Törmänen	Player
2007	190	Riikka Sallinen (née Nieminen; prev. Välilä)	Player
2007	191	Anssi Koskinen	Influencer
2009	192	Raimo Helminen	Player
2009	193	Erik Hämäläinen	Player
2009	194	Sari Krooks	Player
2009	195	Tero Lehterä	Player
2009	196	Jyrki Lumme	Player
2009	197	Jarmo Myllys	Player
2009	198	Juha Ylönen	Player
2009	199	Vladimir Yurzinov	Coach
2009	200	Erkka Westerlund	Coach
2009	201	Rainer Grannas	Referee
2010	202	Teppo Numminen	Player
2010	203	Matti Rautiainen	Player
2010	204	Rauno Mokka	Influencer
2010	205	Matti Väisänen	Influencer
2011	206	Janne Ojanen	Player
2011	207	Jere Lehtinen	Player
2011	208	Marko Kiprusoff	Player
2011	209	Mika Strömberg	Player
2011	210	Jukka Jalonen	Coach
2011	211	Kimmo Leinonen	Influencer
2012	212	Aki Berg	Player
2012	213	Juha Lind	Player
2012	214	Pasi Nurminen	Player
2012	215	Timo Peltomaa	Player
2012	216	Hannu Soro	Influencer
2012	217	Pertti Kontto	Influencer
2012	218	Esa Sulkava	Influencer
2013	219	Iiro Järvi	Player
2013	220	Ari Sulander	Player
2013	221	Petri Varis	Player
2013	222	Pekka Paavola	Influencer
2014	223	Sari Marjamäki (née Fisk)	Player
2014	224	Sami Kapanen	Player
2014	225	Janne Niinimaa	Player
2014	226	Ville Peltonen	Player
2014	227	Anne Haanpää (née Bäckman)	Referee
2015	228	Saku Koivu	Player
2015	229	Pekka Leimu	Player
2015	230	Tiia Reima	Player
2015	231	Kimmo Rintanen	Player
2015	232	Teemu Selänne	Player
2015	233	Erkki Haapanen	Player
2015	234	Rauli Virtanen	Coach
2016	235	Päivi Virta	Player
2016	236	Jukka Hentunen	Player
2016	237	Miikka Kiprusoff	Player
2016	238	Toni Lydman	Player
2016	239	Don Baizley	Influencer
2016	240	Harry Harkimo	Influencer
2017	241	Erkki Laine	Player
2017	242	Antti-Jussi Niemi	Player
2017	243	Fredrik Norrena	Player
2017	244	Katja Riipi	Player
2017	245	Sami Salo	Player
2017	246	Juha Junno	Influencer
2018	247	Kirsi Hänninen	Player
2018	248	Olli Jokinen	Player
2018	249	Antero Niittymäki	Player
2018	250	Jarkko Ruutu	Player
2018	251	Kimmo Timonen	Player
2018	252	Jyri Rönn	Referee
2019	253	Petteri Nummelin	Player
2019	254	Antti Miettinen	Player
2019	255	Emma Terho (née Laaksonen)	Player
2019	256	Hannu Saintula	Coach
2021	257	Niklas Hagman	Player
2021	258	Niko Kapanen	Player
2021	259	Tuomo Ruutu	Player
2021	260	Petra Vaarakallio	Player
2021	261	Ossi Väänänen	Player
2021	262	Seppo Arponen	Influencer
2022	263	Niklas Bäckström	Player
2022	264	Mikko Koivu	Player
2022	265	Ilkka Mikkola	Player
2022	266	Saija Tarkki (née Sirviö)	Player
2022	267	Anu Saarni (née Hirvonen)	Referee
2022	268	Reijo Paajanen	Influencer
2023	269	Mikko Eloranta	Player
2023	270	Tuukka Mäntylä	Player
2023	271	Janne Pesonen	Player
2023	272	Jukka Rautakorpi	Coach
2023	273	Timo Favorin	Referee
2023	274	Heikki Hietanen	Influencer
2024	275	Jussi Jokinen	Player
2024	276	Lasse Kukkonen	Player
2024	277	Pekka Rinne	Player
2024	278	Jari Levonen	Referee
2024	279	Jarmo Kekäläinen	Influencer
2024	280	Markku Tuominen	Influencer
2025	281	Topi Jaakola	Player
2025	282	Mika Pyörälä	Player
2025	283	Tuukka Rask	Player
2025	284	Anssi Salmela	Player
2025	285	Johanna Kuisma (prev. Suban)	Referee
2025	286	Jukka-Pekka Vuorinen	Influencer

== See also ==
- Finnish Ice Hockey Association
- Ice hockey in Finland
- IIHF Hall of Fame
- Hockey Hall of Fame
