= Rantasila =

Rantasila is a Finnish surname. Notable people with the surname include:

- Juha Rantasila (born 1945), Finnish ice hockey player
- Mari Rantasila (born 1963), Finnish actress, film director, and singer
