= Eero Saari =

Finnish ice hockey player (1928–2023)

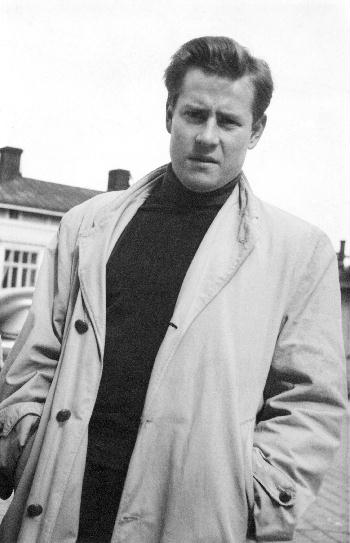
- Born: 18 September 1928 Tampere, Finland
- Died: 29 April 2023 (aged 94) Tampere, Finland
- Height: 170 cm (5 ft 7 in)
- Weight: 76 kg (168 lb; 12 st 0 lb)
- Position: Left Wing
- Shot: Left
- Played for: Ilves Tampere
- National team: Finland
- Playing career: 1944–1956

Eero Olavi Saari (18 September 1928 – 29 April 2023) was a Finnish professional ice hockey player who played with the Tampereen Ilves of the SM-liiga and with the Finnish national team. He represented Finland at the 1951 Ice Hockey World Championships and in the ice hockey tournament at the 1952 Winter Olympics.

Saari was inducted into the Hockey Hall of Fame Finland in 1994. He was named an Ilves Hockey Legend in a ceremony held on 7 March 2020. He is remembered as the first player on the Finnish national team to score a goal against Canada.

Saari died in Tampere on 29 April 2023, at the age of 94.
