= Ossi Kauppi =

Finnish ice hockey player

Ossi Ensio Kauppi (19 April 1929 in Tampere, Finland – 16 April 2000) was a Finnish ice hockey player who played in the SM-liiga. He played for Ilves and Tappara. Internationally he played for the Finnish national team at the 1952 Winter Olympics. He was inducted into the Finnish Hockey Hall of Fame in 1985.
