= Jorma Salmi =

Finnish ice hockey player

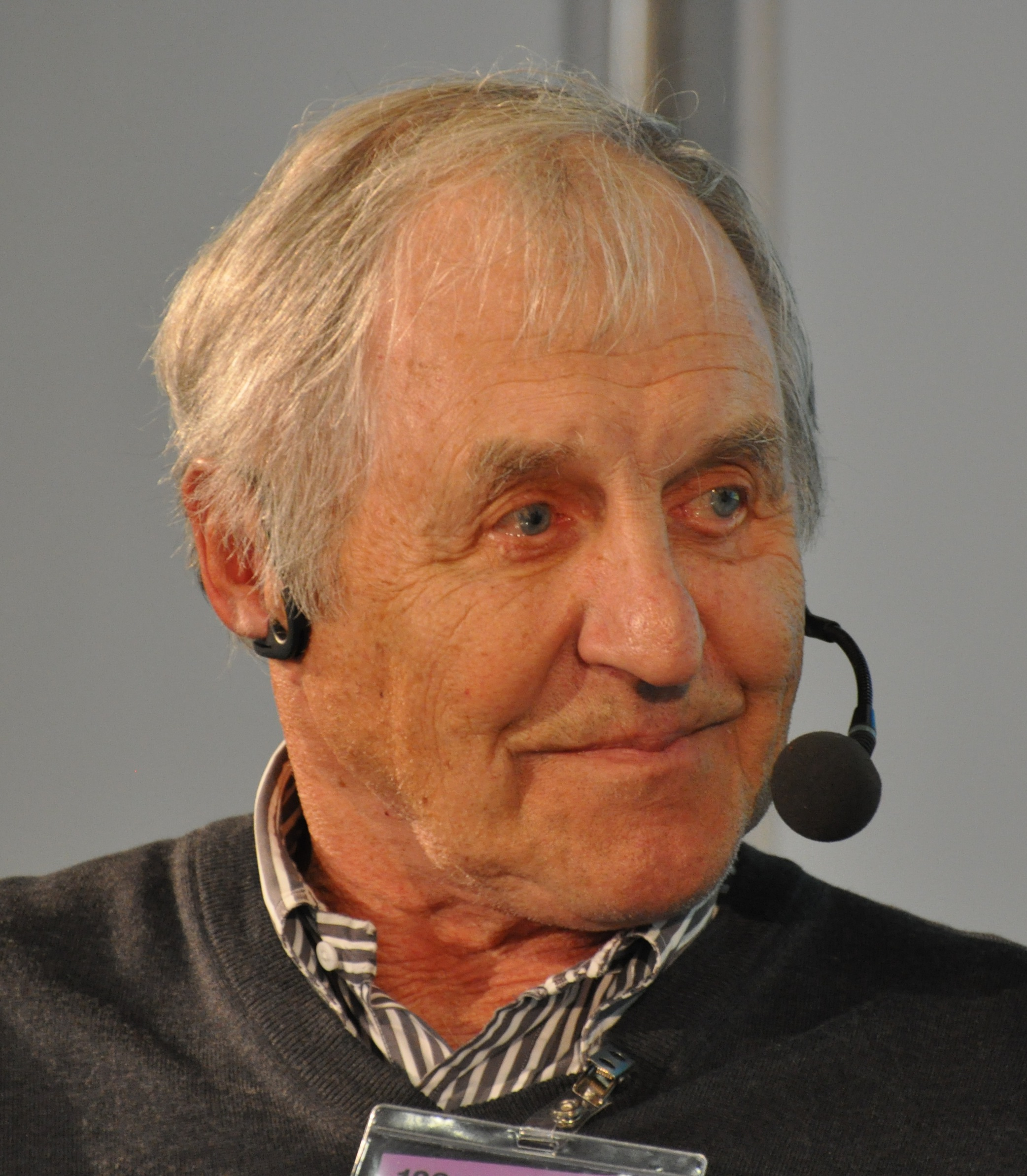
- Salmi in 2013
- Born: 6 May 1933 Kotka, Finland
- Died: 24 May 2016 (aged 83)
- Height: 5 ft 11 in (180 cm)
- Weight: 187 lb (85 kg; 13 st 5 lb)
- Position: Centre
- Shot: Left
- Played for: Ilves; HIFK; HJK; AIK IF; Västra Frölunda IF
- National team: Finland
- Playing career: 1955–1966

Jorma Salmi (6 May 1933 – 24 May 2016) was a Finnish professional ice hockey player. He played in the SM-sarja for Ilves, HIFK, and HJK and also played in Sweden's Division 1 for AIK IF and Västra Frölunda IF. He was inducted into the Finnish Hockey Hall of Fame in 2003. He was a member of the 1960 Finnish Olympic team. He moved to the United States and resided in the Chicago suburb of Buffalo Grove, Illinois.
