= Harry Lindblad =

Finnish ice hockey administrator, coach and player (1912–1984)

- Born: 30 July 1912; Vyborg, Grand Duchy of Finland
- Died: 2 February 1984 (aged 71); Tampere, Finland
- Known for: Finnish Ice Hockey Association president
- Awards: IIHF Hall of Fame; Finnish Hockey Hall of Fame

Harry Gustaf Lindblad (30 July 1912 – 2 February 1984) was a Finnish ice hockey administrator, coach and player. He served as the Finnish Ice Hockey Association president for 18 years, after five years as its vice-president. During this time, Finland participated in its first ice hockey tournament at the Winter Olympics, won its first medal in international hockey, began to build indoor ice rinks, hosted two Ice Hockey World Championships, and founded the Finnish Elite League. He was posthumously recognized for his contributions by induction into both the Finnish Hockey Hall of Fame and the IIHF Hall of Fame.

== Early life ==
Lindblad was born on 30 July 1912 in Vyborg, Grand Duchy of Finland. He was baptised Harry Gustaf Lindblad on 25 October 1912, to parents Gustaf Edvard Lindblad, and Margaretha Elisabeth Henriksson. The young Lindblad played ice hockey with Tammerfors Bollklubb (TBK) in the 1940s and later coached the team. He became president of TBK in 1945, and remained with the club when it transitioned into Tappara in 1955.

== Finnish national hockey ==
Lindblad served as vice-president of the Finnish Ice Hockey Association from 1952 to 1957. During this time, the Finland men's national ice hockey team participated in its first Winter Olympic Games and placed seventh in ice hockey at the 1952 Winter Olympics in Oslo. In 1956, Finland opened its first artificial ice hockey rink, located in Tampere.

He was elected president of the Finnish Ice Hockey Association in 1957, and served in that role for 18 years until 1975. During this time, the national team placed fourth in the 1962 Ice Hockey World Championships which also determined the 1962 European Ice Hockey Championship. Finland completed the event as the second-best European team overall, earning the European silver medal. He was successful in having the 1965 World Ice Hockey Championships awarded by the International Ice Hockey Federation (IIHF) to Tampere, and served as chairman of its planning committee. The 1965 event was the first time Finland hosted the Ice Hockey World Championships. This led to an era of growth, with more indoor rinks being built in Finland. Finland later hosted the 1974 Ice Hockey World Championships, with Lindblad helping coordinate the event as well. Also in 1974, Finland won a silver medal at the 1974 World Junior Ice Hockey Championships. In his last year as president, the Finnish Elite League was founded, which later became known as Liiga.

Lindblad was a member of the Finnish Olympic Committee from 1961 to 1976. He later served as a council member of the IIHF from 1967 to 1976, and was one of the first three people to be made an honorary member of the IIHF in 1975. When the Finnish Hockey Hall of Fame was established June 14, 1979, Lindblad was one of its founding members, and served as chairperson from 1979 to 1983.

== Later life and honors ==
Lindblad died on 2 February 1984, in Tampere. As a result of his contributions to the sport of hockey, he posthumously joined the Finnish Hockey Hall of Fame in 1985, and into the builder category of the IIHF Hall of Fame in 1999. He was later inducted into the Tappara Hall of Fame, and became the namesake of the Harry Lindblad memorial trophy, awarded to the regular season champion of Liiga.
