= Eero Salisma =

Finnish ice hockey player

Eero Johannes Salisma (16 December 1916 in Hämeenlinna, Finland – 19 July 1998) was a professional ice hockey player who played in the SM-liiga. He played for Hämeenlinnan Tarmo and HPK. He was inducted into the Finnish Hockey Hall of Fame in 1985.
