= Christian Rapp =

Finnish ice hockey player

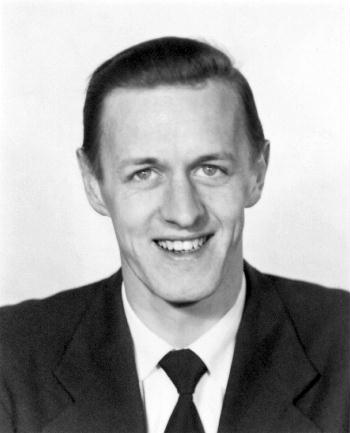
Image of Christian Rapp

John Christian Rapp (22 May 1928 in Helsinki, Finland – 4 July 2004) was a professional ice hockey player who played in the SM-sarja. He played for HIFK. He was inducted into the Finnish Hockey Hall of Fame in 1985.
