= Kalle Havulinna =

Finnish ice hockey player

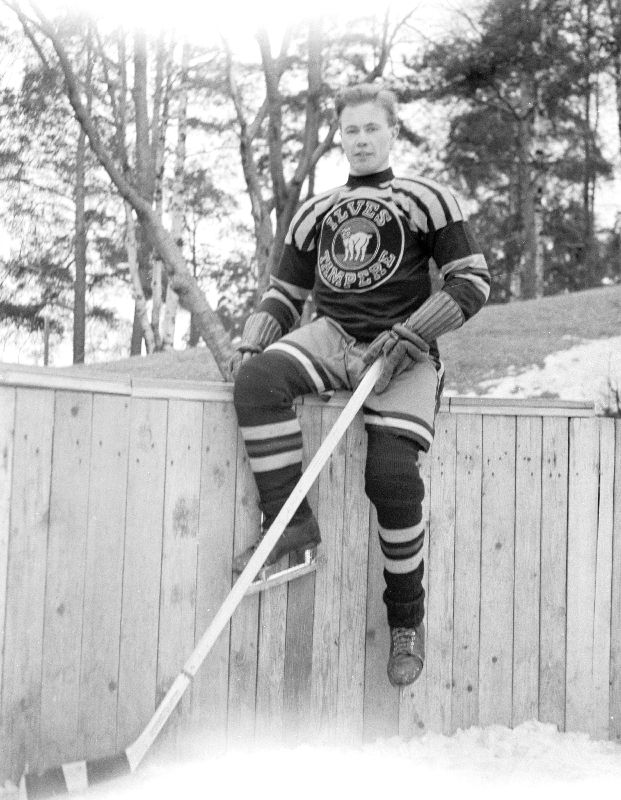
Kalle Havulinna in 1949

Kalle Havulinna (September 27, 1924 – July 9, 2016) was a Finnish professional ice hockey player who played in the top professional league in Finland, the SM-liiga. He played 10 seasons with the Tampere Ilves. He is included in the Finnish Hockey Hall of Fame. Besides ice hockey he worked as an electrical engineer. His company was responsible for the electrics of Finland's first ice rink in Tampere, built for the 1965 Ice Hockey World Championships.
