= Seppo Nikkilä =

Finnish ice hockey player

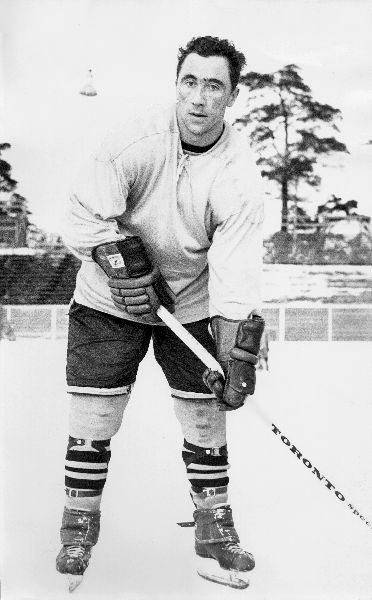
- Seppo Nikkilä in the 1960s
- Born: December 23, 1936 (age 88); Tampere, Finland
- Position: Forward
- Played for: KOOVEE
- National team: Finland
- Playing career: 1955–1969

Seppo Tapani Nikkilä (born December 23, 1936, in Tampere, Finland) is a retired professional ice hockey player who played in the SM-liiga. He played for KOOVEE. He competed in the men's tournament at the 1964 Winter Olympics. He was inducted into the Finnish Hockey Hall of Fame in 1986.
