= Seppo Ahokainen =

Finnish ice hockey player (1952–2024)

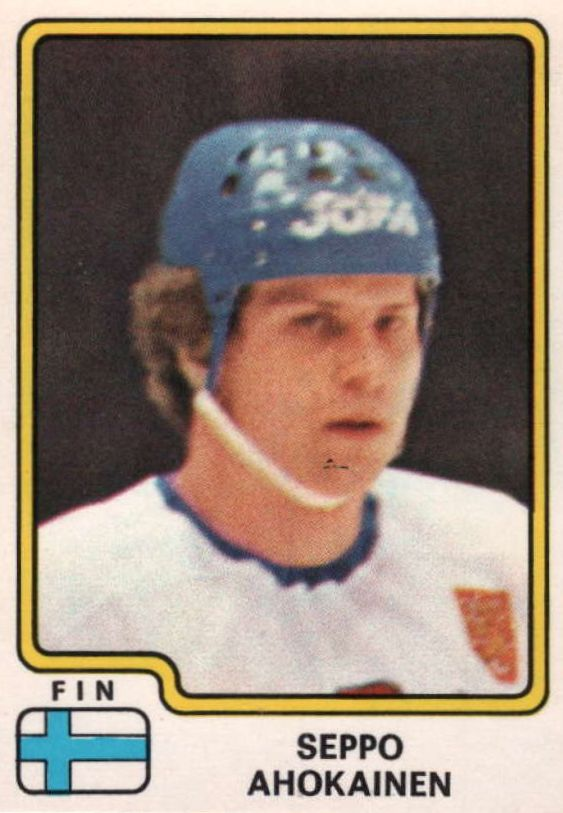
- Born: 19 January 1952; Lauritsala, Finland
- Died: 6 March 2024 (aged 72)
- Height: 5 ft 10 in (178 cm)
- Weight: 181 lb (82 kg; 12 st 13 lb)
- Position: Forward
- Shot: Left
- Played for: Ilves; Klagenfurter AC; Tappara
- National team: Finland
- Playing career: 1969–1987

Seppo Johannes Ahokainen (19 January 1952 – 6 March 2024) was a Finnish professional ice hockey player. who played in the SM-liiga for Ilves and Tappara as well for the Finland national team. He was inducted into the Finnish Hockey Hall of Fame in 1993. Ahokainen died on 6 March 2024, at the age of 72.
