= Jorma Suokko =

Finnish ice hockey player

- Born: May 27, 1940 (age 84); Tampere, Finland
- Height: 5 ft 8 in (173 cm)
- Weight: 168 lb (76 kg; 12 st 0 lb)
- Position: Defence
- Shot: Right
- Played for: KOOVEE
- National team: Finland
- Playing career: 1958–1975

Jorma Ilmari Suokko (born May 27, 1940) is a Finnish retired professional ice hockey player who played in the SM-liiga. He played for KooVee. He competed in the men's tournament at the 1964 Winter Olympics. He was inducted into the Finnish Hockey Hall of Fame in 1986.
