= Sakari Lindfors =

Finnish ice hockey player

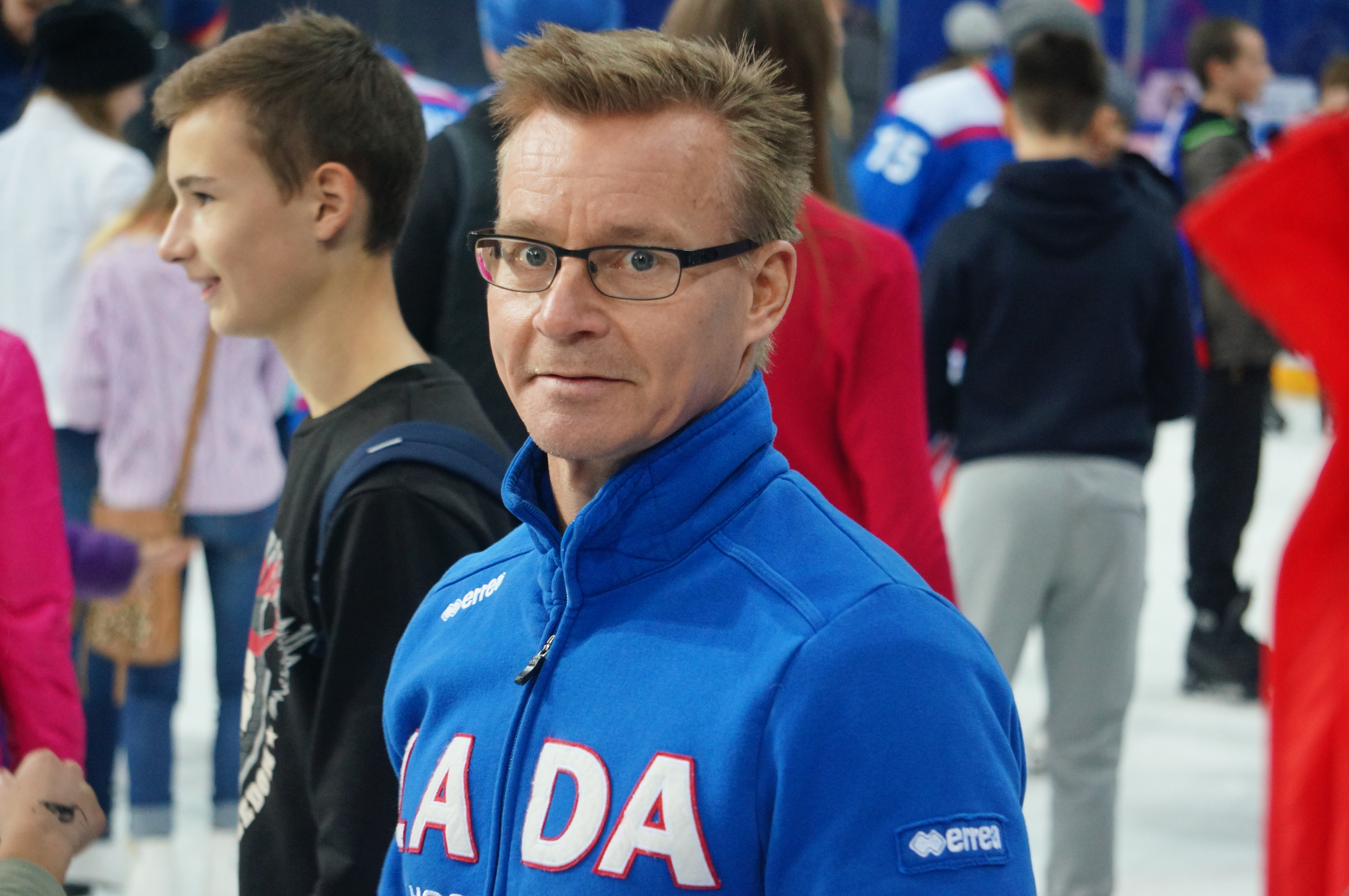
- Born: April 27, 1966 (age 59); Helsinki, Finland
- Height: 5 ft 7 in (170 cm)
- Weight: 154 lb (70 kg; 11 st 0 lb)
- Position: Goaltender
- Shot: Left
- Played for: HIFK; Graz 99ers Färjestad BK; Milano Vipers
- National team: Finland
- NHL draft: 150th overall, 1988; Quebec Nordiques
- Playing career: 1985–2002

Medal record

Representing Finland

Men's ice hockey

Olympic Games
Silver medal – second place	1988 Calgary	

World Championships
Silver medal – second place	1992 Czechoslovakia	

Sakari Lindfors (born April 27, 1966) is a Finnish former professional ice hockey player who played in the SM-liiga. He played for HIFK and had time abroad in Italian, Swedish and Austrian leagues. He was inducted into the Finnish Hockey Hall of Fame in 2005.
