= Jukka Wuolio =

Finnish ice hockey player

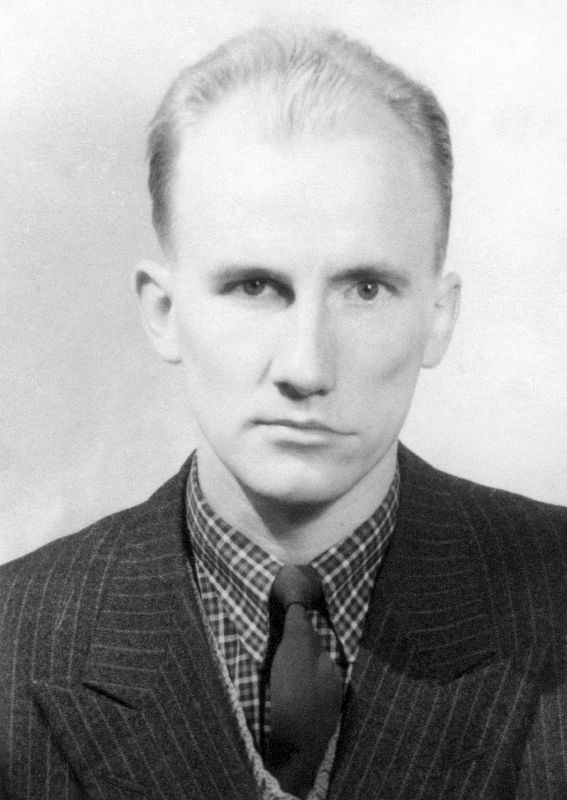

Personal information
- Nationality: Finnish
- Born: Jukka Sakari Wuolio; 5 March 1927 Tampere, Finland
- Died: June 27, 2001 (aged 74)

Sport
- Country: Finland
- Sport: Ice hockey
- League: SM-liiga
- Team: Ilves
Medal record
- Finnish Hockey Hall of Fame (1985)

Jukka Sakari Wuolio (5 March 1927 in Tampere, Finland – 27 June 2001) was a professional ice hockey player who played for Ilves in the SM-liiga. He was inducted into the Finnish Hockey Hall of Fame in 1985.
