= Kai Hietarinta =

Finnish businessman and ice hockey executive (born 1932)

- Born: 23 November 1932 (age 93); Helsinki, Finland
- Education: Hanken School of Economics; Helsinki University of Technology
- Occupations: Businessman; ice hockey executive
- Known for: Neste; Finnish Ice Hockey Association; Finnish Olympic Committee; International Ice Hockey Federation
- Awards: Finnish Hockey Hall of Fame; IIHF Hall of Fame

Kai Harri Hietarinta (Finnish pronunciation: [kɑi̯ ˈhɑrːi ˈhie̯rtɑrintɑ]; born 25 November 1932) is a Finnish businessman and ice hockey executive. His petroleum industry career as executive vice president of Neste involved him in Finland's international trade policy, and importing Soviet oil to reduce the trade surplus. Becoming the Finnish Ice Hockey Association president to resolve disputes, he used business connections to gain an advantage in international ice hockey. During his presidency, Finland increased its number of indoor ice rinks as hockey grew in popularity, and won its first international medals in men's, women's and junior hockey. He was also a Finnish Olympic Committee and International Ice Hockey Federation member, and was inducted into both the Finnish Hockey Hall of Fame and the IIHF Hall of Fame.

== Early life and education ==
Kai Harri Hietarinta was born on 25 November 1932, in Helsinki, Finland. He graduated from the Hanken School of Economics in 1950, then attended Helsinki University of Technology where he earned a Master of Science in Administration degree in business and economics in 1958, and a Master of Science in Information Technology degree in 1959.

== Business career ==
Hietarinta began working in the petroleum industry at Neste in 1960, the state-owned oil refining and marketing company of Finland. Working in management positions since 1964, he became executive vice president in the 1970s, serving under president Uolevi Raade. Through business he developed a network of contacts in North America, Russia, and the Middle East. His position involved him in both the energy policy of Finland and its international trade policy. He has sat on the board of directors of several additional companies, including the international advisory board of Dana Gas based in the United Arab Emirates.

When Finland became the Soviet Union's largest Western oil importer in 1983, Hietarinta explained by stating that "the Soviets are reliable suppliers", in light of the 1970s energy crisis. From 1980 to 1982, Soviet supply increased from 58 to 81 of Finnish oil imports. Hietarinta noted that importing oil was Finland's only means to reduce its trade surplus. Trade obligations to the Soviet Union originated with the terms of its Independence from Russia in 1917, and the Second World War reparations from the 1944 Moscow Armistice that ended the Second Soviet–Finnish War.

== Ice hockey career ==
Hietarinta was the Finnish Ice Hockey Association (FIHA) president from 1984 to 1997. He became president when the FIHA needed an outside person to resolve internal disputes. Along with his vice-president Kalervo Kummola, he used business connections to Finland's advantage for greater influence in international ice hockey, and created stability allowing the FIHA to focus on player development. During his presidency, Finland won its first Olympic ice hockey medal. The men's national team won its first Winter Olympics medal with a silver medal in 1988, and its first World Championship in 1995. The men's national junior team won gold at the 1987 World Junior Championships, and the women's national team won four bronze medals at the first four Women's World Championships. Finland increased its number of indoor ice rinks from 12 to more than 100, including Hartwall Arena constructed to host the 1997 Men's World Championships.

In a 2022 interview with Helsingin Sanomat, Hietarinta felt that "Finnish ice hockey began to succeed when a couple of hundred rinks were built around the country in ten years", and then "the sport became the largest and most popular in Finland". In 2025, he stated "For Finland, the ultimate highlight was winning the first World Championship 30 years ago" ... "That victory gave the country a real boost and self confidence", and "paved the road for the later success of Finland in ice hockey".

Hietarinta sat on the Finnish Olympic Committee from October 1984 to June 1993, was a board member for the Vierumäki Sports Institute from 1997 to 2001, and the Finnish Hockey Hall of Fame from 2000 to 2008. He was a council member of the International Ice Hockey Federation (IIHF) from 1990 to 1998, and chairperson of IIHF tournaments hosted in Finland. When IIHF president Günther Sabetzki retired in 1994, Hietarinta placed in an election to succeed him, losing to René Fasel of Switzerland by three votes. After retiring from the FIHA, Hietarinta was a Finnish Ice Hockey Foundation board member from 1997 to until 2015.

== Honors and awards ==
In 1998, Hietarinta was made an honorary life member of the IIHF, and inducted into the builder category of the Finnish Hockey Hall of Fame. In 2025, he was the fifth Finnish person to be inducted into the builder category of the IIHF Hall of Fame, receiving the honor at the medal presentation day of the 2025 IIHF World Championship on 25 May in Stockholm.
