= Pentti Lindegren =

Finnish ice hockey player (1939–2026)

Pentti Lindegren (18 December 1939 – 5 February 2026) was a Finnish ice hockey player and commentator.

== Biography ==
Lindegren was born in Hauho on 18 December 1939. During his career, Lindegren played in Finland in HIFK, the Finnish Championship series for Karhu-Kissat and the I division in Reippaa. He played seven seasons for HIFK from 1961 to 1965 and 1967. He played a total of 108 Finnish Championship games.

He played six games for the Finnish national team, including one World Championship in 1965.

From 1977 onwards, Lindegren worked as a sports journalist in ice hockey circles. His first position was to edit the Finnish Ice Hockey Association's periodical. Lindegren became popular for his commentary first for MTV3 in the 1990s on Hockey Night and NHL Power Week, and later for Canal+, especially in NHL games.

Lindegren died on 5 February 2026, at the age of 86.
