= Don Baizley =

Canadian sports agent

- Born: May 15, 1942; Kenora, Ontario, Canada
- Died: June 27, 2013 (aged 71); Winnipeg, Manitoba, Canada
- Occupation: Sports Agent

Don Baizley (May 15, 1942 – June 27, 2013) was a Canadian NHL player agent. Baizley died of lung cancer at the age of 71 in June 2013. During his career, he served as the agent for players such as Veli-Pekka Ketola, Heikki Riihiranta, Jari Kurri, Saku Koivu, and Teemu Selänne. He is Finnish Hockey Hall of Fame "Ice Hockey Lion" number 239.
