= Mauno Nurmi =

Finnish footballer and ice hockey player (1936–2018)

- Born: 23 December 1936; Turku, Finland
- Died: 12 July 2018 (aged 81)
- Occupation(s): football and ice hockey player
- Awards: Finnish Hockey Hall of Fame

Mauno Nurmi (23 December 1936 – 12 July 2018) was a professional football and ice hockey player who played in the SM-liiga. He played for TPS (ice hockey) and TPS (football). He was inducted into the Finnish Hockey Hall of Fame in 1986. He was born in Turku, Finland. In football, he played as a forward and made five appearances for the Finland national team between 1959 and 1966.

== Honours ==
HC TPS

- SM-sarja (1): 1955–56
