= Keijo Kuusela =

Finnish ice hockey player (1921–1984)

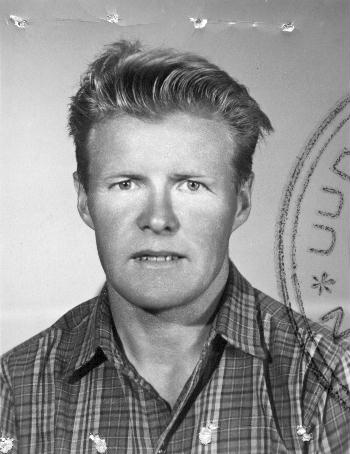

Personal information
- Born: 6 January 1921 Tampere, Finland
- Died: 27 April 1984 (aged 63)

Sport
- Sport: ice hockey; field hockey
- League: SM-liiga
- Team: Hämeenlinnan Tarmo

Keijo Helmer Kuusela (6 January 1921 – 27 April 1984) was a Finnish professional ice hockey player who played in the SM-liiga for Hämeenlinnan Tarmo. He was inducted into the Finnish Hockey Hall of Fame in 1985. He also competed in the men's field hockey tournament at the 1952 Summer Olympics.

Kuusela served as a fighter pilot in World War II, flying Morane-Saulnier 406 fighter. He shot down one Soviet P-39 Airacobra fighter in his last aerial combat before colliding with another and parachuting and becoming prisoner of war 1944.
