= Esko Kunnamo =

Finnish diplomat (1929–2014)

Esko Sulevi Kunnamo (29 May 1929 – 23 January 2014) was a Finnish diplomat.

Kunnamo was born in Viipuri and obtained a BSc degree. He was employed by the Foreign Service from 1967 and was Finnish ambassador to Kuwait and Abu Dhabi from 1985 to 1989 and to Lagos from 1989 to 1993. He died in Helsinki, aged 84.
