= Pentti Isotalo =

Finnish ice hockey player (1927–2021)

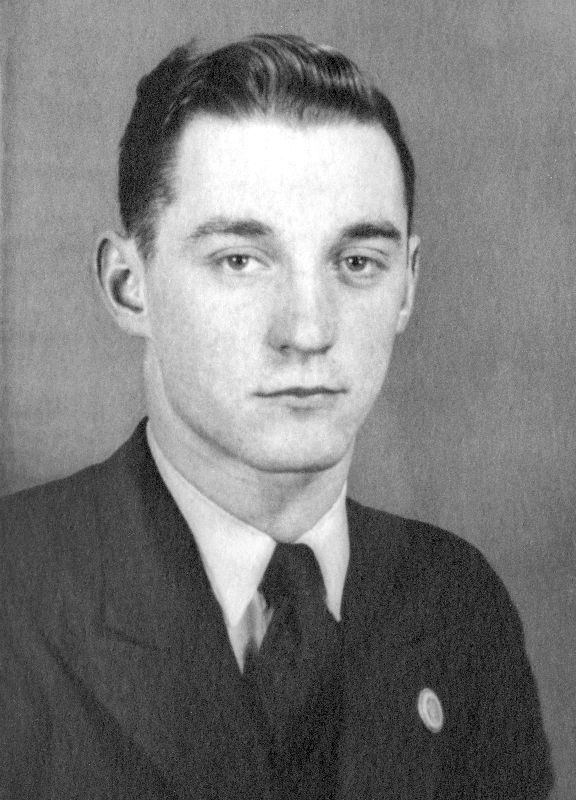

Pentti Veijo Isotalo (17 February 1927 – 9 July 2021) was a Finnish professional ice hockey player who played in the SM-liiga. He was born in Tampere, Finland, and played for Ilves. He was inducted into the Finnish Hockey Hall of Fame in 1985.
