= Juha Rantasila =

Finnish ice hockey player

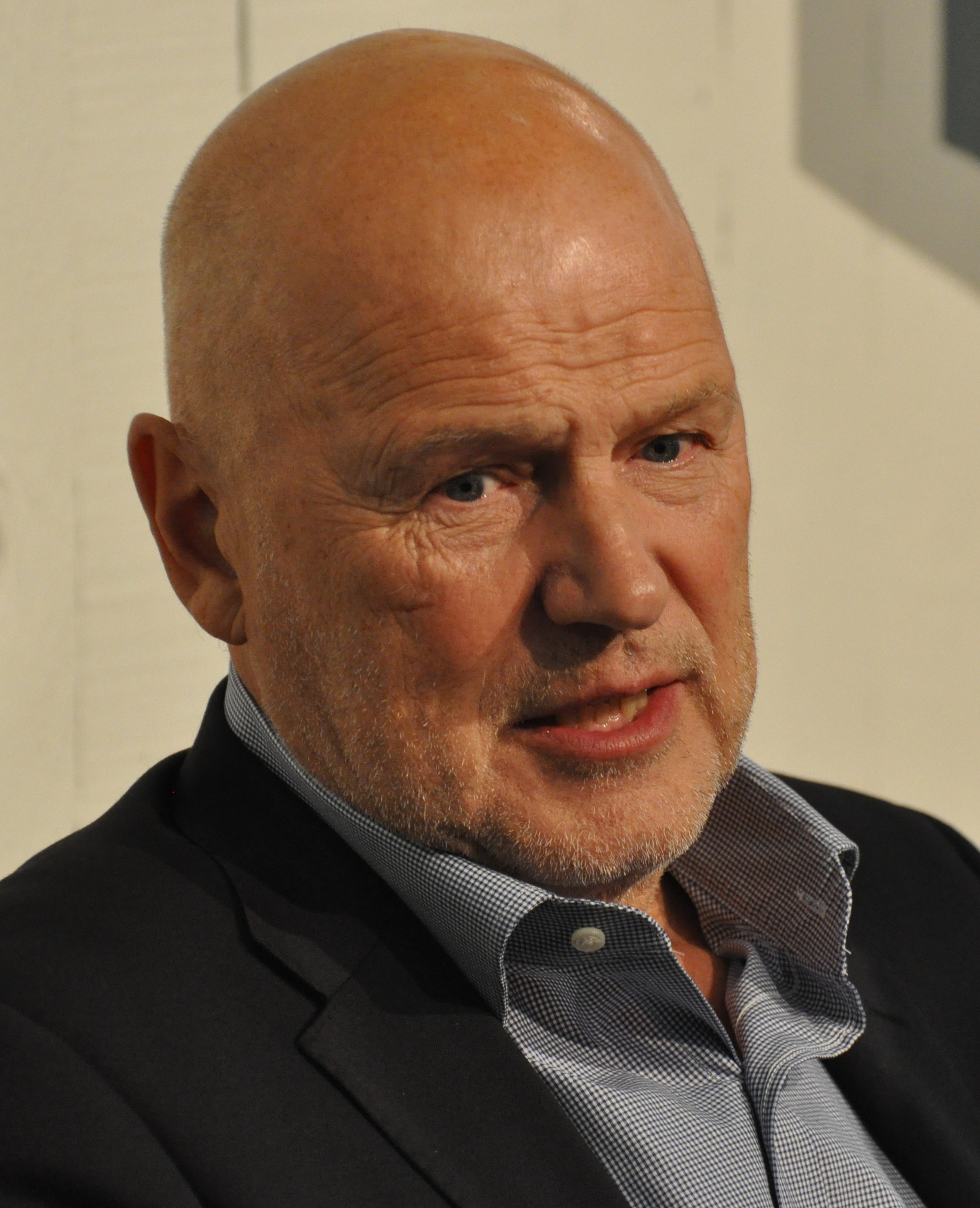
- Rantasila in 2013
- Born: June 5, 1945 (age 80) Pori, Finland
- Height: 6 ft 0 in (183 cm)
- Weight: 181 lb (82 kg; 12 st 13 lb)
- Position: Defense
- Shot: Left
- National team: Finland
- NHL draft: Undrafted
- Playing career: 1961–1975

Pekka "Juha" Rantasila (born June 5, 1945) is a Finnish former professional ice hockey player who played in the SM-liiga. He played for Porin Karhut and HIFK. Rantasila was inducted into the Finnish Hockey Hall of Fame in 1989. Currently, he works a lawyer.
