= Esko Rekomaa =

Finnish ice hockey player (1932–1985)

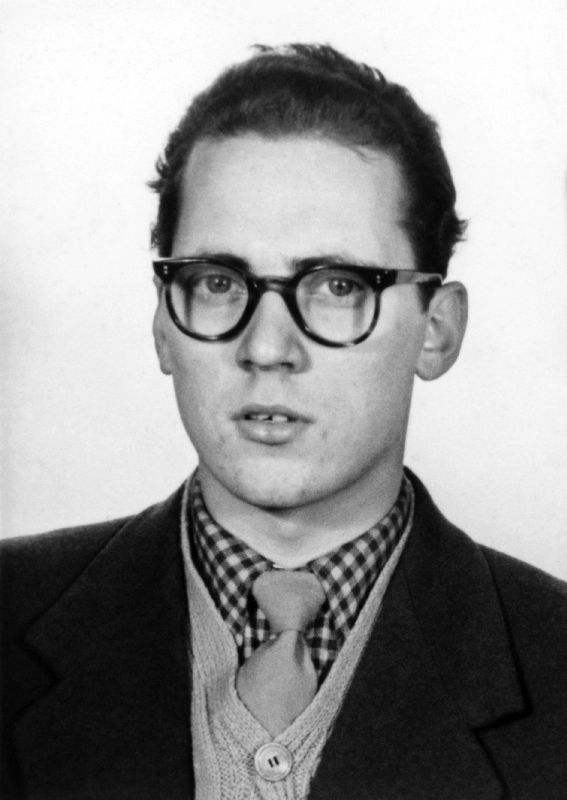
Esko Rekomaa

Esko Aatu Rekomaa (December 24, 1932 – February 14, 1985) was a Finnish ice hockey player who played in the SM-liiga. Born in Vuoksela, Finland, he played for HIFK. Internationally he played for the Finnish national team at the 1952 Winter Olympics. He was inducted into the Finnish Hockey Hall of Fame in 1986.
