= Esko Ranta =

Finnish footballer (born 1947)

Personal information
- Date of birth: 14 January 1947 (age 79)
- Place of birth: Tampere, Finland
- Height: 1.73 m (5 ft 8 in)
- Position: Left-back

Senior career*
| Years | Team | Apps | (Gls) |
| 1965–1969 | Ilves-Kissat | | |
| 1970 | PaPe Kuusankoski | | |
| 1971 | TPV Tampere | | |
| 1972 | TaPa Tampere | | |
| 1973–1984 | Haka Valkeakoski | | |
| 1986–1988 | PS-44 Valkeakoski | | |

International career
| 1969–1980 | Finland | 63 | (0) |
- * Club domestic league appearances and goals

Esko Ranta (born 14 January 1947) is a Finnish former footballer who played as a left-back, notably for Haka Valkeakoski. He made 63 appearances for the Finland national team from 1969 to 1980.
