= Pertti Valkeapää =

Finnish ice hockey player (born 1951)

Pertti Valkeapää (born 13 February 1951 in Tampere, Finland) is a retired professional ice hockey player who played for Tappara in the SM-liiga. He was inducted into the Finnish Hockey Hall of Fame in 1992.
