= Esko Tie =

Finnish ice hockey player

Esko Tie (26 December 1928 in Vanaja, Finland – 15 May 2002) was a professional ice hockey player who played in the SM-liiga. He played for Hämeenlinnan Tarmo and HPK. He was inducted into the Finnish Hockey Hall of Fame in 1994.
