= Finnish Ice Hockey Association =

Governing body of ice hockey in Finland

Finland
- Association name: Finnish Ice Hockey Association
- IIHF Code: FIN
- Founded: 20 January 1929
- IIHF membership: 10 February 1928
- President: Heikki Hietanen
- IIHF men's ranking: 4 (▲2) (3 June 2026)
- IIHF women's ranking: 3 (21 April 2025)

The Finnish Ice Hockey Association (Finnish: Suomen Jääkiekkoliitto, Swedish: Finlands Ishockeyförbund) is the governing body of ice hockey in Finland. Since the late 1980s, Finland has enjoyed a period of success on the international stage and, as of 2026, the men's national team is ranked fourth in the world and the women's national team is ranked third in the world by the IIHF. The Finnish Ice Hockey Association has heavily invested in youth development to produce world class ice hockey players.

== History ==
The former logo of the Finnish Ice Hockey Association.

In 1927, the Finnish Skating Association introduced ice hockey as part of its program and, through that organization, Finland joined the International Ice Hockey Federation (IIHF) in 1928. The Finnish Ice Hockey Association was formed on 20 January 1929 and featured seventeen clubs.

== National teams ==
- Finland men's national ice hockey team
- Finland men's national junior ice hockey team
- Finland men's national under-18 ice hockey team
- Finland women's national ice hockey team
- Finland women's national under-18 ice hockey team
- Finland men's national ice sledge hockey team

== Presidents ==
- Harry Lindblad, 1957 to 1975
- Kai Hietarinta, 1984 to 1997
- Kalervo Kummola, 1997 to 2016
- Harri Nummela, 2016 to 2024
- Heikki Hietanen, 2024 to present

== See also ==
- Finnish Hockey Hall of Fame
