= Japan at the 1980 Winter Olympics =

- IOC code: JPN
- NOC: Japanese Olympic Committee
- Website: www.joc.or.jp (in Japanese and English)

in Lake Placid
- Competitors: 50 (46 men, 4 women) in 10 sports
- Flag bearer: Osamu Wakabayashi
- Medals Ranked 15th: Gold 0 Silver 1 Bronze 0 Total 1

Winter Olympics appearances (overview)
- 1928; 1932; 1936; 1948; 1952; 1956; 1960; 1964; 1968; 1972; 1976; 1980; 1984; 1988; 1992; 1994; 1998; 2002; 2006; 2010; 2014; 2018; 2022; 2026

Japan competed at the 1980 Winter Olympics in Lake Placid, United States. The Team Consists of 50 athletes 46 were men and 4 were women.

== Medalists ==
Medal	Name	Sport	Event
Silver	Hirokazu Yagi	Ski jumping	Men's normal hill (K90)

== Alpine skiing ==
Men

Athlete	Event	Race 1		Race 2		Total	
Athlete	Event	Time	Rank	Time	Rank	Time	Rank
Mikio Katagiri	Downhill					1:49.77	21
Osamu Kodama	Giant Slalom	DNF	–	–	–	DNF	–
Atsushi Sawada	Giant Slalom	1:25.23	36	1:28.82	37	2:54.05	36
Toshihiro Kaiwa	Giant Slalom	1:24.29	35	1:24.49	28	2:48.78	29
Osamu Kodama	Slalom	DNF	–	–	–	DNF	–
Atsushi Sawada	Slalom	56.80	21	53.14	14	1:49.94	15
Toshihiro Kaiwa	Slalom	55.78	17	DNF	–	DNF	–

== Biathlon ==
Men

Event	Athlete	Misses ^{1}	Time	Rank
10 km Sprint	Masaichi Kinoshita	4	38:50.19	43
10 km Sprint	Takashi Shibata	6	37:26.91	37
10 km Sprint	Hiroyuki Deguchi	2	36:14.61	26

Event	Athlete	Time	Penalties	Adjusted time ^{2}	Rank
20 km	Tsusumisa Kikuchi	1'13:44.30	11	1'24:44.30	41
20 km	Hiroyuki Deguchi	1'14:53.16	7	1'21:53.16	39
20 km	Masaichi Kinoshita	1'14:21.46	2	1'16:21.46	28

Men's 4 x 7.5 km relay

Athletes	Race		
Athletes	Misses ^{1}	Time	Rank
Hiroyuki Deguchi; Masaichi Kinoshita; Takashi Shibata; Tsusumisa Kikuchi	7	1'45:53.98	13

^{1} A penalty loop of 150 metres had to be skied per missed target.
^{2} One minute added per close miss (a hit in the outer ring), two minutes added per complete miss.

== Bobsleigh ==
Sled	Athletes	Event	Run 1		Run 2		Run 3		Run 4		Total	
Sled	Athletes	Event	Time	Rank	Time	Rank	Time	Rank	Time	Rank	Time	Rank
JPN-1	Yoshimitsu Kadowaki; Yuji Funayama	Two-man	1:04.62	17	1:04.92	19	1:04.82	20	1:04.30	14	4:18.66	19

== Cross-country skiing ==
Men

Event	Athlete	Race	
Event	Athlete	Time	Rank
15 km	Shiro Sato	46:15.29	43
30 km	Shiro Sato	1'35:52.77	39
50 km	Shiro Sato	2'48:33.02	37

== Figure skating ==
Men

Athlete	CF	SP	FS	Points	Places	Rank
Fumio Igarashi	13	8	6	172.04	77	9
Mitsuru Matsumura	11	7	7	172.28	75	8

Women

Athlete	CF	SP	FS	Points	Places	Rank
Emi Watanabe	4	8	5	179.04	48	6

== Ice hockey ==
=== First Round - Red Division ===
Team advanced to the Final Round
Team advanced to Consolation round

Team	GP	W	L	T	GF	GA	Pts
Soviet Union	5	5	0	0	51	11	10
Finland	5	3	2	0	26	18	6
Canada	5	3	2	0	28	12	6
Poland	5	2	3	0	15	23	4
Netherlands	5	1	3	1	16	43	3
Japan	5	0	4	1	7	36	1

All times are local (UTC-5).

12 February 1980; 20:40	Japan	0 – 16 (0–8, 0–5, 0–3)	Soviet Union	Olympic Fieldhouse, Lake Placid

Referee:
Kompalla

0 – 1	03:42 - Starikov (Petrov, Mikhailov)
0 – 2	07:55 - Kharlamov (Mikhailov)
0 – 3	09:47 - A. Golikov (Makarov, Starikov)
0 – 4	12:19 - Fetisov (Petrov, Kharlamov)
0 – 5	14:59 - A. Golikov (Makarov)
0 – 6	17:30 - Balderis (Starikov, Zhluktov)
0 – 7	19:00 - V. Golikov (Makarov)
0 – 8	19:27 - V. Golikov (Fetisov, A. Golikov)
0 – 9	20:06 - Petrov (Kasatonov)
0 – 10	21:20 - Kasatonov (Mikhailov, Balderis)
0 – 11	24:20 - Makarov (V. Golikov, Vasiliev)
0 – 12	26:33 - Mikhailov (Starikov, Kharlamov)
0 – 13	38:06 - Fetisov (Mikhailov, Kharlamov)
0 – 14	46:26 - Zhluktov (Balderis, Skvortsov)
0 – 15	51:21 - Petrov (Pervukhin, Kharlamov)
0 – 16	54:49 - A. Golikov (Makarov, V. Golikov)

0 min
Penalties
2 min
17
Shots
67

14 February 1980; 20:00	Japan	3 – 6 (0–2, 2–2, 1–2)	Finland	Olympic Arena, Lake Placid

Referee:
Haley

	0 – 1	02:02 - Hakulinen (Peltonen) (PP)
	0 – 2	05:43 - Leinonen (Kiimalainen)
	0 – 3	22:47 - Leppänen (Hakulinen, Levo)
	0 – 4	33:36 - Leinonen (Leinonen, Porvari)
S. Misawa (Hori, Hanzawa) - 37:57	1 – 4
Honma (Hori, S. Misawa) (PP) - 39:59	2 – 4
	2 – 5	43:34 - Kiimalainen
Azuma (Matsuda) - 47:38	3 – 5
	3 – 6	51:11 - Leppänen (Levo, Peltonen)

6 min
Penalties
8 min
29
Shots
51

16 February 1980; 16:30	Japan	3 – 3 (3–1, 0–1, 0–1)	Netherlands	Olympic Arena, Lake Placid

Referee:
(Czechoslovakia) Vladimir Šubrt

Sakurai - 14:22	1 – 0
Urabe - 14:41	2 – 0
Urabe (Honma) - 14:41	3 – 0
	3 – 1	18:43 - van Gog (deGraauw)
	3 – 2	33:39 - de Cloe (deGraauw, Peternousek)
	3 – 3	57:15 - de Cloe (deGraauw, van Gog)

6 min
Penalties
8 min
23
Shots
27

18 February 1980; 13:00	Canada	6 – 0 (2–0, 2–0, 2–0)	Japan	Olympic Arena, Lake Placid

Referee:
Neagles

Devaney (Zupancich, d'Alvise) (PP) - 09:36	1 – 0
Primeau - 14:35	2 – 0
MacLean (Maxwell) - 23:17	3 – 0
Davidson - 26:19	4 – 0
W. Anderson - 41:27	5 – 0
Hindmarch - 50:22	6 – 0

14 min
Penalties
22 min
48
Shots
13

20 February 1980; 16:30	Poland	5 – 1 (3–0, 1–0, 1–1)	Japan	Olympic Arena, Lake Placid

Referee:
Lindgren

Zabawa (Małysiak, Janiszewski) - 03:03	1 – 0
Dziubiński (Kokoszka, Chowaniec) - 04:20	2 – 0
Małysiak (Jobczyk, Zabawa) - 11:37	3 – 0
Jobczyk (Małysiak, Zabawa) - 26:05	4 – 0
Pytel (Marcinczak, Ujwary) (PP) - 43:57	5 – 0
	5 – 1	54:50 - Fujii (Misawa, Hanzawa)

8 min
Penalties
12 min
53
Shots
12

Contestants; Minoru Misawa; Takeshi Iwamoto; Hiroshi Hori; Iwao Nakayama; Norio Ito; Hitoshi Nakamura; Tadamitsu Fujii; Koji Wakasa; Yoshiaki Kyoya; Katsutoshi Kawamura; Takeshi Azuma; Satoru Misawa; Mikio Matsuda; Sadaki Honma; Hideo Sakurai; Tsutomu Hanzawa; Hideo Urabe; Osamu Wakabayashi; Mikio Hosoi; Yoshio Hoshino

== Luge ==
Men

Athlete	Run 1		Run 2		Run 3		Run 4		Total	
Athlete	Time	Rank	Time	Rank	Time	Rank	Time	Rank	Time	Rank
Koji Kuriyama	45.820	26	45.872	17	45.852	18	45.538	18	3:03.082	19
Takashi Takagi	45.294	20	51.003	24	45.575	17	47.962	21	3:09.564	23

(Men's) Doubles

Athletes	Run 1		Run 2		Total	
Athletes	Time	Rank	Time	Rank	Time	Rank
Koji Kuriyama; Takashi Takagi	41.035	17	41.499	14	1:22.534	13

== Nordic combined ==
Events:

- normal hill ski jumping (Three jumps, best two counted and shown here.)
- 15 km cross-country skiing

Athlete	Event	Ski Jumping				Cross-country			Total	
Athlete	Event	Distance 1	Distance 2	Points	Rank	Time	Points	Rank	Points	Rank
Toshihiro Hanada	Individual	73.0	78.0	192.1	15	54:44.2	157.045	28	349.145	27
Michio Kubota	Individual	78.5	72.5	187.9	16	52:34.4	176.515	26	364.415	25

== Ski jumping ==
Athlete	Event	Jump 1		Jump 2		Total	
Athlete	Event	Distance	Points	Distance	Points	Points	Rank
Hiroyasu Aizawa	Normal hill	69.5	88.4	68.0	88.5	176.9	42
Takafumi Kawabata	Normal hill	79.0	111.1	71.5	96.1	207.2	29
Masahiro Akimoto	Normal hill	83.5	120.8	87.5	127.7	248.5	4
Hirokazu Yagi	Normal hill	87.0	128.9	83.5	120.3	249.2	2nd place, silver medalist(s)
Hiroyasu Aizawa	Large hill	95.0	99.2	93.5	96.1	195.3	35
Hirokazu Yagi	Large hill	96.5	103.3	105.5	116.9	220.2	19
Takafumi Kawabata	Large hill	102.5	111.2	90.0	90.2	201.4	32
Masahiro Akimoto	Large hill	104.0	113.8	108.0	120.9	234.7	10

== Speed skating ==
Men

Event	Athlete	Race	
Event	Athlete	Time	Rank
500 m	Kazuaki Ichimura	39.44	20
500 m	Kaoru Fukuda	39.24	14
1000 m	Kazuaki Ichimura	1:21.05	25
1000 m	Masayuki Kawahara	1:20.88	23
1000 m	Kaoru Fukuda	1:19.66	19
1500 m	Yasuhiro Shimizu	2:04.54	24
1500 m	Masayuki Kawahara	2:01.28	20
1500 m	Masahiko Yamamoto	2:01.25	19
5000 m	Masayuki Kawahara	7:42.18	25
5000 m	Masahiko Yamamoto	7:33.02	21
5000 m	Yasuhiro Shimizu	7:21.50	16
10,000 m	Masahiko Yamamoto	15:26.92	17
10,000 m	Yasuhiro Shimizu	14:57.48	9

Women

Event	Athlete	Race	
Event	Athlete	Time	Rank
500 m	Makiko Nagaya	42.70	5
1000 m	Yuko Yaegashi-Ota	1:30.72	25
1000 m	Makiko Nagaya	1:30.27	22
1000 m	Miyoshi Kato	1:28.97	17
1500 m	Miyoshi Kato	2:19.80	24
1500 m	Yuko Yaegashi-Ota	2:19.41	23
3000 m	Yuko Yaegashi-Ota	5:00.40	25
3000 m	Miyoshi Kato	4:57.39	21
