= Japan at the 1976 Winter Olympics =

- IOC code: JPN
- NOC: Japanese Olympic Committee
- Website: www.joc.or.jp (in Japanese and English)

in Innsbruck
- Competitors: 58 (50 men, 8 women) in 10 sports
- Flag bearer: Masaki Suzuki (speed skating)
- Medals: Gold 0 Silver 0 Bronze 0 Total 0

Winter Olympics appearances (overview)
- 1928; 1932; 1936; 1948; 1952; 1956; 1960; 1964; 1968; 1972; 1976; 1980; 1984; 1988; 1992; 1994; 1998; 2002; 2006; 2010; 2014; 2018; 2022; 2026

Japan competed at the 1976 Winter Olympics in Innsbruck, Austria.

== Alpine skiing ==
Men

Athlete	Event	Race 1		Race 2		Total	
Athlete	Event	Time	Rank	Time	Rank	Time	Rank
Mikio Katagiri	Downhill					1:50.03	27
Sumihiro Tomii	Downhill					1:48.88	20
Haruhisa Chiba	Giant Slalom	DSQ	–	–	–	DSQ	–
Masami Ichimura	Giant Slalom	DNF	–	–	–	DNF	–
Mikio Katagiri	Giant Slalom	1:54.68	45	1:58.05	38	3:52.73	37
Sumihiro Tomii	Giant Slalom	1:53.92	40	1:55.81	34	3:49.73	34
Haruhisa Chiba	Slalom	DNF	–	–	–	DNF	–
Mikio Katagiri	Slalom	DNF	–	–	–	DNF	–
Sumihiro Tomii	Slalom	1:07.69	34	1:10.98	28	2:18.67	29
Masami Ichimura	Slalom	1:02.35	10	DNF	–	DNF	–

== Biathlon ==
Men

Event	Athlete	Time	Penalties	Adjusted time ^{1}	Rank
20 km	Kazuo Sasakubo	1'21:35.31	6	1'27:35.31	41
20 km	Manabu Suzuki	1'19:35.79	7	1'26:35.79	38
20 km	Hiroyuki Deguchi	1'20:53.84	4	1'24:53.84	30

^{1} One minute added per close miss (a hit in the outer ring), two minutes added per complete miss.

Men's 4 x 7.5 km relay

Athletes	Race		
Athletes	Misses ^{2}	Time	Rank
Isao Ono; Hiroyuki Deguchi; Manabu Suzuki; Yoshiyuki Shirate	10	2'17:09.04	14

^{2} A penalty loop of 200 metres had to be skied per missed target.

== Bobsleigh ==
Sled	Athletes	Event	Run 1		Run 2		Run 3		Run 4		Total	
Sled	Athletes	Event	Time	Rank	Time	Rank	Time	Rank	Time	Rank	Time	Rank
JPN-1	Susumu Esashika; Kazumi Abe	Two-man	58.69	24	59.07	24	59.12	24	59.18	24	3:56.06	24
JPN-2	Rikio Sato; Kimihiro Shinada	Two-man	58.52	22	58.30	21	58.55	23	58.35	21	3:53.72	22

Sled	Athletes	Event	Run 1		Run 2		Run 3		Run 4		Total	
Sled	Athletes	Event	Time	Rank	Time	Rank	Time	Rank	Time	Rank	Time	Rank
JPN-1	Susumu Esashika; Kazumi Abe; Rikio Sato; Kimihiro Shinada	Four-man	56.47	18	56.97	21	57.78	19	58.19	19	3:49.41	18

== Cross-country skiing ==
Men

Event	Athlete	Race	
Event	Athlete	Time	Rank
15 km	Ryoji Fujiki	49:40.48	58
15 km	Kiyoshi Hayasaka	48:46.93	50
30 km	Ryoji Fujiki	1'42:59.25	57
30 km	Kiyoshi Hayasaka	1'41:33.76	55

Women

Event	Athlete	Race	
Event	Athlete	Time	Rank
5 km	Mikiko Terui	17:29.65	26
10 km	Mikiko Terui	33:25.81	30

== Figure skating ==
Men

Athlete	CF	SP	FS	Points	Places	Rank
Mitsuru Matsumura	16	12	11	172.48	99	11
Minoru Sano	9	7	10	178.72	79	9

Women

Athlete	CF	SP	FS	Points	Places	Rank
Emi Watanabe	11	12	15	171.72	118.5	13

== Ice hockey ==
=== First round ===
Winners (in bold) entered the Medal Round. Other teams played a consolation round for 7th-12th places.

Team 1	Score	Team 2
**Finland**	11–2	Japan

=== Consolation round ===
Rank		Pld	W	L	T	GF	GA	Pts
7	Romania	5	4	1	0	23	15	8
8	Austria	5	3	2	0	18	14	6
9	Japan	5	3	2	0	20	18	6
10	Yugoslavia	5	3	2	0	22	19	6
11	Switzerland	5	2	3	0	24	22	4
12	Bulgaria	5	0	5	0	19	38	0

- Romania 3-1 Japan
- Austria 3-2 Japan
- Japan 6-4 Switzerland
- Japan 4-3 Yugoslavia
- Japan 7-5 Bulgaria

**Contestants**; Toshimitsu Otsubo; Minoru Misawa; Hiroshi Hori; Iwao Nakayama; Hitoshi Nakamura; Kiyoshi Esashika; Takeshi Akiba; Koji Wakasa; Hideo Urabe; Yoshiaki Kyoya; Minoru Ito; Takeshi Azuma; Sadaki Honma; Hideo Sakurai; Tsutomu Hanzawa; Osamu Wakabayashi; Yasushio Tanaka; Yoshio Hoshino

== Luge ==
Men

Athlete	Run 1		Run 2		Run 3		Run 4		Total	
Athlete	Time	Rank	Time	Rank	Time	Rank	Time	Rank	Time	Rank
Kazuaki Ichikawa	56.252	29	55.502	30	55.400	33	55.288	29	3:42.442	27
Hidetoshi Sato	55.699	27	55.142	26	54.906	27	55.184	27	3:40.931	24

(Men's) Doubles

Athletes	Run 1		Run 2		Total	
Athletes	Time	Rank	Time	Rank	Time	Rank
Kazuaki Ichikawa; Masaaki Oyagi	45.176	18	45.407	19	1:30.583	18

Women

Athlete	Run 1		Run 2		Run 3		Run 4		Total	
Athlete	Time	Rank	Time	Rank	Time	Rank	Time	Rank	Time	Rank
Teruko Yamada	45.482	20	45.155	19	44.943	21	45.228	20	3:00.808	20
Mieko Ogawa	45.341	18	45.263	20	44.907	20	45.219	19	3:00.730	19

== Nordic combined ==
Events:

- normal hill ski jumping (Three jumps, best two counted and shown here.)
- 15 km cross-country skiing

Athlete	Event	Ski Jumping				Cross-country			Total	
Athlete	Event	Distance 1	Distance 2	Points	Rank	Time	Points	Rank	Points	Rank
Michio Kubota	Individual	74.0	74.5	196.3	15	56:39.45	142.31	32	338.61	30
Yuji Katsuro	Individual	75.0	76.0	209.8	5	54:15.75	163.87	29	373.67	21

== Ski jumping ==
Athlete	Event	Jump 1		Jump 2		Total	
Athlete	Event	Distance	Points	Distance	Points	Points	Rank
Koji Kakuta	Normal hill	74.5	104.5	76.0	105.9	210.4	29
Takao Ito	Normal hill	75.0	106.8	75.5	107.1	213.9	24
Hiroshi Itagaki	Normal hill	76.0	109.4	76.5	111.7	221.1	20
Yukio Kasaya	Normal hill	78.0	114.1	76.0	109.9	224.0	16
Minoru Wakasa	Large hill	86.0	90.4	84.0	87.1	177.5	29
Hiroshi Itagaki	Large hill	86.0	95.4	77.0	79.8	175.2	33
Takao Ito	Large hill	85.0	95.5	80.5	87.7	183.2	22
Yukio Kasaya	Large hill	86.0	95.9	86.0	96.4	192.3	17

== Speed skating ==
Men

Event	Athlete	Race	
Event	Athlete	Time	Rank
500 m	Mikio Oyama	40.90	18
500 m	Norio Hirate	40.85	16
500 m	Masaki Suzuki	40.22	11
1000 m	Norio Hirate	1:29.42	30
1000 m	Mikio Oyama	1:25.91	24
1000 m	Masaki Suzuki	1:23.40	19
1500 m	Masahiko Yamamoto	2:06.67	21
5000 m	Masayuki Kawahara	8:10.08	24
5000 m	Masahiko Yamamoto	8:06.97	22
10,000 m	Masahiko Yamamoto	16:20.83	16

Women

Event	Athlete	Race	
Event	Athlete	Time	Rank
500 m	Keiko Hasegawa	45.09	17
500 m	Makiko Nagaya	43.88	7
1000 m	Keiko Hasegawa	1:35.42	24
1000 m	Yuko Yaegashi-Ota	1:33.99	20
1000 m	Makiko Nagaya	1:31.23	9
1500 m	Yuko Yaegashi-Ota	2:25.74	24
1500 m	Chieko Ito	2:25.27	22
3000 m	Chieko Ito	5:02.57	21
3000 m	Yuko Yaegashi-Ota	4:58.92	19
