= Biathlon at the 1980 Winter Olympics – Relay =

Men's biathlon relay at the XIII Olympic Winter Games
- Venue: Lake Placid Olympic Sports Complex Cross Country Biathlon Center
- Dates: 22 February 1980
- Competitors: 60 from 15 nations
- Winning time: 1:34:03.27

Medalists
| 1st place, gold medalist(s) | | Soviet Union; Vladimir Alikin; Aleksandr Tikhonov; Vladimir Barnashov; Anatoly Alyabyev |
| 2nd place, silver medalist(s) | | East Germany; Mathias Jung; Klaus Siebert; Frank Ullrich; Eberhard Rösch |
| 3rd place, bronze medalist(s) | | West Germany; Franz Bernreiter; Hans Estner; Peter Angerer; Gerd Winkler |

The Men's 4 × 7.5 kilometre biathlon relay competition at the 1980 Winter Olympics took place on 22 February, at Lake Placid Olympic Sports Complex Cross Country Biathlon Center. Each national team consisted of four members, with each skiing 7.5 kilometres and shooting twice, once prone and once standing.

At each shooting station, a competitor has eight shots to hit five targets; however, only five bullets are loaded in a magazine at one time - if additional shots are required, the spare bullets must be loaded one at a time. If after the eight shots are taken, there are still targets not yet hit, the competitor must ski a 150-metre penalty loop.

== Results ==
The East Germans were the two-time defending world champions, while the defending Olympic champions from the Soviet Union had just one bronze medal to show from those two championships. Vladimir Alikin set the tone for the Soviets in the first leg, putting together the single fastest lap of the relay race, and giving his side a twenty second lead over the East Germans. The lead then expanded when Klaus Siebert struggled, needing a penalty loop on each of his two shooting rounds. At the halfway point, the Soviets were more than a minute ahead, and while the Germans cut down the lead over the last two legs, they were not able to get close. West Germany struggled early, Franz Bernreiter taking two penalty loops on the first leg, but strong legs from Hans Estner and Peter Angerer got them up to third, and with Norway's Odd Lirhus taking two penalties on the third leg, the West Germans were able to take the bronze.

| Rank | Bib | Team | Penalties | Result | Deficit |
|---|---|---|---|---|---|
| 1st place, gold medalist(s) | 13 | Soviet Union; Vladimir Alikin; Aleksandr Tikhonov; Vladimir Barnashov; Anatoly Alyabyev | 0+4 0+8; 0+1 0+1; 0+0 0+3; 0+0 0+3; 0+3 0+1 | 1:34:03.27; 22:40.71; 23:44.60; 23:48.36; 23:49.60 | – |
| 2nd place, silver medalist(s) | 11 | East Germany; Mathias Jung; Klaus Siebert; Frank Ullrich; Eberhard Rösch | 1+6 2+12; 0+0 0+3; 1+3 1+3; 0+1 0+3; 0+2 1+3 | 1:34:56.99; 23:03.85; 24:47.64; 23:01.26; 24:04.24 | +53.72 |
| 3rd place, bronze medalist(s) | 14 | West Germany; Franz Bernreiter; Hans Estner; Peter Angerer; Gerd Winkler | 0+4 2+11; 0+0 2+3; 0+1 0+3; 0+2 0+2; 0+1 0+3 | 1:37:30.26; 24:53.58; 24:31.97; 23:31.20; 24:33.51 | +3:26.99 |
| 4 | 8 | Norway; Svein Engen; Kjell Søbak; Odd Lirhus; Sigleif Johansen | 0+7 3+10; 0+2 1+3; 0+2 0+3; 0+0 2+3; 0+3 0+1 | 1:38:11.76; 24:52.10; 24:03.15; 24:08.66; 25:07.85 | +4:08.49 |
| 5 | 1 | France; Yvon Mougel; Denis Sandona; André Geourjon; Christian Poirot | 0+5 0+10; 0+0 0+2; 0+2 0+3; 0+2 0+2; 0+1 0+3 | 1:38:23.36; 23:30.07; 25:14.71; 24:44.46; 24:54.12 | +4:20.09 |
| 6 | 10 | Austria; Rudolf Horn; Franz-Josef Weber; Josef Koll; Alfred Eder | 0+3 4+8; 0+2 0+3; 0+0 4+3; 0+1 0+1; 0+0 0+1 | 1:38:32.02; 23:59.95; 25:56.99; 24:37.12; 23:57.96 | +4:28.75 |
| 7 | 7 | Finland; Keijo Kuntola; Erkki Antila; Kari Saarela; Raimo Seppänen | 0+5 6+10; 0+1 1+3; 0+2 3+3; 0+2 0+1; 0+0 2+3 | 1:38:50.84; 24:18.98; 25:04.17; 24:14.45; 25:13.24 | +4:47.57 |
| 8 | 4 | United States; Martin Hagen; Lyle Nelson; Donald Nielsen, Jr. Peter Hoag, Jr. | 0+5 0+8; 0+1 0+2; 0+2 0+3; 0+1 0+1; 0+1 0+2 | 1:39:24.29; 24:25.46; 24:43.61; 24:31.29; 25:43.93 | +5:21.02 |
| 9 | 9 | Italy; Arduino Tiraboschi; Adriano Darioli; Celestino Midali; Luigi Weiss | 2+8 0+7; 0+1 0+2; 0+1 0+2; 1+3 0+1; 1+3 0+2 | 1:40:20.79; 24:15.71; 24:27.55; 25:45.94; 25:51.59 | +6:17.52 |
| 10 | 6 | Sweden; Sven Fahlén; Per Andersson; Sören Wikström; Ronnie Adolfsson | 0+7 6+9; 0+3 3+3; 0+0 1+3; 0+2 0+0; 0+2 2+3 | 1:40:44.62; 25:46.60; 25:06.56; 24:11.80; 25:39.66 | +6:41.35 |
| 11 | 3 | Czechoslovakia; Josef Skalník; Jaromír Šimůnek; Peter Zelinka; Zdeněk Hák | 1+5 3+5; 1+3 0+2; 0+0 3+2; 0+2 0+1; 0+0 0+0 | 1:41:48.62; 24:31.88; 29:37.41; 23:55.70; 23:43.63 | +7:45.35 |
| 12 | 5 | Great Britain; Graeme Ferguson; Keith Oliver; Jim Wood; Paul Gibbins | 0+6 2+8; 0+2 0+0; 0+2 0+3; 0+1 2+3; 0+1 0+2 | 1:42:10.59; 24:43.63; 25:39.61; 26:47.14; 25:00.21 | +8:07.32 |
| 13 | 2 | Japan; Hiroyuki Deguchi; Masaichi Kinoshita; Takashi Shibata; Tsusumisa Kikuchi | 1+7 6+9; 1+3 0+2; 0+2 0+1; 0+2 5+3; 0+0 1+3 | 1:45:53.98; 25:22.57; 25:22.90; 28:07.32; 27:01.19 | +11:50.71 |
| 14 | 15 | China; Song Yongjun; Ying Zhenshan; Li Xiaoming; Wang Yumjie | 10+10 8+12; 0+1 0+3; 3+3 3+3; 2+3 2+3; 5+3 3+3 | 2:01:33.36; 27:06.27; 29:22.07; 30:39.59; 34:25.43 | +27:30.09 |
| | 12 | Argentina; Luis Ríos; Jorge Salas; Raúl Abella; Demetrio Velázquez | DNF | | |
