= Biathlon at the 1980 Winter Olympics – Individual =

Men's biathlon individual at the XIII Olympic Winter Games
- Venue: Lake Placid Olympic Sports Complex Cross Country Biathlon Center
- Dates: 16 February 1980
- Competitors: 49 from 18 nations
- Winning time: 1:08:16.31

Medalists
1st place, gold medalist(s)		Anatoly Alyabyev	Soviet Union
2nd place, silver medalist(s)		Frank Ullrich	East Germany
3rd place, bronze medalist(s)		Eberhard Rösch	East Germany

The Men's 20 kilometre individual biathlon competition at the 1980 Winter Olympics was held on 16 February, at Lake Placid Olympic Sports Complex Cross Country Biathlon Center. Each miss of the target cost two minutes, while hitting the outer circle cost one minute.

== Results ==
Anatoly Alyabyev had never had a major result on the international scene, but had a great debut at Lake Placid. He had only the 10th best ski time, but won as a result of shooting clear, the only man in the field to do so. Frank Ullrich had a spectacular ski performance, having the best time by more than 30 seconds, meaning his three penalties still left in him silver medal position. Eberhard Rösch took bronze with just two minutes in penalties; only Alyabyev skied under 1 hour 10 with less. World champion Klaus Siebert had a good ski time, but faced 6 minutes in penalties, and ended up 15th.

Rank	Bib	Name	Country	Ski Time	Penalties	Result	Deficit
1st place, gold medalist(s)	42	Anatoly Alyabyev	Soviet Union	1:08:16.31	0 (0+0+0+0)	1:08:16.31	–
2nd place, silver medalist(s)	37	Frank Ullrich	East Germany	1:05:27.79	3 (1+0+1+1)	1:08:27.79	+11.48
3rd place, bronze medalist(s)	4	Eberhard Rösch	East Germany	1:09:11.73	2 (2+0+0+0)	1:11:11.73	+2:55.42
4	13	Svein Engen	Norway	1:08:30.25	3 (0+2+0+1)	1:11:30.25	+3:13.94
5	16	Erkki Antila	Finland	1:07:32.32	4 (0+2+1+1)	1:11:32.32	+3:16.01
6	44	Yvon Mougel	France	1:08:33.60	3 (1+0+1+1)	1:11:33.60	+3:17.29
7	29	Vladimir Barnashov	Soviet Union	1:07:49.49	4 (2+0+2+0)	1:11:49.49	+3:33.18
8	7	Vladimir Alikin	Soviet Union	1:06:05.30	6 (1+3+2+0)	1:12:05.30	+3:48.99
9	10	André Geourjon	France	1:10:53.37	2 (0+1+0+1)	1:12:53.37	+4:37.06
10	45	Arduino Tiraboschi	Italy	1:11:06.05	2 (1+1+0+0)	1:13:06.05	+4:49.74
11	15	Ronnie Adolfsson	Sweden	1:08:10.90	5 (2+0+1+2)	1:13:10.90	+4:54.59
12	21	Sören Wikström	Sweden	1:08:13.34	5 (4+0+1+0)	1:13:13.34	+4:57.03
13	49	Sigleif Johansen	Norway	1:11:20.12	2 (0+0+0+2)	1:13:20.12	+5:03.81
14	30	Zdeněk Hák	Czechoslovakia	1:09:33.76	4 (2+0+1+1)	1:13:33.76	+5:17.45
15	27	Klaus Siebert	East Germany	1:07:48.71	6 (2+0+0+4)	1:13:48.71	+5:32.40
16	3	Keith Oliver	Great Britain	1:12:02.30	2 (0+2+0+0)	1:14:02.30	+5:45.99
17	8	Siegfried Dockner	Austria	1:10:35.28	4 (0+1+0+3)	1:14:35.28	+6:18.97
18	39	Heikki Ikola	Finland	1:10:02.16	5 (2+0+1+2)	1:15:02.16	+6:45.85
19	19	Adriano Darioli	Italy	1:10:11.22	5 (0+1+0+4)	1:15:11.22	+6:54.91
20	33	Denis Sandona	France	1:13:21.01	2 (2+0+0+0)	1:15:21.01	+7:04.70
21	14	Angelo Carrara	Italy	1:12:31.89	3 (2+1+0+0)	1:15:31.89	+7:15.58
22	36	Peter Zelinka	Czechoslovakia	1:09:36.40	6 (1+0+5+0)	1:15:36.40	+7:20.09
23	24	Odd Lirhus	Norway	1:07:39.41	8 (1+2+0+5)	1:15:39.41	+7:23.10
24	31	Alfred Eder	Austria	1:11:44.28	4 (2+2+0+0)	1:15:44.28	+7:27.97
25	46	Jim Wood	Great Britain	1:12:45.37	3 (0+0+2+1)	1:15:45.37	+7:29.06
26	38	Rudolf Horn	Austria	1:10:03.83	6 (0+3+1+2)	1:16:03.83	+7:47.52
27	23	Peter Angerer	West Germany	1:08:07.60	8 (3+2+1+2)	1:16:07.60	+7:51.29
28	5	Masaichi Kinoshita	Japan	1:14:21.46	2 (0+2+0+0)	1:16:21.46	+8:05.15
29	35	Alois Kanamüller	West Germany	1:11:34.80	6 (2+3+0+1)	1:17:34.80	+9:18.49
30	6	Gerd Winkler	West Germany	1:10:48.57	7 (3+0+2+2)	1:17:48.57	+9:32.26
31	40	Sven Fahlén	Sweden	1:09:49.23	8 (0+3+1+4)	1:17:49.23	+9:32.92
32	2	Raimo Seppänen	Finland	1:13:15.67	6 (0+2+1+3)	1:19:15.67	+10:59.36
33	18	Graeme Ferguson	Great Britain	1:12:53.98	7 (1+1+0+5)	1:19:53.98	+11:37.67
34	47	Urs Brechbühl	Switzerland	1:11:59.13	8 (1+2+0+5)	1:19:59.13	+11:42.82
35	28	Marjan Burgar	Yugoslavia	1:14:11.68	6 (0+4+0+2)	1:20:11.68	+11:55.37
36	1	Martin Hagen	United States	1:13:02.95	8 (0+4+4+0)	1:21:02.95	+12:46.64
37	17	Roland Burn	Switzerland	1:10:12.97	11 (0+4+1+6)	1:21:12.97	+12:56.66
38	25	Glen Jobe Jr.	United States	1:15:36.52	6 (1+0+0+5)	1:21:36.52	+13:20.21
39	20	Hiroyuki Deguchi	Japan	1:14:53.16	7 (1+0+2+4)	1:21:53.16	+13:36.85
40	22	Yuri Mitev	Bulgaria	1:11:58.06	10 (2+4+3+1)	1:21:58.06	+13:41.75
41	41	Tsusumisa Kikuchi	Japan	1:13:44.30	11 (6+1+1+3)	1:24:44.30	+16:27.99
42	12	Josef Skalník	Czechoslovakia	1:11:17.13	15 (1+5+2+7)	1:26:17.13	+18:00.82
43	48	Vladimir Velichkov	Bulgaria	1:09:57.24	18 (7+9+1+1)	1:27:57.24	+19:40.93
44	9	Ying Zhenshan	China	1:15:47.00	13 (3+5+3+2)	1:28:47.00	+20:30.69
45	34	Johnny Ruger	United States	1:12:30.80	21 (8+4+6+3)	1:33:30.80	+25:14.49
46	26	Wang Yumjie	China	1:17:49.77	16 (2+2+6+6)	1:33:49.77	+25:33.46
47	43	Luis Ríos	Argentina	1:34:26.50	21 (4+5+4+8)	1:55:26.50	+47:10.19
	11	Jorge Salas	Argentina	DNF			
	32	Raúl Abella	Argentina	DNF			
