= Mikio =

- Gender: Male

Origin
- Origin: Japanese
- Meaning: Different meanings depending on the kanji used

Mikio (written: 幹夫, 幹男, 幹雄, 幹郎, 巳喜男, 三樹夫, 三喜夫, 三喜雄, 美紀夫, みきお in hiragana or ミキオ in katakana) is a masculine Japanese given name. Notable people with the name include:

- Mikio Aoki (青木 幹雄; born 1934), Japanese politician
- Mikio Date (伊達 みきお; born 1974), Japanese comedian
- Mikio Endō (遠藤 幹雄; born 1967), Japanese composer, music arranger and producer
- Mikio Fujita (藤田 幹雄; born 1968), Japanese politician
- Mikio Hasemoto (1916–1943), American soldier and Medal of Honor recipient
- Mikio Hosoi (細井 幹雄; born 1949), Japanese ice hockey player
- Mikio Igarashi (五十嵐 三喜夫; born 1955), Japanese manga artist
- Mikio Ikemoto (池本 幹雄; born 1977), Japanese manga artist
- Mikio Itakura (板倉 幹夫; born 1941), Japanese sport shooter
- Mikio Katagiri (片桐 幹雄; born 1955), Japanese alpine skier
- Mikio Manaka (眞中 幹夫; born 1969), Japanese footballer
- Mikio Matsuda (松田 幹郎; born 1949), Japanese ice hockey player
- Mikio Mizuta (水田 三喜男; 1905–1976) Japanese jurist, educator and politician
- Mikio Narita (成田 三樹夫; 1935–1990), Japanese actor
- Mikio Naruse (成瀬 巳喜男; 1905–1969), Japanese film director, screenwriter and producer
- Mikio Oda (織田 幹雄; 1905–1998), Japanese athlete
- Mikio Oyama (大山 三喜雄; born 1955), Japanese speed skater
- Mikio Sakai (酒井 ミキオ; born 1970), Japanese singer-songwriter
- Mikio Sasaki (佐々木 幹夫; born 1937), Japanese chief executive
- Mikio Sato (佐藤 幹夫; 1928–2023), Japanese mathematician
- Mikio Shimoji (下地 幹郎; born 1961), Japanese politician
- Mikio Shirai (白井 幹夫; born 1950), Japanese keyboardist
- Mikio Yahara (矢原 美紀夫; born 1947), Japanese karate master
- Mikio Yamamoto (山本 幹男; born 1944), Japanese scientist
