= 1975 World Allround Speed Skating Championships =

WHAT I DO AFTER SINCE HIGH SCHOOL

1975 World Allround Speed Skating Championships for Men
- Venue: Bislett Stadium, Oslo, Norway
- Dates: 8–9 February
- Competitors: 32 skaters from 16 nations

Medalist men
1st place, gold medalist(s)		Harm Kuipers	NED
2nd place, silver medalist(s)		Vladimir Ivanov	URS
3rd place, bronze medalist(s)		Yuri Kondakov	URS

The World Allround Speed Skating Championships for Men took place on 8 and 9 February 1975 in Oslo at the Bislett Stadium ice rink.

== Classification ==
Rank	Skater	Country	Points Samalog	500m	5000m	1500m	10,000m
1st place, gold medalist(s)	Harm Kuipers	Netherlands	176.002	40.99 (3)	7:35.59 (3)	2:05.88 (5)	15:49.85 (6)
2nd place, silver medalist(s)	Vladimir Ivanov	Soviet Union	176.050	42.24 (20)	7:31.92 (2)	2:07.11 (11)	15:24.96 (gold)
3rd place, bronze medalist(s)	Yuri Kondakov	Soviet Union	176.382	41.10 (7)	7:38.42 (4)	2:05.62 (4)	15:51.33 (7)
4	Sten Stensen	Norway	176.572	42.06 (17)	7:31.72 (gold)	2:07.01 (9)	15:40.05 (2)
5	Masayuki Kawahara	Japan	176.787	41.49 (10)	7:43.23 (11)	2:05.56 (3)	15:42.42 (4)
6	Dan Carroll	United States	177.194	41.01 (4)	7:40.28 (6)	2:05.53 (2)	16:06.25 (10)
7	Amund Martin Sjøbrend	Norway	177.588	41.55 (12)	7:44.18 (12)	2:05.31 (gold)	15:56.99 (9)
8	Jan Egil Storholt	Norway	177.614	40.30 (gold)	7:45.57 (13)	2:06.25 (7)	16:13.47 (16)
9	Viktor Varlamov	Soviet Union	178.153	42.24 (20)	7:41.40 (7)	2:08.03 (13)	15:41.91 (3)
10	Aleksandr Vladimirov	Soviet Union	178.177	42.33 (23)	7:39.64 (5)	2:06.79 (8)	15:52.39 (8)
11	Göran Claeson	Sweden	178.312	41.04 (5)	7:42.13 (8)	2:07.34 (12)	16:12.24 (14)
12	Terje Andersen	Norway	178.962	41.38 (9)	7:47.36 (15)	2:07.05 (10)	16:09.92 (13)
13	Piet Kleine	Netherlands	178.986	42.64 (25)	7:43.15 (10)	2:08.03 (13)	15:47.08 (5)
14	Klaas Vriend	Netherlands	179.459	42.09 (18)	7:42.55 (9)	2:08.07 (15)	16:08.47 (12)
15	Colin Coates	Australia	180.452	41.91 (16)	7:47.64 (16)	2:09.32 (19)	16:13.41 (15)
16	Jan Derksen	Netherlands	181.222	42.80 (27)	7:46.42 (14)	2:10.32 (20)	16:06.80 (11)
NC17	Klaus Wunderlich	East Germany	130.599	41.54 (11)	7:50.86 (17)	2:05.92 (6)	–
NC18	Mike Woods	United States	132.488	41.25 (8)	8:03.25 (22)	2:08.74 (17)	–
NC19	Zhao Weichang	China	131.922	40.93 (2)	8:02.92 (21)	2:08.10 (16)	–
NC20	Lennart Carlsson	Sweden	133.325	41.62 (13)	7:59.62 (20)	2:11.23 (22)	–
NC21	Örjan Sandler	Sweden	133.881	42.90 (29)	7:52.08 (18)	2:11.32 (23)	–
NC22	Bruno Toniolli	Italy	134.077	41.77 (15)	8:08.17 (26)	2:10.47 (21)	–
NC23	Manfred Winter	East Germany	134.440	42.81 (28)	7:57.90 (19)	2:11.52 (24)	–
NC24	Jouko Salakka	Finland	134.572	41.69 (14)	8:07.55 (25)	2:12.38 (25)	–
NC25	Peter Lake	United Kingdom	134.966	42.18 (19)	8:05.86 (24)	2:12.60 (26)	–
NC26	Thomas Ovrend	Canada	135.745	42.25 (22)	8:10.72 (27)	2:13.27 (27)	–
NC27	Jan Miętus	Poland	136.896	42.66 (26)	8:16.13 (28)	2:13.87 (29)	–
NC28	Richard Tourne	France	137.392	42.54 (24)	8:24.29 (30)	2:13.27 (27)	–
NC29	Gus Katinas	Austria	137.682	43.39 (30)	8:16.45 (29)	2:13.94 (30)	–
NC30	Gaétan Boucher	Canada	139.164	43.52 (31)	8:28.01 (31)	2:14.53 (31)	–
NC31	Norio Hirate	Japan	139.240	41.08 (6)	8:50.27 (32)	2:15.40 (32)	–
NC32	Herbert Schwarz	West Germany	147.780	56.23* (32)	8:04.97 (23)	2:09.16 (18)	–

* = Fell

== Attribution ==
In Dutch
