= 1974 World Allround Speed Skating Championships =

International speed skating competition

1974 World Allround Speed Skating Championships for Men
- Venue: Ludwig Schwabl Stadion, Inzell, West Germany
- Dates: 9–10 February
- Competitors: 34 skaters from 18 nations

Medalist men
1st place, gold medalist(s)		Sten Stensen	NOR
2nd place, silver medalist(s)		Harm Kuipers	NED
3rd place, bronze medalist(s)		Göran Claeson	SWE

The World Allround Speed Skating Championships for Men took place on 9 and 10 February 1974 in Inzell at the Ludwig Schwabl Stadion ice rink.

== Classification ==
Rank	Skater	Country	Points Samalog	500m	5000m	1500m	10,000m
1st place, gold medalist(s)	Sten Stensen	Norway	173.150	41.93 (15)	7:23.55 (gold)	2:02.81 (6)	15:18.55 (gold)
2nd place, silver medalist(s)	Harm Kuipers	Netherlands	173.305	41.52 (11)	7:24.54 (2)	2:02.71 (4)	15:28.55 (2)
3rd place, bronze medalist(s)	Göran Claeson	Sweden	174.763	41.13 (6)	7:25.74 (3)	2:02.48 (2)	16:04.64 (14)
4	Aleksandr Tsygankov	Soviet Union	175.019	41.14 (7)	7:38.21 (9)	2:02.63 (3)	15:43.61 (5)
5	Hans van Helden	Netherlands	175.267	41.39 (9)	7:33.49 (6)	2:01.90 (gold)	15:57.90 (12)
6	Yuri Kondakov	Soviet Union	175.879	41.34 (8)	7:37.73 (8)	2:02.71 (4)	15:57.26 (11)
7	Vladimir Ivanov	Soviet Union	176.136	42.31 (20)	7:35.15 (7)	2:04.49 (9)	15:36.28 (3)
8	Asle Johansen	Norway	176.341	41.12 (5)	7:43.94 (15)	2:04.65 (10)	15:45.53 (6)
9	Jan Egil Storholt	Norway	176.921	40.74 (2)	7:50.32 (18)	2:04.29 (8)	15:54.38 (9)
10	Piet Kleine	Netherlands	177.060	42.47 (24)	7:39.05 (10)	2:03.56 (7)	15:49.96 (8)
11	Colin Coates	Australia	177.906	42.01 (17)	7:45.43 (16)	2:06.61 (16)	15:43.00 (4)
12	Aleksandr Vladimirov	Soviet Union	178.031	42.11 (18)	7:43.51 (13)	2:05.14 (11)	15:57.14 (10)
13	Örjan Sandler	Sweden	178.035	42.54 (25)	7:30.10 (4)	2:06.43 (14)	16:06.83 (15)
14	Jan Derksen	Netherlands	178.376	42.37 (22)	7:30.77 (5)	2:10.30* (27)	15:49.92 (7)
15	Klaus Wunderlich	East Germany	179.669	42.16 (19)	7:43.69 (14)	2:06.32 (13)	16:20.65 (16)
16	Franz Krienbühl	Switzerland	180.395	43.42 (30)	7:41.55 (11)	2:08.25 (23)	16:01.40 (13)
NC17	Mike Woods	United States	130.589	41.86 (14)	7:48.02 (17)	2:05.78 (12)	–
NC18	Shigeyuki Nemoto	Japan	131.045	41.45 (10)	7:51.02 (19)	2:07.48 (19)	–
NC19	Zhao Weichang	Canada	132.013	41.82 (13)	8:00.10 (22)	2:06.55 (15)	–
NC20	Gerard Cassan	Canada	132.609	41.54 (12)	8:07.56 (31)	2:06.94 (17)	–
NC21	Herbert Schwarz	West Germany	132.944	41.99 (16)	8:03.77 (26)	2:07.73 (21)	–
NC22	Andrzej Zawadzki	Poland	133.118	42.35 (21)	7:57.21 (20)	2:09.14 (24)	–
NC23	Greg Berg	United States	133.200	42.42 (23)	8:02.40 (24)	2:07.62 (20)	–
NC24	Peter Lake	United Kingdom	133.632	42.63 (27)	8:05.25 (27)	2:07.43 (18)	–
NC25	Masaki Suzuki	Japan	133.871	40.00 (gold)	8:32.21 (33)	2:07.95 (22)	–
NC26	Jouko Salakka	Finland	134.241	42.60 (26)	8:00.88 (23)	2:10.66 (28)	–
NC27	Peter Mueller	United States	135.111	40.75 (3)	8:33.11 (34)	2:09.15 (25)	–
NC28	Richard Tourne	France	135.619	43.04 (28)	8:07.36 (30)	2:11.53 (30)	–
NC29	He Qinsheng	China	135.629	43.27 (29)	8:06.49 (28)	2:11.13 (29)	–
NC30	Gus Katinas	Austria	135.860	44.06 (31)	7:58.87 (21)	2:11.74 (31)	–
NC31	Tapani Renko	Finland	137.061	44.41 (32)	8:06.94 (29)	2:11.87 (32)	–
NC32	Gilbert Van Eesbeeck	Belgium	138.570	44.61 (33)	8:12.67 (32)	2:14.08 (33)	–
NC33	Floriano Martello	Italy	149.873	58.31* (34)	8:02.40 (24)	2:09.97 (26)	–
NC	Amund Martin Sjøbrend	Norway	87.010	40.82 (4)	7:41.90 (12)	DNS	–

*= Fell

== Attribution ==
In Dutch
