= Czechoslovakia at the 1980 Winter Olympics =

- IOC code: TCH
- NOC: Czechoslovak Olympic Committee

in Lake Placid
- Competitors: 41 (34 men, 7 women) in 7 sports
- Flag bearer: Bohuslav Ebermann (ice hockey)
- Medals: Gold 0 Silver 0 Bronze 1 Total 1

Winter Olympics appearances (overview)
- 1924; 1928; 1932; 1936; 1948; 1952; 1956; 1960; 1964; 1968; 1972; 1976; 1980; 1984; 1988; 1992

Other related appearances
- Czech Republic (1994–pres.); Slovakia (1994–pres.)

Czechoslovakia competed at the 1980 Winter Olympics in Lake Placid, United States.

== Medalists ==
Medal	Name	Sport	Event	Date
Bronze	Květa Jeriová	Cross-country skiing	Women's 5 km	15 February

== Alpine skiing ==
Men

Athlete	Event	Race 1		Race 2		Total	
Athlete	Event	Time	Rank	Time	Rank	Time	Rank
Bohumír Zeman	Downhill					1:48.65	13
Bohumír Zeman	Giant Slalom	1:22.25	22	1:23.71	20	2:45.96	19
Bohumír Zeman	Slalom	56.56	20	52.31	12	1:48.87	14

Women

Athlete	Event	Race 1		Race 2		Total	
Athlete	Event	Time	Rank	Time	Rank	Time	Rank
Jana Šoltýsová-Gantnerová	Downhill					1:40.71	10
Jana Šoltýsová-Gantnerová	Giant Slalom	1:18.60	25	1:31.05	22	2:49.65	21
Jana Šoltýsová-Gantnerová	Slalom	DNF	–	–	–	DNF	–

== Biathlon ==
Men

Event	Athlete	Misses ^{1}	Time	Rank
10 km Sprint	Zdeněk Hák	6	36:32.59	29
10 km Sprint	Jaromír Šimůnek	2	35:15.12	16
10 km Sprint	Peter Zelinka	1	33:45.20	6

Event	Athlete	Time	Penalties	Adjusted time ^{2}	Rank
20 km	Josef Skalník	1'11:17.13	15	1'26:17.13	42
20 km	Peter Zelinka	1'09:36.40	6	1'15:36.40	22
20 km	Zdeněk Hák	1'09:33.76	4	1'13:33.76	14

Men's 4 x 7.5 km relay

Athletes	Race		
Athletes	Misses ^{1}	Time	Rank
Josef Skalník; Jaromír Šimůnek; Peter Zelinka; Zdeněk Hák	4	1'41:48.62	11

^{1} A penalty loop of 150 metres had to be skied per missed target.
^{2} One minute added per close miss (a hit in the outer ring), two minutes added per complete miss.

== Cross-country skiing ==
Men

Event	Athlete	Race	
Event	Athlete	Time	Rank
15 km	Miloš Bečvář	46:18.13	44
15 km	František Šimon	45:12.09	40
15 km	Jiří Beran	44:27.78	24
15 km	Jiří Švub	44:20.15	23
30 km	František Šimon	1'35:32.70	36
30 km	Miloš Bečvář	1'34:08.79	32
30 km	Jiří Švub	1'33:12.73	28
30 km	Jiří Beran	1'31:46.11	21
50 km	Jiří Švub	2'40:53.94	30
50 km	František Šimon	2'39:53.03	27
50 km	Jiří Beran	2'37:51.58	23

Men's 4 × 10 km relay

Athletes	Race	
Athletes	Time	Rank
František Šimon; Miloš Bečvář; Jiří Švub; Jiří Beran	2'04:18.66	9

Women

Event	Athlete	Race	
Event	Athlete	Time	Rank
5 km	Blanka Paulů	16:30.04	30
5 km	Gabriela Svobodová-Sekajová	16:01.41	20
5 km	Dagmar Palečková-Švubová	15:48.78	13
5 km	Květa Jeriová	15:23.44	3rd place, bronze medalist(s)
10 km	Blanka Paulů	33:08.31	29
10 km	Gabriela Svobodová-Sekajová	32:23.05	19
10 km	Dagmar Palečková-Švubová	32:03.32	16
10 km	Květa Jeriová	31:29.55	9

Women's 4 × 5 km relay

Athletes	Race	
Athletes	Time	Rank
Dagmar Palečková-Švubová; Gabriela Svobodová-Sekajová; Blanka Paulů; Květa Jeriová	1'04:31.39	4

== Figure skating ==
Ice Dancing

Athletes	CD	FD	Points	Places	Rank
Liliana Řeháková; Stanislav Drastich	4	4	198.02	39	4

== Ice hockey ==
=== First round - Blue Division ===
Team advanced to the Final Round
Team advanced to Consolation round

Team	GP	W	L	T	GF	GA	Pts
Sweden	5	4	0	1	26	7	9
United States	5	4	0	1	25	10	9
Czechoslovakia	5	3	2	0	34	16	6
Romania	5	1	3	1	13	29	3
West Germany	5	1	4	0	21	30	2
Norway	5	0	4	1	9	36	1

All times are local (UTC-5).

12 February 1980; 13:16	Czechoslovakia	11 – 0 (0–0, 5–0, 6–0)	Norway	Olympic Arena, Lake Placid

Referee:
(Finland) Karl-Gustav Kaisla

Pouzar (Lukáč, Fryčer) - 25:33	1 – 0
Nový (Lukáč, Chalupa) - 31:11	2 – 0
M. Šťastný (P. Šťastný) - 33:00	3 – 0
Martinec (Chalupa, Novák) - 34:13	4 – 0
Ebermann (Novák, Chalupa) (PP) - 38:01	5 – 0
Pouzar (Nový, Lukáč) - 42:13	6 – 0
A. Šťastný (P. Šťastný, Ďuriš) - 43:16	7 – 0
Ebermann (Dvořák, Martinec) (PP) - 45:54	8 – 0
P. Šťastný (Bubla, M. Šťastný) - 48:33	9 – 0
Nový (Kadlec, Lukáč) - 52:51	10 – 0
P. Šťastný (M. Šťastný) - 54:47	11 – 0

10 min
Penalties
10 min
44
Shots
10

14 February 1980; 20:30	United States	7 – 3 (2–2, 2–0, 3–1)	Czechoslovakia	Olympic Fieldhouse, Lake Placid

Referee:
Lindgren

	0 – 1	02:23 - Pouzar (Kaberle, Nový)
Eruzione (Broten) - 4:39	1 – 1
Pavelich (Schneider, Harrington) - 5:45	2 – 1
	2 – 2	12:07 - M. Šťastný (P. Šťastný)
Schneider (Pavelich) - 24:33	3 – 2
Johnson (McClanahan) - 35:28	4 – 2
Verchota (Christian) - 42:59	5 – 2
Schneider (Harrington) - 43:59	6 – 2
	6 – 3	45:36 - Novák (Lukáč)
McClanahan (Johnson) - 50:54	7 – 3

10 min
Penalties
10 min
27
Shots
31

16 February 1980; 13:00	Romania	2 – 7 (0–2, 1–3, 1–2)	Czechoslovakia	Olympic Fieldhouse, Lake Placid

Referee:
(West Germany) Josef Kompalla

	0 – 1	13:35 - P. Šťastný (Bubla, A. Šťastný)
	0 – 2	19:00 - Lukáč (Nový, Pouzar)
Cazacu (Halauca, Sólyom) - 21:39	1 – 2
	1 – 3	26:07 - Kadlec
	1 – 4	28:43 - Nový (Pouzar, Kaberle)
	1 – 5	33:41 - P. Šťastný
	1 – 6	41:46 - Lukáč (Neliba)
Cazacu (Gall) - 44:08	2 – 6
	2 – 7	45:46 - Pouzar (Lukáč, Nový)

6 min
Penalties
2 min
29
Shots
45

18 February 1980; 20:00	West Germany	3 – 11 (1–5, 0–5, 2–1)	Czechoslovakia	Olympic Arena, Lake Placid

Referee:
(Finland) Karl-Gustav Kaisla

	0 – 1	01:33 - Nový (Ebermann) (PP)
	0 – 2	02:28 - P. Šťastný (A. Šťastný, M. Šťastný)
	0 – 3	05:45 - P. Šťastný (M. Šťastný) (SH)
Krüll (Truntschka, Kretschmer) - 19:04	1 – 3
	1 – 4	19:32 - Pouzar (Kaberle, Nový)
	1 – 5	19:49 - A. Šťastný (P. Šťastný)
	1 – 6	22:17 - Nový (Lukáč)
	1 – 7	27:10 - Pouzar (Fryčer, Nový)
	1 – 8	33:30 - Pouzar
	1 – 9	38:36 - Ebermann (Novák)
	1 – 10	39:22 - Nový (Pouzar)
M. Hinterstocker (Zach, Auhuber) - 46:28	2 – 10
Höfner (Kuhl, Philipp) - 48:36	3 – 10
	3 – 11	50:22 - P. Šťastný (M. Šťastný)

20 min
Penalties
19 min
22
Shots
39

20 February 1980; 13:30	Czechoslovakia	2 – 4 (0–2, 0–1, 2–1)	Sweden	Olympic Fieldhouse, Lake Placid

Referee:
(Finland) Karl-Gustav Kaisla

	0 – 1	09:18 - Åhlberg (Näslund, Holmgren) (PP)
	0 – 2	10:55 - Holmgren (Näslund, Weinstock)
	0 – 3	36:02 - Näslund (Söderström) (PP)
Nový (Pouzar) - 52:05	1 – 3
	1 – 4	57:00 - Lundqvist (Näslund, Jonsson)
Pouzar (Nový, Kadlec) (PP) - 59:22	2 – 4

6 min
Penalties
10 min
43
Shots
26

=== Consolation round ===
The third-placed teams in each division, Czechoslovakia and Canada, played each other to determine fifth place.

22 February 1980; 13:30	Czechoslovakia	6 – 1 (5–0, 0–1, 1–0)	Canada	Olympic Fieldhouse, Lake Placid

Referee:
Dombrovsky

Fryčer (Nový, Pouzar) - 01:38	1 – 0
A. Šťastný - 02:14	2 – 0
M. Šťastný, Bubla, A. Šťastný) - 07:16	3 – 0
A. Šťastný (M. Šťastný, P. Šťastný) - 12:47	4 – 0
M. Šťastný (A. Šťastný, P. Šťastný) - 13:19	5 – 0
	5 – 1	28:01 - Devaney (Grant, Hindmarch)
M. Šťastný (P. Šťastný) - 57:18	6 – 1

8 min
Penalties
6 min
27
Shots
21

Final Rank: 5th place

=== Leading scorers ===
Rank	Player	GP	G	A	Pts
1st	Milan Nový	6	7	8	15
2nd	Peter Šťastný	6	7	7	14
3rd	Jaroslav Pouzar	6	8	5	13
8th	Marián Šťastný	6	5	6	11

- Team Roster:
- Jiří Králík
- Karel Lang
- Jan Neliba
- Vítězslav Ďuriš
- Milan Chalupa
- Arnold Kadlec
- Miroslav Dvořák
- František Kaberle
- Jiří Bubla
- Milan Nový
- Jiři Novák
- Miroslav Fryčer
- Marián Šťastný
- Anton Šťastný
- Vincent Lukáč
- Karel Holý
- Jaroslav Pouzar
- Bohuslav Ebermann
- Vladimír Martinec
- Peter Šťastný

== Luge ==
Men

Athlete	Run 1		Run 2		Run 3		Run 4		Total	
Athlete	Time	Rank	Time	Rank	Time	Rank	Time	Rank	Time	Rank
Jindřich Zeman	44.901	15	45.438	16	45.571	16	45.025	12	3:00.935	10
Vladimír Resl	44.255	12	DNF	–	–	–	–	–	DNF	–

(Men's) doubles

Athletes	Run 1		Run 2		Total	
Athletes	Time	Rank	Time	Rank	Time	Rank
Jindřich Zeman; Vladimír Resl	40.050	10	40.092	4	1:20.142	8

Women

Athlete	Run 1		Run 2		Run 3		Run 4		Total	
Athlete	Time	Rank	Time	Rank	Time	Rank	Time	Rank	Time	Rank
Mária Jasenčáková	39.698	11	39.862	8	39.606	10	39.963	10	2:39.429	9

== Ski jumping ==
Athlete	Event	Jump 1		Jump 2		Total	
Athlete	Event	Distance	Points	Distance	Points	Points	Rank
Josef Samek	Normal hill	67.5	84.7	79.0	105.6	190.3	39
Leoš Škoda	Normal hill	75.0	100.7	83.0	119.0	219.7	22
Josef Samek	Large hill	97.0	103.0	102.0	110.5	213.5	23
Leoš Škoda	Large hill	106.0	116.6	96.0	100.6	217.2	21
