= France at the 1980 Winter Olympics =

- IOC code: FRA
- NOC: French National Olympic and Sports Committee

in Lake Placid
- Competitors: 22 (16 men, 6 women) in 6 sports
- Flag bearers: Fabienne Serrat, Alpine Skiing
- Medals Ranked 16th: Gold 0 Silver 0 Bronze 1 Total 1

Winter Olympics appearances (overview)
- 1924; 1928; 1932; 1936; 1948; 1952; 1956; 1960; 1964; 1968; 1972; 1976; 1980; 1984; 1988; 1992; 1994; 1998; 2002; 2006; 2010; 2014; 2018; 2022; 2026

France competed at the 1980 Winter Olympics in Lake Placid, United States, from 14 February to 23 February 1980.

== Medalists ==
| Medal | Name | Sport | Event | Date |
|---|---|---|---|---|
| Bronze | Perrine Pelen | Alpine skiing | Women's giant slalom | 20 February |

== Alpine skiing ==
Men

| Athlete | Event | Race 1 | | Race 2 | | Total | |
| Athlete | Event | Time | Rank | Time | Rank | Time | Rank |
|---|---|---|---|---|---|---|---|
| Philippe Pugnat | Downhill | | | | | 1:50.13 | 25 |

Women

| Athlete | Event | Race 1 | | Race 2 | | Total | |
| Athlete | Event | Time | Rank | Time | Rank | Time | Rank |
|---|---|---|---|---|---|---|---|
| Caroline Attia | Downhill | | | | | DNF | – |
| Marie-Luce Waldmeier | Downhill | | | | | 1:41.05 | 16 |
| Anne-Flore Rey | Giant Slalom | 1:20.03 | 30 | 1:31.38 | 23 | 2:51.41 | 25 |
| Marina Laurencon | Giant Slalom | 1:18.49 | 23 | DNF | – | DNF | – |
| Perrine Pelen | Giant Slalom | 1:15.45 | 6 | 1:26.96 | 1 | 2:42.41 | 3rd place, bronze medalist(s) |
| Fabienne Serrat | Giant Slalom | 1:15.43 | 5 | 1:26.99 | 2 | 2:42.42 | 4 |
| Marina Laurencon | Slalom | DNF | – | – | – | DNF | – |
| Anne-Flore Rey | Slalom | DNF | – | – | – | DNF | – |
| Fabienne Serrat | Slalom | 44.40 | 8 | DNF | – | DNF | – |
| Perrine Pelen | Slalom | 43.46 | 4 | DNF | – | DNF | – |

== Biathlon ==
Men

| Event | Athlete | Misses ^{1} | Time | Rank |
|---|---|---|---|---|
| 10 km Sprint | Yves Blondeau | 8 | 37:44.87 | 39 |
| 10 km Sprint | Yvon Mougel | 6 | 36:57.43 | 33 |
| 10 km Sprint | Christian Poirot | 1 | 34:38.60 | 13 |

| Event | Athlete | Time | Penalties | Adjusted time ^{2} | Rank |
|---|---|---|---|---|---|
| 20 km | Denis Sandona | 1'13:21.01 | 2 | 1'15:21.01 | 20 |
| 20 km | André Geourjon | 1'10:53.37 | 2 | 1'12:53.37 | 9 |
| 20 km | Yvon Mougel | 1'08:33.60 | 3 | 1'11:33.60 | 6 |

Men's 4 x 7.5 km relay

| Athletes | Race | | |
| Athletes | Misses ^{1} | Time | Rank |
|---|---|---|---|
| Yvon Mougel; Denis Sandona; André Geourjon; Christian Poirot | 0 | 1'38:23.36 | 5 |

^{1} A penalty loop of 150 metres had to be skied per missed target.
^{2} One minute added per close miss (a hit in the outer ring), two minutes added per complete miss.

== Cross-country skiing ==
Men

| Event | Athlete | Race | |
| Event | Athlete | Time | Rank |
|---|---|---|---|
| 15 km | Dominique Locatelli | 47:06.72 | 45 |
| 15 km | Gérard Durand-Poudret | 45:47.26 | 42 |
| 15 km | Paul Fargeix | 44:39.94 | 28 |
| 15 km | Jean-Paul Pierrat | 43:32.53 | 14 |
| 30 km | Michel Thierry | 1'38:17.35 | 44 |
| 30 km | Philippe Poirot | 1'35:47.39 | 38 |
| 30 km | Paul Fargeix | 1'35:12.25 | 35 |
| 30 km | Jean-Paul Pierrat | 1'31:43.03 | 19 |
| 50 km | Philippe Poirot | DNF | – |
| 50 km | Paul Fargeix | 2'45:39.70 | 35 |
| 50 km | Michel Thierry | 2'41:38.26 | 31 |
| 50 km | Jean-Paul Pierrat | 2'34:13.07 | 12 |

Men's 4 × 10 km relay

| Athletes | Race | |
| Athletes | Time | Rank |
|---|---|---|
| Paul Fargeix; Gérard Durand-Poudret; Michel Thierry; Jean-Paul Pierrat | 2'08:43.61 | 10 |

== Figure skating ==
Men

| Athlete | CF | SP | FS | Points | Places | Rank |
|---|---|---|---|---|---|---|
| Jean-Christophe Simond | 6 | 10 | 9 | 175.00 | 64 | 7 |

== Ski jumping ==
| Athlete | Event | Jump 1 | | Jump 2 | | Total | |
| Athlete | Event | Distance | Points | Distance | Points | Points | Rank |
|---|---|---|---|---|---|---|---|
| Gérard Colin | Normal hill | 69.5 | 87.9 | 77.0 | 105.9 | 193.8 | 35 |
| Bernard Moullier | Normal hill | 79.0 | 108.1 | 77.0 | 102.4 | 210.5 | 24 |
| Gérard Colin | Large hill | 89.0 | 86.8 | 91.5 | 93.8 | 180.6 | 42 |
| Bernard Moullier | Large hill | 92.0 | 92.5 | 94.0 | 95.8 | 188.3 | 37 |

== Speed skating ==
Men

| Event | Athlete | Race | |
| Event | Athlete | Time | Rank |
|---|---|---|---|
| 500 m | Emmanuel Michon | 39.47 | 21 |
| 1000 m | Emmanuel Michon | 1:19.43 | 18 |
