= Hosoi =

Hosoi (written: 細井) is a Japanese surname. Notable people with the surname include:

- Anette Hosoi, American engineer
- Christian Hosoi (born 1967), American skateboarder
- Hosoi Heishu (細井 平洲, 1728–1801), Japanese Confucianist
- Mikio Hosoi (細井 幹雄, born 1949), Japanese ice hockey player
- Nittatsu Hosoi (細井 日達, 1902–1979), Japanese Buddhist
- Osamu Hosoi (細井 治, born 1964), Japanese voice actor
- Susumu Hosoi (細井 行, born 1949), Japanese businessman
