= Ruger (disambiguation) =

Ruger is a common shortened name for American firearms manufacturer Sturm, Ruger & Co.

Ruger may also refer to:

== People ==
- Ruger (surname)
- Ruger (singer)

== Other ==
- Fort Ruger, a fort on the island of Oʻahu that served as the first military reservation in the Territory of Hawaii
- Ruger Hauer, a hip hop and rap group from Helsinki, Finland
- Ruger Lake, located in Glacier National Park, in the U. S. state of Montana

== See also ==
- Rüger
