= Ruger (surname) =

Ruger is a surname. Notable people include:

- Gaines Ruger Donoho (1857–1916), American painter
- Hendrika Ruger (born 1928), Dutch-Canadian author and publisher
- Johnny Ruger (born 1949), American biathlete
- Theodore Ruger, American jurist and academic administrator
- Thomas H. Ruger (1833–1907), American soldier and lawyer
- William Ruger (disambiguation), several people

== See also ==
- Rüger
