= Kimihiro =

- Gender: Male

Origin
- Origin: Japanese
- Meaning: Different meanings depending on the kanji used

Kimihiro (written: 公宏 or 公博) is a masculine Japanese given name. Notable people with the name include:

- Kimihiro Hamaya (浜谷 公宏; born 1963), Japanese speed skater
- Kimihiro Shinada (品田 公博; born 1949), Japanese bobsledder

== Fictional characters ==
- Kimihiro Watanuki (四月一日 君尋), a character in the manga series xxxHolic

== See also ==
- 27739 Kimihiro, a main-belt asteroid
