= Kaoru Fukuda =

Kaoru Fukuda may refer to:

- Kaoru Fukuda (speed skater)
- Kaoru Fukuda (politician)
