= Shinada =

Shinada (written: 品田) is a Japanese surname. Notable people with the surname include:

- Kimihiro Shinada (品田 公博, born 1949), Japanese bobsledder
- Manato Shinada (品田 愛斗, born 1999), Japanese footballer
