= Brechbühl =

Brechbühl or Brechbuhl is a surname. Notable people with the surname include:

- Beat Brechbühl (born 1939), Swiss journalist, translator, and publisher
- Ulrich Brechbuhl (born 1964), Swiss-American businessman and government official
- Urs Brechbühl (born 1946), Swiss biathlete
