= Yuko Ota =

Yuko Ota may refer to

- Yuko Ota (speed skater), Japanese Olympic speed skater
- Yuko Ota, the illustrator of Johnny Wander
