= Celestino Midali =

Italian biathlete (born 1957)

Personal information
- Nationality: Italian
- Born: 18 January 1957 (age 68); Isola di Fondra, Italy

Sport
- Sport: Biathlon

Celestino Midali (born 18 January 1957) is an Italian biathlete. He competed in the relay event at the 1980 Winter Olympics.
