= Harm Kuipers =

Dutch speed skater

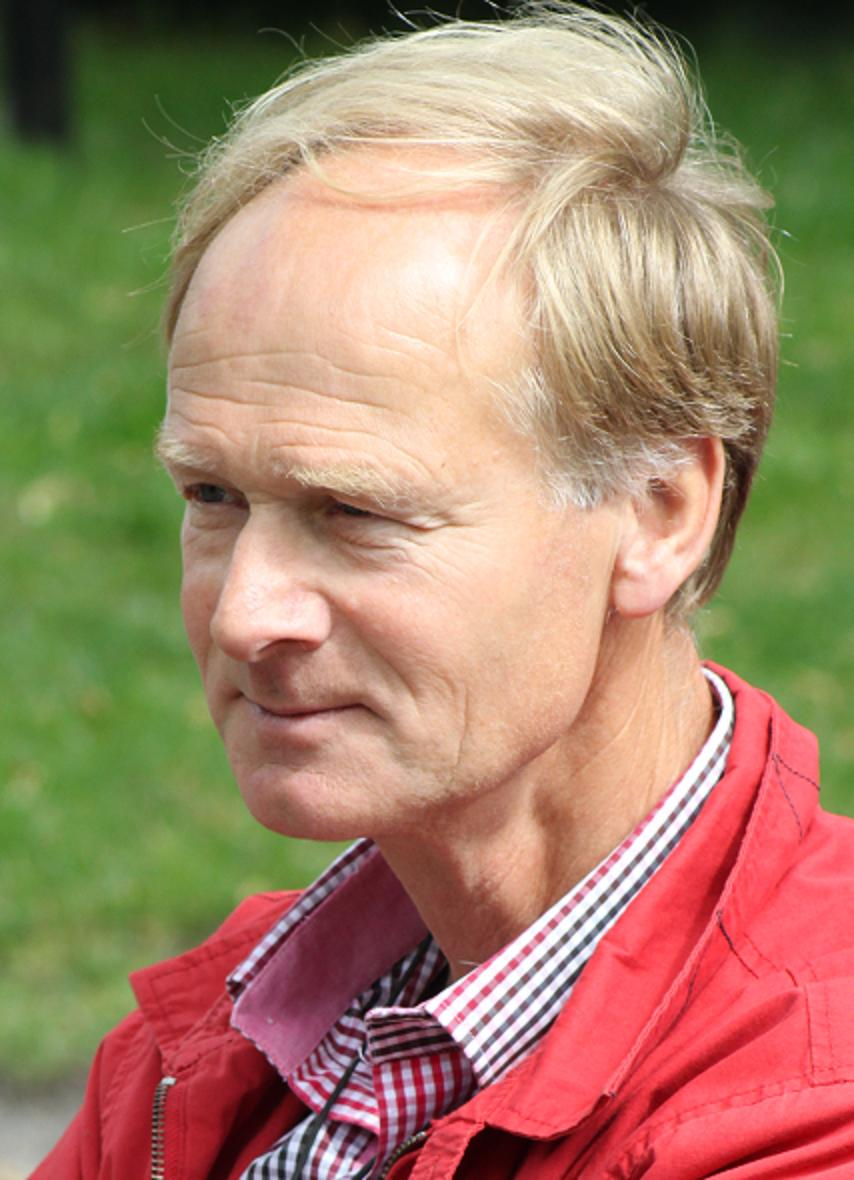
- Harm Kuipers in 2011.

Personal information
- Nationality: Dutch
- Born: November 22, 1947 (age 78) Vries, Netherlands

Sport
- Country: Netherlands
- Sport: Speed skating
- Turned pro: 1969
- Retired: 1975
Medal record
Representing the Netherlands
Men's Speed Skating
World Championships
Gold medal – first place	1975 Oslo	Allround
Silver medal – second place	1974 Inzell	Allround
European Championships
Silver medal – second place	1975 Heerenveen	Allround
Bronze medal – third place	1973 Grenoble	Allround

Harm Kuipers (born 22 November 1947) is a former speed skater from the Netherlands.

Kuipers combined his sports careers with being a Medicine student at the University of Groningen. Preferring his studies over speed skating, he did not participate in the 1972 Winter Olympics, a decision he still regrets today. The best year of his speed skating career was 1975, when he became World Allround Champion, after having won silver the year before. From 1971 to 1976, Kuipers also was a successful amateur bicycle racer.

In December 1973 he married speed skater Marrie Willems in Norg. He had a son with her in 1974 and a daughter Margreet in 1975. They lived in Haren.

Apart from combining his studies with his sports careers, another thing that set Kuipers apart was that he was his own coach, something that was in line with his later scientific career. After winning his world title in 1975, Kuipers concentrated on his scientific career, receiving his M.Sc. in Medicine from the University of Groningen in 1975, a Ph.D. in Physiology from the University of Maastricht in 1983, and he became a full professor at the University of Maastricht in 1992 at the Faculty of Health, Medicine and Life Sciences – Department of Human Movement Sciences. Until 2012, he was a professor of Human Movement Sciences at the University of Maastricht where much of his research focused on the health aspects of physical activity, energy metabolism during exercise, and nutrition.

Since 2000, Kuipers has been a medical advisor to the International Skating Union. From 2000 to 2003, he was member of the list committee of the World Anti-Doping Agency. He also is a member of the medical committee of the International Olympic Committee and an advisor to the Sports Physiotherapy For All (SPA) Project of the International Federation of Sports Physiotherapy (IFSP).

Early in 2010 Kuipers was diagnosed with prostate cancer. He is open about his illness and has talked about it on regional television. Being a doctor he is keen on helping other patients, which is why he wishes to share his own experiences with this disease. Kuipers hopes to beat the statistics for people with prostate cancer. End of 2011 a second cancer, esophagus cancer, was found.

== Personal records ==
Personal records
Men's speed skating
Event	Result	Date	Location	Notes
500 meter	40.4	19 January 1973	Davos	World record at the time was 38.0
1000 meter	1:21.47	16 January 1975	Inzell	World record at the time was 1:17.23
1500 meter	2:02.00	15 January 1972	Davos	World record at the time was 1:58.7
3000 meter	4:20.51	1 March 1973	Inzell	World record at the time was 4:08.3
5000 meter	7:24.54	9 February 1974	Inzell	World record at the time was 7:09.8
10000 meter	15:21.29	2 March 1975	Inzell	World record at the time was 14:55.9
Big combination	173.305	10 February 1974	Inzell	World record at the time was 167.420

Kuipers has an Adelskalender score of 171.584 points.

== Tournament overview ==
Season	Dutch Championships Allround	European Championships Allround	World Championships Allround	World Championships Sprint
1968–69	HEERENVEEN 18th 500m 20th 5000m 11th 1500m 15th 10000m 14th overall			
1969–70	DEVENTER (bronze) 500m 13th 5000m 12th 1500m 11th 10000m 9th overall			
1970–71	AMSTERDAM 8th 500m 12th 5000m 9th 1500m 11th 10000m 10th overall			
1971–72	DEVENTER 5th 500m (silver) 5000m (bronze) 1500m 4th 10000m 4th overall	DAVOS 19th 500m 7th 5000m 9th 1500m DNQ 10000m NC overall		
1972–73	HEERENVEEN (silver) 500m 6th 5000m (gold) 1500m 6th 10000m 4th overall	GRENOBLE 9th 500m 4th 5000m 5th 1500m 5th 10000m (bronze) overall	DEVENTER 10th 500m 6th 5000m 5th 1500m 5th 10000m 4th overall	
1973–74	ASSEN (gold) 500m (silver) 5000m (gold) 1500m 6th 10000m (gold) overall	ESKILSTUNA 8th 500m 6th 5000m 5th 1500m (bronze) 10000m 4th overall	INZELL 11th 500m (silver) 5000m 4th 1500m (silver) 10000m (silver) overall	
1974–75	ASSEN (gold) 500m (gold) 5000m (gold) 1500m 4th 10000m (gold) overall	HEERENVEEN 4th 500m (bronze) 5000m (silver) 1500m 7th 10000m (silver) overall	OSLO (bronze) 500m (bronze) 5000m 5th 1500m 6th 10000m (gold) overall	GOTHENBURG 22nd 500m 9th 1000m 23rd 500m 7th 1000m 14th overall

- NC = No classification
- DNQ = Did not qualify for the final distance

== Medals won ==
Championship	Gold (gold)	Silver (silver)	Bronze (bronze)
Dutch Allround	2	0	0
European Allround	0	1	1
World Allround	1	1	0
World Sprint	0	0	0

== Decoration ==
In 2010 Kuipers was awarded the Dutch Order of Chivalry of Orange-Nassau which is granted for those who have earned special merits for society.
