= Miroslav Fryčer =

Czech ice hockey player and coach (1959–2021)

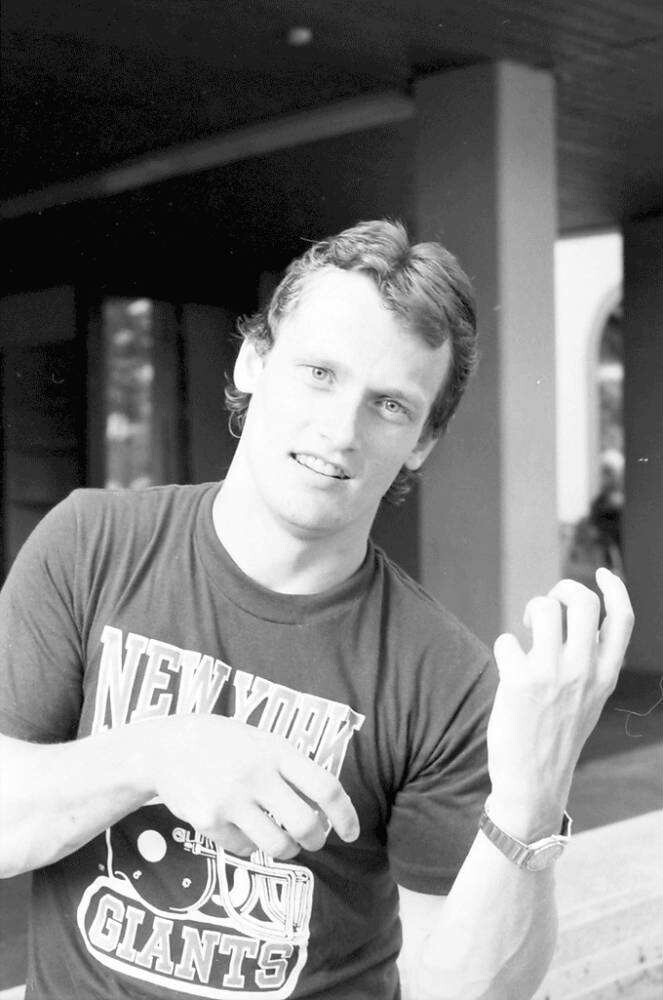
- Fryčer in 1986
- Born: 27 September 1959 Opava, Czechoslovakia
- Died: 27 April 2021 (aged 61) Kobeřice, Czech Republic
- Height: 6 ft 0 in (183 cm)
- Weight: 200 lb (91 kg; 14 st 4 lb)
- Position: Right wing
- Shot: Left
- Played for: HC Vítkovice; Quebec Nordiques; Toronto Maple Leafs; Detroit Red Wings; Edmonton Oilers; EHC Freiburg; HC Brunico
- National team: Czechoslovakia
- NHL draft: Undrafted
- Playing career: 1979–1991

Miroslav Fryčer (27 September 1959 – 27 April 2021) was a Czech ice hockey forward who played eight seasons in the National Hockey League (NHL). He played for the Quebec Nordiques, Toronto Maple Leafs, Detroit Red Wings, and Edmonton Oilers from 1981 to 1989. After retiring, he served as head coach of Orli Znojmo in the Austrian-based Erste Bank Hockey League. He was often referred to by his nicknames of Mirko or Miro.

Fryčer played hockey in Czechoslovakia until he defected in 1981. He was signed by the Quebec Nordiques and made his NHL debut that same year, before being traded to the Toronto Maple Leafs. He spent seven seasons with that organization, making one All-Star appearance in 1985 and leading the team in points one year later. After a public spat with head coach John Brophy, Fryčer was traded to the Detroit Red Wings at the end of the 1987–88 season. He was then dealt to the Edmonton Oilers in January 1989, before returning to Europe.

== Early life ==
Fryčer was born in Opava, Czechoslovakia, on 27 September 1959. He played for Vítkovice from 1976 until 1981. He defected to Canada via Bern, Switzerland, in 1981 when he was with the Czechoslovak national team from the team hotel, together with his parents, his then-wife and their 10-month old daughter. He was signed as an undrafted free agent by the Quebec Nordiques before the 1981–82 season.

== Professional career ==
=== Nordiques and Maple Leafs (1981–1988) ===
Fryčer started his NHL career with the Quebec Nordiques in 1981. In his Colisée de Québec debut, he scored a hat-trick in a 6–4 win over the Toronto Maple Leafs. This, along with his 20 goals in 49 games, drew the interest of the Leafs. Fryčer was subsequently traded to that franchise on 9 March 1982, for Wilf Paiement. The Leafs were eliminated from 1982 playoff contention on 26 March, but Fryčer did play a key role in briefly delaying their elimination; during a game on 24 March, with less than a minute remaining against the St. Louis Blues, Fryčer came on as an extra attacker and scored the game-winning goal. He finished his debut season with the second-most hat-tricks in the league with five.

Fryčer hit 20 or more goals in his first three full NHL seasons (1982, 1983, and 1985). He was named to his only All-Star Game in 1985, and was the only player from the Leafs to be selected. He went on to lead the franchise in points with 75 the following season. He scored four of the Leafs' eleven goals in a 11–9 win over the Edmonton Oilers in January 1986. This was the highest scoring game at the Maple Leaf Gardens. The Leafs advanced to the Stanley Cup playoffs, where they eliminated the Chicago Blackhawks in an upset, before bowing out in the Division Finals to the Blues in seven games. He finished third in the NHL in hat-tricks (3) that year.

The Leafs brought in John Brophy in 1986 to replace Dan Maloney as head coach. Fryčer, who had hoped that the latter would stay on for an additional season, was stripped of the alternate captaincy and clashed publicly with Brophy over the next two seasons. Brophy attempted to goad Fryčer during one practice by slashing him on his surgically repaired knee, thus re-injuring it. After a defeat at the New York Islanders, the pair engaged in a physical altercation that saw Fryčer grab Brophy by the throat. At the conclusion of the 1987–88 season, in which the Leafs won only 21 games, both Fryčer and Börje Salming pointed the finger at Brophy for the team's dismal performance. Fryčer, requested to be traded, contended that 90 percent of the players "despise working for the coach" and he vowed to never play under Brophy again. About a month after the outburst, new Leafs general manager Gord Stellick confirmed that Fryčer would not be returning to the team the following year. He was subsequently traded to the Detroit Red Wings on 10 June 1988 for Darren Veitch.

=== Red Wings and Oilers (1988–1989) ===
During the first half of the 1988–89 season, Fryčer scored 7 goals and added 8 assists in 23 games for the Red Wings. In his second game back at the Maple Leaf Gardens in December 1988, he scored two goals in an 8–2 win for his new team. Fryčer celebrated by flashing the middle finger at Brophy while skating past the Leafs bench. He stated after the game that he hoped to get Brophy fired, adding that "he deserves it"; and Brophy was indeed dismissed as head coach that same month. Fryčer was traded mid-season to the Edmonton Oilers on 3 January 1989. He played 14 games for the franchise (contributing 5 goals and 5 assists), before opting to play in Europe during the 1990 Stanley Cup playoffs. He consequently missed out being part of the Oilers' Stanley Cup-winning team that year. He went on to play two seasons in Freiburg for EHC Freiburg and a season with HC Brunico, playing in Italian Serie A and in Alpenliga.

=== International ===
Fryčer played for the Czechoslovak national team at the 1980 Winter Olympics. He finished the tournament with one goal and two assists and the team placed fifth overall.

== Post-playing career ==
After retiring from professional hockey, Fryčer served as head coach of HC Vítkovice, and coached in the Czech Republic and in Italy. He was later the coach of Czech-based ice hockey team Orli Znojmo for the 2018-19 and 2019–20 seasons.

== Personal life ==
Fryčer was married three times. His first two marriages ended in divorce.

Fryčer was sentenced to 14 days' imprisonment in 1986, after being convicted for a second time of impaired driving. He later released an autobiography in 2018 titled My Wild Hockey Life, which detailed his defection and his struggle with health problems partly brought on by alcohol abuse early in his career. He underwent a liver transplant in 1999, and a kidney transplant in 2018.

Fryčer died on 27 April 2021 in his hometown of Kobeřice, Czech Republic. He was 61, and had reportedly been hospitalized for a blood disorder.

== Career statistics ==
=== Regular season and playoffs ===
			Regular season					Playoffs
Season	Team	League	GP	G	A	Pts	PIM	GP	G	A	Pts	PIM
1977–78	TJ Vítkovice	CSSR	34	12	10	22	24	—	—	—	—	—
1978–79	TJ Vítkovice	CSSR	44	22	12	34	—	—	—	—	—	—
1979–80	TJ Vítkovice	CSSR	44	31	15	46	78	—	—	—	—	—
1980–81	TJ Vítkovice	CSSR	34	33	24	57	26	—	—	—	—	—
1981–82	Quebec Nordiques	NHL	49	20	17	37	47	—	—	—	—	—
1981–82	Fredericton Express	AHL	11	9	5	14	16	—	—	—	—	—
1981–82	Toronto Maple Leafs	NHL	10	4	6	10	31	—	—	—	—	—
1982–83	Toronto Maple Leafs	NHL	67	25	30	55	90	4	2	5	7	0
1983–84	Toronto Maple Leafs	NHL	47	10	16	26	55	—	—	—	—	—
1984–85	Toronto Maple Leafs	NHL	65	25	30	55	55	—	—	—	—	—
1985–86	Toronto Maple Leafs	NHL	73	32	43	75	74	10	1	3	4	10
1986–87	Toronto Maple Leafs	NHL	29	7	8	15	28	—	—	—	—	—
1987–88	Toronto Maple Leafs	NHL	38	12	20	32	41	3	0	0	0	6
1988–89	Detroit Red Wings	NHL	23	7	8	15	47	—	—	—	—	—
1988–89	Edmonton Oilers	NHL	14	5	5	10	18	—	—	—	—	—
1989–90	EHC Freiburg	GER	11	4	13	17	19	—	—	—	—	—
1990–91	EHC Freiburg	GER	33	18	23	41	48	—	—	—	—	—
1991–92	EV MAK Bruneck	ITA	17	19	15	34	16	6	0	2	2	12
1991–92	EV MAK Bruneck	AL	18	9	24	33	21	—	—	—	—	—
1992–93	ESV Königsbrunn	GER-3	—	—	—	—	—	—	—	—	—	—
NHL totals			415	147	183	330	486	17	3	8	11	16

=== International ===
Year	Team	Event	GP	G	A	Pts	PIM
1977	Czechoslovakia	EJC	6	2	5	7	12
1978	Czechoslovakia	WJC	6	2	1	3	2
1979	Czechoslovakia	WC	1	0	0	0	2
1979	Czechoslovakia	WJC	6	1	0	1	8
1980	Czechoslovakia	OG	6	1	2	3	7
1981	Czechoslovakia	WC	8	1	2	3	0
Junior totals			18	5	6	11	22
Senior totals			15	2	4	6	9

== See also ==
- List of Soviet and Eastern Bloc defectors
