= Angelo Carrara =

Italian biathlete (born 1954)

Personal information
- Nationality: Italian
- Born: 13 December 1954 (age 70); Serina, Italy

Sport
- Sport: Biathlon

Angelo Carrara (born 13 December 1954) is an Italian biathlete. He competed in the 20 km individual event at the 1980 Winter Olympics.
