= Kari Saarela =

Finnish biathlete

Personal information
- Nationality: Finnish
- Born: 17 January 1952 (age 73); Jurva, Finland

Sport
- Sport: Biathlon

Kari Saarela (born 17 January 1952) is a Finnish biathlete. He competed in the relay event at the 1980 Winter Olympics.
