= Hans Estner =

German biathlete

Olympic medal record

Men's biathlon

Representing West Germany
Bronze medal – third place	1980 Lake Placid	4x7.5 km relay

Hans Estner (born 7 April 1951 in Tegernsee) is a West German former biathlete who competed in the 1980 Winter Olympics where he won a bronze medal in the 4x7.5 km relay.
