= Moullier =

Moullier is a surname. Notable people with the surname include:

- Bernard Moullier (born 1957), French ski jumper
- Pierre Moullier (born 2000), English actor
