= Josef Koll =

Austrian biathlete (born 1955)

Personal information
- Nationality: Austrian
- Born: 2 December 1955 (age 69); Eidenberg, Austria

Sport
- Sport: Biathlon

Josef Koll (born 2 December 1955) is an Austrian biathlete. He competed in the relay event at the 1980 Winter Olympics.
