= Demetrio Velázquez =

Argentine biathlete

Personal information
- Nationality: Argentine

Sport
- Sport: Biathlon

Demetrio Velázquez is an Argentine biathlete. He competed in the relay event at the 1980 Winter Olympics.
