= Siegfried Dockner =

Austrian biathlete (born 1956)

Personal information
- Nationality: Austrian
- Born: 22 July 1956 (age 68); Frojach-Katsch, Austria

Sport
- Sport: Biathlon

Siegfried Dockner (born 22 July 1956) is an Austrian biathlete. He competed in the 20 km individual event at the 1980 Winter Olympics.
