= Glen Jobe Jr. =

American biathlete (born 1951)

Glenn Jobe Jr.
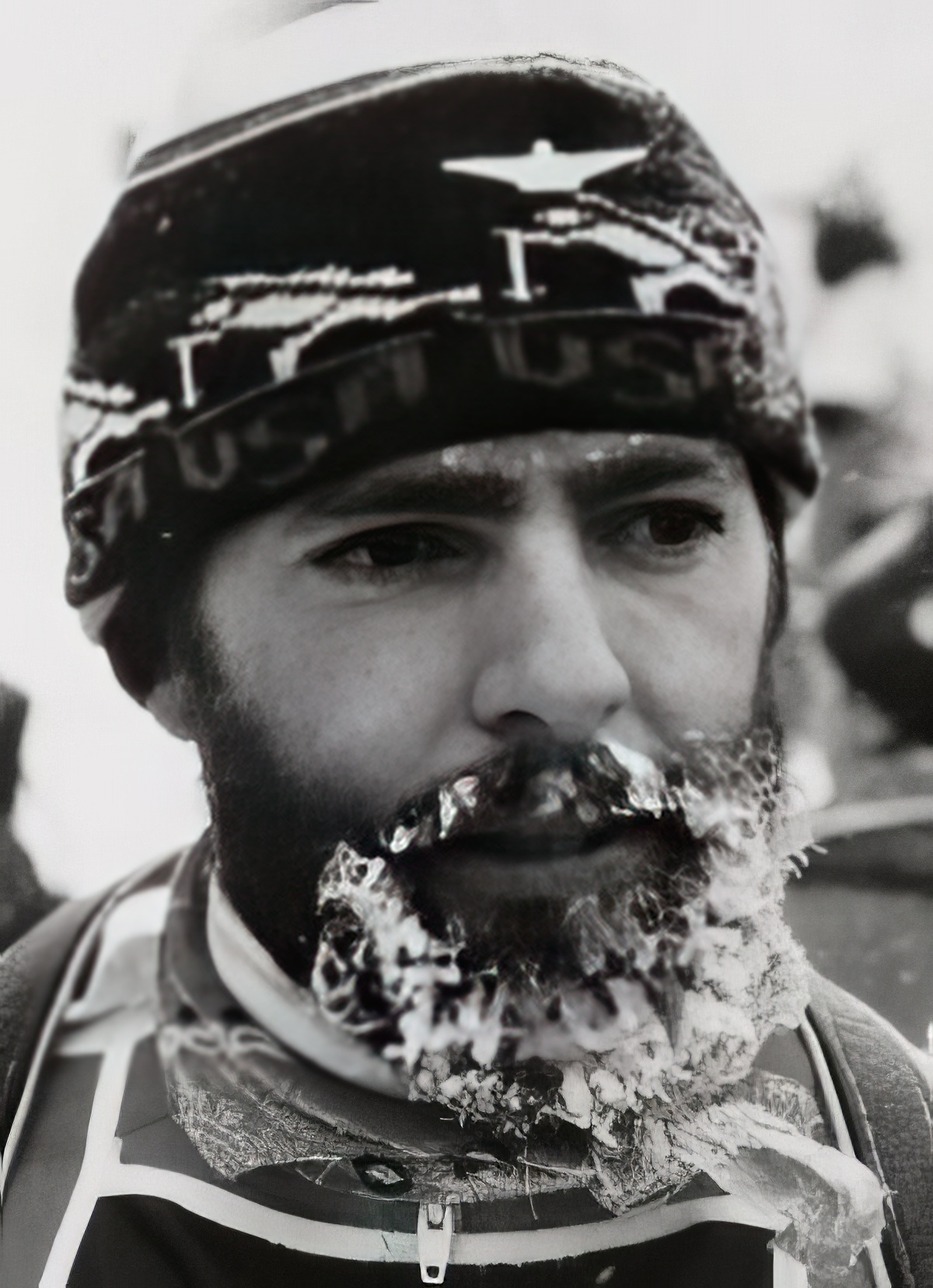

Personal information
- Born: March 4, 1951 (age 75) Stockton, California, United States

Sport
- Sport: Biathlon

Glenn Jobe Jr. (born March 4, 1951) is an American biathlete. He competed in the 20 km individual event at the 1980 Winter Olympics.

He designed and with his wife, Edith, started the cross-country ski areas of Kirkwood and Tahoe Donner, and ran the biathlon program at Auburn Ski Club. He was inducted into the University of Nevada's Wolf Pack Hall of Fame in 2002. He has played a pivotal role in the advancement of cross-country skiing and biathlon in the Sierra region. He is considered one of North America's leading experts on cross-country classic skiing techniques.
