= Takashi Takagi =

Japanese luger (born 1962)

Personal information
- Nationality: Japanese
- Born: 4 June 1962 (age 62); Sapporo, Japan

Sport
- Sport: Luge

Takashi Takagi (born 4 June 1962) is a Japanese luger. He competed at the 1980 Winter Olympics and the 1984 Winter Olympics.
