= Shiro Sato =

Japanese cross-country skier (born 1953)

Personal information
- Nationality: Japanese
- Born: 30 March 1953 (age 71); Yamagata, Japan

Sport
- Sport: Cross-country skiing

Shiro Sato (佐藤 志郎, Satō Shirō, born 30 March 1953) is a Japanese cross-country skier. He competed in the men's 15 kilometre event at the 1980 Winter Olympics.
