= Koji Kuriyama =

Japanese luger (born 1960)

Personal information
- Nationality: Japanese
- Born: 11 July 1960 (age 64); Hokkaido, Japan

Sport
- Sport: Luge

Koji Kuriyama (born 11 July 1960) is a Japanese luger. He competed in the men's singles and doubles events at the 1980 Winter Olympics.
