= Kobeřice =

- Municipality
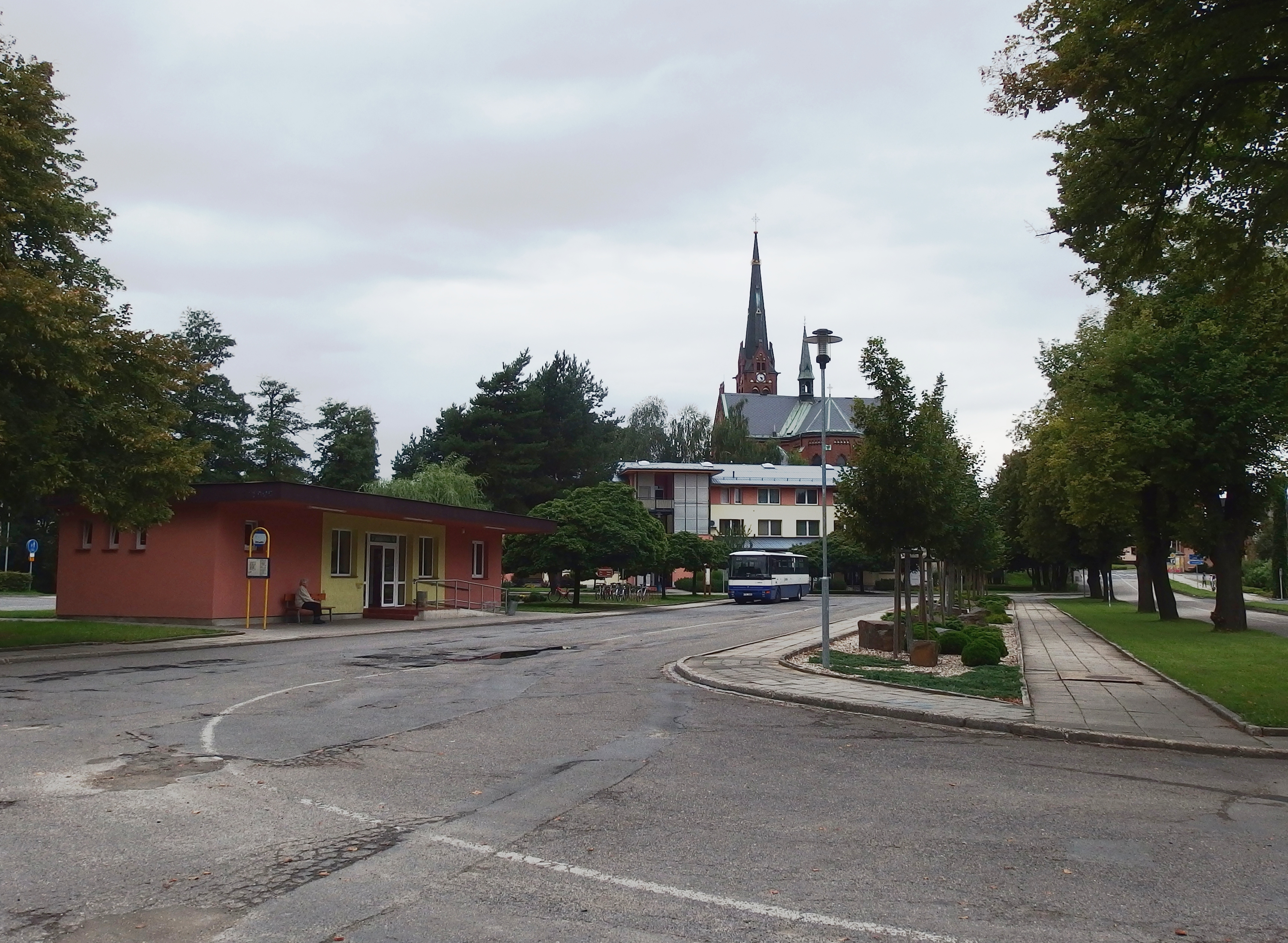
- Centre of Kobeřice

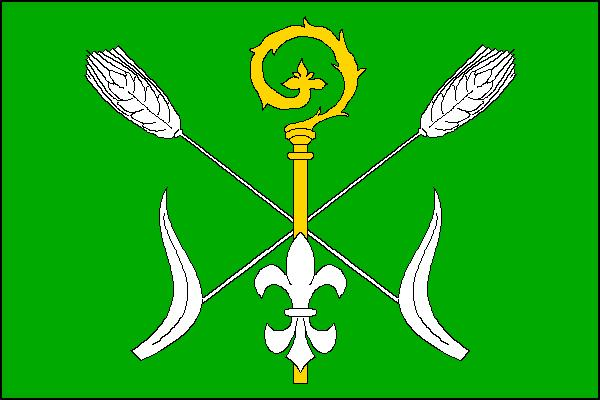
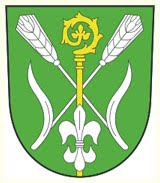
- Flag Coat of arms

- Location in the Czech Republic
- Coordinates: 49°59′8″N 18°3′8″E
- Country: Czech Republic
- Region: Moravian-Silesian
- District: Opava
- First mentioned: 1234

Area
  - Total: 17.15 km^{2} (6.62 sq mi)
- Elevation: 247 m (810 ft)

Population (2026-01-01)
  - Total: 3,194
  - Density: 186.2/km^{2} (482.4/sq mi)
- Time zone: UTC+1 (CET)
  - Summer (DST): UTC+2 (CEST)
- Postal code: 747 27
- Website: www.koberice.cz

Kobeřice (Czech pronunciation: [ˈkobɛr̝ɪtsɛ]; German: Köberwitz, Polish: Kobierzyce) is a municipality and village in Opava District in the Moravian-Silesian Region of the Czech Republic. It has about 3,200 inhabitants. It is part of the historic Hlučín Region.

== Etymology ==
The name is probably derived from the personal name Kober or Jakub. According to other theories, it may be derived from the German words Korb ('basket') or Köbler (designation of a small house next to a farmhouse).

== Geography ==
Kobeřice is located about 11 kilometres (7 mi) northeast of Opava and 23 km (14 mi) northwest of Ostrava. It lies in the Opava Hilly Land. The highest point is at 313 m (1,027 ft) above sea level. The stream Oldrišovský potok flows through the municipality. The municipal territory briefly borders Poland in the north.

== History ==
The first written mention of Kobeřice is from 1234, when the village was owned by the Hradisko Monastery in Olomouc. The document that mentioned Kobeřice in 1183 was a forgery from 1236.

From 1742 to 1918, after Empress Maria Theresa had been defeated, the village belonged to Prussia. In 1920, it became part of the newly established Czechoslovakia.

== Demographics ==
Historical population

Year	Pop.	±%
1869	1,633	—
1880	1,711	+4.8%
1890	1,792	+4.7%
1900	1,817	+1.4%
1910	1,859	+2.3%

Year	Pop.	±%
1921	1,837	−1.2%
1930	2,050	+11.6%
1950	1,899	−7.4%
1961	2,457	+29.4%
1970	2,689	+9.4%

Year	Pop.	±%
1980	2,899	+7.8%
1991	3,125	+7.8%
2001	3,210	+2.7%
2011	3,222	+0.4%
2021	3,137	−2.6%

Source: Censuses

== Transport ==
The I/46 road (the section from Opava to the Czech–Polish border in Sudice) runs through the municipality.

== Sights ==
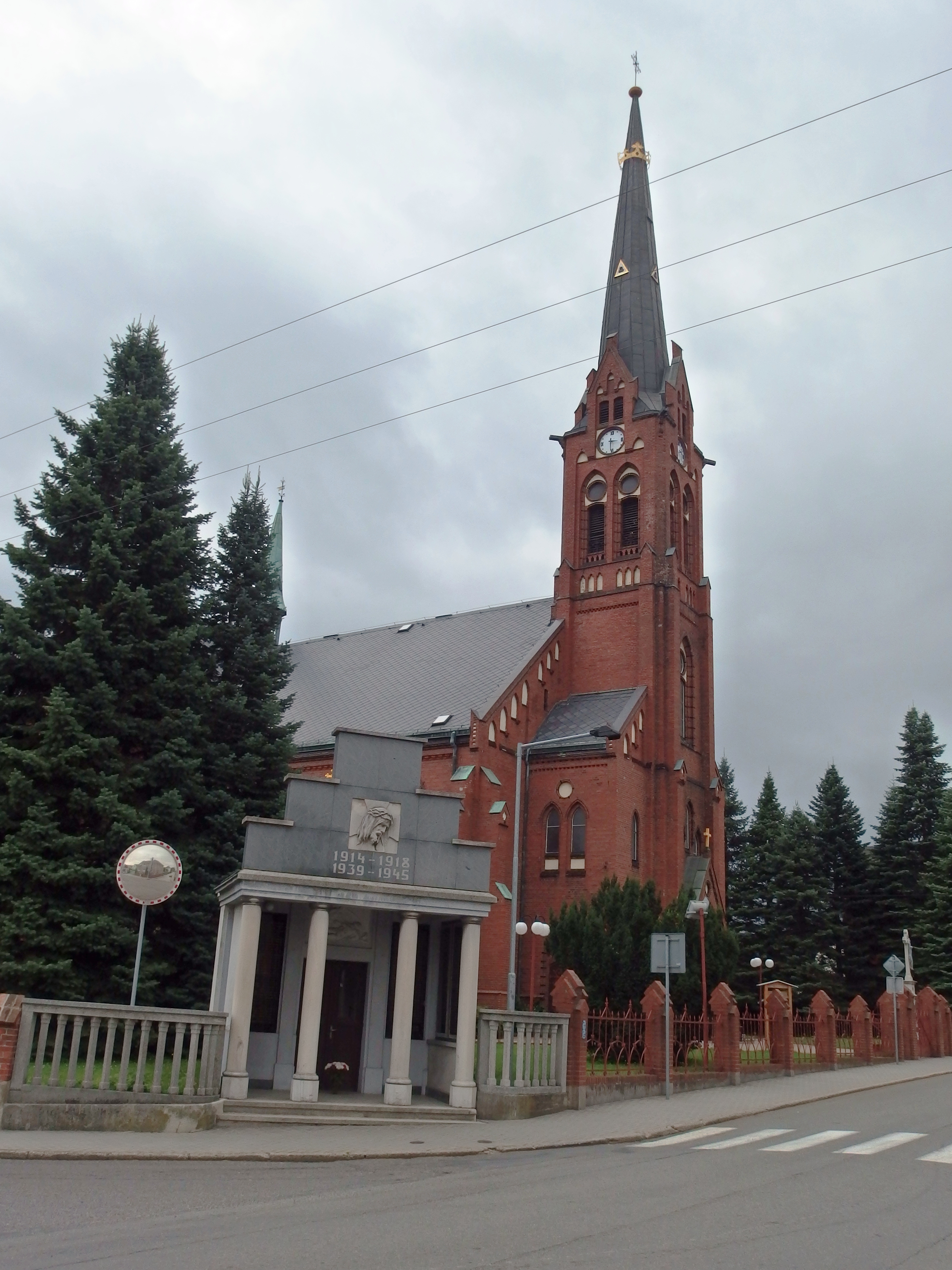
Church of the Assumption of the Virgin Mary

The main landmark of Kobeřice is the Church of the Assumption of the Virgin Mary. It was built in the neo-Gothic style in 1896, when it replaced an old wooden church from 1711.
