= Kazuaki Ichimura =

Japanese speed skater (born 1957)

Personal information
- Nationality: Japanese
- Born: 11 August 1957 (age 67); Karuizawa, Japan

Sport
- Sport: Speed skating

Kazuaki Ichimura (市村 和昭, Ichimura Kazuaki, born 11 August 1957) is a Japanese speed skater. He competed in two events at the 1980 Winter Olympics.
