= Kiyoshi Hayasaka =

Japanese cross-country skier (born 1954)

Personal information
- Nationality: Japanese
- Born: 4 February 1954 (age 71); Yamagata, Japan

Sport
- Sport: Cross-country skiing

Kiyoshi Hayasaka (born 4 February 1954) is a Japanese cross-country skier. He competed in the men's 15 kilometre event at the 1976 Winter Olympics.
