= Urs Brechbühl =

Swiss biathlete (born 1946)

Personal information
- Nationality: Swiss
- Born: 8 March 1946 (age 79)

Sport
- Sport: Biathlon

Urs Brechbühl (born 8 March 1946) is a Swiss biathlete. He competed in the 20 km individual event at the 1980 Winter Olympics.
