= Jan Neliba =

Czech ice hockey player

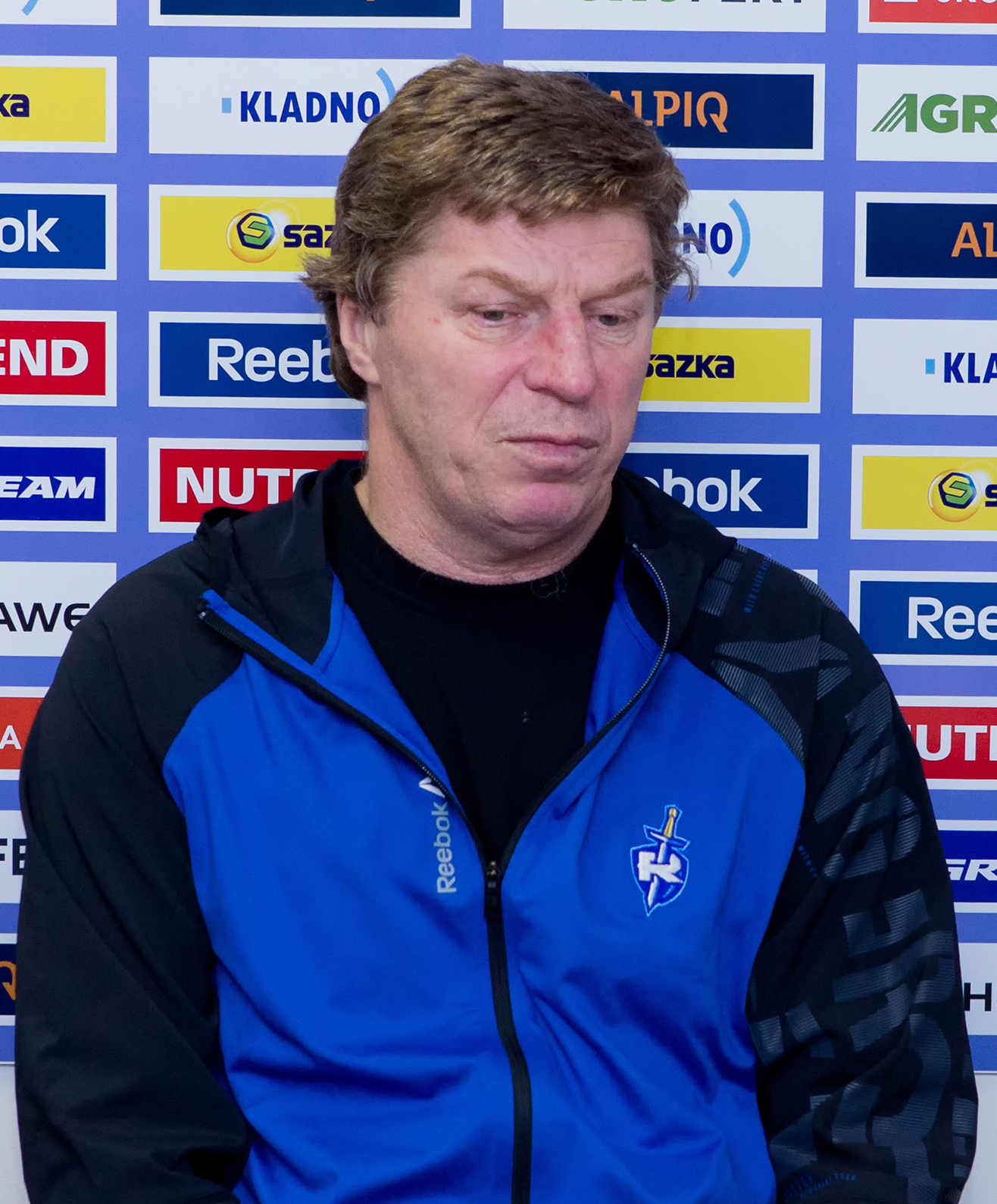
- Jan Neliba in 2013

Personal information
- Nationality: Czech
- Born: 5 September 1953 (age 71); Příbram, Czechoslovakia

Sport
- Sport: Ice hockey

Jan Neliba (born 5 September 1953) is a Czech ice hockey player. He competed in the men's tournament at the 1980 Winter Olympics.
