= Sumihiro Tomii =

Japanese alpine skier (1949–2013)

Personal information
- Nationality: Japanese
- Born: 20 October 1949 Nozawaonsen, Nagano, Japan
- Died: 17 January 2013 (aged 63) Nozawaonsen, Nagano, Japan

Sport
- Sport: Alpine skiing

Sumihiro Tomii (富井 澄博, Tomii Sumihiro; 20 October 1949 – 17 January 2013) was a Japanese alpine skier. He competed at the 1972 Winter Olympics and the 1976 Winter Olympics.
