= Susumu Hosoi =

Japanese businessman (born 1949)

- 細井 行
- Born: 9 August 1949 (age 77); Tokyo, Japan
- Occupations: President and representative director of Isuzu
- Board member of: Isuzu

Susumu Hosoi (細井 行, Hosoi Susumu; born 9 August 1949 in Tokyo) is a Japanese businessman. He has been president and representative director of the Japanese Commercial vehicles chain Isuzu since 2007. Hosoi was elected president and representative director of Isuzu, replacing Yoshinori Ida.
