= Manabu Suzuki (biathlete) =

Japanese biathlete (born 1946)

Personal information
- Nationality: Japanese
- Born: 28 July 1946 (age 78); Hokkaido, Japan

Sport
- Sport: Biathlon

Manabu Suzuki (鈴木 学, Suzuki Manabu, born 28 July 1946) is a Japanese biathlete. He competed in the 20 km individual event at the 1976 Winter Olympics.
