= Johnny Ruger =

American biathlete (born 1949)

Personal information
- Nationality: American
- Born: January 1, 1949 (age 77)

Sport
- Sport: Biathlon

Johnny Ruger (born January 1, 1949) is an American biathlete. He competed in the 20 km individual event at the 1980 Winter Olympics.
