= Ryoji Fujiki =

Japanese cross-country skier (born 1951)

Personal information
- Nationality: Japanese
- Born: 6 April 1951 (age 73); Niigata, Japan

Sport
- Sport: Cross-country skiing

Ryoji Fujiki (藤木 良司, Fujiki Ryōji, born 6 April 1951) is a Japanese cross-country skier. He competed in the men's 15 kilometre event at the 1976 Winter Olympics.
