= Mikio Yamamoto =

Japanese scientist

- Born: July 1944 (age 82); Japan
- Education: Tohoku University
- Scientific career
- Fields: Life Information Science
- Workplaces: NPO-International Research Institute, National Institute of Radiological Sciences

Mikio Yamamoto (山本 幹男, Yamamoto Mikio; born 1944) is a Japanese scientist. His fields are physics, atomic physics, radiation science, medical imaging, life information science and human potential science.

He received his Medical Ph.D. from Tohoku University and his Engineering Ph.D. from University of Electro-Communications.

== Current posts ==
He is chairman of the board of directors at NPO-International Research Institute (NPO-IRI); head, IRI-Institute for Living Body measurements; president, IRI-College (IC); president, IRI-World Happiness Institute (WHI); chairman of the board of directors, (former president) International Society of Life Information Science (ISLIS); head, editorial committee, Journal of International Society of Life Information Science; chief scientific adviser, Human Science Association of Diet Members (House of Representatives and Councilors), Japan; visiting professor, (former guest professor), Toho University, Japan; guest researcher, Hakujikai Institute of Gerontology, Japan; promoter and representative, Japanese Integral Medicine (IMJ).

== Former career ==
Head of laboratory and senior scientist, National Institute of Radiological Sciences (NIRS), Japan; researcher, Washington University in St. Louis; associate professor, Doctor Course of Graduate School, Chiba University, Japan; lecturer, Medical School, Tohoku University, Japan.

== Research ==
- 1971–2005: He researched as a head of laboratory, senior scientist, and others at the National Institute of Radiological Sciences (NIRS), Japan, in Chiba, Japan, for 34 years by his retirement in 2005.
- 1971–1980: At NIRS, he researched and developed with original methods, position sensitive GM-counters, two-dimensional position sensitive multi-wire counters, the first PET (Positron Emission Tomography) in Japan with "Positlogy", an original method, with Dr. Tanaka and others.
- 1980–1982: He researched at Washington University in St. Louis. He researched and developed the PETTVI, a first fast PET with CsF-detectors in the world, and the Super PETT, the first TOF-PET(Time-of Flight Positron Emission Tomography) in the world, with Dr. Ter-Pogosian (a pioneer of PETs) and others.
- 1982–1995: At NIRS, he researched and developed with original methods, direct TOF-PETs, a fast auto-counter of chromosome aberrations, imaging methods of heavy ions for treatments with atomic force microscopes.
- 1993–1995: He started "Human Potential Science" at NIRS in 1993. He had got research project grants from the Japanese Government for "Human Potential Science" for 8 years for 1995–2000 and for 2000–2003. He researched and promote this field.
- 2005–present: He moved his Laboratory to the NPO – International Research Institute (IRI), near to NIRS, Chiba, Japan in April 2005. He continue to research and promote mainly "Human Potential Science".
- 2012 He founded the IRI- World Happiness Institute in Chiba, Japan, and started the research.
