= Rüger =

Rüger is a German surname. Notable people with the surname include:

- Sigrid Damm-Rüger (1939-1995), German feminist activist
- Werner Rüger (fl. late 1930s), German luger

== See also ==
- Ruger (surname)
