= Gérard Durand-Poudret =

French cross-country skier (born 1959)

Personal information
- Nationality: French
- Born: 14 July 1959 (age 65)

Sport
- Sport: Cross-country skiing

Gérard Durand-Poudret (born 14 July 1959) is a French cross-country skier. He competed in the men's 15 kilometre event at the 1980 Winter Olympics.
