= William Ruger =

William Ruger may refer to:

- William Ruger (politician) (died 1843), New York politician
- William B. Ruger (1916–2002), American firearms manufacturer
- William C. Ruger (1824–1892), Chief Judge of the New York Court of Appeals
- William P. Ruger, academic and former nominee for United States Ambassador to Afghanistan
