= Tadamitsu Fujii =

Japanese ice hockey player

Personal information
- Nationality: Japanese
- Born: 24 January 1954 (age 72) Hokkaido, Japan

Sport
- Sport: Ice hockey

Tadamitsu Fujii (藤井 忠光, Fujii Tadamitsu; born 24 January 1954) is a Japanese ice hockey player. He competed in the men's tournament at the 1980 Winter Olympics.
