= Yasuhiro Shimizu =

Japanese speed skater (born 1958)

Personal information
- Nationality: Japanese
- Born: 10 December 1958 (age 67) Hokkaido, Japan

Sport
- Sport: Speed skating

Yasuhiro Shimizu (清水 康弘, Shimizu Yasuhiro; born 10 December 1958) is a Japanese speed skater. He competed in three events at the 1980 Winter Olympics.
