= Satoru Misawa =

Japanese ice hockey player

Personal information
- Nationality: Japanese
- Born: 25 June 1943 (age 81); Hokkaido, Japan

Sport
- Sport: Ice hockey

Satoru Misawa (三沢 悟, Misawa Satoru, born 25 June 1943) is a Japanese ice hockey player. He competed in the men's tournament at the 1980 Winter Olympics.
