= Jiří Novák (ice hockey) =

Czechoslovak ice hockey player

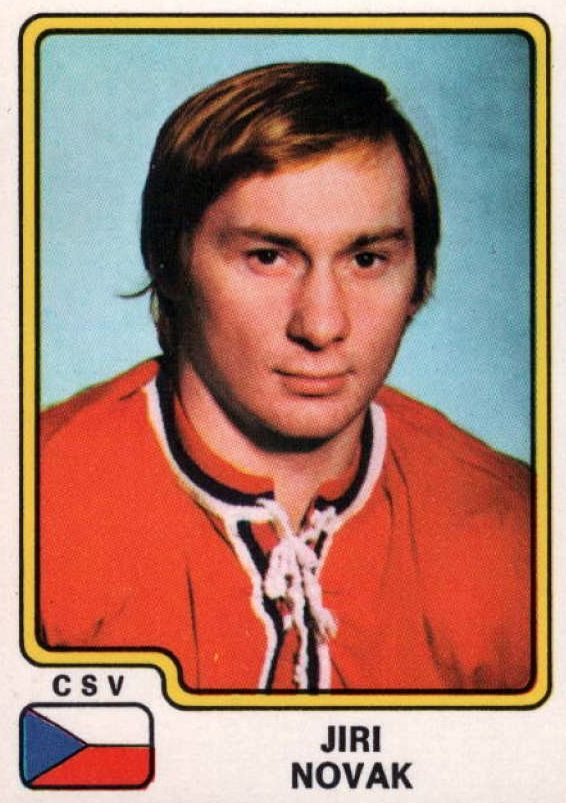

Personal information
- Born: 6 June 1950 (age 76) Jaroměř
Medal record
Men's ice hockey
Representing Czechoslovakia
Olympic Games
Silver medal – second place	1976 Innsbruck	Team

Jiří Novák (born 6 June 1950 in Jaroměř) is a former Czechoslovak ice hockey player. He participated at the 1976 Winter Olympics in Innsbruck, where his team won a silver medal, as well as the 1980 Winter Olympics.
