= Kaoru Fukuda (speed skater) =

Japanese speed skater (born 1955)

Personal information
- Nationality: Japanese
- Born: 4 October 1955 (age 69); Hokkaido, Japan

Sport
- Sport: Speed skating

Kaoru Fukuda (福田 薫, Fukuda Kaoru; born 4 October 1955) is a Japanese speed skater. He competed in two events at the 1980 Winter Olympics.
