= Takashi Shibata =

Japanese biathlete (born 1951)

Personal information
- Nationality: Japanese
- Born: 20 April 1951 (age 73); Hokkaido, Japan

Sport
- Sport: Biathlon

Takashi Shibata (born 20 April 1951) is a Japanese biathlete. He competed in the 10 km sprint event at the 1980 Winter Olympics.
