= Aleksandr Vladimirov =

Russian footballer

Personal information
- Full name: Aleksandr Vladislavovich Vladimirov
- Date of birth: 24 January 1977 (age 49)
- Place of birth: Leningrad, Russian SFSR
- Height: 1.83 m (6 ft 0 in)
- Position: Goalkeeper

Senior career*
Years	Team	Apps	(Gls)
1994	FC Smena-Saturn St. Petersburg	29	(0)
1995	PFC CSKA-d Moscow	2	(0)
1995–1998	FC Rostselmash Rostov-on-Don	32	(0)
1996–1997	FC Rostselmash-d Rostov-on-Don	8	(0)
1998–1999	FC Rostselmash-2 Rostov-on-Don	26	(0)
2000	FC Lokomotiv St. Petersburg	14	(0)
2001–2002	FC Baltika Kaliningrad	36	(0)
2003–2004	FC Oryol	56	(0)
2005	FC Chkalovets-1936 Novosibirsk	20	(0)
2006–2007	FC Metallurg-Kuzbass Novokuznetsk	23	(0)
2008	FC Dynamo St. Petersburg	25	(0)
2009–2010	FC Gornyak Uchaly	25	(0)

International career
1994	Russia U-19	3	(0)
1996	Russia U-21	2	(0)
- * Club domestic league appearances and goals

Aleksandr Vladislavovich Vladimirov (Russian: Александр Владиславович Владимиров; born 24 January 1977) is a Russian former professional footballer.

== Club career ==
He made his debut in the Russian Premier League in 1995 for FC Rostselmash Rostov-on-Don.
