= Mikio Matsuda =

Japanese ice hockey player

Personal information
- Nationality: Japanese
- Born: 18 August 1949 (age 75); Hokkaido, Japan

Sport
- Sport: Ice hockey

Mikio Matsuda (松田 幹郎, Matsuda Mikio, born 18 August 1949) is a Japanese ice hockey player. He competed in the men's tournament at the 1980 Winter Olympics.
