= Takeshi Azuma =

Japanese ice hockey player

Personal information
- Nationality: Japanese
- Born: 9 January 1953 (age 72) Hokkaido, Japan

Sport
- Sport: Ice hockey

Takeshi Azuma (東 毅, Azuma Takeshi; born 9 January 1953) is a Japanese ice hockey player. He competed in the men's tournaments at the 1976 Winter Olympics and the 1980 Winter Olympics.
