= Sadaki Honma =

Japanese ice hockey player

Personal information
- Nationality: Japanese
- Born: 4 June 1953 (age 72) Hokkaido, Japan

Sport
- Sport: Ice hockey

Sadaki Honma (本間 貞樹, Honma Sadaki; born 4 June 1953) is a Japanese ice hockey player. He competed in the men's tournaments at the 1976 Winter Olympics and the 1980 Winter Olympics.
