= Josef Skalník =

Czech biathlete (born 1958)

Personal information
- Nationality: Czech
- Born: 30 March 1958 (age 66); Nové Město na Moravě, Czechoslovakia

Sport
- Sport: Biathlon

Josef Skalník (born 30 March 1958) is a Czech biathlete. He competed in the 20 km individual event at the 1980 Winter Olympics.
