= Mikio Oyama =

Japanese speed skater (born 1955)

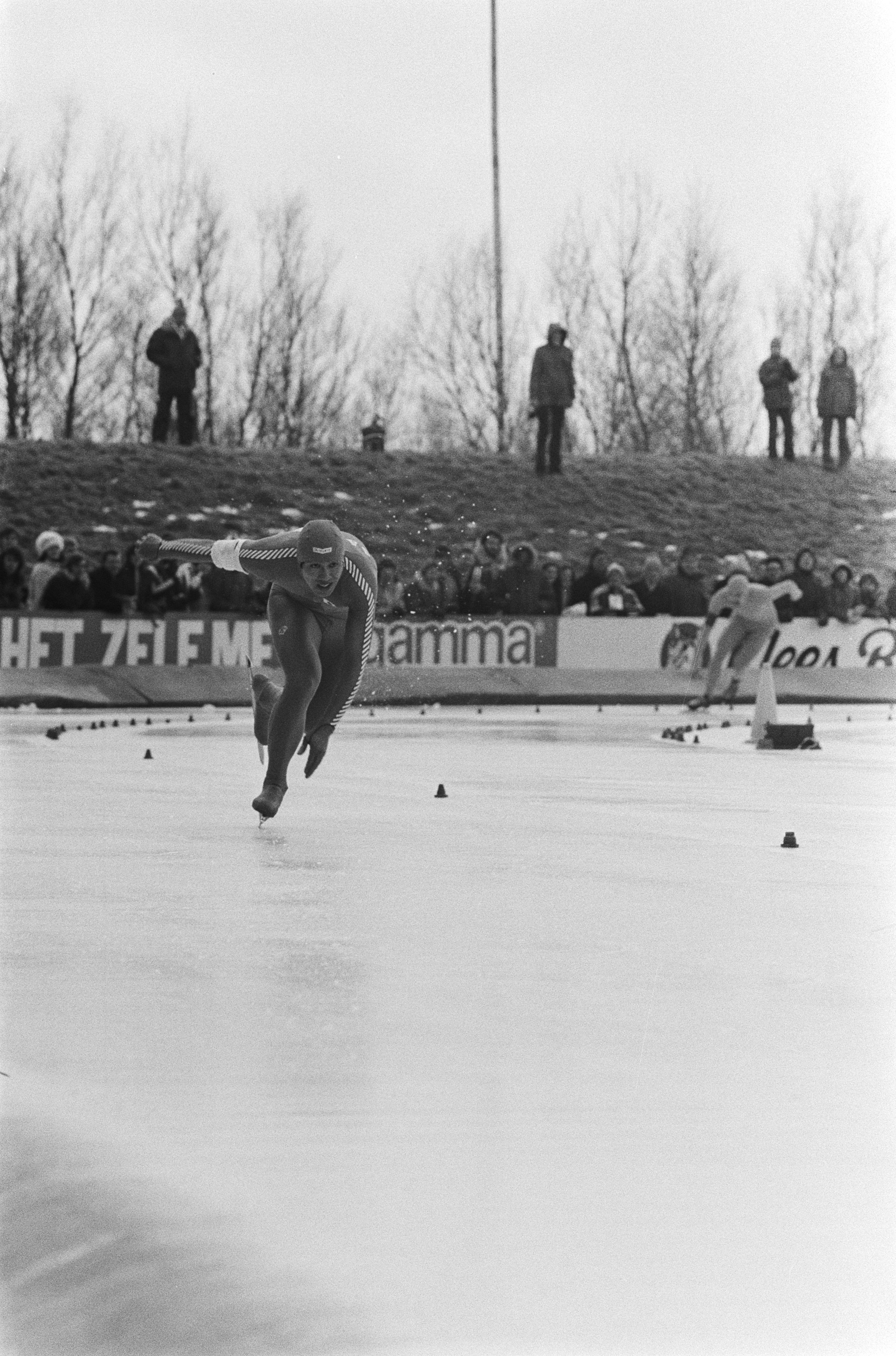

Personal information
- Nationality: Japanese
- Born: 29 October 1955 (age 69); Hokkaido, Japan

Sport
- Sport: Speed skating

Mikio Oyama (大山 三喜雄, Ōyama Mikio; born 29 October 1955) is a Japanese speed skater. He competed in two events at the 1976 Winter Olympics.
