= Tsusumisa Kikuchi =

Japanese biathlete (born 1948)

Personal information
- Nationality: Japanese
- Born: 13 June 1948 (age 76); Hokkaido, Japan

Sport
- Sport: Biathlon

Tsusumisa Kikuchi (born 13 June 1948) is a Japanese biathlete. He competed in the 20 km individual event at the 1980 Winter Olympics.
