= Gerhard Winkler (biathlete) =

German former biathlete (born 1951)

Medal record

Men's biathlon

Representing West Germany

Olympic Games
Bronze medal – third place	1980 Lake Placid	4 × 7.5 km relay

World Championships
Bronze medal – third place	1978 Hochfilzen	4 × 7.5 km relay

Gerhard "Gerd" Winkler (born 17 January 1951 in Langewiese) is a German former biathlete who competed in the 1976 Winter Olympics and in the 1980 Winter Olympics.
