= André Geourjon =

French biathlete (born 1950)

Personal information
- Nationality: French
- Born: 25 August 1950 (age 74)

Sport
- Sport: Biathlon

André Geourjon (born 25 August 1950) is a French biathlete. He competed in the 20 km individual event at the 1980 Winter Olympics.
