= Masaki Suzuki =

Japanese speed skater (born 1945)

Personal information
- Nationality: Japanese
- Born: 2 January 1945 (age 81) Hokkaido, Japan

Sport
- Sport: Speed skating
Medal record
Men's speed skating
Representing Japan
World Sprint Championships
Silver medal – second place	1974 Innsbruck	Sprint

Masaki Suzuki (鈴木 正樹, Suzuki Masaki; born 2 January 1945) is a Japanese speed skater. He competed at the 1968 Winter Olympics, the 1972 Winter Olympics and the 1976 Winter Olympics.
