= Christian Poirot =

French biathlete (born 1956)

Personal information
- Nationality: French
- Born: 12 September 1956 (age 70) Gérardmer, France

Sport
- Sport: Biathlon

Christian Poirot (French: [kʁistjan pwaʁo]; born 12 September 1956) is a French biathlete. He competed at the 1980 Winter Olympics and the 1984 Winter Olympics.
