= Michio Kubota =

Japanese Nordic combined skier

Personal information
- Nationality: Japanese
- Born: 21 October 1949 (age 75); Niigata, Japan

Sport
- Sport: Nordic combined

Michio Kubota (久保田 三知男, Kubota Michio, born 21 October 1949) is a Japanese skier. He competed in the Nordic combined events at the 1976 Winter Olympics and the 1980 Winter Olympics.
