= Lake Placid Olympic Sports Complex Cross Country Biathlon Center =

Sports venue at Lake Placid, New York

Coordinates: 44.224420°N 73.913520°W

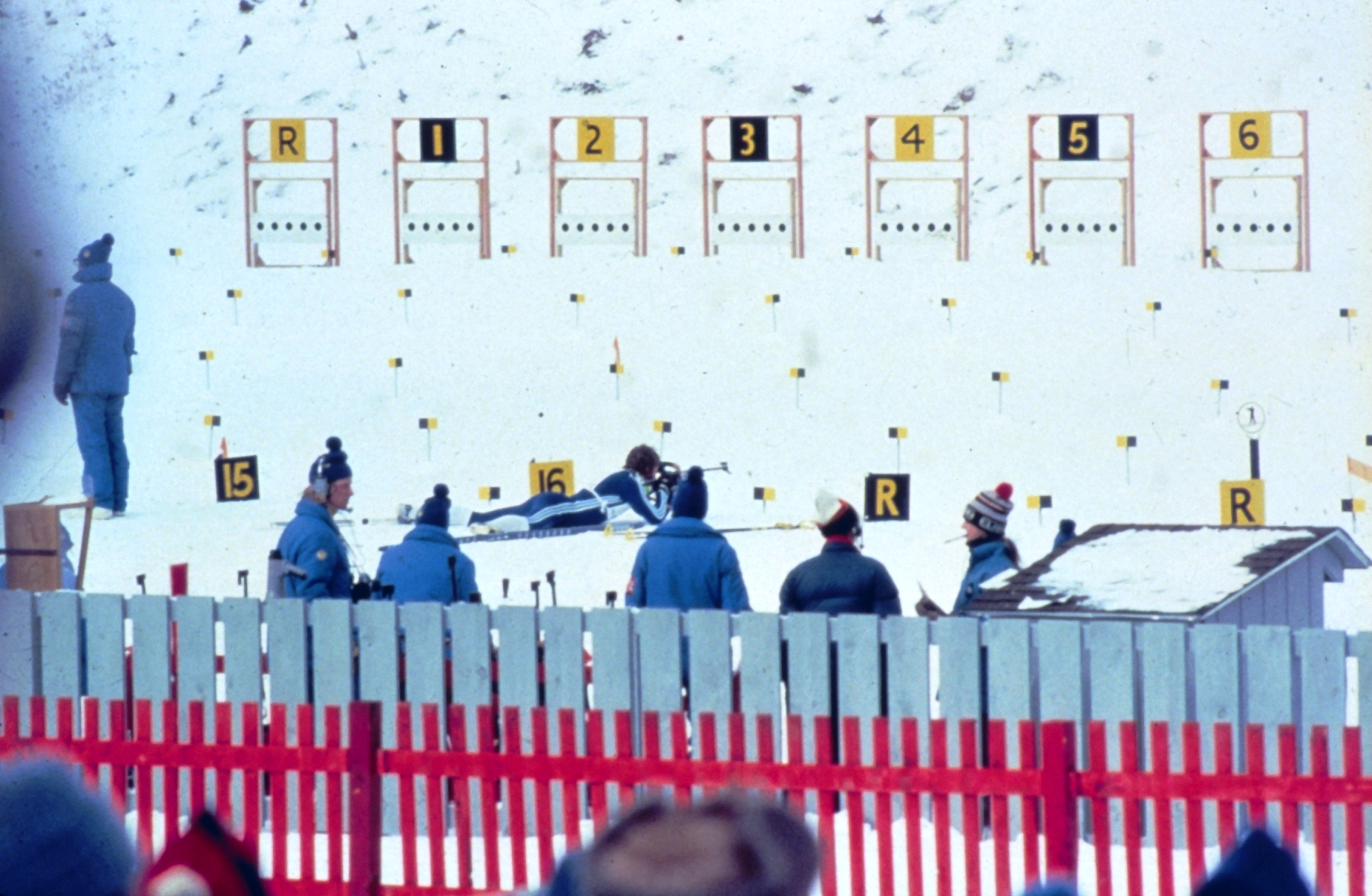
Biathlon at the 1980 Winter Olympics

The Lake Placid Olympic Sports Complex Cross Country Biathlon Center is a venue located in the Lake Placid Olympic Sports Complex at Lake Placid, New York. During the 1980 Winter Olympics, it hosted the biathlon, cross-country skiing, and the cross-country skiing portion of the Nordic combined events.

The center was constructed in 1978 and today has over 50 km (31 mi) of trails for cross country skiing along with a biathlon venue. It also plays hosts to a ski marathon called the Lake Placid Loppet, that takes places in early February. The men's event is 50 km (31 mi) long while the women's event is 25 km (16 mi) long.
