= Tsutomu Hanzawa =

Japanese ice hockey player

Personal information
- Nationality: Japanese
- Born: 28 August 1948 (age 76); Hokkaido, Japan

Sport
- Sport: Ice hockey

Tsutomu Hanzawa (榛沢 務, Hanzawa Tsutomu, born 28 August 1948) is a Japanese ice hockey player. He competed in the men's tournaments at the 1972 Winter Olympics, the 1976 Winter Olympics and the 1980 Winter Olympics.
