= Norio Hirate =

Japanese speed skater (born 1948)

Personal information
- Nationality: Japanese
- Born: 8 December 1948 (age 76); Hokkaido, Japan

Sport
- Sport: Speed skating

Norio Hirate (平手 則男, Hirate Norio, born 8 December 1948) is a Japanese speed skater. He competed at the 1972 Winter Olympics and the 1976 Winter Olympics.
