= Vladimir Ivanov (speed skater) =

Soviet speed skater

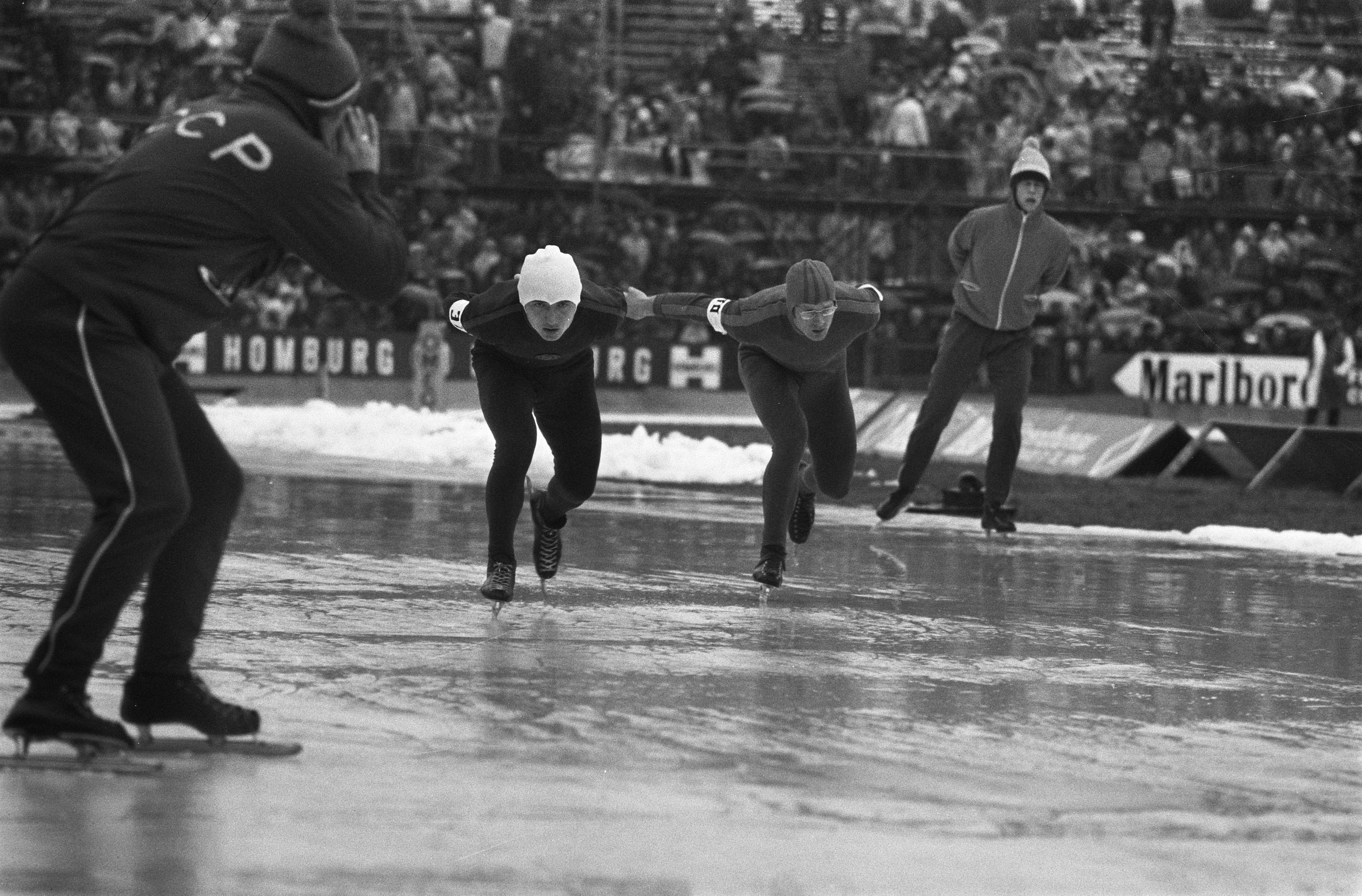

Personal information
- Nationality: Soviet
- Born: 28 April 1949 (age 75); Izhevsk, Russian SFSR, Soviet Union

Sport
- Sport: Speed skating

Vladimir Ivanov (born 28 April 1949) is a Soviet speed skater. He competed in two events at the 1976 Winter Olympics.
