= Herbert Schwarz =

German speed skater

Personal information
- Nationality: German
- Born: 8 March 1953 (age 72); Bad Aibling, West Germany

Sport
- Sport: Speed skating

Herbert Schwarz (born 8 March 1953) is a German former speed skater. He competed at the 1972 Winter Olympics, the 1976 Winter Olympics and the 1980 Winter Olympics.
