= Denis Sandona =

French biathlete (born 1955)

Personal information
- Nationality: French
- Born: 5 October 1955 (age 69)

Sport
- Sport: Biathlon

Denis Sandona (born 5 October 1955) is a French biathlete. He competed in the 20 km individual event at the 1980 Winter Olympics.
