= Mikio Hosoi =

Japanese ice hockey player

Personal information
- Nationality: Japanese
- Born: 19 September 1949 (age 75)

Sport
- Sport: Ice hockey

Mikio Hosoi (細井 幹雄, Hosoi Mikio, born 19 September 1949) is a Japanese ice hockey player. He competed in the men's tournament at the 1980 Winter Olympics.
