= Mikio Katagiri =

Japanese alpine skier (born 1955)

Personal information
- Nationality: Japanese
- Born: 9 January 1955 (age 70); Nozawaonsen, Nagano, Japan

Sport
- Sport: Alpine skiing

Mikio Katagiri (片桐 幹雄, Katagiri Mikio, born 9 January 1955) is a Japanese alpine skier. He competed in the 1976 Winter Olympics and the 1980 Winter Olympics.
