= Kimihiro Shinada =

Japanese bobsledder (born 1949)

Personal information
- Nationality: Japanese
- Born: 27 May 1949 (age 75); Hokkaido, Japan

Sport
- Sport: Bobsleigh

Kimihiro Shinada (品田 公博, Shinada Kimihiro, born 27 May 1949) is a Japanese bobsledder. He competed in the two man and the four man events at the 1976 Winter Olympics.
