= Yuko Yaegashi-Ota =

Japanese speed skater (born 1957)

Personal information
- Nationality: Japanese
- Born: 26 April 1957 (age 67); Hokkaido, Japan

Sport
- Sport: Speed skating

Yuko Yaegashi-Ota (born 26 April 1957) is a Japanese speed skater. She competed at the 1976 Winter Olympics and the 1980 Winter Olympics.
