= Zdeněk Hák =

Czech biathlete (born 1958)

Personal information
- Nationality: Czech
- Born: 13 December 1958 (age 66); Jilemnice, Czechoslovakia

Sport
- Sport: Biathlon

Zdeněk Hák (born 13 December 1958) is a Czech former biathlete. He competed at the 1980 Winter Olympics and the 1984 Winter Olympics.
