= Hiroyuki Deguchi =

Japanese biathlete (born 1953)

Personal information
- Nationality: Japanese
- Born: 17 January 1953 (age 72); Hokkaido, Japan

Sport
- Sport: Biathlon

Hiroyuki Deguchi (born 17 January 1953) is a Japanese biathlete. He competed at the 1976 Winter Olympics, the 1980 Winter Olympics and the 1984 Winter Olympics.
