= Finland at the 1980 Winter Olympics =

- IOC code: FIN
- NOC: Finnish Olympic Committee
- Website: sport.fi/olympiakomitea (in Finnish and Swedish)

in Lake Placid
- Competitors: 52 (44 men, 8 women) in 7 sports
- Flag bearer: Heikki Ikola (biathlon)
- Medals Ranked 7th: Gold 1 Silver 5 Bronze 3 Total 9

Winter Olympics appearances (overview)
- 1924; 1928; 1932; 1936; 1948; 1952; 1956; 1960; 1964; 1968; 1972; 1976; 1980; 1984; 1988; 1992; 1994; 1998; 2002; 2006; 2010; 2014; 2018; 2022; 2026

Finland competed at the 1980 Winter Olympics in Lake Placid, New York, United States.

== Medalists ==
| Medal | Name | Sport | Event |
|---|---|---|---|
| Gold | Jouko Törmänen | Ski jumping | Men's large hill (K120 individual 90m) |
| Silver | Juha Mieto | Cross-country skiing | Men's 15 km |
| Silver | Juha Mieto | Cross-country skiing | Men's 50 km |
| Silver | Hilkka Riihivuori | Cross-country skiing | Women's 5 km |
| Silver | Hilkka Riihivuori | Cross-country skiing | Women's 10 km |
| Silver | Jouko Karjalainen | Nordic combined | Men's individual |
| Bronze | Harri Kirvesniemi; Juha Mieto; Matti Pitkänen; Pertti Teurajärvi | Cross-country skiing | Men's 4 × 10 km relay |
| Bronze | Helena Takalo | Cross-country skiing | Women's 10 km |
| Bronze | Jari Puikkonen | Ski jumping | Men's large hill (K120 individual 90m) |

== Biathlon ==
Men

| Event | Athlete | Misses ^{1} | Time | Rank |
|---|---|---|---|---|
| 10 km Sprint | Keijo Kuntola | 5 | 37:15.28 | 35 |
| 10 km Sprint | Arto Sutinen | 3 | 36:01.06 | 24 |
| 10 km Sprint | Erkki Antila | 2 | 34:32.97 | 12 |

| Event | Athlete | Time | Penalties | Adjusted time ^{2} | Rank |
|---|---|---|---|---|---|
| 20 km | Raimo Seppänen | 1'13:15.67 | 6 | 1'19:15.67 | 32 |
| 20 km | Heikki Ikola | 1'10:02.16 | 5 | 1'15:02.16 | 18 |
| 20 km | Erkki Antila | 1'07:32.32 | 4 | 1'11:32.32 | 5 |

Men's 4 x 7.5 km relay

| Athletes | Race | | |
| Athletes | Misses ^{1} | Time | Rank |
|---|---|---|---|
| Keijo Kuntola; Erkki Antila; Kari Saarela; Raimo Seppänen | 6 | 1'38:50.84 | 7 |

^{1} A penalty loop of 150 metres had to be skied per missed target.
^{2} One minute added per close miss (a hit in the outer ring), two minutes added per complete miss.

== Cross-country skiing ==
Men

| Event | Athlete | Race | |
| Event | Athlete | Time | Rank |
|---|---|---|---|
| 15 km | Pertti Teurajärvi | 43:59.08 | 20 |
| 15 km | Kari Härkönen | 43:50.31 | 19 |
| 15 km | Harri Kirvesniemi | 43:02.01 | 8 |
| 15 km | Juha Mieto | 41:57.64 | 2nd place, silver medalist(s) |
| 30 km | Jorma Aalto | 1'32:48.10 | 26 |
| 30 km | Harri Kirvesniemi | 1'31:35.13 | 18 |
| 30 km | Juha Mieto | 1'29:45.08 | 7 |
| 30 km | Matti Pitkänen | 1'29:35.03 | 6 |
| 50 km | Pertti Teurajärvi | 2'36:44.08 | 18 |
| 50 km | Matti Pitkänen | 2'34:09.04 | 11 |
| 50 km | Asko Autio | 2'32:25.57 | 9 |
| 50 km | Juha Mieto | 2'30:30.52 | 2nd place, silver medalist(s) |

Men's 4 × 10 km relay

| Athletes | Race | |
| Athletes | Time | Rank |
|---|---|---|
| Harri Kirvesniemi; Pertti Teurajärvi; Matti Pitkänen; Juha Mieto | 2'00:00.18 | 3rd place, bronze medalist(s) |

Women

| Event | Athlete | Race | |
| Event | Athlete | Time | Rank |
|---|---|---|---|
| 5 km | Marja Auroma | 16:18.44 | 25 |
| 5 km | Marja-Liisa Hämäläinen | 15:58.27 | 19 |
| 5 km | Helena Takalo | 15:32.12 | 8 |
| 5 km | Hilkka Riihivuori | 15:11.96 | 2nd place, silver medalist(s) |
| 10 km | Ulla Maaskola | 33:22.19 | 32 |
| 10 km | Marja-Liisa Hämäläinen | 32:22.88 | 18 |
| 10 km | Helena Takalo | 30:45.25 | 3rd place, bronze medalist(s) |
| 10 km | Hilkka Riihivuori | 30:35.05 | 2nd place, silver medalist(s) |

Women's 4 × 5 km relay

| Athletes | Race | |
| Athletes | Time | Rank |
|---|---|---|
| Marja Auroma; Marja-Liisa Hämäläinen; Helena Takalo; Hilkka Riihivuori | 1'04:41.28 | 5 |

== Figure skating ==
Women

| Athlete | CF | SP | FS | Points | Places | Rank |
|---|---|---|---|---|---|---|
| Susan Broman | 14 | 17 | 17 | 157.54 | 152 | 17 |
| Kristiina Wegelius | 7 | 11 | 12 | 172.04 | 87 | 10 |

== Ice hockey ==
=== First Round - Red Division ===
| Team advanced to the Final Round |
| Team advanced to consolation round |

| Team | GP | W | L | T | GF | GA | Pts |
|---|---|---|---|---|---|---|---|
| Soviet Union | 5 | 5 | 0 | 0 | 51 | 11 | 10 |
| Finland | 5 | 3 | 2 | 0 | 26 | 18 | 6 |
| Canada | 5 | 3 | 2 | 0 | 28 | 12 | 6 |
| Poland | 5 | 2 | 3 | 0 | 15 | 23 | 4 |
| Netherlands | 5 | 1 | 3 | 1 | 16 | 43 | 3 |
| Japan | 5 | 0 | 4 | 1 | 7 | 36 | 1 |

All times are local (UTC-5).

| 12 February 1980; 20:00 | Poland | 5 – 4 (1–0, 4–3, 0–1) | Finland | Olympic Arena, Lake Placid |

Referee:
Haley

| Zabawa (Jobczyk, Małysiak) (PP) - 14:48 | 1 – 0 |
| | 1 – 1 | 21:16 - Levo (Litma, Hakulinen) (PP) |
| Zabawa (Jobczyk, Małysiak) - 27:13 | 2 – 1 |
| Kokoszka (Chowaniec) - 29:52 | 3 – 1 |
| | 3 – 2 | 30:27 - Porvari (Leinonen, Suoraniemi) |
| Jobczyk (Małysiak, Zabawa) - 33:08 | 4 – 2 |
| Kokoszka (Dziubiński, Marcinczak) - 34:40 | 5 – 2 |
| | 5 – 3 | 36:57 - Leinonen (Kiimalainen, Porvari) |
| | 5 – 4 | 46:05 - Leppänen (Levo, Peltonen) |

10 min
Penalties
4 min
25
Shots
49

| 14 February 1980; 20:00 | Japan | 3 – 6 (0–2, 2–2, 1–2) | Finland | Olympic Arena, Lake Placid |

Referee:
Haley

| | 0 – 1 | 02:02 - Hakulinen (Peltonen) (PP) |
| | 0 – 2 | 05:43 - Leinonen (Kiimalainen) |
| | 0 – 3 | 22:47 - Leppänen (Hakulinen, Levo) |
| | 0 – 4 | 33:36 - Leinonen (Leinonen, Porvari) |
| S. Misawa (Hori, Hanzawa) - 37:57 | 1 – 4 |
| Honma (Hori, S. Misawa) (PP) - 39:59 | 2 – 4 |
| | 2 – 5 | 43:34 - Kiimalainen |
| Azuma (Matsuda) - 47:38 | 3 – 5 |
| | 3 – 6 | 51:11 - Leppänen (Levo, Peltonen) |

6 min
Penalties
8 min
29
Shots
51

| 16 February 1980; 20:30 | Canada | 3 – 4 (1–2, 0–1, 2–1) | Finland | Olympic Fieldhouse, Lake Placid |

Referee:
Lindgren

| | 0 – 1 | 04:03 - Peltonen (Suoraniemi) |
| MacLean (Berry, O'Malley) - 14:22 | 1 – 1 |
| | 1 – 2 | 19:51 - Leppänen (Hakulinen, Levo) |
| | 1 – 3 | 37:07 - Koskilahti |
| G. Anderson (Nill, Davidson) - 46:47 | 2 – 3 |
| | 2 – 4 | 56:55 - Suoraniemi (Leppänen) (SH) |
| Primeau (Hindmarch, Devaney) - 57:09 | 3 – 4 |

16 min
Penalties
10 min
33
Shots
26

| 18 February 1980; 17:00 | Finland | 2 – 4 (1–0, 0–1, 1–3) | Soviet Union | Olympic Fieldhouse, Lake Placid |

Referee:
Haley

| Porvari (Suoraniemi) - 17:44 | 1 – 0 |
| | 1 – 1 | 36:01 - Fetisov (Makarov, A. Golikov) |
| Porvari (SH) - 42:38 | 2 – 1 |
| | 2 – 2 | 54:59 - Krutov (Lebedev) |
| | 2 – 3 | 56:07 - Maltsev (Krutov, Lebedev) |
| | 2 – 4 | 56:18 - Mikhailov (Kasatonov) |

14 min
Penalties
8 min
13
Shots
48

| 20 February 1980; 20:00 | Finland | 10 – 3 (2–1, 2–1, 6–1) | Netherlands | Olympic Arena, Lake Placid |

Referee:
Kompalla

| Porvari - 10:41 | 1 – 0 |
| | 1 – 1 | 18:13 - van Wieren (de Heer) |
| Leppänen (Litma, Eloranta) - 18:28 | 2 – 1 |
| | 2 – 2 | 30:25 - Klooster (deGraauw) |
| Villa (Koskinen, Saarinen) - 33:07 | 3 – 2 |
| Porvari (Leinonen) - 34:12 | 4 – 2 |
| Kurri (Litma, Leppänen) (PP2) - 42:35 | 5 – 2 |
| Peltonen (Leppänen, Kurri) (PP) - 43:44 | 6 – 2 |
| Koskinen (Eloranta) (PP) - 44:34 | 7 – 2 |
| Hakulinen (Peltonen, Leppänen) - 46:10 | 8 – 2 |
| Kurri (Eloranta, Hakulinen) (PP2) - 48:16 | 9 – 2 |
| Haapalainen (Leinonen, Kiimalainen) - 51:03 | 10 – 2 |
| | 10 – 3 | 53:04 - Peternousek (de Heer, van Wieren) |

4 min
Penalties
22 min
42
Shots
16

=== Final round ===
The top two teams from each group play the top two teams from the other group once. Points from previous games against their own group carry over, excluding teams who failed to make the medal round.

| Team | GP | W | L | T | GF | GA | Pts |
|---|---|---|---|---|---|---|---|
| United States | 3 | 2 | 0 | 1 | 10 | 7 | 5 |
| Soviet Union | 3 | 2 | 1 | 0 | 16 | 8 | 4 |
| Sweden | 3 | 0 | 1 | 2 | 7 | 14 | 2 |
| Finland 4th | 3 | 0 | 2 | 1 | 7 | 11 | 1 |

| 22 February 1980; 20:42 | Finland | 3 – 3 (1–0, 1–1, 1–2) | Sweden | Olympic Fieldhouse, Lake Placid |

Referee:
Neagles

| Leinonen (Porvari, Kiimalainen) - 03:00 | 1 – 0 |
| Porvari (Eloranta) - 27:06 | 2 – 0 |
| | 2 – 1 | 30:25 - Weinstock |
| | 2 – 2 | 45:24 - Jonsson (Åhlberg, Holmgren) |
| | 2 – 3 | 46:14 - Waltin (Norberg) |
| Leinonen (Porvari) - 47:59 | 3 – 3 |

6 min
Penalties
6 min
25
Shots
30

| 24 February 1980; 11:00 | United States | 4 – 2 (0–1, 1–1, 3–0) | Finland | Olympic Fieldhouse, Lake Placid |

Referee:
(Czechoslovakia) Vladimir Šubrt

| | 0 – 1 | 09:20 - Porvari (Leinonen, Litma) |
| Christoff - 24:39 | 1 – 1 |
| | 1 – 2 | 26:30 - Leinonen (Haapalainen, Kiimalainen) (PP) |
| Verchota (Christian) - 42:25 | 2 – 2 |
| McClanahan (Johnson, Christian) - 46:05 | 3 – 2 |
| Johnson (Christoff) (SH) - 56:25 | 4 – 2 |

10 min
Penalties
4 min
29
Shots
23

Carried over group match:

- Finland 2–4 USSR (Soviet Union)

=== Leading scorers ===
| Rank | Player | GP | G | A | Pts |
|---|---|---|---|---|---|
| 5th | Jukka Porvari | 7 | 7 | 4 | 11 |

- Team roster
  - Antero Kivelä
  - Jorma Valtonen
  - Kari Eloranta
  - Hannu Haapalainen
  - Lasse Litma
  - Tapio Levo
  - Olli Saarinen
  - Seppo Suoraniemi
  - Markku Hakulinen
  - Markku Kiimalainen
  - Jukka Koskilahti
  - Hannu Koskinen
  - Jari Kurri
  - Mikko Leinonen
  - Reijo Leppänen
  - Jarmo Mäkitalo
  - Esa Peltonen
  - Jukka Porvari
  - Timo Susi
  - Ismo Villa
- Head coach: Kalevi Numminen

== Nordic combined ==
Events:

- normal hill ski jumping (Three jumps, best two counted and shown here.)
- 15 km cross-country skiing

| Athlete | Event | Ski Jumping | | | | Cross-country | | | Total | |
| Athlete | Event | Distance 1 | Distance 2 | Points | Rank | Time | Points | Rank | Points | Rank |
|---|---|---|---|---|---|---|---|---|---|---|
| Rauno Miettinen | Individual | 67.0 | 72.5 | 171.9 | 24 | 50:26.9 | 195.640 | 18 | 367.540 | 23 |
| Jorma Etelälahti | Individual | 72.0 | 79.5 | 192.6 | 14 | 50:02.4 | 199.315 | 15 | 391.915 | 13 |
| Jouko Karjalainen | Individual | 79.0 | 81.0 | 209.5 | 7 | 47:44.5 | 220.000 | 1 | 429.500 | 2nd place, silver medalist(s) |
| Jukka Kuvaja | Individual | 68.5 | 68.5 | 155.0 | 31 | 48:32.2 | 212.845 | 7 | 367.845 | 22 |

== Ski jumping ==
| Athlete | Event | Jump 1 | | Jump 2 | | Total | |
| Athlete | Event | Distance | Points | Distance | Points | Points | Rank |
|---|---|---|---|---|---|---|---|
| Kari Ylianttila | Normal hill | 76.0 | 105.8 | 72.0 | 97.4 | 203.2 | 32 |
| Jari Puikkonen | Normal hill | 81.0 | 115.8 | 80.0 | 111.7 | 227.5 | 16 |
| Jouko Törmänen | Normal hill | 83.0 | 119.0 | 85.5 | 124.5 | 243.5 | 8 |
| Pentti Kokkonen | Normal hill | 86.0 | 126.8 | 83.5 | 120.8 | 247.6 | 5 |
| Kari Ylianttila | Large hill | 102.0 | 111.0 | 106.0 | 118.1 | 229.1 | 13 |
| Pentti Kokkonen | Large hill | 105.0 | 115.2 | 105.0 | 115.7 | 230.9 | 12 |
| Jari Puikkonen | Large hill | 110.5 | 126.4 | 108.5 | 122.1 | 248.5 | 3rd place, bronze medalist(s) |
| Jouko Törmänen | Large hill | 114.5 | 133.5 | 117.0 | 137.5 | 271.0 | 1st place, gold medalist(s) |

== Speed skating ==
Men

| Event | Athlete | Race | |
| Event | Athlete | Time | Rank |
|---|---|---|---|
| 500 m | Esa Puolakka | 39.76 | 25 |
| 500 m | Pertti Niittylä | 39.54 | 22 |
| 500 m | Jukka Salmela | 39.32 | 18 |
| 1000 m | Esa Puolakka | 1:23.54 | 35 |
| 1000 m | Jukka Salmela | 1:21.78 | 30 |
| 1000 m | Pertti Niittylä | 1:18.85 | 14 |
| 1500 m | Pertti Niittylä | 2:00.01 | 14 |
| 5000 m | Pertti Niittylä | 7:21.51 | 17 |
| 10,000 m | Pertti Niittylä | 15:29.98 | 19 |

Women

| Event | Athlete | Race | |
| Event | Athlete | Time | Rank |
|---|---|---|---|
| 500 m | Anneli Repola | 44.33 | 20 |
| 1000 m | Anneli Repola | 1:31.76 | 28 |
| 1500 m | Anneli Repola | 2:17.81 | 21 |
| 3000 m | Anneli Repola | 4:50.51 | 15 |
