= List of Olympic men's ice hockey players for Finland =

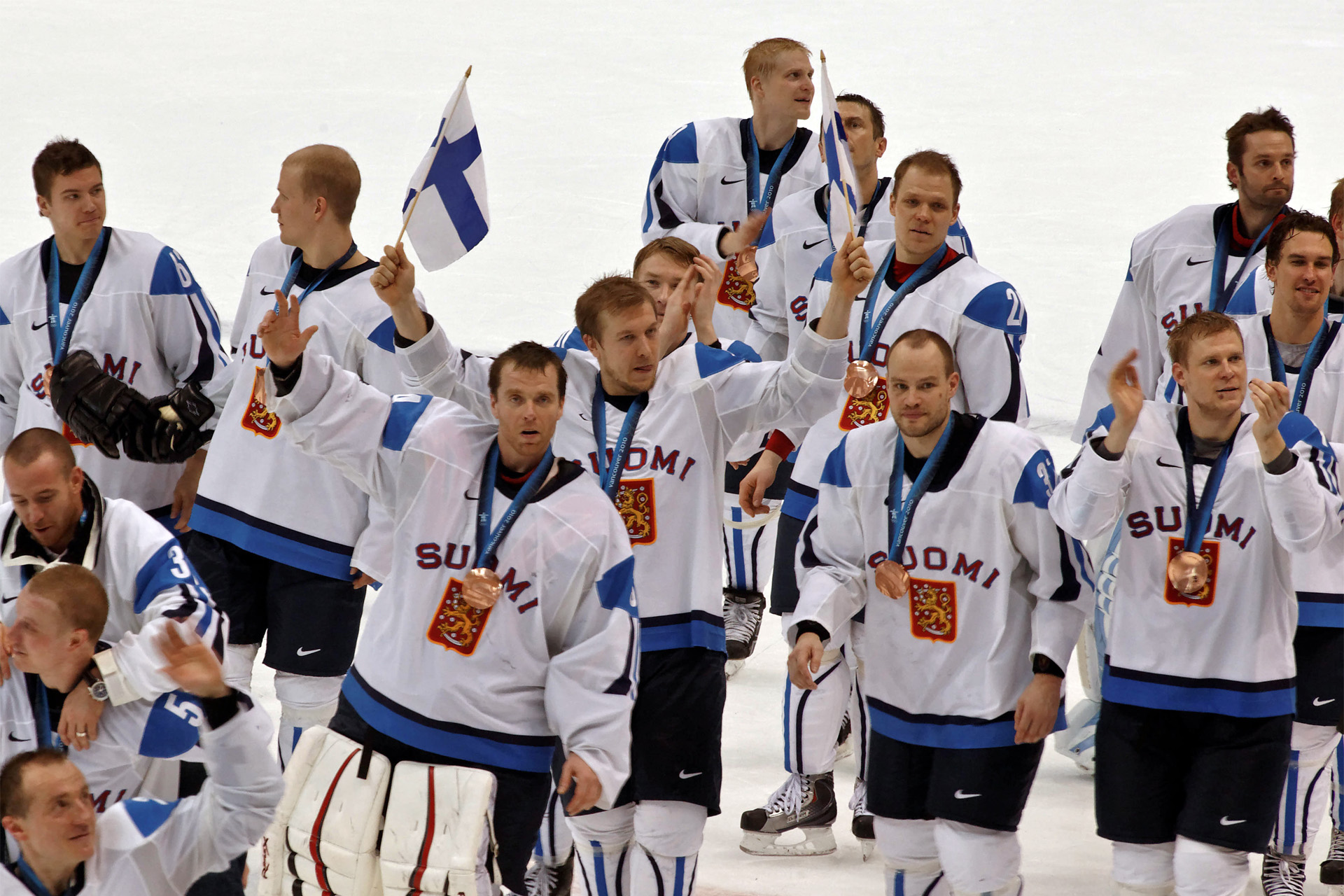
The Finnish national team celebrating after being awarded the bronze medal at the 2010 Winter Olympics

The list of Olympic men's ice hockey players for Finland consisted of 203 skaters and 22 goaltenders. Men's ice hockey tournaments have been staged at the Olympic Games since 1920 (it was introduced at the 1920 Summer Olympics, and was permanently added to the Winter Olympic Games in 1924). Finland has participated in seventeen tournaments, the first in 1952 and the most recent in 2018. Finland has won six medals: two silver and four bronze, with the most recent medal being a bronze in 2014.

Teemu Selänne has scored the most goals, with 24, and has the most points, 43 while Saku Koivu have has the most assists, with 21. Selänne and Raimo Helminen have competed in the most Olympics, having taken part in six tournaments, while Helminen has played the most games of any skater, with 39.

Two players, Jari Kurri and Teemu Selänne, have been inducted into the Hockey Hall of Fame, while 17 players have been inducted into the International Ice Hockey Federation Hall of Fame, though Kalevi Numminen was inducted as a builder and Unto Wiitala as a referee.

== Key ==
General terms
Term	Definition
GP	Games played
HHOF	Hockey Hall of Fame
IIHFHOF	International Ice Hockey Federation Hall of Fame
Olympics	Number of Olympic Games tournaments
Ref(s)	Reference(s)

Goaltender statistical abbreviations
Abbreviation	Definition
W	Wins
L	Losses
T	Ties
Min	Minutes played
SO	Shutouts
GA	Goals against
GAA	Goals against average

Skater statistical abbreviations
Abbreviation	Definition
G	Goals
A	Assists
P	Points
PIM	Penalty minutes

== Goaltenders ==
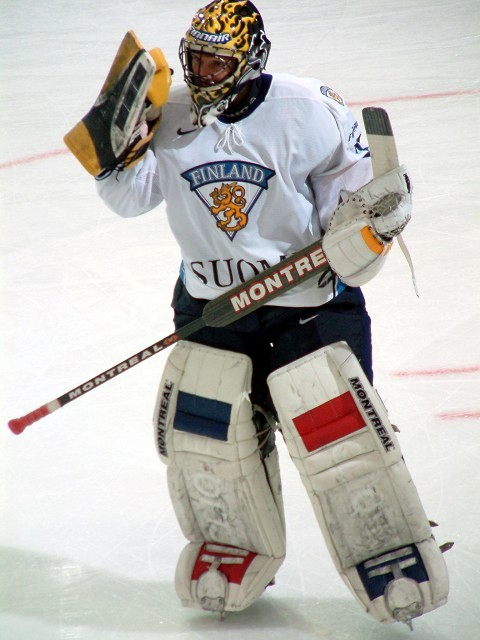
Niklas Bäckström played two games at the 2010 Winter Olympics.

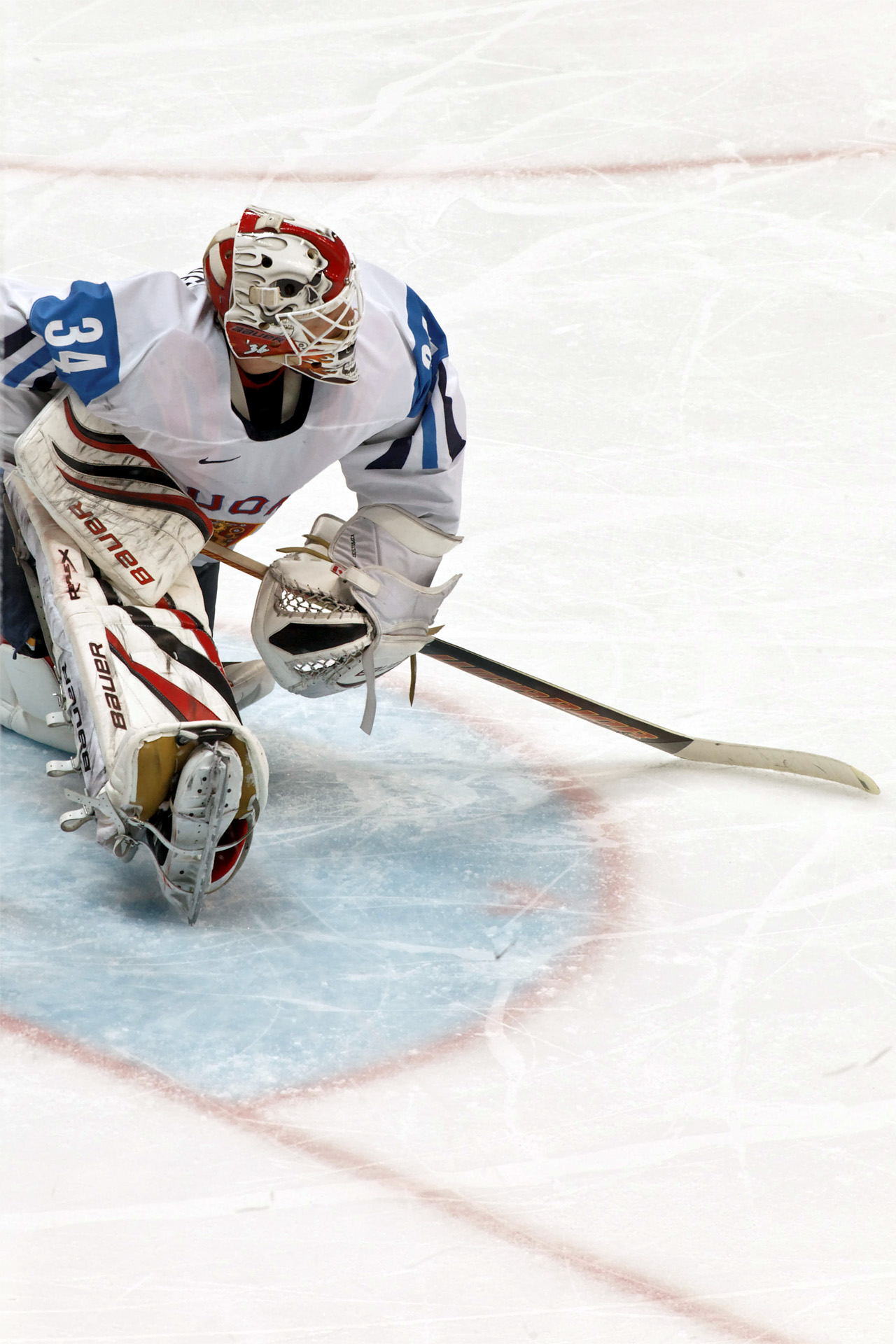
Miikka Kiprusoff played five games at the 2010 Winter Olympics.

Goaltenders
Player	Olympics	Tournament(s)	GP	W	L	T	Min	SO	GA	GAA	Medals	Notes	Ref(s)
Niklas Bäckström	1	2010	2	1	1	0	–	1	2	–	Bronze (2010)		
Jani Hurme	1	2002	3	1	2	0	–	0	9	–			
Markus Ketterer	1	1992	3	2	1	0	–	0	8	–			
Miikka Kiprusoff	1	2010	5	3	2	0	–	–	11	–	Bronze (2010)		
Antero Kivelä	1	1980	3	1	1	1	–	0	10	–			
Mikko Koskinen	1	2018	5	3	2	0	297	0	8	1.62			
Juhani Lahtinen	2	1960, 1964	11	5	6	0	–	0	40	–			
Kari Lehtonen	1	2014	2	1	1	0	–	0	3	–	Bronze (2014)		
Antti Leppänen	1	1976	5	2	3	0	–	0	18	–			
Pekka Myllylä	1	1952	8	2	6	0	–	–	–	–			
Jarmo Myllys	3	1988, 1994, 1998	14	10	3	1	–	–	22	–	Silver (1988); Bronze (1994); Bronze (1998)		
Esko Niemi	1	1960	3	1	1	1	–	0	16	–			
Antero Niittymäki	1	2006	6	5	1	0	–	0	8	–	Silver (2006)		
Fredrik Norrena	1	2006	2	2	0	0	–	0	0	–	Silver (2006)		
Pasi Nurminen	1	2002	1	1	0	0	–	0	1	–			
Tuukka Rask	1	2014	4	3	1	0	–	0	7	–	Bronze (2014)		
Ari Sulander	1	1998	3	2	1	0	–	0	11	–	Bronze (1998)		
Kari Takko	1	1994	5	1	3	1	–	–	22	–			
Jukka Tammi	3	1988, 1992, 1994	10	5	4	1	–	–	24	–	Silver (1988); Bronze (1994)		
Jorma Valtonen	3	1972, 1980, 1984	14	7	7	0	–	–	50	–		IIHFHOF (1999)	
Unto Wiitala	1	1952	–	–	–	–	–	–	–	–		IIHFHOF (2003) (Note: Inducted as a referee)	
Urpo Ylönen	2	1968, 1976	12	6	5	1	–	–	31	–		IIHFHOF (1997)	

== Skaters ==
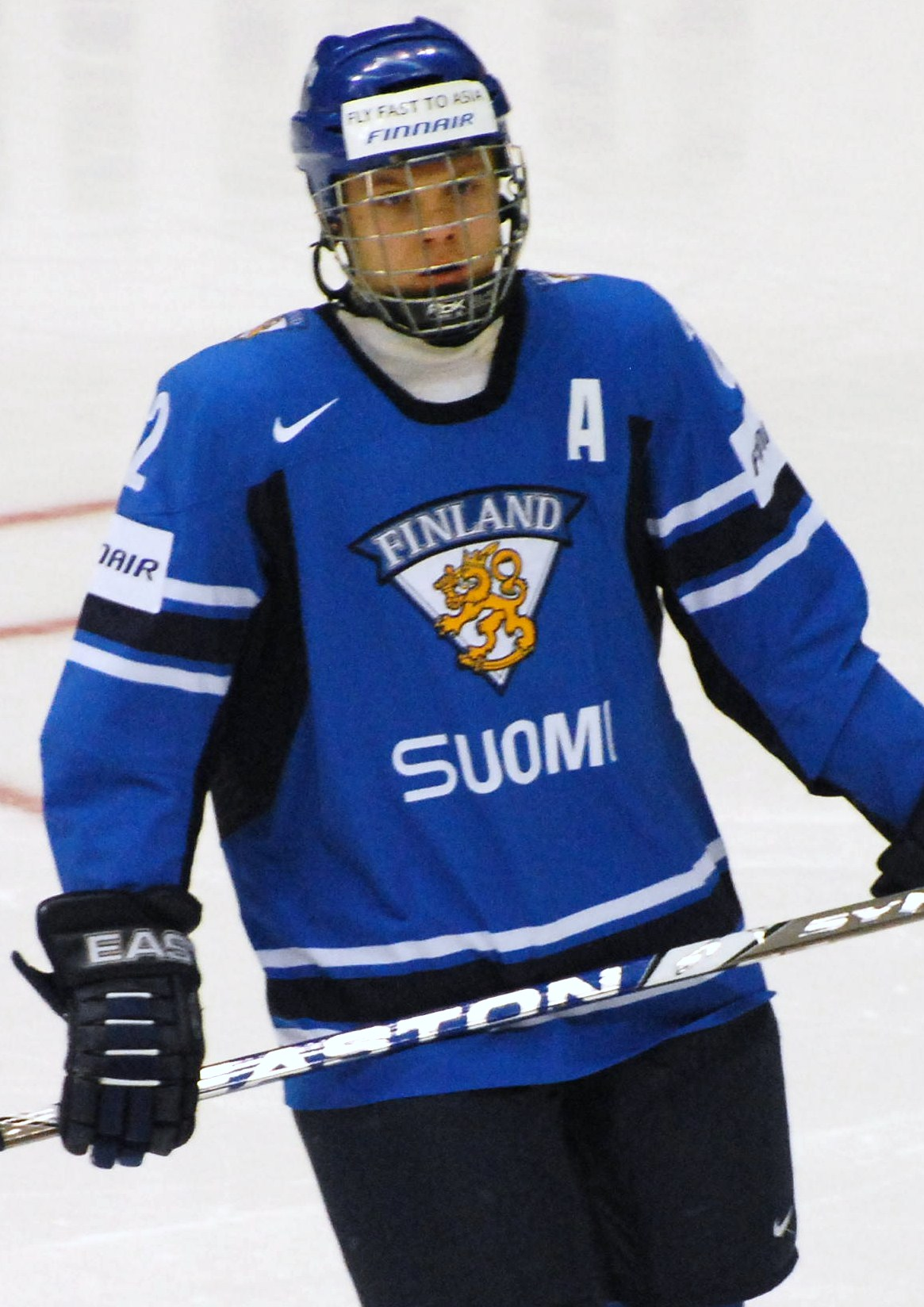
Mikael Granlund scored 7 points at the 2014 Winter Olympics.

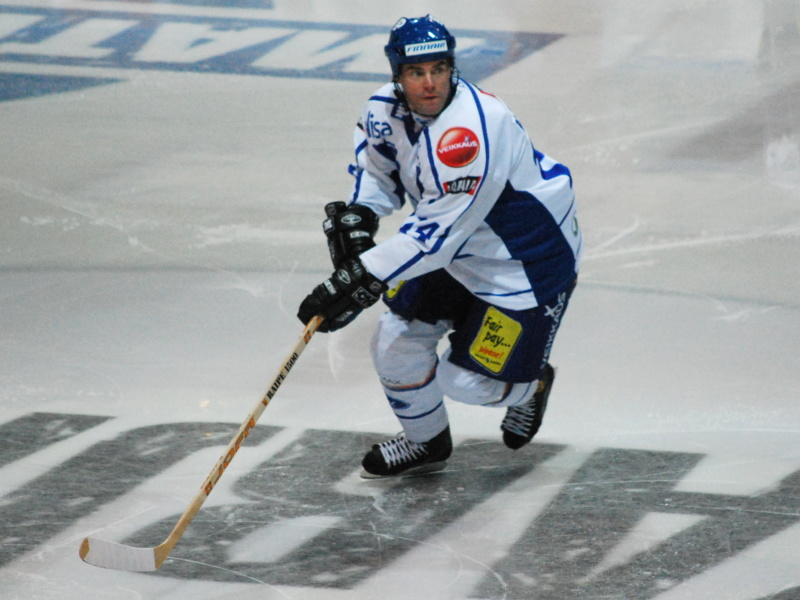
Raimo Helminen appeared in six Winter Olympics, playing 39 games.

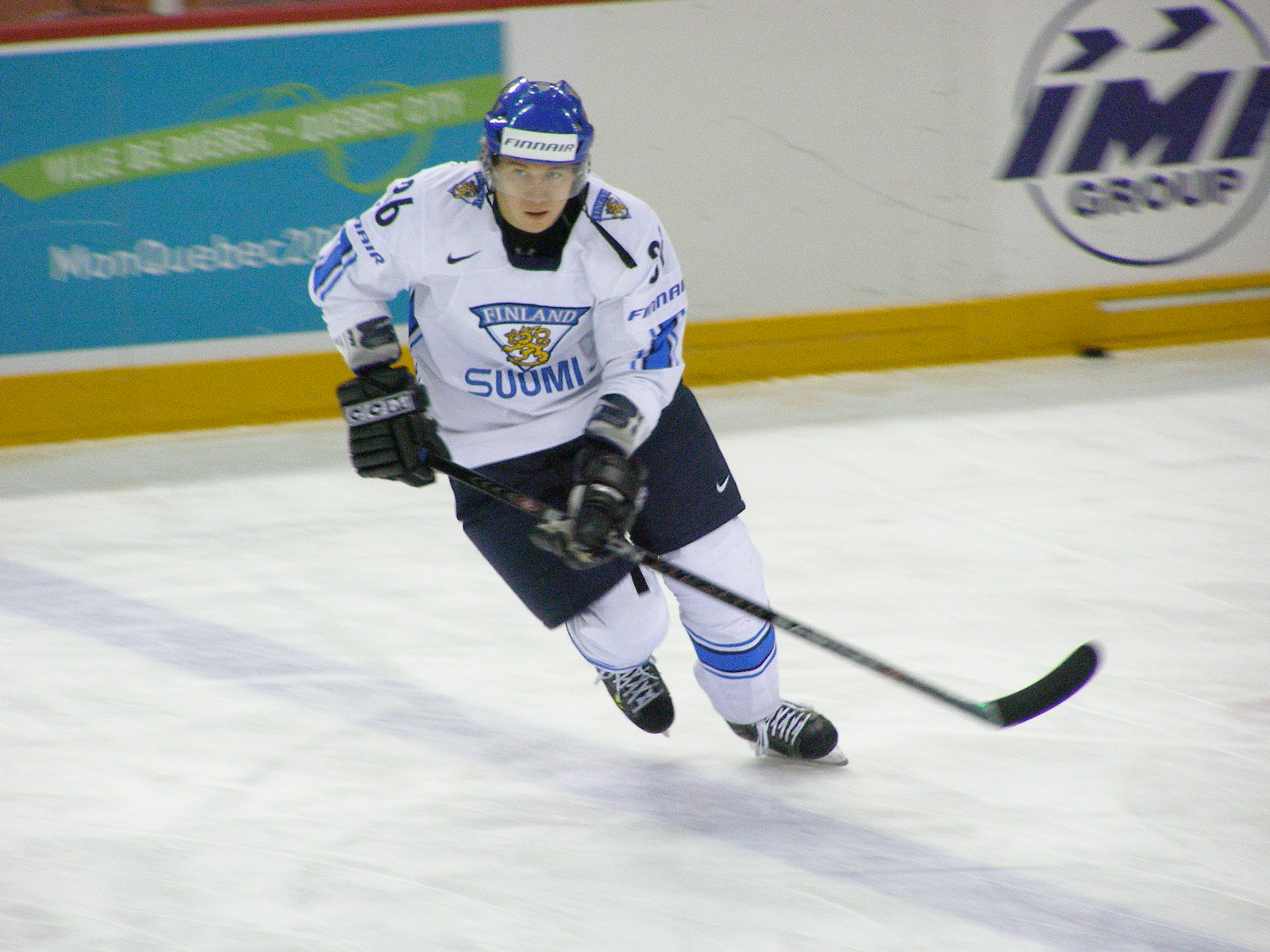
Jussi Jokinen played at both the 2006 and 2014 Winter Olympics.

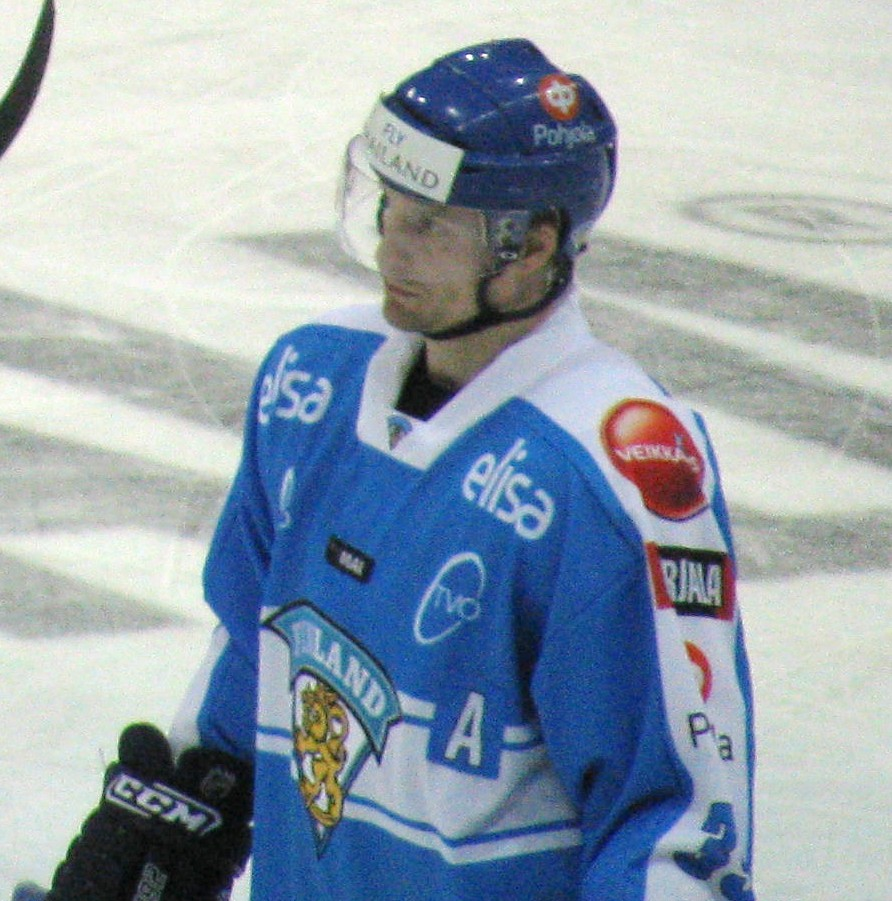
Niko Kapanen played in two Winter Olympics, scoring 5 points in 14 games.

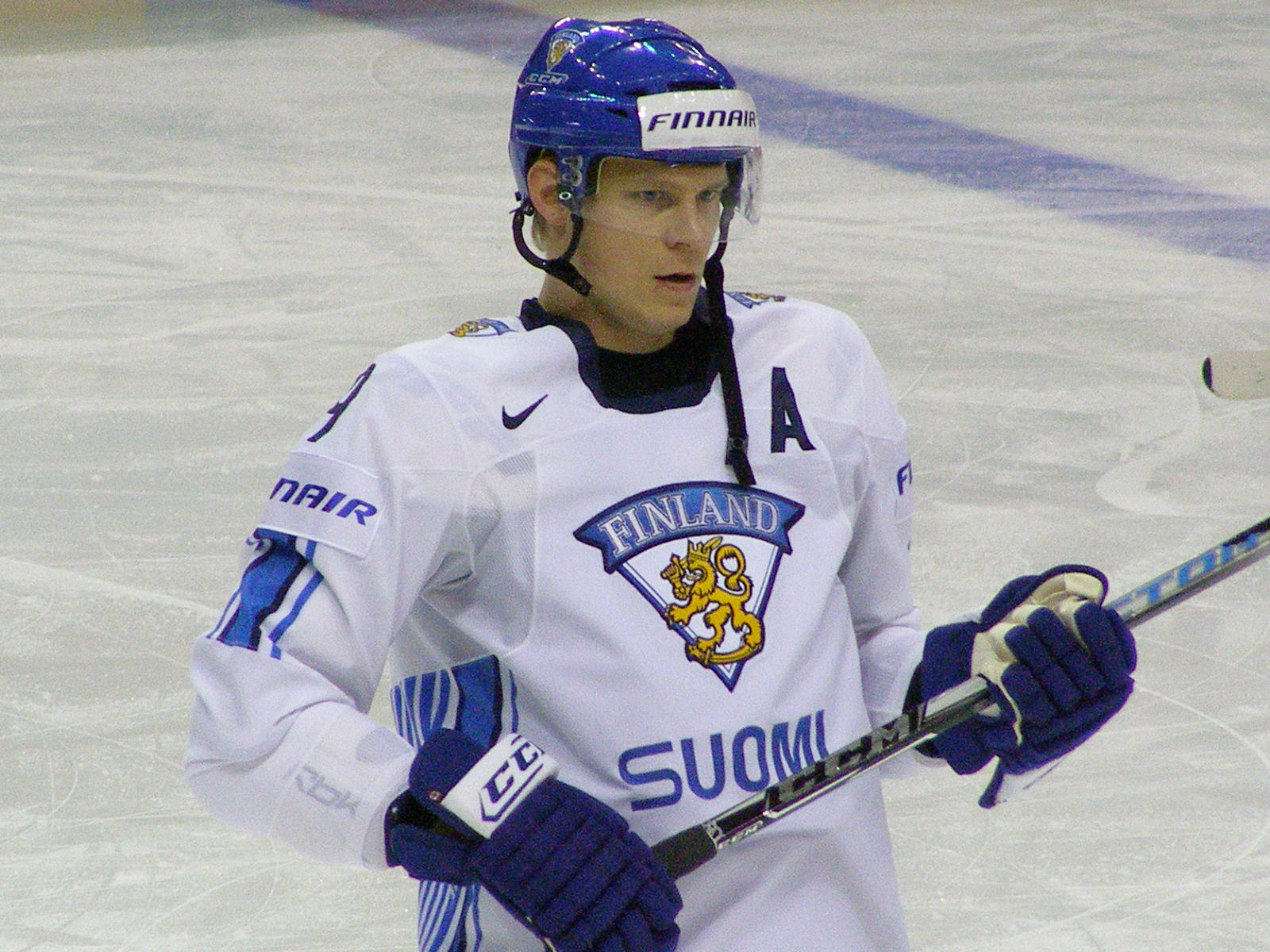
Mikko Koivu played at the 2006 and 2010 Winter Olympics.

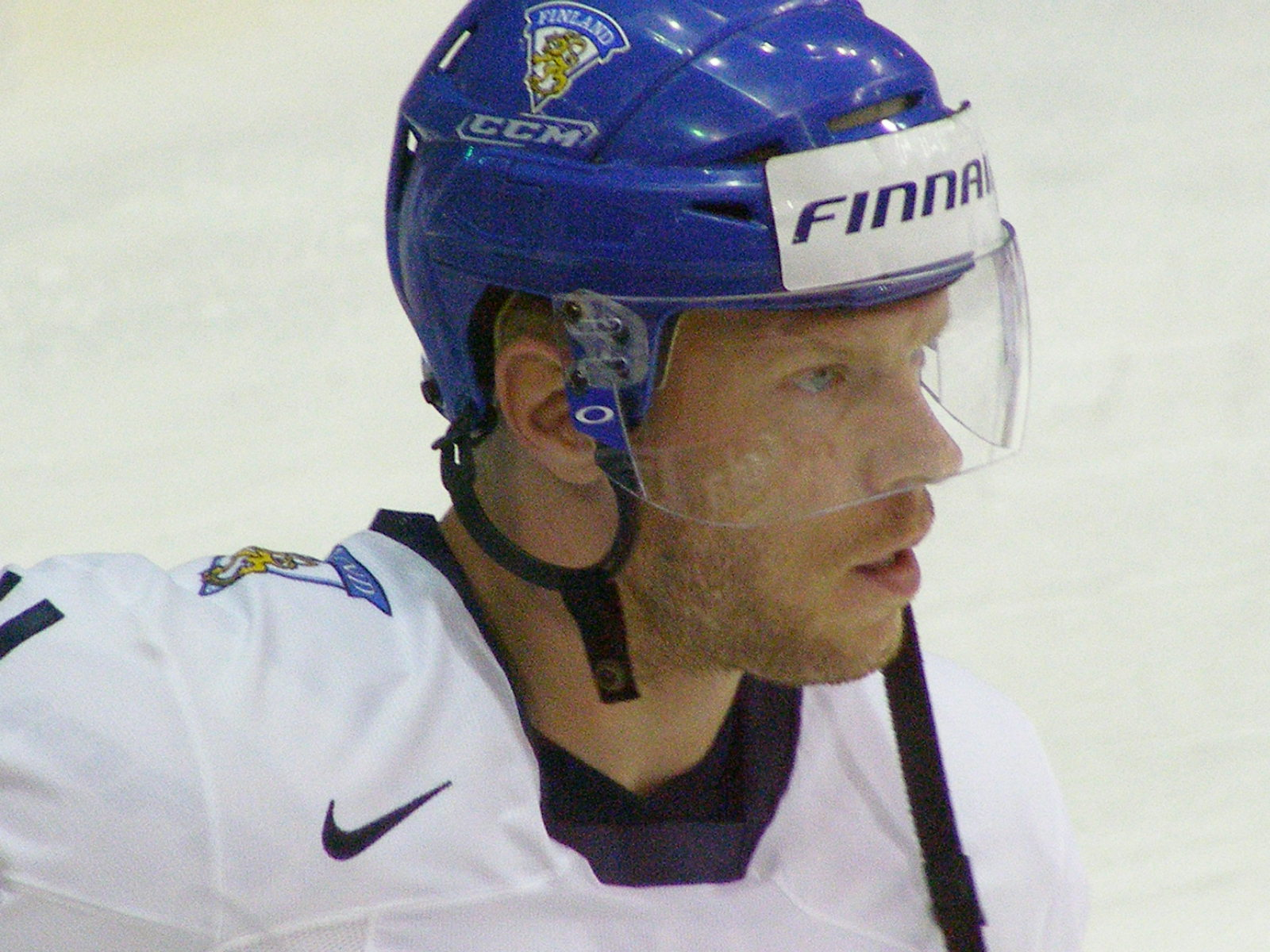
Saku Koivu scored 30 points over four Winter Olympics.

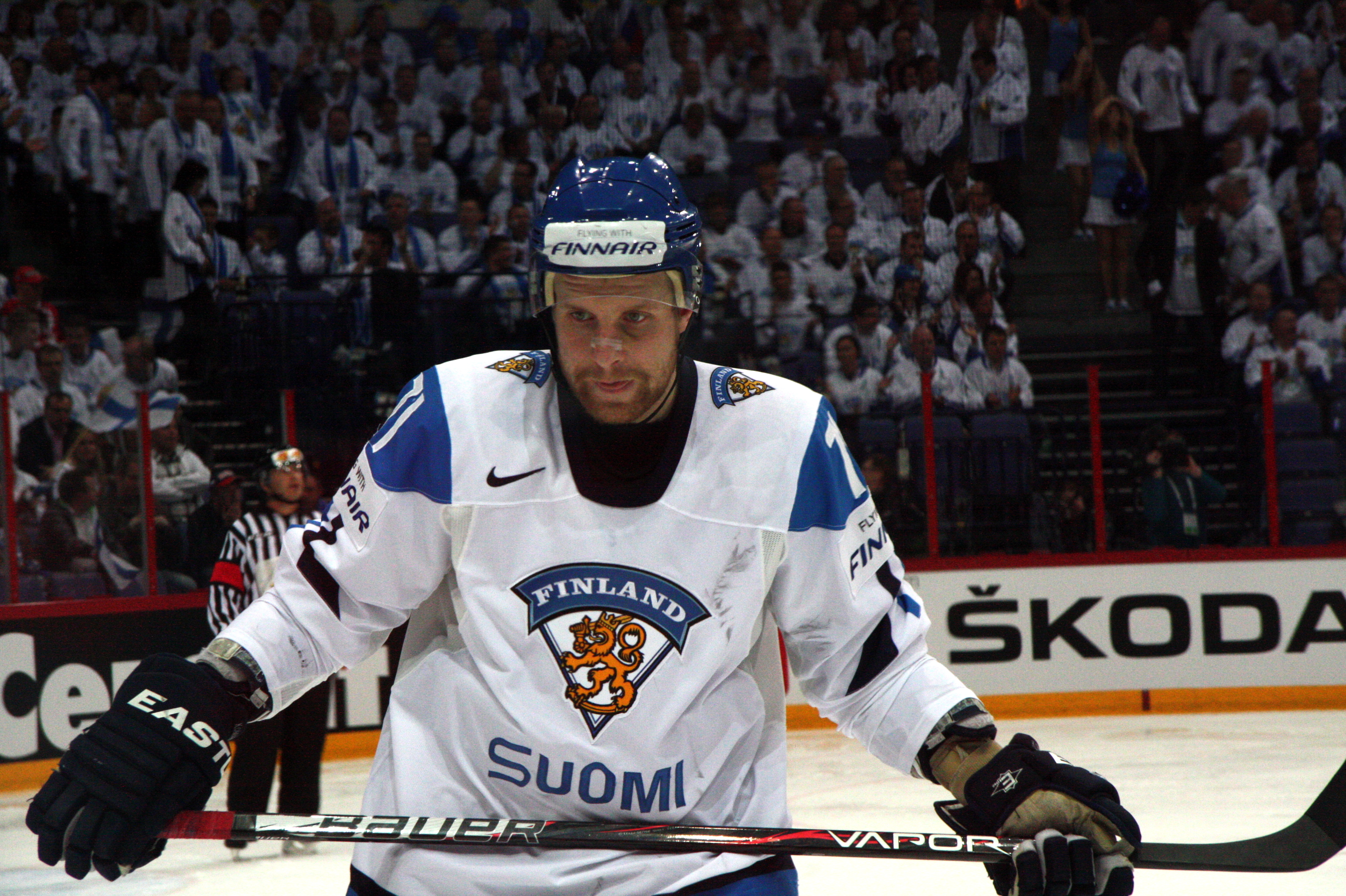
Leo Komarov played at the 2014 Winter Olympics.

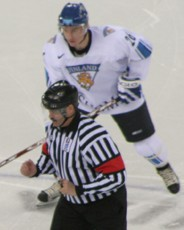
Jere Lehtinen took part in five Winter Olympics.

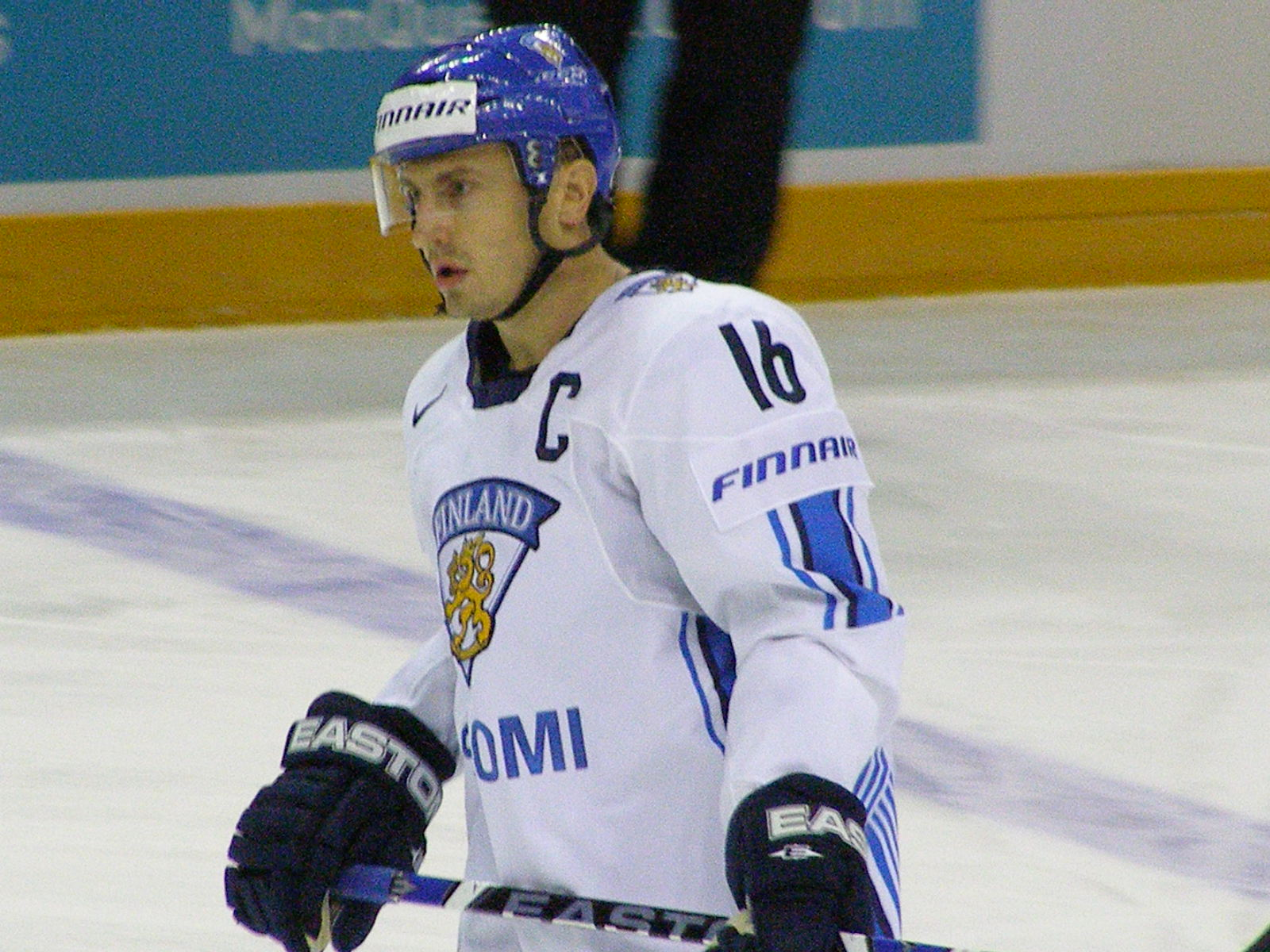
Ville Peltonen played in four Winter Olympics.

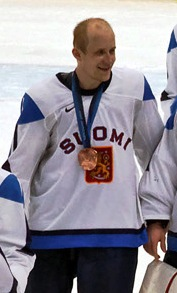
Sami Salo played at four Winter Olympics.

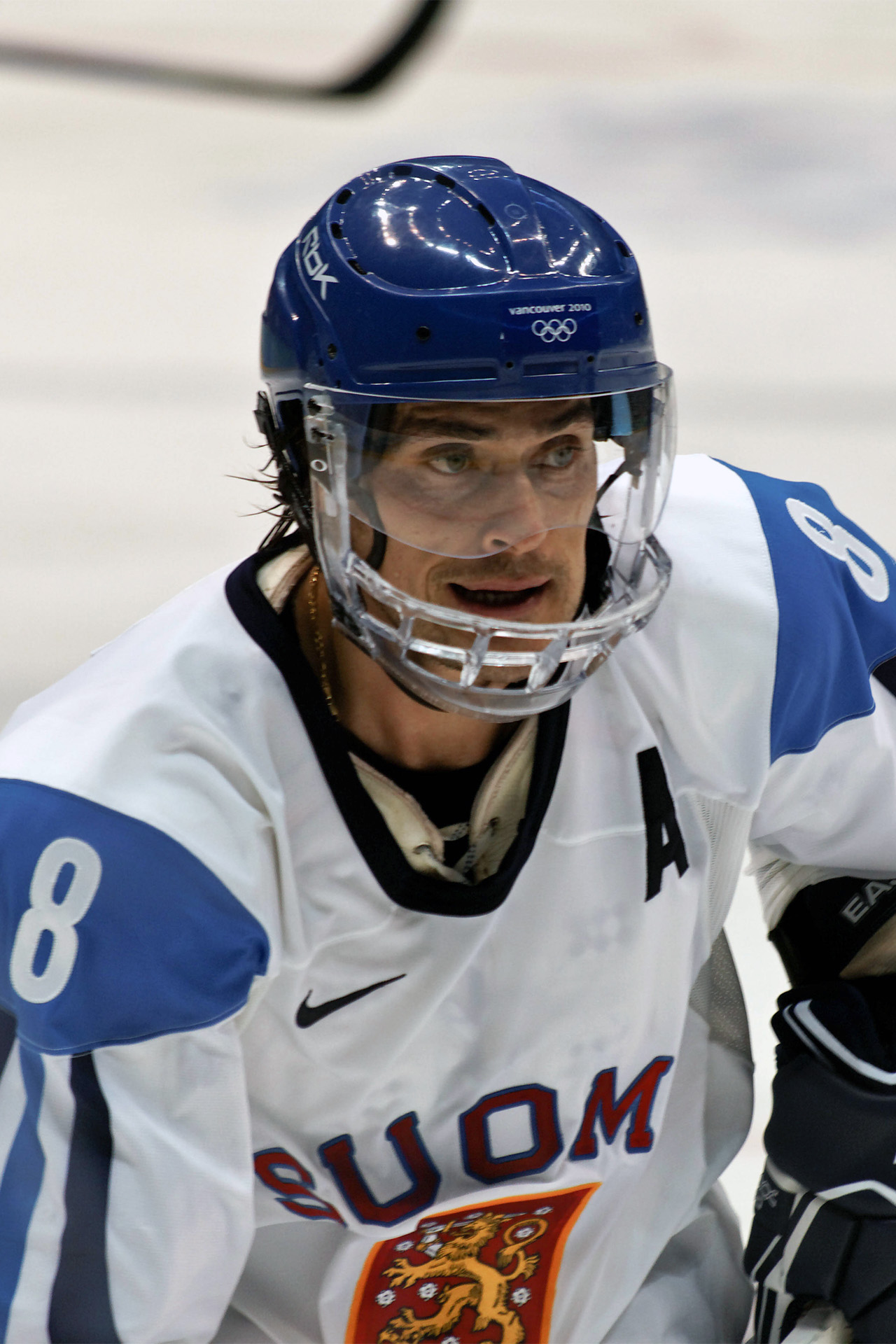
Teemu Selänne played in six Winter Olympics, setting team records for most goals and points.

Skaters
Player	Olympics	Tournament(s)	GP	G	A	P	PIM	Medals	Notes	Ref(s)
Antti Aalto	1	2002	4	0	0	0	4			
Juhamatti Aaltonen	1	2014	4	1	0	1	2	Bronze (2014)		
Seppo Ahokainen	1	1976	6	1	4	5	6			
Mika Alatalo	1	1994	7	2	1	3	2	Bronze (1994)		
Marko Anttila	1	2018	2	0	1	1	2			
Aleksander Barkov	1	2014	2	0	1	1	2	Bronze (2014)		
Aki Berg	3	1998, 2002, 2006	18	1	0	1	12	Bronze (1998); Silver (2006)		
Timo Blomqvist	2	1988, 1992	16	1	2	3	18	Silver (1988)		
Kari Eloranta	3	1980, 1988, 1992	23	0	12	12	6	Silver (1988)		
Mikko Eloranta	1	2002	4	2	0	2	2			
Jonas Enlund	1	2018	5	0	0	0	0			
Valtteri Filppula	1	2010	6	3	0	3	0	Bronze (2010)		
Mikael Granlund	1	2014	6	3	4	7	4	Bronze (2014)		
Tuomas Grönman	1	1998	6	0	0	0	2	Bronze (1998)		
Hannu Haapalainen	2	1976, 1980	12	1	1	2	8			
Matti Hagman	1	1976	6	1	4	5	2			
Niklas Hagman	3	2002, 2006, 2010	18	5	5	10	4	Silver (2006); Bronze (2010)		
Yrjö Hakala	2	1952, 1960	13	3	3	6	2			
Markku Hakulinen	1	1980	7	2	4	6	2			
Erik Hämäläinen	1	1994	8	1	0	1	8	Bronze (1994)		
Matti Harju	1	1968	8	3	2	5	2			
Teemu Hartikainen	1	2018	4	0	1	1	0			
Miro Heiskanen	1	2018	5	1	0	1	2			
Raimo Helminen	6	1984, 1988, 1992, 1994, 1998, 2002	39	6	18	24	16	Silver (1988); Bronze (1994); Bronze (1998)	IIHFHOF (2012)	
Jukka Hentunen	1	2006	8	0	0	0	2	Silver (2006)		
Juuso Hietanen	2	2014, 2018	11	2	1	3	4	Bronze (2014)		
Erkki Hytönen	2	1952	1	0	0	0	0			
Jarkko Immonen	2	2010, 2014	7	2	0	2	2	Bronze (2010); Bronze (2014)		
Pentti Isotalo	1	1952	8	0	0	0	2			
Risto Jalo	1	1984	6	2	6	8	4			
Heikki Järn	1	1972	5	2	0	2	2			
Hannu Järvenpää	1	1992	8	5	6	11	14			
Iiro Järvi	1	1988	8	2	5	7	10	Silver (1988)		
Arto Javanainen	1	1984	5	2	3	5	4			
Kari Johansson	1	1968	8	0	0	0	4			
Jussi Jokinen	2	2006, 2014	14	3	6	9	2	Silver (2006); Bronze (2014)		
Olli Jokinen	4	2002, 2006, 2010, 2014	24	13	6	19	6	Silver (2006); Bronze (2010); Bronze (2014)		
Julius Junttila	1	2018	5	0	1	1	0			
Timo Jutila	3	1984, 1992, 1994	22	3	4	7	16	Bronze (1994)	IIHFHOF (2003)	
Tomi Kallio	1	2002	4	1	2	3	2			
Esko Kaonpää	1	1964	2	0	0	0	0			
Hannu Kapanen	1	1976	6	1	3	4	4			
Niko Kapanen	2	2006, 2010	14	2	3	5	2	Silver (2006); Bronze (2010)		
Sami Kapanen	3	1994, 1998, 2002	18	2	3	5	6	Bronze (1994); Bronze (1998)		
Ossi Kauppi	1	1952	8	0	0	0	0			
Matti Keinonen	2	1968, 1972	13	6	1	7	16		IIHFHOF (2002)	
Joonas Kemppainen	1	2018	5	2	2	4	2			
Esa Keskinen	2	1988, 1994	16	3	5	8	6	Silver (1988); Bronze (1994)		
Veli-Pekka Ketola	2	1968, 1972	14	4	6	10	17			
Markku Kiimalainen	1	1980	7	1	6	7	4			
Raimo Kilpiö	2	1960, 1964	14	10	6	16	4			
Marko Kiprusoff	1	1994	8	3	3	6	4	Bronze (1994)		
Tommi Kivistö	1	2018	4	0	0	0	0			
Erkki Koiso	1	1952	5	0	2	2	13			
Miika Koivisto	1	2018	5	0	1	1	2			
Mikko Koivu	2	2006, 2010	14	0	4	4	8	Silver (2006); Bronze (2010)		
Saku Koivu	4	1994, 1998, 2006, 2010	28	9	21	30	34	Bronze (1994); Bronze (1998); Silver (2006); Bronze (2010)	IIHFHOF (2017)	
Pertti Koivulahti	1	1976	6	2	3	5	0			
Leo Komarov	1	2014	6	0	0	0	0	Bronze (2014)		
Petri Kontiola	2	2014, 2018	11	3	8	11	6	Bronze (2014)		
Lauri Korpikoski	1	2014	6	2	2	4	1	Bronze (2014)		
Ilpo Koskela	2	1968, 1972	14	1	3	4	2			
Jukka Koskilahti	1	1980	7	1	0	1	0			
Hannu Koskinen	1	1980	7	1	1	2	2			
Tapio Koskinen	1	1976	6	2	0	2	0			
Jarno Koskiranta	1	2018	5	0	2	2	0			
Lasse Kukkonen	4	2006, 2010, 2014, 2018	19	1	1	2	8	Silver (2006); Bronze (2010); Bronze (2014)		
Jari Kurri	2	1980, 1998	13	3	5	8	8	Bronze (1998)	HHOF (2001); IIHFHOF (2000)	
Keijo Kuusela	1	1952	8	4	1	5	2			
Pekka Kuusisto	1	1968	5	0	0	0	12			
Antti Laaksonen	1	2006	8	0	0	0	6	Silver (2006)		
Erkki Laine	2	1984, 1988	14	4	6	10	6	Silver (1988)		
Kari Laitinen	1	1988	8	3	2	5	0	Silver (1988)		
Jani Lajunen	1	2018	4	0	1	1	6			
Reijo Laksola	1	1976	6	1	1	2	4			
Matti Lampainen	1	1960	6	2	0	2	4			
Janne Laukkanen	3	1992, 1994, 1998	22	0	3	3	22	Bronze (1994); Bronze (1998)		
Harri Laurila	1	1992	8	0	0	0	2			
Jori Lehterä	1	2014	6	1	3	4	0	Bronze (2014)		
Tero Lehterä	1	1994	6	0	1	1	0	Bronze (1994)		
Jere Lehtinen	5	1994, 1998, 2002, 2006, 2010	32	11	9	20	4	Bronze (1994); Bronze (1998); Silver (2006); Bronze (2010)	IIHFHOF (2018)	
Rauno Lehtiö	1	1964	8	1	1	2	0			
Markus Lehto	1	1984	6	1	1	2	2			
Petteri Lehto	1	1984	6	2	2	4	10			
Erkki Lehtonen	1	1988	8	4	6	10	2	Silver (1988)		
Mikko Lehtonen	1	2018	1	0	0	0	0			
Pertti Lehtonen	1	1984	6	0	1	1	6			
Pekka Leimu	1	1968	7	3	1	4	4			
Mikko Leinonen	1	1980	7	6	4	10	0			
Sami Lepistö	3	2010, 2014, 2018	17	3	5	8	10	Bronze (2010); Bronze (2014)		
Henry Leppä	1	1976	6	3	3	6	0			
Reijo Leppänen	1	1980	6	5	4	9	0			
Tapio Levo	1	1980	6	1	4	5	1			
Juha Lind	2	1998, 2002	10	0	1	1	6	Bronze (1998)		
Jari Lindroos	1	1992	8	0	4	4	6			
Seppo Lindström	3	1968, 1972, 1976	19	0	4	4	10			
Harri Linnonmaa	1	1972	5	1	1	2	0			
Lasse Litma	1	1980	7	0	4	4	10			
Jyrki Lumme	3	1988, 1998, 2002	16	1	2	3	18	Silver (1988); Bronze (1998)		
Esko Luostarinen	2	1960, 1964	13	5	2	7	6			
Toni Lydman	2	2006, 2010	14	1	0	1	12	Silver (2006); Bronze (2010)		
Olli Määttä	1	2014	6	3	2	5	0	Bronze (2014)		
Mikko Mäkelä	2	1992, 1994	13	5	6	11	4	Bronze (1994)		
Kauko Mäkinen	1	1952	1	0	0	0	0			
Jarmo Mäkitalo	2	1980, 1984	13	3	2	5	2			
Sakari Manninen	1	2018	5	2	1	3	0			
Pekka Marjamäki	2	1972, 1976	11	2	1	3	4		IIHFHOF (1998)	
Anssi Melametsä	1	1984	6	4	3	7	10			
Ilkka Mesikämmen	1	1964	8	1	1	2	0			
Antti Miettinen	1	2010	5	1	0	1	0	Bronze (2010)		
Reijo Mikkolainen	1	1988	8	4	1	5	10	Silver (1988)		
Lauri Mononen	1	1972	5	7	0	7	6			
Matti Murto	2	1972, 1976	11	4	4	8	4			
Antti-Jussi Niemi	1	2006	8	0	0	0	2	Silver (2006)		
Mika Nieminen	3	1992, 1994, 1998	22	8	13	21	8	Bronze (1994); Bronze (1998)		
Pertti Nieminen	1	1960	6	8	2	10	8			
Ville Nieminen	2	2002, 2006	12	0	2	2	6	Silver (2006)		
Janne Niinimaa	2	1998, 2002	10	0	6	6	10	Bronze (1998)		
Seppo Nikkilä	1	1964	7	2	2	4	0			
Janne Niskala	1	2010	6	0	2	2	2	Bronze (2010)		
Petteri Nummelin	1	2006	8	0	2	2	2	Silver (2006)		
Timo Nummelin	1	1976	5	1	0	1	4			
Kalevi Numminen	2	1960, 1964	14	5	1	6	16		IIHFHOF (2011) (Note: Inducted as a builder)	
Teppo Numminen	4	1988, 1998, 2002, 2006	24	3	8	11	4	Silver (1988); Bronze (1998); Silver (2006)	IIHFHOF (2013)	
Atte Ohtamaa	1	2018	5	0	0	0	0			
Janne Ojanen	2	1988, 1994	16	6	3	9	12	Silver (1988); Bronze (1994)		
Hannu Oksanen	1	1984	6	0	0	0	0			
Lasse Oksanen	3	1964, 1968, 1972	22	10	3	13	6		IIHFHOF (1999)	
Oskar Osala	1	2018	2	0	1	1	0			
Marko Palo	1	1994	8	2	3	5	4	Bronze (1994)		
Lalli Partinen	1	1968	8	0	0	0	2			
Jukka Peltola	1	2018	4	0	1	1	2			
Timo Peltomaa	1	1992	8	0	0	0	2			
Esa Peltonen	4	1968, 1972, 1976, 1980	27	5	9	14	8		IIHFHOF (2007)	
Jorma Peltonen	3	1964, 1968, 1972	18	6	4	10	6			
Ville Peltonen	4	1994, 1998, 2006, 2010	26	10	10	20	12	Bronze (1994); Bronze (1998); Silver (2006); Bronze (2010)	IIHFHOF (2016)	
Antti Pihlström	1	2014	5	0	0	0	0	Bronze (2014)		
Joni Pitkänen	1	2010	5	1	2	3	29	Bronze (2010)		
Jukka Porvari	1	1980	7	7	4	11	4			
Heino Pulli	2	1960, 1964	14	11	6	17	6			
Mika Pyörälä	1	2018	5	1	0	1	0			
Juha Rantasila	2	1968, 1972	11	4	2	6	8			
Christian Rapp	1	1952	6	5	0	5	0			
Kalevi Rassa	1	1960	4	0	1	1	0			
Teppo Rastio	1	1960	5	4	2	6	4			
Matti Rautiainen	1	1976	6	6	1	7	0			
Esko Rekomaa	2	1952	1	0	0	0	0			
Seppo Repo	1	1972	4	0	0	0	4			
Matti Reunamäki	2	1964, 1968	16	4	2	6	7			
Heikki Riihiranta	1	1972	6	1	1	2	2			
Matti Rintakoski	1	1952	8	0	0	0	2			
Kimmo Rintanen	1	1998	6	1	0	1	0	Bronze (1998)		
Arto Ruotanen	3	1984, 1988, 1992	22	0	7	7	12	Silver (1988)		
Reijo Ruotsalainen	1	1988	8	4	2	6	0	Silver (1988)		
Jarkko Ruutu	3	2002, 2006, 2010	18	2	1	3	49	Silver (2006); Bronze (2010)		
Tuomo Ruutu	2	2010, 2014	12	2	4	6	4	Bronze (2010); Bronze (2014)		
Eero Saari	1	1952	8	0	1	1	0			
Timo Saari	1	1976	6	0	0	0	8			
Timo Saarikoski	1	1992	8	0	0	0	0			
Olli Saarinen	1	1980	7	0	1	1	4			
Simo Saarinen	3	1984, 1988, 1992	19	1	3	4	24	Silver (1988)		
Keijo Säilynoja	1	1992	8	1	0	1	4			
Eero Salisma	1	1952	7	0	4	4	0			
Jorma Salmi	1	1960	4	1	2	3	0			
Sakari Salminen	1	2014	2	0	0	0	4	Bronze (2014)		
Sami Salo	4	2002, 2006, 2010, 2014	22	2	5	7	4	Silver (2006); Bronze (2010); Bronze (2014)		
Veli-Matti Savinainen	1	2018	5	1	1	2	2			
Jouni Seistamo	2	1960, 1964	13	8	4	12	8			
Teemu Selänne	6	1992, 1998, 2002, 2006, 2010, 2014	37	24	19	43	24	Bronze (1998); Silver (2006); Bronze (2010); Bronze (2014)	HHOF (2017); IIHFHOF (2017)	
Lauri Silván	1	1952	8	3	1	4	0			
Ville Sirén	2	1984, 1992	14	0	3	3	18			
Arto Sirviö	1	1984	6	3	0	3	0			
Petri Skriko	2	1984, 1992	14	7	8	15	12			
Voitto Soini	1	1960	4	3	0	3	6			
Pasi Sormunen	1	1994	7	0	0	0	10	Bronze (1994)		
Mika Strömberg	1	1994	7	2	2	4	10	Bronze (1994)		
Kai Suikkanen	1	1988	8	1	0	1	4	Silver (1988)		
Raimo Summanen	2	1984, 1992	14	6	7	13	10			
Jorma Suokko	1	1964	8	1	1	2	2			
Seppo Suoraniemi	1	1980	7	1	3	4	6			
Timo Susi	2	1980, 1988	15	2	6	8	8	Silver (1988)		
Juhani Tamminen	1	1972	6	1	3	4	6			
Esa Tikkanen	1	1998	6	1	1	2	0	Bronze (1998)		
Kimmo Timonen	5	1998, 2002, 2006, 2010, 2014	30	3	10	13	8	Bronze (1998); Silver (2006); Bronze (2010); Bronze (2014)		
Paavo Tirkkonen	1	1998	6	0	0	0	0			
Eeli Tolvanen	1	2018	5	3	6	9	4			
Jari Torkki	1	1988	8	1	0	1	2	Silver (1988)		
Antti Törmänen	1	1998	6	0	0	0	0	Bronze (1998)		
Harri Tuohimaa	1	1984	6	3	2	5	8			
Pekka Tuomisto	2	1988, 1992	16	5	2	7	10	Silver (1988)		
Timo Turunen	1	1972	5	2	5	7	2			
Ossi Väänänen	2	2002, 2014	8	0	3	3	0	Bronze (2014)		
Seppo Vainio	1	1960	2	0	0	0	4			
Petri Varis	1	1994	6	1	1	2	2	Bronze (1994)		
Sami Vatanen	1	2014	6	0	5	5	0	Bronze (2014)		
Jorma Vehmanen	2	1972, 1976	8	5	2	7	2			
Ismo Villa	1	1980	7	1	0	1	0			
Hannu Virta	1	1994	8	2	1	3	2	Bronze (1994)		
Jukka Virtanen	1	1988	8	0	1	1	0	Silver (1988)		
Juhani Wahlsten	3	1960, 1964, 1968	22	8	4	12	8		IIHFHOF (2006)	
Jarmo Wasama	1	1964	8	0	1	1	6			
Jukka Wuolio	1	1952	7	1	2	3	2			
Juha Ylönen	2	1998, 2002	10	0	1	1	10	Bronze (1998)		
