= Speed skating at the 1980 Winter Olympics – Men's 500 metres =

Speed skating at the Olympics

Men's 500 metres at the XIII Olympic Winter Games
- Pictogram for speed skating
- Venue: James B. Sheffield Olympic Skating Rink
- Dates: February 15, 1980
- Competitors: 37 from 18 nations
- Winning time: 38.03 OR

Medalists
1st place, gold medalist(s)		Eric Heiden	United States
2nd place, silver medalist(s)		Yevgeny Kulikov	Soviet Union
3rd place, bronze medalist(s)		Lieuwe de Boer	Netherlands

The men's 500 metres in speed skating at the 1980 Winter Olympics took place on 15 February, at the James B. Sheffield Olympic Skating Rink.

== Records ==
Prior to this competition, the existing world and Olympic records were as follows:

World record	Yevgeny Kulikov (URS)	37.00	Alma-Ata, Kazakh SSR, Soviet Union	29 March 1975
Olympic record	Yevgeny Kulikov (URS)	39.17	Innsbruck, Austria	10 February 1976

The following new Olympic record was set.

Date	Pair	Athlete	Country	Time	OR	WR
15 February	Pair 1	Eric Heiden	United States	38.03	OR	

== Results ==
Rank	Pair	Lane	Athlete	Country	Time	Difference	Notes
1st place, gold medalist(s)	1	o	Eric Heiden	United States	38.03		OR
2nd place, silver medalist(s)	1	i	Yevgeny Kulikov	Soviet Union	38.37	+0.34	
3rd place, bronze medalist(s)	5	o	Lieuwe de Boer	Netherlands	38.48	+0.45	
4	2	o	Frode Rønning	Norway	38.66	+0.63	
5	6	i	Dan Immerfall	United States	38.69	+0.66	
6	5	i	Jarle Pedersen	Norway	38.83	+0.80	
7	2	i	Anatoly Medennikov	Soviet Union	38.88	+0.85	
8	3	o	Gaétan Boucher	Canada	38.90	+0.87	
9	19	i	Jan Józwik	Poland	39.01	+0.98	
10	7	i	Jan-Åke Carlberg	Sweden	39.03	+1.00	
11	8	o	Steffen Doering	East Germany	39.06	+1.03	
12	3	i	Oloph Granath	Sweden	39.15	+1.12	
13	16	i	Andreas Dietel	East Germany	39.21	+1.18	
14	6	o	Kaoru Fukuda	Japan	39.24	+1.21	
15	17	o	Sergey Khlebnikov	Soviet Union	39.25	+1.22	
16	9	o	Kai Arne Engelstad	Norway	39.30	+1.27	
16	4	i	Bert de Jong	Netherlands	39.30	+1.27	
18	9	o	Jukka Salmela	Finland	39.32	+1.29	
19	14	o	Lee Yeong-Ha	South Korea	39.33	+1.30	
20	10	o	Kazuaki Ichimura	Japan	39.44	+1.41	
21	10	i	Emmanuel Michon	France	39.47	+1.44	
22	15	i	Pertti Niittylä	Finland	39.54	+1.51	
23	14	i	Wang Nianchun	China	39.73	+1.70	
24	4	o	Jim Chapin	United States	39.74	+1.71	
25	13	o	Esa Puolakka	Finland	39.76	+1.73	
26	5	i	Jacques Thibault	Canada	40.11	+2.08	
27	15	o	Vasile Coroş	Romania	40.30	+2.27	
28	7	o	Hilbert van der Duim	Netherlands	40.42	+2.39	
28	11	i	Giovanni Paganin	Italy	40.42	+2.39	
30	13	i	Dezideriu Jenei	Romania	40.84	+2.81	
31	11	o	Zhao Weichang	China	41.18	+3.15	
32	12	o	Mike Richmond	Australia	41.22	+3.19	
33	16	o	Su He	China	41.26	+3.23	
34	17	i	Dorjiin Tsenddoo	Mongolia	41.68	+3.65	
35	18	o	Tömörbaataryn Nyamdavaa	Mongolia	42.41	+4.38	
36	8	i	Johan Granath	Sweden	1:21.44	+43.41	Fall
-	12	i	Archie Marshall	Great Britain	DQ		
