= Haapalainen =

Haapalainen is a Finnish surname. Notable people with the surname include:

- Eero Haapalainen (1880–1937), Finnish Communist leader
- Hannu Haapalainen (1951–2011), Finnish ice hockey player
- Jari Haapalainen (born 1971), Swedish musician, songwriter, and producer
- Väinö Haapalainen (1893–1945), Finnish viola player, composer, and music teacher
