= Mäkitalo =

Mäkitalo is a Finnish surname. Notable people with the surname include:

- Mika Mäkitalo (born 1985), Finnish footballer
- Östen Mäkitalo (1938–2011), Swedish electrical engineer
- Tom Makitalo (born 1995), Swedish ice hockey player
