= Tom Mäkitalo =

Swedish ice hockey player

- Born: May 6, 1995 (age 30) Falun, Sweden
- Height: 5 ft 10 in (178 cm)
- Weight: 190 lb (86 kg; 13 st 8 lb)
- Position: Centre
- Shoots: Left
- SHL team: Leksands IF
- NHL draft: Undrafted
- Playing career: 2014–present

Tom Mäkitalo (born May 6, 1995) is a Swedish ice hockey player. He is currently playing with Leksands IF of the Swedish Hockey League (SHL).

Mäkitalo made his Swedish Hockey League debut playing with Leksands IF during the 2014–15 SHL season.

Mäkitalo's father, Jarmo Mäkitalo, is a Finnish former ice hockey player who played in the Elitserien.

== Career statistics ==
			Regular season					Playoffs
Season	Team	League	GP	G	A	Pts	PIM	GP	G	A	Pts	PIM
2009–10	Falu IF J18	J18 Div.1	9	3	1	4	2	—	—	—	—	—
2009–10	Falu IF J20	J20 Elit	1	0	0	0	0	—	—	—	—	—
2010–11	Falu IF J18	J18 Div.1	3	0	4	4	0	4	2	8	10	—
2010–11	Falu IF J20	J20 Elit	5	1	2	3	0	—	—	—	—	—
2011–12	Leksands IF J18	J18 Elit	18	6	10	16	6	—	—	—	—	—
2011–12	Leksands IF J18	J18 Allsvenskan	15	8	6	14	2	—	—	—	—	—
2011–12	Leksands IF J20	J20 SuperElit	2	0	0	0	0	—	—	—	—	—
2012–13	Leksands IF J18	J18 Elit	3	3	3	6	0	—	—	—	—	—
2012–13	Leksands IF J18	J18 Allsvenskan	4	1	6	7	2	3	1	0	1	2
2012–13	Leksands IF J20	J20 SuperElit	40	8	13	21	2	3	0	0	0	0
2013–14	Leksands IF J20	J20 SuperElit	32	8	19	27	6	5	1	4	5	4
2014–15	Leksands IF J20	J20 SuperElit	41	12	23	35	14	3	1	5	6	0
2014–15	Leksands IF	SHL	4	0	1	1	0	—	—	—	—	—
2015–16	KeuPa HT	Mestis	10	0	4	4	2	—	—	—	—	—
2015–16	Kongsvinger Knights	Norway	30	2	9	11	4	—	—	—	—	—
2016–17	Halmstad HF	Hockeyettan	33	11	6	17	8	—	—	—	—	—
2017–18	Mörrums GoIS IK	Division 2	28	13	26	39	2	12	5	12	17	6
2018–19	Mörrums GoIS IK	Hockeyettan	38	6	29	35	4	—	—	—	—	—
2018–19	Kalmar HC	Hockeyettan	2	1	1	2	2	3	0	1	1	0
2019–20	Mörrums GoIS IK	Hockeyettan	34	5	14	19	12	—	—	—	—	—
2020–21	Mörrums GoIS IK	Hockeyettan	38	2	13	15	4	2	0	0	0	0
2021–22	Olofströms IK	Division 2	37	18	29	47	4	—	—	—	—	—
2022–23	IK Pantern	Division 2	29	13	22	35	2	8	3	2	5	0
2023–24	IK Pantern	Division 2	32	14	29	43	0	10	2	13	15	2
SHL totals			4	0	1	1	0	—	—	—	—	—
Mestis totals			10	0	4	4	2	—	—	—	—	—
Norway totals			30	2	9	11	4	—	—	—	—	—
Hockeyettan totals			145	25	63	88	30	5	0	1	1	0
Division 2 totals			126	58	106	164	8	32	10	27	37	8
