= 1979 World Junior Ice Hockey Championships =

1979 edition of the World Junior Ice Hockey Championships

1979 IIHF World U20 Championship
Tournament details
- Host country: Sweden
- Venue(s): 2 (in 2 host cities)
- Dates: 27 December 1978 – 3 January 1979
- Teams: 8

Final positions
- Champions: Soviet Union (3rd title)
- Runner-up: Czechoslovakia
- Third place: Sweden
- Fourth place: Finland

Tournament statistics
- Games played: 22
- Goals scored: 171 (7.77 per game)
- Scoring leader(s): (Soviet Union) Vladimir Krutov (14 points)

The 1979 World Junior Ice Hockey Championships (1979 WJHC) was the third edition of the Ice Hockey World Junior Championship and was held from 27 December 1978 until 3 January 1979. The tournament was held in Karlstad and Karlskoga, Sweden. The Soviet Union won its third consecutive gold medal, while Czechoslovakia won the silver, and Sweden the bronze.

== Pool A ==
The 1979 tournament divided participants into two divisions of four teams, each playing three games. The top two teams in each division advanced to the championship round, while the bottom two were placed in the consolation round. Each division played another round robin. The top three teams in the championship round won the gold, silver and bronze medals. In the consolation round, the results between teams that faced each other in the preliminary round carried over.

=== Final standings ===
This is the aggregate standings, ordered according to final placing. The four teams in the championship round were ranked one through four, while the four teams in the consolation round were ranked five through eight regardless of overall record.

Pos	Team	Pld	W	L	D	GF	GA	GD	Pts
1	Soviet Union	6	5	0	1	46	11	+35	11
2	Czechoslovakia	6	3	1	2	19	23	−4	8
3	Sweden	6	4	1	1	19	13	+6	9
4	Finland	6	2	4	0	20	19	+1	4
5	Canada	5	3	2	0	23	10	+13	6
6	United States	5	2	3	0	21	23	−2	4
7	West Germany	5	1	4	0	17	26	−9	2
8	Norway	5	0	5	0	6	46	−40	0

Source: Hockey Canada

Norway was relegated to Pool B for the 1980 World Junior Ice Hockey Championships.

=== Preliminary round ===
==== Gold group ====
Team	Pld	W	L	D	GF	GA	GD	Pts
Sweden	3	3	0	0	8	3	+5	6
Finland	3	2	1	0	11	4	+7	4
Canada	3	1	2	0	7	6	+1	2
West Germany	3	0	3	0	5	18	−13	0

Source: Hockey Canada

27 December 1978	Canada	1 – 3 (0–0, 1–2, 0–1)	Finland	Karlstad

27 December 1978	Sweden	5 – 2 (3–0, 1–1, 1–1)	West Germany	Karlstad

28 December 1978	West Germany	2 – 6 (0–2, 1–2, 1–2)	Canada	Karlstad

28 December 1978	Finland	1 – 2 (0–1, 1–1, 0–0)	Sweden	Karlskoga

30 December 1978	Sweden	1 – 0 (0–0, 1–0, 0–0)	Canada	Karlskoga

30 December 1978	Finland	7 – 1 (2–1, 2–0, 3–0)	West Germany	Karlskoga

==== Blue group ====
Team	Pld	W	L	D	GF	GA	GD	Pts
Soviet Union	3	3	0	0	33	2	+31	6
Czechoslovakia	3	2	1	0	10	15	−5	4
United States	3	1	2	0	10	11	−1	2
Norway	3	0	3	0	5	30	−25	0

Source: Hockey Canada

27 December 1978	Soviet Union	17 – 0 (6–0, 1–0, 10–0)	Norway	Karlskoga

27 December 1978	Czechoslovakia	3 – 2 (2–1, 0–1, 1–0)	United States	Karlskoga

28 December 1978	United States	1 – 7 (0–3, 1–4, 0–0)	Soviet Union	Karlskoga

28 December 1978	Norway	4 – 6 (2–1, 2–4, 0–1)	Czechoslovakia	Karlstad

30 December 1978	Soviet Union	9 – 1 (3–1, 5–0, 1–0)	Czechoslovakia	Karlstad

30 December 1978	Norway	1 – 7 (1–1, 0–5, 0–1)	United States	Karlstad

=== Consolation round ===
Results from any games played during the preliminary round were carried forward to the consolation round.

Team	Pld	W	L	D	GF	GA	GD	Pts
Canada	3	3	0	0	22	6	+16	6
United States	3	2	1	0	18	13	+5	4
West Germany	3	1	2	0	14	14	0	2
Norway	3	0	3	0	2	23	−21	0

Source: Hockey Canada

31 December 1978	Canada	10 – 1 (4–0, 3–1, 3–0)	Norway	Karlstad

31 December 1978	United States	8 – 6 (2–1, 3–2, 3–3)	West Germany	Karlskoga

2 January 1979	Canada	6 – 3 (1–0, 4–3, 1–0)	United States	Karlskoga

2 January 1978	Norway	0 – 6 (0–3, 0–2, 0–1)	West Germany	Karlstad

=== Championship round ===
Team	Pld	W	L	D	GF	GA	GD	Pts
Soviet Union	3	2	0	1	13	9	+4	5
Czechoslovakia	3	1	0	2	9	8	+1	4
Sweden	3	1	1	1	11	10	+1	3
Finland	3	0	3	0	9	15	−6	0

Source: Hockey Canada

31 December 1978	Soviet Union	4 – 2 (1–0, 1–2, 2–0)	Finland	Karlstad

31 December 1978	Sweden	1 – 1 (0–0, 0–1, 1–0)	Czechoslovakia	Karlskoga

2 January 1979	Finland	2 – 5 (2–2, 0–2, 0–1)	Sweden	Karlstad

2 January 1979	Soviet Union	2 – 2 (1–1, 1–1, 0–0)	Czechoslovakia	Karlskoga

3 January 1979	Czechoslovakia	6 – 5 (1–1, 3–2, 2–2)	Finland	Karlskoga

3 January 1979	Sweden	5 – 7 (2–2, 2–2, 1–3)	Soviet Union	Karlstad

=== Scoring leaders ===
Rank	Player	Country	G	A	Pts
1	Vladimir Krutov	Soviet Union	8	6	14
2	Anatoli Tarasov	Soviet Union	5	5	10
3	Vyacheslav Ryanov	Soviet Union	6	3	9
4	Georg Holzmann	West Germany	4	4	8
5	Alexander Gerasimov	Soviet Union	2	6	8
6	Andrei Andreyev	Soviet Union	6	1	7
7	Aaron Broten	United States	4	3	7
8	Jarmo Makitalo	Finland	4	3	7
9	Ján Jaško	Czechoslovakia	3	4	7
10	Alexei Kasatonov	Soviet Union	3	4	7
10	Anton Šťastný	Czechoslovakia	3	4	7

=== Tournament awards ===
	IIHF Directorate Awards	Media All-Star Team
Goaltender	(Sweden) Pelle Lindbergh	(Sweden) Pelle Lindbergh
Defencemen	(Soviet Union) Alexei Kasatonov	(Soviet Union) Alexei Kasatonov (Czechoslovakia) Ivan Černý
Forwards	(Soviet Union) Vladimir Krutov	(Sweden) Thomas Steen (Soviet Union) Anatoli Tarasov (Soviet Union) Vladimir Krutov

== Pool B ==
A second tier of the World Junior Championship was contested in Caen, France, from 5 to 9 March 1979. Two groups of four played round robins, followed by placement games where 1st played 1st, etc.. This is the first year a B pool was contested for the under 20s.

=== Preliminary round ===
==== Group A ====
Team	Pld	W	L	D	GF	GA	GD	Pts
France	3	3	0	0	22	8	+14	6
Poland	3	2	1	0	37	12	+25	4
Austria	3	1	2	0	11	15	−4	2
Belgium	3	0	3	0	7	42	−35	0

France	3 – 1 (1–0, 1–1, 1–0)	Austria

Poland	23 – 2 (8–0, 6–2, 9–0)	Belgium

France	9 – 2 (2–2, 5–0, 2–0)	Belgium

Poland	9 – 0	Austria

Austria	10 – 3 (6–1, 2–0, 2–2)	Belgium

France	10 – 5 (1–2, 5–1, 4–2)	Poland

==== Group B ====
Team	Pld	W	L	D	GF	GA	GD	Pts
Switzerland	3	3	0	0	27	7	+20	6
Denmark	3	2	1	0	8	8	0	4
Netherlands	3	1	2	0	11	17	−6	2
Italy	3	0	3	0	5	19	−14	0

Switzerland	10 – 4 (3–1, 4–1, 3–2)	Netherlands

Italy	0 – 3	Denmark

Switzerland	8 – 2 (4–1, 1–0, 3–1)	Denmark

Netherlands	7 – 4	Italy

Denmark	3 – 0 (1–0, 1–0, 1–0)	Netherlands

Switzerland	9 – 1 (2–0, 5–1, 2–0)	Italy

=== Final round ===
==== 7th place game ====
Italy	17 – 2	Belgium

==== 5th place game ====
Austria	6 – 5	Netherlands

==== 3rd place game ====
Poland	6 – 5 OT	Denmark

==== 1st place game ====
France	4 – 5 OT (0–2, 2–0, 2–2, 0–1)	Switzerland

Switzerland was promoted to Pool A for the 1980 World Junior Ice Hockey Championships.
