= Su He =

Chinese speed skater

Personal information
- Full name: 苏和
- Nationality: Chinese
- Born: 4 July 1957 (age 67)

Sport
- Sport: Speed skating

Su He (born 4 July 1957) is a Chinese speed skater. He competed in the men's 500 metres event at the 1980 Winter Olympics.
