= Anneli Repola =

Finnish speed skater

Personal information
- Full name: Marja Anneli Risku-Repola
- Nationality: Finnish
- Born: 5 March 1954 (age 71); Seinäjoki, Finland

Sport
- Sport: Speed skating

Marja Anneli Risku-Repola (born 5 March 1954) is a Finnish speed skater. She competed in four events at the 1980 Winter Olympics.

Her daughter, Elina Risku, is also a speed skater.
