= Markku Hakulinen =

Finnish ice hockey player

- Born: 27 February 1956 Joensuu, Finland
- Died: 9 October 1990 (aged 34) Turku, Finland
- Height: 6 ft 2 in (188 cm)
- Weight: 194 lb (88 kg; 13 st 12 lb)
- Position: Right wing
- Shot: Right
- Played for: JoKP; KOOVEE; Kiekkoreipas; HPK; TuTo
- National team: Finland
- Playing career: 1975–1986

Markku Pauli Hakulinen (27 February 1956 – 9 October 1990) was a Finnish ice hockey player. He competed in the men's tournament at the 1980 Winter Olympics. Hakulinen died after jumping in front of a train in 1990.
