= Seppo Suoraniemi =

Finnish ice hockey player

Seppo Suoraniemi (born August 26, 1951 in Oulu, Finland) is a retired professional ice hockey player who played in the SM-liiga. He played for HJK, Jokerit, Ilves, and TPS. He was inducted into the Finnish Hockey Hall of Fame in 1992.
