= Ismo Villa =

Finnish ice hockey player

Personal information
- Nationality: Finnish
- Born: 8 November 1954; Rauma, Finland
- Died: 18 November 2014 (aged 60)

Sport
- Sport: Ice hockey

Ismo Villa (8 November 1954 – 18 November 2014) was a Finnish ice hockey player. He competed in the men's tournament at the 1980 Winter Olympics.
