= Pertti Niittylä =

Finnish speed skater

Pertti Ilmari Niittylä (born January 16, 1956) is a former ice speed skater from Finland, who was the nation's leading rider in the 1970s and 1980s. He represented his native country in four consecutive Winter Olympics, starting in 1976 in Innsbruck, Austria.
