= Reijo Leppänen =

Finnish ice hockey player (born 1951)

Reijo Kalevi Leppänen (born 8 November 1951 in Turku) is a Finnish retired professional ice hockey player who played in the SM-liiga. He played for TPS. He was inducted into the Finnish Hockey Hall of Fame in 1992.
