= Esa Puolakka =

Finnish speed skater

Personal information
- Nationality: Finnish
- Born: 7 December 1958 (age 66); Pieksämäki, Finland

Sport
- Sport: Speed skating

Esa Puolakka (born 7 December 1958) is a Finnish speed skater. He competed in two events at the 1980 Winter Olympics.
