= Esa Peltonen =

Finnish ice hockey player

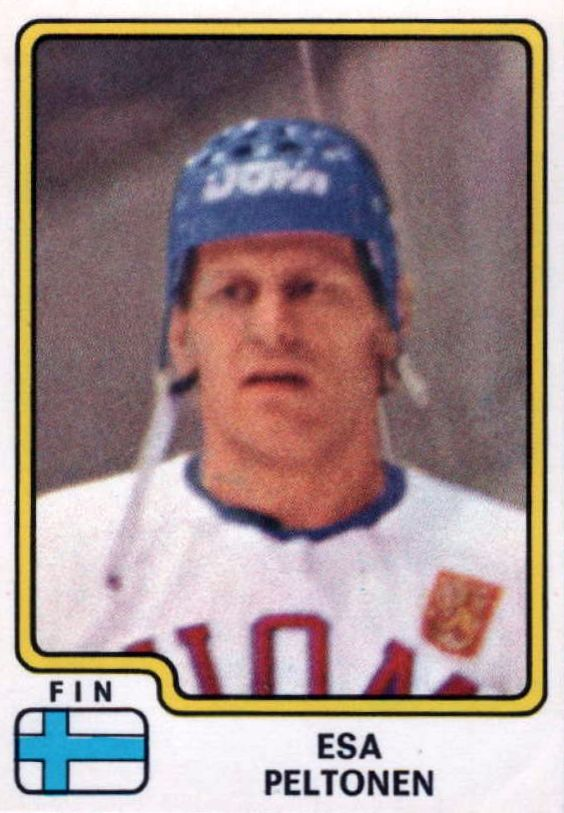
- Born: 25 February 1947 (age 78) Oulu, Finland
- Height: 5 ft 10 in (178 cm)
- Weight: 172 lb (78 kg; 12 st 4 lb)
- Position: Left wing
- Shot: Left
- Played for: SM-liiga; Kärpät; Upon Pallo; HJK; HIFK; Kiekkoreipas
- National team: Finland
- Playing career: 1970–1984

Esa Olavi Peltonen (born 25 February 1947) is a Finnish former professional ice hockey player who played in the SM-liiga for Kärpät, Upon Pallo, HJK, HIFK and Kiekkoreipas. He was inducted into the Finnish Hockey Hall of Fame in 1990.

Esa Peltonen, a member of IIHF Hall of Fame, played as many as 277 games (93G/49A - 142pts.) for the Finnish national team. His 93 goals are the second best in Finnish ice hockey history (Lasse Oksanen 101). Esa Peltonen represented the Finnish national team in four Olympic tournaments (1968, 1972, 1976 and 1980). He played in 11 World Championships (1967–78). He was also on the Finnish team at the inaugural Canada Cup in 1976.

Peltonen was inducted into the IIHF Hall of Fame in 2007.

His son, Ville Peltonen, also played for the Finnish national team.
