= Markku Kiimalainen =

Finnish ice hockey player

Personal information
- Nationality: Finnish
- Born: 8 October 1955 (age 69); Oulu, Finland

Sport
- Sport: Ice hockey

Markku Kiimalainen (born 8 October 1955) is a Finnish ice hockey player. He competed in the men's tournament at the 1980 Winter Olympics.
