= Jukka Salmela =

Finnish speed skater

Personal information
- Full name: Jukka Arto Olavi Salmela
- Born: December 30, 1958 (age 67)

Sport
- Country: Finland
- Sport: Speed skating

Achievements and titles
- Personal best: 36.80 (500m)

Jukka Arto Olavi Salmela (born 30 December 1958) is a Finnish former speedskater who specialised in the 500-m and 1000-m. He took part in the 1980 Winter Olympics on these distances, with an 18th rank on the 500-m as his best result, and was ranked 12th in the 1981 World Sprint Speed Skating Championships. On 31 March 1980, Salmela was the first skater in the world to race the 500-m below 37 seconds, when he achieved the time of 36.8 on the Medeo skating rink in Alma Ata. At that time, the world record was Yevgeny Kulikov's 37.00 of March 1975. Salmela's result was however not officially ratified as a world record by the International Skating Union; also, 36.8 was clocked by manual and not electronic timing. His 36.8 was the world's best 500-m result until Aleksandr Danilin and Pavel Pegov skated respectively 36.76 and 36.68 at the Medeo rink on 25 March 1983; the next day, Pegov improved the world record to 36.57.
