= Jukka Porvari =

Finnish ice hockey player

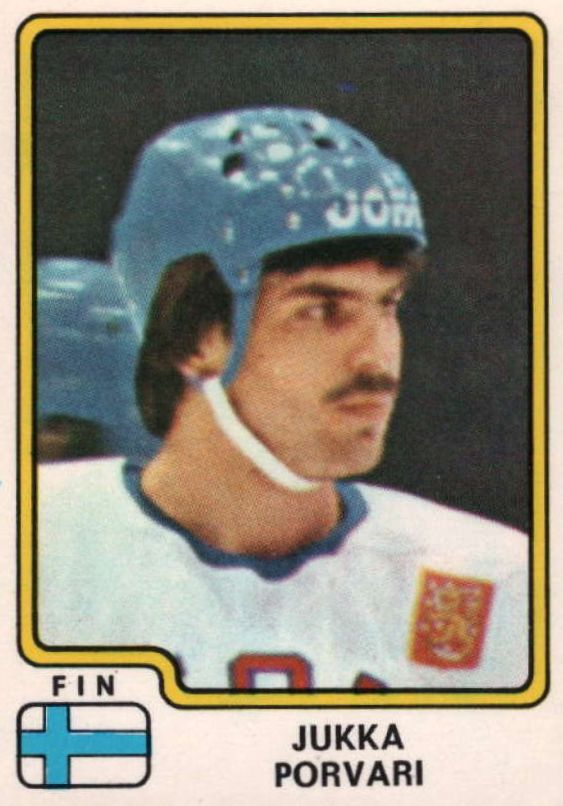
- Born: January 19, 1954 (age 71); Tampere, Finland
- Height: 5 ft 11 in (180 cm)
- Weight: 175 lb (79 kg; 12 st 7 lb)
- Position: Forward
- Shot: Left
- Played for: Tappara; Colorado Rockies; New Jersey Devils; TPS
- National team: Finland
- NHL draft: Undrafted
- Playing career: 1974–1991

Jukka Veikko Porvari (born January 19, 1954, in Tampere, Finland) is a Finnish retired professional ice hockey player who played in the SM-liiga and National Hockey League (NHL). He played for Tappara, TPS, New Jersey Devils, and Colorado Rockies. He was inducted into the Finnish Hockey Hall of Fame in 1994. He also played at the 1980 Winter Olympics, with 7 goals and 4 assists for a total of 11 points in 7 games.

== Career statistics ==
=== Regular season and playoffs ===
			Regular season					Playoffs
Season	Team	League	GP	G	A	Pts	PIM	GP	G	A	Pts	PIM
1972–73	Hämeenlinnan Tarmo	FIN-2	14	9	4	13	4	—	—	—	—	—
1973–74	Hämeenlinnan Tarmo	FIN-3	9	17	15	32	4	—	—	—	—	—
1974–75	Tappara	FIN	36	7	9	16	2	—	—	—	—	—
1975–76	Tappara	FIN	36	10	10	20	4	4	0	2	2	4
1976–77	Tappara	FIN	36	17	16	33	20	6	3	5	8	5
1977–78	Tappara	FIN	26	11	7	18	18	8	1	1	2	16
1978–79	Tappara	FIN	35	20	22	42	38	10	9	4	13	0
1979–80	Tappara	FIN	31	19	15	34	36	—	—	—	—	—
1980–81	Tappara	FIN	36	14	18	32	22	8	4	6	10	6
1981–82	Colorado Rockies	NHL	31	2	6	8	0	—	—	—	—	—
1981–82	Fort Worth Texans	CHL	2	0	0	0	0	—	—	—	—	—
1982–83	New Jersey Devils	NHL	8	1	3	4	4	—	—	—	—	—
1982–83	Wichita Wind	CHL	11	2	3	5	0	—	—	—	—	—
1982–83	Klagenfurter AC	AUT	14	13	10	23	18	—	—	—	—	—
1983–84	TPS	FIN	37	18	8	26	16	10	5	1	6	4
1984–85	TPS	FIN	36	27	16	43	26	10	7	2	9	12
1985–86	TPS	FIN	36	9	8	17	10	7	0	3	3	0
1986–87	TuTo	FIN-2	29	14	22	36	18	—	—	—	—	—
1987–88	TuTo	FIN-2	40	11	18	29	18	—	—	—	—	—
1988–89	Kiekko-67 Turku	FIN-3	30	26	41	67	26	—	—	—	—	—
1989–90	Kiekko-67 Turku	FIN-2	29	16	18	34	22	—	—	—	—	—
1990–91	Kiekko-67 Turku	FIN-2	3	0	0	0	4	—	—	—	—	—
FIN totals			345	152	129	281	192	63	29	24	53	47
NHL totals			39	3	9	12	4	—	—	—	—	—

=== International ===
Year	Team	Event	GP	G	A	Pts	PIM
1973	Finland	EJC	5	1	0	1	0
1974	Finland	WJC	5	1	1	2	0
1977	Finland	WC	10	3	4	7	2
1978	Finland	WC	10	2	1	3	8
1979	Finland	WC	8	4	1	5	8
1980	Finland	OLY	7	7	4	11	4
1981	Finland	WC	8	3	0	3	8
1981	Finland	CC	5	1	1	2	0
Junior totals			10	2	1	3	0
Senior totals			48	20	11	31	30
