= Lasse Litma =

Finnish ice hockey player

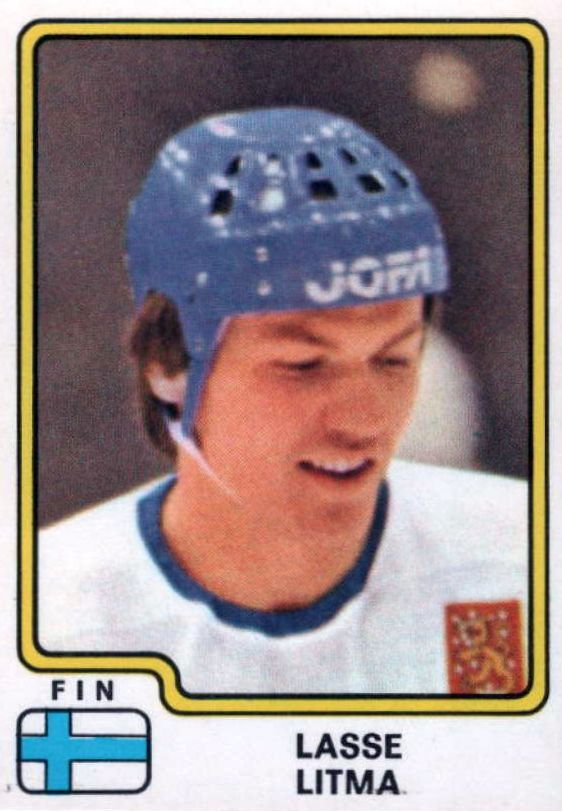

Personal information
- Nationality: Finnish

Sport
- Sport: Ice hockey

Lasse Antero Litma (born 5 April 1954 in Jyväskylä, Finland) is a retired professional ice hockey player who played in the SM-liiga. He played for Tappara. He was inducted into the Finnish Hockey Hall of Fame in 1994.
