= Olli Saarinen =

Finnish ice hockey player (born 1953)

Personal information
- Nationality: Finnish
- Born: 29 July 1953; Mänttä, Finland
- Died: July 2025 (aged 72)

Sport
- Sport: Ice hockey

Olli Saarinen (29 July 1953 – July 2025) was a Finnish ice hockey player. He competed in the men's tournament at the 1980 Winter Olympics.
