= Hannu Koskinen =

Finnish ice hockey player

Personal information
- Nationality: Finnish
- Born: 23 November 1953 (age 71); Lahti, Finland

Sport
- Sport: Ice hockey

Hannu Koskinen (born 23 November 1953) is a Finnish ice hockey player. He competed in the men's tournament at the 1980 Winter Olympics.
