= Jarmo Mäkitalo =

Finnish ice hockey player

Personal information
- Nationality: Finnish
- Born: 8 October 1960 (age 64); Lahti, Finland

Sport
- Sport: Ice hockey

Jarmo Mäkitalo (born 8 October 1960) is a Finnish ice hockey player. He competed in the men's tournaments at the 1980 Winter Olympics and the 1984 Winter Olympics. Mäkitalo settled in Sweden after his playing career.

== Career statistics ==
=== Regular season and playoffs ===
			Regular season					Playoffs
Season	Team	League	GP	G	A	Pts	PIM	GP	G	A	Pts	PIM
1975–76	Kiekkoreipas	FIN U20
1976–77	Kiekkoreipas	FIN U20
1977–78	Kiekkoreipas	SM-l	29	5	4	9	6	—	—	—	—	—
1978–79	Kiekkoreipas	SM-l	36	10	10	20	10	—	—	—	—	—
1979–80	Kiekkoreipas	SM-l	35	15	12	27	4	—	—	—	—	—
1980–81	Leksands IF	SEL	35	12	15	27	8	—	—	—	—	—
1981–82	Leksands IF	SEL	36	15	18	33	18	—	—	—	—	—
1982–83	Leksands IF	SEL	27	11	3	14	8	—	—	—	—	—
1983–84	Södertälje SK	SEL	28	21	16	37	12	3	1	1	2	2
1984–85	Södertälje SK	SEL	29	20	16	36	8	8	2	2	4	0
1985–86	Leksands IF	SEL	30	8	12	20	6	—	—	—	—	—
1986–87	Leksands IF	SEL	32	8	17	25	12	—	—	—	—	—
1987–88	Leksands IF	SEL	39	7	27	34	14	3	1	3	4	0
1988–89	Leksands IF	SEL	34	9	17	26	16	10	4	4	8	0
1989–90	Leksands IF	SEL	38	17	22	39	20	2	2	0	2	0
1990–91	Boro HC	SWE.2	13	16	10	26	8	—	—	—	—	—
1990–91	Boro HC	Allsv	18	8	16	24	6	—	—	—	—	—
1991–92	Boro HC	SWE.2	31	28	29	57	2	—	—	—	—	—
1992–93	Leksands IF	SEL	34	10	15	25	14	2	0	1	1	0
1993–94	Leksands IF	SEL	36	12	16	28	8	4	0	0	0	2
1994–95	Leksands IF	SEL	35	5	10	15	12	4	0	0	0	0
1995–96	IK Oskarshamn	SWE.3	36	28	43	71	26	—	—	—	—	—
1996–97	IK Oskarshamn	SWE.2	32	17	29	46	6	—	—	—	—	—
1997–98	Kärpät	FIN.2	29	22	14	36	4	—	—	—	—	—
1997–98	Falu IF	SWE.2	2	1	1	2	0	—	—	—	—	—
1997–98	Heilbronner EC	GER.2	3	0	0	0	0	—	—	—	—	—
1998–99	Herning IK	DEN	42	22	48	70	12	—	—	—	—	—
1999–2000	Kristianstads IK	SWE.3
1999–2000	Hedemora SK	SWE.3
SM-l totals			100	30	26	56	20	—	—	—	—	—
SEL totals			433	155	204	359	156	36	10	11	21	4

=== International ===
Year	Team	Event	GP	G	A	Pts	PIM
1978	Finland	EJC	5	4	7	11	0
1979	Finland	WJC	6	4	3	7	2
1980	Finland	WJC	5	2	1	3	2
1980	Finland	OG	7	0	0	0	0
1984	Finland	OG	6	3	2	5	7
Junior totals			16	10	11	21	4
Senior totals			13	3	2	5	7

"Jarmo Mäkitalo". Elite Prospects.
