= Hannu Haapalainen =

Finnish ice hockey player

- Born: February 28, 1951; Nokia, Finland
- Died: November 5, 2011 (aged 60)
- Position: Defence
- Shot: Right
- Played for: KOOVEE; Tappara; Kölner EC; Düsseldorfer EG
- National team: Finland
- Playing career: 1969–1986

Hannu Wilhelm Haapalainen (February 28, 1951 – November 5, 2011) was a Finnish professional ice hockey player who played in the SM-liiga. He played for Tappara and KooVee and won five league championships. He was inducted into the Finnish Hockey Hall of Fame in 1992.
