= Romania national bobsleigh team =

International bobsledding team

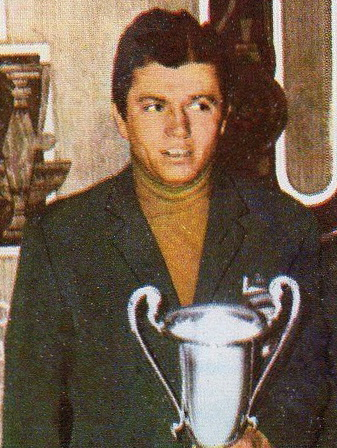
Bobsledder Ion Panțuru, who won with Nicolae Neagoe the only medal in Winter Olympics for Romania (Grenoble 1968)

The Romanian national bobsleigh team represents Romania in international bobsledding competitions.

The team made its debut with the five-man bobsleigh at the 1928 Winter Olympics in St. Moritz.

At the 1968 Winter Olympics in Grenoble the Romanian selection won a historic bronze medal with the two-man bobsleigh team led by Ion Panțuru and Nicolae Neagoe, which is the only medal won by Romania at the Winter Olympics. At the same Olympics, Romania was also close to a bronze medal in the four-man competition, placing fourth.

== History ==
=== Origins ===
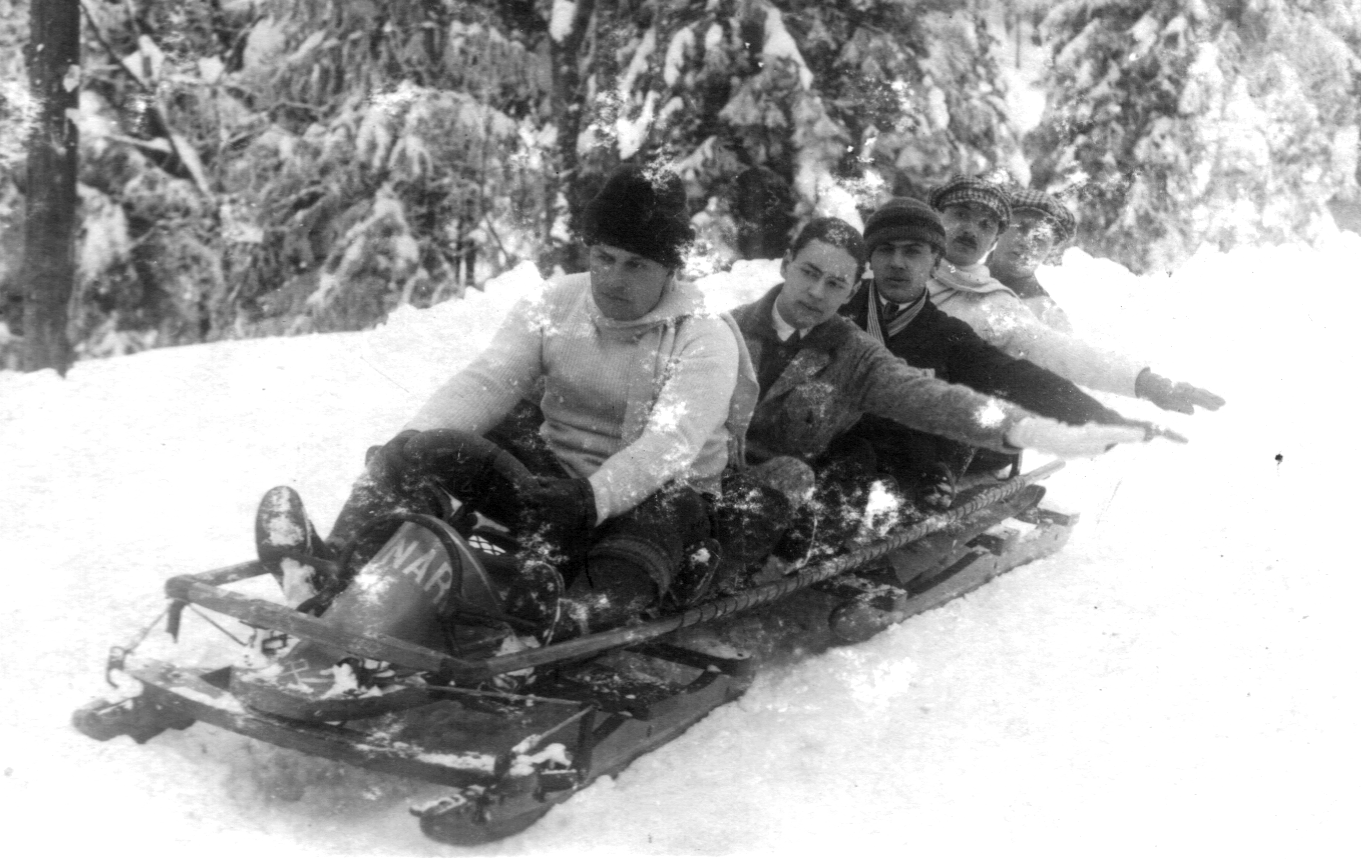
5-men bobsleigh in Sinaia (1914).

The practice of bobsleigh in Romania dates back to around 1909, when sporting activity was limited to a few days a year, around the winter holidays; from 1910 "winter sports competitions" were organised, with modest participation. Until 1916, bobsleigh races were regularly held in Sinaia, along with sledging and skeleton races, but without precise rules. The first winner of a bobsleigh race in 1910 was N. Filiti, and the first winner of a multi-team race was a generic "Romanian Sports Club" (Cercul Sportiv Român). In 1911, the presence of women in bobsleighing was very active: competitions were organised in three events (two-woman bobsleigh, two-man bobsleigh and team competition of 2-5-6 persons), whose winners included Natalia Darvari (women), Jean Costinescu (men) and the mixed crew of the "Societatea Săniutza". In 1912, the competition programme was the same: in the women's category Mihaela Ghyka won, and in the men's category a (male) crew led by Mihaela Ghyka herself won.

In 1912, the Federation of Romanian Sports Societies (Federației Societăților de Sport din România - FSSR) was founded, within which a Winter Sports Commission was established, with the task of coordinating and promoting the practice of bobsleigh. In 1914, for the first time, a national inter-school bobsleigh competition was organised, which was won by the "Gh. Lazăr" High School in Bucharest. Also in 1914, a team of German tourists participated in the "National bobsleigh competition", coming third, while the competition was won by the team from the Evangelical School of Bucharest.

After World War I, bobbing activity was resumed from 1920, in localities such as Brașov, Râmnicu Vâlcea, Slatina, and Iași. Bobsledding was generally practised along mountain roads and on the ski slopes of Postăvaru and Poiana Brașov. In 1922, the first national winter sports championships were held: the bobsled championship was held in Sinaia, with the title in the "club teams" event going to the Râmnicu Vâlcea Centre, whose driver was Iorgu Arsenie. The rise of the bobsleigh began in 1923, when several competitions with prizes were held: the title of national champion went to the team of the Club "Colțea" from Bucharest. In 1924, the crew of the "Societatea Politehnica București" won.

=== International activity ===
The organisation of the 1924 Winter Olympics in Chamonix (France) aroused the interest of Romanian bobbists, but the lack of state funds to support participation in the Olympics was widely discussed in the press at the time. Iorgu Arsenie built a bobsleigh christened Avalanșa (avalanche) and together with Tita Rădulescu reached Chamonix, where they participated in the races with a borrowed bobsleigh (Bachmann type) and won three cups; however, they were unable to participate in the Olympic competition because the rules required the entire crew to be from the same country, a condition they were unable to meet. Iorgu Arsenie, as a representative of the Commission for the Constitution of the Fédération Internationale de Bobsleigh et de Tobogganing (FIBT) in Chamonix in 1924, obtained Romania's affiliation to this international sporting body.

In 1925, the first bobsled track was built in Sinaia according to the design of engineer Sângiorzan, on a western slope of the Furnica hill, with a length of 2,100 m and ten curves. The first bobsleighs were made of wood with an iron bottom, were guided by ropes or a steering wheel and had 2, 4, 5 or 6 seats. At the national bobsleigh championship in 1927 in Sinaia, the student crew of brothers Grigore and Mircea Socolescu and major Mihai Mihail from Slatina distinguished themselves; on this occasion, a cup for "the most daring and skilful bobsleigh" was awarded to 21-year-old Alexandru Papană, who would dominate the bobsleigh races in the following years. The recognition of his skill was confirmed in 1928, when, together with Dumitru Hubert, they won the title of national champions in the two-man race. The "Aeronautica" club (to which the two competitors belonged) had two crews: Alexandru Papană (driver), Alexandru Ionescu, Tiberiu Stătescu, Puffi Popescu, Gheorghe Moțoi (brakeman). From these, the bobsledders who would bring fame to Romanian sport would be selected later.

Performances in 1926-1928 stimulated interest and led to the presence of the Romanian five-man bobsleigh at the 1928 Winter Olympics in St. Moritz, although the expenses were borne by the athletes from their own savings. The Romanian crew finished in a commendable 7th place, 4.3 seconds behind the champions.

The first famous Romanian bobber was Alexandru Papană, national bobsleigh champion in 1928 and 1931 and winner of the FIBT World Championships 1933 in Schreiberhau, Germany (now Szklarska Poręba, Poland), along with Dumitru Hubert. The Romanian crew used ropes instead of a steering wheel and made a "flying start" (one of the first at the time), for which they had patented a special push handle on the bobsleigh.

The FIBT World Championships 1934 saw the domination of Romania, who won the gold medal in the four-man bobsleigh and gold and bronze medals in the two-man bobsleigh. In November 1934, the Romanian Bobsleigh Federation was formed, however, despite the organisational development, the series of successes was interrupted: the participation in the FIBT World Championships 1935 in St. Moritz (Switzerland), with a 2-man bobsleigh crew, piloted by Papană and two 4-person bobsleigh crews, piloted by Papană and Frim, ended in failure.

In 1951, a 1,640-1,530 m long bobsleigh track was built in Poiana Brașov for the organisation of the World University Games.

=== The first Olympic medal ===
From 1966, Romanian bobsleigh made a comeback on the international scene, thanks to Ion Panțuru. At the FIBT World Championships 1966, Ion Panțuru and Nicolae Neagoe came 5th in the two-man bobsleigh race, and at the European Championships in Garmisch-Partenkirchen the same team came 6th. In 1967, at the European Championships in Igls (Austria), the four-man bobsleigh team (Ion Panțuru, Gheorghe Maftei, Petre Hristovici, and Nicolae Neagoe) won the gold medal and the title of European champion. In the two-man bobsleigh, the Panțuru-Neagoe pair came second.

At the 1968 Winter Olympics in Grenoble, the Romanian selection won a historic bronze medal with the two-man bobsleigh led by Ion Panțuru and Nicolae Neagoe, which is the only Olympic medal won in the history of Romania at the Winter Olympics so far. In the same edition, the Romanian four-man bobsleigh finished fourth, touching the bronze medal by just one hundredth of a second. In the 1969 European bobsleigh championships, the Romanian four-man bobsleigh team finished fourth.

At the 1969 European Bobsleigh Championships held on the Blue Lake bobsleigh track in Cervinia the crew Panțuru-Focșeneanu won the silver medal as well as in the four-man bobsleigh with Ion Panţuru, Raimond Țancov, Dumitru Focșeneanu and Nicolae Neagoe. The crew of Ion Panțuru and Dumitru Focșeneanu won silver and bronze medals at the FIBT World Championships 1969 and the FIBT World Championships 1973, both held in Lake Placid.

After 1970, a modern concrete track was built in Sinaia, which entered the circuit of international competitions, organizing the annual "Carpathian Trophy" (Trofeul Carpați).

At the 1970 European Championships in Cortina, the Romanian four-man bobsled won the bronze medal, while in Igls 1971 they won the title of European champions.

Romania was designated as the host venue for the 1977 European Bobsleigh Championships, however warm weather melted the snow on the course, preventing the competition from taking place.

At the IBSF World Championships 2017 in Schönau am Königssee, bobsledders Maria Adela Constantin and Andreea Grecu rode the two-woman bobsleigh in the team competition, winning the bronze medal with the international team also consisting of three other German athletes.

== Olympic record ==
=== Two-man ===
Olympics	City	Ranking	Bobsledders
1932	Lake Placid	4	Alexandru Papană, Dumitru Hubert
1936	Garmisch-Partenkirchen	15; 16	Alexandru Frim, Tita Rădulescu; Alexandru Budişteanu, Dumitru Gheorghiu
1956	Cortina d'Ampezzo	14; 18	Heinrich Enea, Mărgărit Blăgescu; Constantin Dragomir, Gheorghe Moldoveanu
1964	Innsbruck	13; 15	Ion Panțuru, Hariton Pașovschi; Alexandru Oancea, Constantin Cotacu
1968	Grenoble	3 DQ	Ion Panțuru, Nicolae Neagoe; Romeo Nedelcu, Gheorghe Maftei
1972	Sapporo	5; 12	Ion Panțuru, Ion Zangor; Dragoș Panaitescu-Rapan, Dumitru Focșeneanu
1976	Innsbruck	11; 12	Ion Panțuru, Gheorghe Lixandru; Dragoș Panaitescu-Rapan, Costel Ionescu
1980	Lake Placid	11; 18	Dragoș Panaitescu-Rapan, Gheorghe Lixandru; Constantin Iancu, Constantin Obreja
1984	Sarajevo	18; 23	Ion Duminicel, Costel Petrariu; Dorin Degan, Cornel Popescu
1988	Calgary	24; 27	Csaba Nagy Lakatos, Costel Petrariu; Dorin Degan, Grigore Anghel
1992	Albertville	18; 22	Csaba Nagy Lakatos, Laurenţiu Budur; Paul Neagu, Costel Petrariu
1994	Lillehammer	30	Florian Enache, Mihai Dumitrașcu
1998	Nagano	25; 26	Paul Neagu, Gabriel Tătaru; Florian Enache, Mihai Dumitrașcu
2002	Salt Lake City	25	Adrian Duminicel, Florian Enache
2006	Turin	24; 26	Nicolae Istrate, Adrian Duminicel; Mihai Iliescu, Levente Andrei Bartha
2010	Vancouver	11	Nicolae Istrate, Florin Cezar Crăciun
2014	Sochi	17	Nicolae Istrate, Florin Cezar Crăciun
2018	Pyeongchang	18	Mihai Cristian Tentea, Nicolae Ciprian Daroczi
2022	Beijing	16	Mihai Cristian Tentea, Nicolae Ciprian Daroczi
2026	Milan-Cortina	5	Mihai Cristian Tentea, George Iordache

=== Four-man ===
Olympics	City	Ranking	Bobsledders
1928	St. Moritz	7; 19	Grigore Socolescu, Mircea Socolescu, Ion Gavăţ, Toma Petre Ghițulescu, Traian Niţescu; Alexandru Berlescu, Petre Petrovici, Horia Roman, Eugen Ştefănescu, Tita Rădulescu
1932	Lake Placid	6	Alexandru Papană, Alexandru Ionescu, Ulise Petrescu, Dumitru Hubert
1936	Garmisch-Partenkirchen	DNF; DNS	Alexandru Budişteanu, Tita Rădulescu, Alexandru Ionescu, Aurel Mărăşescu; Emil Angelescu, Dumitru Gheorghiu, Teodor Popescu, Alexandru Tautu
1956	Cortina d'Ampezzo	14; 20	Heinrich Enea, Dumitru Peteu, Nicolae Moiceanu, Mărgărit Blăgescu; Constantin Dragomir, Vasile Panait, Ion Staicu, Gheorghe Moldoveanu
1964	Innsbruck	15	Ion Panțuru, Gheorghe Maftei, Constantin Cotacu, Hariton Pașovschi
1968	Grenoble	4	Ion Panțuru, Petre Hristovici, Gheorghe Maftei, Nicolae Neagoe
1972	Sapporo	10	Ion Panțuru, Ion Zangor, Grigore Anghel, Dumitru Focșeneanu
1976	Innsbruck	8; 14	Dragoș Panaitescu-Rapan, Paul Neagu, Costel Ionescu, Gheorghe Lixandru Ion Panţuru, Constantin Romaniuc, Alexe Gheorghe Tănăsescu, Mihai Nicolau
1980	Lake Placid	8; 14	Dragoș Panaitescu-Rapan, Paul Neagu, Costel Ionescu, Gheorghe Lixandru; Ion Panțuru, Constantin Romaniuc, Alexe Gheorghe Tănăsescu, Mihai Nicolau
1984	Sarajevo	7	Dorin Degan, Cornel Popescu, Gheorghe Lixandru, Costel Petrariu
1988	Calgary	20	Csaba Nagy Lakatos, Grigore Anghel, Florian Olteanu, Costel Petrariu
1992	Albertville	20	Paul Neagu, Laszlo Hodos, Laurenţiu Budur, Costel Petrariu
1994	Lillehammer	23	Florian Enache, Marian Chițescu, Iulian Păcioianu, Mihai Dumitrașcu
1998	Nagano	27	Florian Enache, Marian Chițescu, Iulian Păcioianu, Mihai Dumitrașcu
2002	Salt Lake City	21	Florian Enache, Adrian Duminicel, Iulian Păcioianu, Teodor Demetriad
2006	Turin	22	Nicolae Istrate, Adrian Duminicel, Gabriel Popa, Ioan Dănuț Dovalciuc
2010	Vancouver	15	Nicolae Istrate, Ioan Dănuț Dovalciuc, Ionuţ Andrei, Florin Crăciun
2014	Sochi	24	Andreas Neagu, Bogdan Laurentiu Otavă, Dănuț Moldovan, Paul Muntean, Florin Cezar Crăciun
2018	Pyeongchang	29	Dorin Alexandru Grigore, Florin Cezar Crăciun, Levente Bartha, Paul Septimiu Muntean
2022	Beijing	13	Mihai Tentea, Raul Dobre, Ciprian Daroczi, Cristian Radu
2026	Molan-Cortina	17	Mihai Tentea, +4

=== Two-woman ===
Olympics	City	Ranking	Bobsledders
2002	Salt Lake City	15	Erika Kovacs, Maria Spirescu
2010	Vancouver	15	Carmen Radenovic, Alina Vera Savin
2014	Sochi	17	Maria Constantin, Andreea Grecu
2018	Pyeongchang	15	Maria Constantin, Andreea Grecu
2022	Beijing	18	Andreea Grecu, Katharina Wick

=== Women's monobob ===
Olympics	City	Ranking	Bobsledders
2022	Beijing	12	Andreea Grecu

== See also ==
- Romania at the Olympics
- Sport in Romania
