= List of flag bearers for Romania at the Olympics =

Romania at the Olympics
- IOC code: ROU
- NOC: Romanian Olympic and Sports Committee
- Website: www.cosr.ro (in Romanian, English, and French)
- Medals: Gold 93 Silver 101 Bronze 124 Total 318

Summer appearances
- 1900; 1904–1920; 1924; 1928; 1932; 1936; 1948; 1952; 1956; 1960; 1964; 1968; 1972; 1976; 1980; 1984; 1988; 1992; 1996; 2000; 2004; 2008; 2012; 2016; 2020; 2024

Winter appearances
- 1928; 1932; 1936; 1948; 1952; 1956; 1960; 1964; 1968; 1972; 1976; 1980; 1984; 1988; 1992; 1994; 1998; 2002; 2006; 2010; 2014; 2018; 2022; 2026

This is a list of flag bearers who have represented Romania at the Olympics.

Flag bearers carry the national flag of their country at the opening ceremony of the Olympic Games.

#	Event year	Season	Flag bearer	Sport
1	1936	Summer	Șerban Mănciulescu	Shooting (did not compete)
2	1952	Summer	Dumitru Paraschivescu (Note: possibly Constantin Dumitru)	Athletics
3	1956	Summer	Iosif Sîrbu	Shooting
4	1960	Summer	Alexandru Bizim	Athletics
5	1964	Winter	Ion Panțuru	Bobsleigh
6	1964	Summer	Aurel Vernescu	Canoe sprint
7	1968	Winter	Beatrice Huștiu	Figure skating
8	1968	Summer	Aurel Vernescu	Canoe sprint
9	1972	Winter	Ion Panțuru	Bobsleigh
10	1972	Summer	Aurel Vernescu	Canoe sprint
11	1976	Winter	Gheorghe Gârniţă	Biathlon
12	1976	Summer	Nicolae Martinescu	Greco-Roman wrestling
13	1980	Winter	Gheorghe Lixandru	Bobsleigh
14	1980	Summer	Vasile Andrei	Wrestling
15	1984	Winter	Dorel Cristudor	Bobsleigh
16	1984	Summer	Corneliu Ion	Shooting
17	1988	Winter	Dorin Degan	Bobsleigh
18	1988	Summer	Vasile Andrei	Wrestling
19	1992	Winter	Ioan Apostol	Luge
20	1992	Summer	Costel Grasu	Athletics
21	1994	Winter	Ioan Apostol	Luge
22	1996	Summer	Iulică Ruican	Rowing
23	1998	Winter	Mihaela Dascălu	Speed skating
24	2000	Summer	Elisabeta Lipă	Rowing
25	2002	Winter	Éva Tófalvi	Biathlon
26	2004	Summer	Elisabeta Lipă	Rowing
27	2006	Winter	Gheorghe Chiper	Figure skating
28	2008	Summer	Valeria Motogna-Beșe	Handball
29	2010	Winter	Éva Tófalvi	Biathlon
30	2012	Summer	Horia Tecău	Tennis
31	2014	Winter	Éva Tófalvi	Biathlon
32	2016	Summer	Cătălina Ponor	Artistic gymnastics
33	2018	Winter	Marius Ungureanu	Biathlon
34	2020	Summer	Robert Glință	Swimming
34	2020	Summer	Simona Radiș	Rowing
35	2022	Winter	Paul Pepene	Cross-country skiing
35	2022	Winter	Raluca Stramaturaru	Luge
36	2024	Summer	Ionela Cozmiuc	Rowing
36	2024	Summer	Marius Cozmiuc	Rowing
37	2026	Winter	Julia Sauter	Figure skating
37	2026	Winter	Daniela Toth	Ski jumping

== See also ==
- Romania at the Olympics
