= Romania at the 1976 Winter Olympics =

- IOC code: ROU (ROM used at these Games)
- NOC: Romanian Olympic and Sports Committee
- Website: www.cosr.ro (in Romanian, English, and French)

in Innsbruck
- Competitors: 32 (men) in 4 sports
- Flag bearer: Gheorghe Gârniță
- Medals: Gold 0 Silver 0 Bronze 0 Total 0

Winter Olympics appearances (overview)
- 1928; 1932; 1936; 1948; 1952; 1956; 1960; 1964; 1968; 1972; 1976; 1980; 1984; 1988; 1992; 1994; 1998; 2002; 2006; 2010; 2014; 2018; 2022; 2026

Romania competed at the 1976 Winter Olympics in Innsbruck, Austria.

== Alpine skiing ==
Men

Athlete	Event	Race 1		Race 2		Total	
Athlete	Event	Time	Rank	Time	Rank	Time	Rank
Ion Cavaşi	Downhill					2:00.19	57
Dan Cristea	Downhill					1:55.63	49
Dan Cristea	Giant Slalom	2:01.78	65	2:03.51	45	4:05.29	45
Ion Cavaşi	Giant Slalom	1:59.90	60	DNF	–	DNF	–
Dan Cristea	Slalom	1:10.70	39	1:16.87	35	2:27.57	34
Ion Cavaşi	Slalom	1:08.59	36	1:12.73	30	2:21.32	30

== Biathlon ==
Men

Event	Athlete	Time	Penalties	Adjusted time ^{1}	Rank
20 km	Nicolae Cristoloveanu	1'20:15.53	8	1'28:15.53	45
20 km	Gheorghe Gârniţă	1'17:00.71	8	1'25:00.71	31
20 km	Gheorghe Voicu	1'16:01.52	5	1'21:01.52	16

^{1} One minute added per close miss (a hit in the outer ring), two minutes added per complete miss.

Men's 4 x 7.5 km relay

Athletes	Race		
Athletes	Misses ^{2}	Time	Rank
Nicolae Cristoloveanu; Gheorghe Voicu; Victor Fontana; Gheorghe Gârniţă	7	2'09:54.40	10

^{2} A penalty loop of 200 metres had to be skied per missed target.

== Bobsleigh ==
Sled	Athletes	Event	Run 1		Run 2		Run 3		Run 4		Total	
Sled	Athletes	Event	Time	Rank	Time	Rank	Time	Rank	Time	Rank	Time	Rank
ROU-1	Ion Panţuru; Gheorghe Lixandru	Two-man	57.15	11	57.43	11	57.85	16	57.66	12	3:50.09	11
ROU-2	Dragoș Panaitescu-Rapan; Costel Ionescu	Two-man	57.95	18	57.66	15	57.58	11	57.34	10	3:50.53	12

Sled	Athletes	Event	Run 1		Run 2		Run 3		Run 4		Total	
Sled	Athletes	Event	Time	Rank	Time	Rank	Time	Rank	Time	Rank	Time	Rank
ROU-1	Dragoș Panaitescu-Rapan; Paul Neagu; Costel Ionescu; Gheorghe Lixandru	Four-man	55.54	9	55.51	7	56.18	8	56.68	7	3:43.91	8
ROU-2	Ion Panţuru; Constantin Romaniuc; Alexe Gheorghe Tănăsescu; Mihai Nicolau	Four-man	56.09	15	56.23	15	56.81	12	57.57	13	3:46.70	14

== Ice hockey ==
=== First round ===
Winners (in bold) entered the Medal Round. Other teams played a consolation round for 7th-12th places.

Team 1	Score	Team 2
**Poland**	7–4	Romania

=== Consolation round ===
Rank		Pld	W	L	T	GF	GA	Pts
7	Romania	5	4	1	0	23	15	8
8	Austria	5	3	2	0	18	14	6
9	Japan	5	3	2	0	20	18	6
10	Yugoslavia	5	3	2	0	22	19	6
11	Switzerland	5	2	3	0	24	22	4
12	Bulgaria	5	0	5	0	19	38	0

- Romania 3-1 Japan
- Yugoslavia 4-3 Romania
- Austria 3-4 Romania
- Romania 9-4 Bulgaria
- Romania 4-3 Switzerland

**Contestants**; Valerian Netedu; Vasile Morar; Elöd Antal; Şandor Gal; George Justinian; Ion Ioniţă; Dezső Varga; Doru Moroşan; Doru Tureanu; Dumitru Axinte; Eduard Pană; Vasile Huțanu; Ioan Gheorghiu; Tiberiu Mikloş; Alexandru Hălăucă; Marian Pisaru; Nicolae Vişan; Marian Costea
