= Romania at the 1998 Winter Olympics =

- IOC code: ROU (ROM used at these Games)
- NOC: Romanian Olympic and Sports Committee
- Website: www.cosr.ro (in Romanian, English, and French)

in Nagano
- Competitors: 16 (12 men, 4 women) in 6 sports
- Flag bearer: Mihaela Dascălu (speed skating)
- Medals: Gold 0 Silver 0 Bronze 0 Total 0

Winter Olympics appearances (overview)
- 1928; 1932; 1936; 1948; 1952; 1956; 1960; 1964; 1968; 1972; 1976; 1980; 1984; 1988; 1992; 1994; 1998; 2002; 2006; 2010; 2014; 2018; 2022; 2026

Romania competed at the 1998 Winter Olympics in Nagano, Japan.

== Competitors ==
The following is the list of number of competitors in the Games.

| Sport | Men | Women | Total |
|---|---|---|---|
| Biathlon | 1 | 1 | 2 |
| Bobsleigh | 6 | – | 6 |
| Cross-country skiing | 1 | 1 | 2 |
| Figure skating | 1 | 0 | 1 |
| Luge | 2 | 1 | 3 |
| Speed skating | 1 | 1 | 2 |
| Total | 12 | 4 | 16 |

== Biathlon ==
Men

| Event | Athlete | Misses ^{1} | Time | Rank |
|---|---|---|---|---|
| 10 km Sprint | Marius Ene | 2 | 31:54.8 | 64 |

| Event | Athlete | Time | Misses | Adjusted time ^{2} | Rank |
|---|---|---|---|---|---|
| 20 km | Marius Ene | 1'00:23.9 | 5 | 1'05:23.9 | 60 |

Women

| Event | Athlete | Misses ^{1} | Time | Rank |
|---|---|---|---|---|
| 7.5 km Sprint | Éva Tófalvi | 2 | 25:10.3 | 31 |

| Event | Athlete | Time | Misses | Adjusted time ^{2} | Rank |
|---|---|---|---|---|---|
| 15 km | Éva Tófalvi | 55:48.6 | 1 | 56:48.6 | 11 |

^{1} A penalty loop of 150 metres had to be skied per missed target.
^{2} One minute added per missed target.

== Bobsleigh ==
| Sled | Athletes | Event | Run 1 | | Run 2 | | Run 3 | | Run 4 | | Total | |
| Sled | Athletes | Event | Time | Rank | Time | Rank | Time | Rank | Time | Rank | Time | Rank |
|---|---|---|---|---|---|---|---|---|---|---|---|---|
| ROU-1 | Paul Neagu; Gabriel Tătaru | Two-man | 56.38 | 29 | 56.10 | 28 | 55.54 | 24 | 55.64 | 24 | 3:43.66 | 25 |
| ROU-2 | Florian Enache; Mihai Dumitrașcu | Two-man | 56.03 | 26 | 55.86 | 25 | 55.97 | 26 | 55.87 | 25 | 3:43.73 | 26 |

| Sled | Athletes | Event | Run 1 | | Run 2 | | Run 3 | | Total | |
| Sled | Athletes | Event | Time | Rank | Time | Rank | Time | Rank | Time | Rank |
|---|---|---|---|---|---|---|---|---|---|---|
| ROU-1 | Florian Enache; Marian Chițescu; Iulian Păcioianu; Mihai Dumitrașcu | Four-man | 55.01 | 24 | 55.37 | 27 | 55.68 | 27 | 2:46.06 | 27 |

== Cross-country skiing ==
Men

| Event | Athlete | Race | |
| Event | Athlete | Time | Rank |
|---|---|---|---|
| 10 km C | Zsolt Antal | 31:41.0 | 69 |
| 15 km pursuit^{1} F | Zsolt Antal | 45:19.9 | 45 |
| 30 km C | Zsolt Antal | 1'43:56.6 | 45 |
| 50 km F | Zsolt Antal | DNF | – |

^{1} Starting delay based on 10 km results.
C = Classical style, F = Freestyle

Women

| Event | Athlete | Race | |
| Event | Athlete | Time | Rank |
|---|---|---|---|
| 5 km C | Monica Lăzăruț | 20:49.5 | 69 |
| 10 km pursuit^{2} F | Monica Lăzăruț | 35:27.9 | 60 |
| 15 km C | Monica Lăzăruț | 55:18.2 | 56 |
| 30 km F | Monica Lăzăruț | 1'32:41.7 | 34 |

^{2} Starting delay based on 5 km results.
C = Classical style, F = Freestyle

== Figure skating ==
Men

| Athlete | SP | FS | TFP | Rank |
|---|---|---|---|---|
| Cornel Gheorghe | 21 | 21 | 31.5 | 21 |

== Luge ==
Men

| Athlete | Run 1 | | Run 2 | | Run 3 | | Run 4 | | Total | |
| Athlete | Time | Rank | Time | Rank | Time | Rank | Time | Rank | Time | Rank |
|---|---|---|---|---|---|---|---|---|---|---|
| Ion Cristian Stanciu | 51.608 | 27 | 51.386 | 27 | 51.927 | 27 | 51.602 | 26 | 3:26.523 | 26 |

(Men's) Doubles

| Athletes | Run 1 | | Run 2 | | Total | |
| Athletes | Time | Rank | Time | Rank | Time | Rank |
|---|---|---|---|---|---|---|
| Ion Cristian Stanciu; Liviu Cepoi | 52.289 | 16 | 52.986 | 17 | 1:45.275 | 16 |

Women

| Athlete | Run 1 | | Run 2 | | Run 3 | | Run 4 | | Total | |
| Athlete | Time | Rank | Time | Rank | Time | Rank | Time | Rank | Time | Rank |
|---|---|---|---|---|---|---|---|---|---|---|
| Corina Drăgan-Terecoasa | 53.653 | 27 | 53.329 | 27 | 52.714 | 27 | 52.542 | 25 | 3:32.238 | 27 |

== Speed skating ==
Men

| Event | Athlete | Race | |
| Event | Athlete | Time | Rank |
|---|---|---|---|
| 1500 m | Dezideriu Horvath | 1:57.35 | 44 |
| 5000 m | Dezideriu Horvath | 6:57.08 | 30 |

Women

| Event | Athlete | Race | |
| Event | Athlete | Time | Rank |
|---|---|---|---|
| 1500 m | Mihaela Dascălu | 2:08.77 | 34 |
| 3000 m | Mihaela Dascălu | 4:26.65 | 24 |
