= Romania at the 2010 Winter Olympics =

- IOC code: ROU
- NOC: Romanian Olympic and Sports Committee
- Website: www.cosr.ro (in Romanian, English, and French)

in Vancouver
- Competitors: 29 in 9 sports
- Flag bearer: Éva Tófalvi
- Medals: Gold 0 Silver 0 Bronze 0 Total 0

Winter Olympics appearances (overview)
- 1928; 1932; 1936; 1948; 1952; 1956; 1960; 1964; 1968; 1972; 1976; 1980; 1984; 1988; 1992; 1994; 1998; 2002; 2006; 2010; 2014; 2018; 2022; 2026

Romania participated at the 2010 Winter Olympics in Vancouver, British Columbia, Canada. Twenty-nine athletes have qualified for the Olympiad. The Romanian flag was carried by Éva Tófalvi during the opening ceremonies.

== Alpine skiing ==
Three athletes have qualified:

Athlete	Event	Run 1	Run 2	Total	Rank
Ioan-Gabriel Nan	Men's slalom	DNF			
Ioan-Gabriel Nan	Men's giant slalom	1:23.86	1:26.15	2:50.01	49
Dragoș Staicu	Men's downhill			DNF	
Edith Miklos	Women's downhill			DNF	
Edith Miklos	Women's super-G			Did not start	
Edith Miklos	Women's slalom	Did not start			

== Biathlon ==
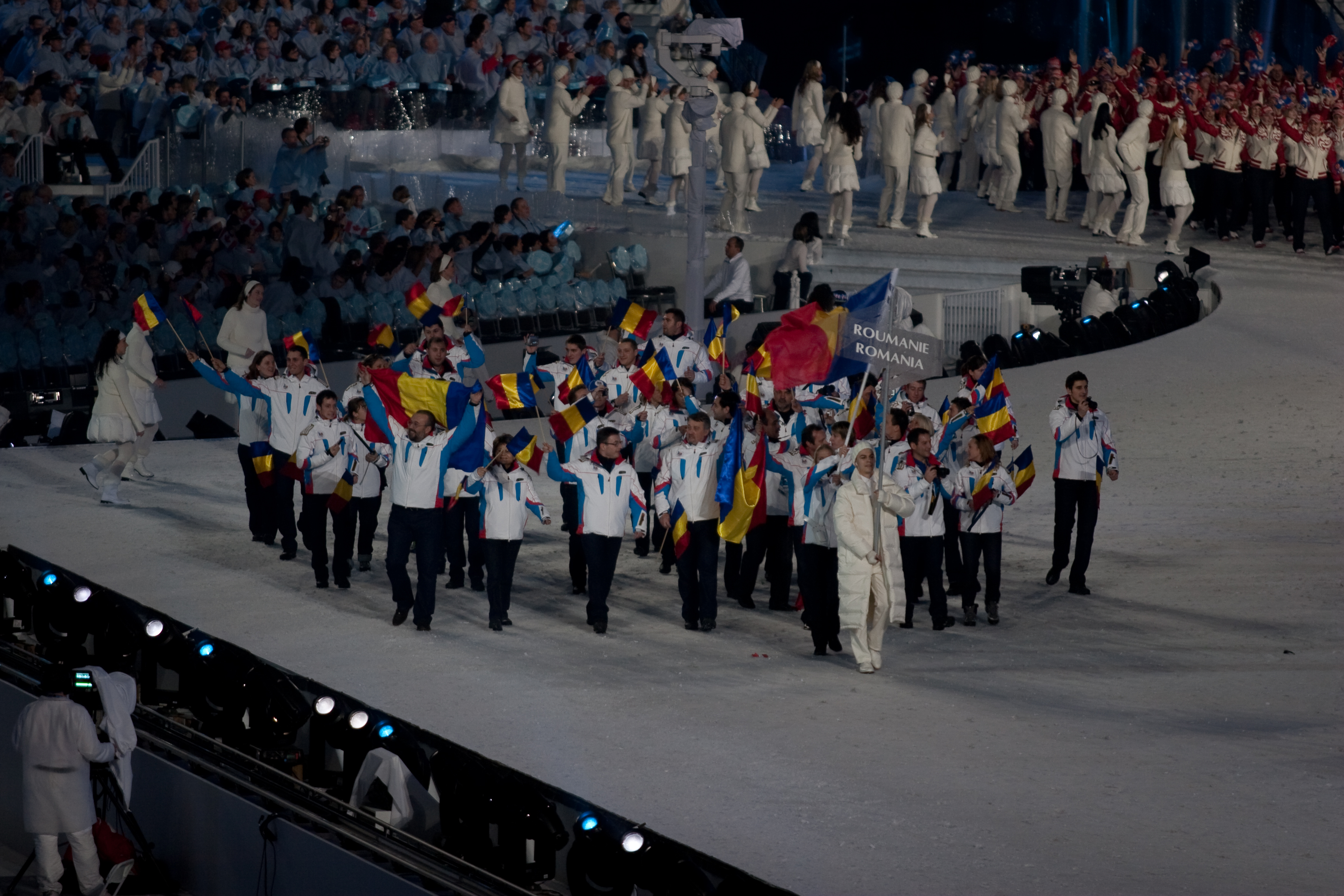
The athletes entering the stadium during the opening ceremonies.

There were five female athletes that qualified:

Athlete	Event	Final		
Athlete	Event	Time	Misses	Rank
Alexandra Rusu-Stoian	Sprint	24:04.6	4	85
Dana Plotogea	Sprint	22:13.3	2	49
Dana Plotogea	Pursuit	36:38.8	3	52
Dana Plotogea	Individual	51:01.1	7	81
Éva Tófalvi	Sprint	20:45.1	0	14
Éva Tófalvi	Pursuit	32:26.3	2	19
Éva Tófalvi	Individual	42:43.4	1	11
Éva Tófalvi	Mass start	38:00.7	5	24
Mihaela Purdea	Sprint	21:52.2	1	39
Mihaela Purdea	Pursuit	36:08.5	4	49
Mihaela Purdea	Individual	45:27.7	3	41
Reka Ferencz	Individual	48:54.9	4	74

== Bobsleigh ==
Two-man

Sled	Athletes (driver listed first)	Heat 1		Heat 2		Heat 3		Heat 4		Total	
Sled	Athletes (driver listed first)	Time	Rank	Time	Rank	Time	Rank	Time	Rank	Time	Rank
ROU 1	Nicolae Istrate; Florin Cezar Craciun	52.19	10	52.41	9	52.40	14	52.43	11	3:29.43	11

Two-woman

Sled	Athletes (driver listed first)	Heat 1		Heat 2		Heat 3		Heat 4		Total	
Sled	Athletes (driver listed first)	Time	Rank	Time	Rank	Time	Rank	Time	Rank	Time	Rank
ROU 1	Carmen Radenovici; Alina Vera Savin	54.41	18	54.46	16	54.82	16	54.58	16	3:38.27	15

Four-man

Sled	Athletes (driver listed first, brakeman last)	Heat 1		Heat 2		Heat 3		Heat 4		Total	
Sled	Athletes (driver listed first, brakeman last)	Time	Rank	Time	Rank	Time	Rank	Time	Rank	Time	Rank
ROU 1	Nicolae Istrate; Florin Cezar Craciun; Ionuţ Andrei; Ioan Dănuţ Dovalciuc	52.05	18	52.00	15	52.34	15	52.50	16	3:28.89	15

== Cross-country skiing ==
Romania has three spots for this discipline.

Distance

Athlete	Event	Final	
Athlete	Event	Time	Rank
Paul Constantin Pepene	Men's 15 km freestyle	35:33.7	37
Paul Constantin Pepene	Men's 30 km pursuit	1:19:34.1	29
Petrică Hogiu	Men's 15 km freestyle	36:39.5	57
Petrică Hogiu	Men's 30 km pursuit	Did not finish	
Monika Gyorgy	Women's 10 km freestyle	27:19.5	43
Monika Gyorgy	Women's 15 km pursuit	45:37.5	55
Monika Gyorgy	Women's 30 km classical	1:44:03.5	47

Sprint

Athlete	Event	Qualifying		Quarterfinal		Semifinal		Final	
Athlete	Event	Total	Rank	Total	Rank	Total	Rank	Total	Rank
Monika Gyorgy	Women's sprint	3:58.32	44	Did not advance					44

== Figure skating ==
Romania has qualified 1 entrant in men's singles, for a total of 1 athlete.

Athlete	Event	CD		SP/OD		FS/FD		Total	
Athlete	Event	Points	Rank	Points	Rank	Points	Rank	Points	Rank
Zoltan Kelemen	Men			51.95	29	Did not advance		51.95	29

== Freestyle skiing ==
Ski cross

Athlete	Event	Qualifying		Round of 16	Quarterfinals	Semifinals	Finals	Rank
Athlete	Event	Time	Rank	Position	Position	Position	Position	Rank
Ruxandra Nedelcu	Women's ski cross	1:23.04	33	Did not advance				33

== Luge ==
There are eight athletes qualified.

Athlete	Event	Final					
Athlete	Event	Run 1	Run 2	Run 3	Run 4	Total	Rank
Valentin Creţu	Men's singles	49.726	50.224	49.931	49.594	3:19.475	31
Raluca Strămaturaru	Women's singles	42.475	42.198	42.815	42.584	2:50.072	21
Mihaela Chiriaş	Women's singles	43.494	Did not finish				
Violeta Strămăturaru	Women's singles	Did not start					
Cosmin Chetroiu; Ionuţ Ţăran	Doubles	42.360	42.271			1:24.631	17
Paul Ifrim; Andrei Anghel	Doubles	43.007	42.466			1:25.473	20

== Short track speed skating ==
Athlete	Event	Heat		Quarterfinal		Semifinal		Final		Ranking
Athlete	Event	Time	Rank	Time	Rank	Time	Rank	Time	Rank	Ranking
Katalin Kristo	Women's 1500 metres	2:36.022	4			Did not advance				24

== Skeleton ==
It was the first time Romania sent an athlete to this event:

Athlete	Event	Final					
Athlete	Event	Run 1	Run 2	Run 3	Run 4	Total	Rank
Maria Marinela Mazilu	Women's	57.10	57.03	58.14	57.65	3:49.92	19
