= Romania at the 2006 Winter Olympics =

- IOC code: ROU (ROM used at these Games)
- NOC: Romanian Olympic and Sports Committee
- Website: www.cosr.ro (in Romanian, English, and French)

in Turin
- Competitors: 25 (16 men, 9 women) in 8 sports
- Flag bearers: Gheorghe Chiper (opening); Zsolt Antal (closing)
- Medals: Gold 0 Silver 0 Bronze 0 Total 0

Winter Olympics appearances (overview)
- 1928; 1932; 1936; 1948; 1952; 1956; 1960; 1964; 1968; 1972; 1976; 1980; 1984; 1988; 1992; 1994; 1998; 2002; 2006; 2010; 2014; 2018; 2022; 2026

Romania competed at the 2006 Winter Olympics in Turin, Italy.

== Alpine skiing ==
Athlete	Event	Final				
Athlete	Event	Run 1	Run 2	Run 3	Total	Rank
Bianca-Andreea Narea	Women's giant slalom	1:10.89	did not finish			
Florentin-Daniel Nicolae	Men's downhill	n/a			2:00.93	53
Florentin-Daniel Nicolae	Men's combined	1:45.81	53.39	52.69	3:31.89	25

Note: In the men's combined, run 1 is the downhill, and runs 2 and 3 are the slalom. In the women's combined, run 1 and 2 are the slalom, and run 3 the downhill.

== Biathlon ==
Athlete	Event	Final		
Athlete	Event	Time	Misses	Rank
Marian Blaj	Men's sprint	30:44.4	4	77
Marian Blaj	Men's individual	1:02:38.8	6	65
Dana Elena Plotogea	Women's sprint	25:01.7	1	48
Dana Elena Plotogea	Women's pursuit	43:11.08	4	33
Dana Elena Plotogea	Women's individual	1:00:45.5	7	72
Mihaela Purdea	Women's sprint	27:32.7	4	77
Mihaela Purdea	Women's individual	1:02:11.5	7	75
Alexandra Rusu	Women's sprint	24:52.5	0	45
Alexandra Rusu	Women's pursuit	Lapped		
Alexandra Rusu	Women's individual	1:00:13.7	5	68
Éva Tófalvi	Women's sprint	26:38.3	4	70
Éva Tófalvi	Women's individual	53:04.3	2	19
Dana Elena Plotogea; Éva Tófalvi; Mihaela Purdea; Alexandra Rusu	Women's relay	1:25:13.3	21	14

== Bobsleigh ==
Athlete	Event	Final					
Athlete	Event	Run 1	Run 2	Run 3	Run 4	Total	Rank
Mihai Iliescu; Levente Andrei Bartha	Two-man	57.22	57.09	57.63	did not advance		26
Nicolae Istrate; Adrian Duminicel	Two-man	56.82	56.90	57.65	did not advance		22
Nicolae Istrate; Adrian Duminicel; Gabriel Popa; Ioan Danut Dovalciuc	Four-man	56.61	56.70	56.41	did not advance		22

== Cross-country skiing ==
Distance

Athlete	Event	Final	
Athlete	Event	Total	Rank
Zsolt Antal	Men's 15 km classical	43:10.0	61
Zsolt Antal	Men's 30 km pursuit	1:22:29.8	47
Zsolt Antal	Men's 50 km freestyle	2:10:06.7	46
Mihai Găliceanu	Men's 15 km classical	44:52.0	72
Mihai Găliceanu	Men's 30 km pursuit	1:26:31.7	62
Mihai Găliceanu	Men's 50 km freestyle	Did not start	
Monika Gyorgy	Women's 10 km classical	32:44.0	60
Monika Gyorgy	Women's 15 km pursuit	50:15.3	59
Monika Gyorgy	Women's 30 km freestyle	1:35:25.4	50

Sprint

Athlete	Event	Qualifying		Quarterfinal		Semifinal		Final	
Athlete	Event	Total	Rank	Total	Rank	Total	Rank	Total	Rank
Zsolt Antal	Men's sprint	2:29.40	65	Did not advance					65
Mihai Găliceanu	Men's sprint	2:31.43	69	Did not advance					69
Monika Gyorgy	Women's sprint	2:27.53	59	Did not advance					59
Zsolt Antal; Mihai Găliceanu	Men's team sprint	n/a				19:04.3	11	Did not advance	21

== Figure skating ==
Athlete	Event	CD		SP/OD		FS/FD		Total	
Athlete	Event	Points	Rank	Points	Rank	Points	Rank	Points	Rank
Gheorghe Chiper	Men's	n/a		67.66	9 Q	118.53	17	186.19	14
Roxana Luca	Ladies'	n/a		39.37	26	did not advance			26

Key: CD = Compulsory Dance, FD = Free Dance, FS = Free Skate, OD = Original Dance, SP = Short Program

== Luge ==
Athlete	Event	Final					
Athlete	Event	Run 1	Run 2	Run 3	Run 4	Total	Rank
Cosmin Chetroiu; Ionuţ Ţăran	Doubles	48.625	50.968	n/a		1:39.593	18
Eugen Radu; Marian Lăzărescu	Doubles	49.526	48.537	n/a		1:37.883	15

== Short track speed skating ==
Athlete	Event	Heat		Quarterfinal		Semifinal		Final	
Athlete	Event	Time	Rank	Time	Rank	Time	Rank	Time	Rank
Kătălin Kristo	Women's 500 m	46.531	4	did not advance					23
Kătălin Kristo	Women's 1000 m	1:34.506	4	did not advance					22
Kătălin Kristo	Women's 1500 m	2:31.705	4	did not advance					18

== Speed skating ==
Athlete	Event	Race 1		Final	
Athlete	Event	Time	Rank	Time	Rank
Claudiu Grozea	Men's 5000 m	n/a		6:50.29	26
Daniela Oltean	Women's 1000 m	n/a		1:21.70	35
Daniela Oltean	Women's 1500 m	n/a		2:09.24	35
Daniela Oltean	Women's 3000 m	n/a		4:23.34	26
