= Romania at the 1988 Winter Olympics =

- IOC code: ROU (ROM used at these Games)
- NOC: Romanian Olympic and Sports Committee
- Website: www.cosr.ro (in Romanian, English, and French)

in Calgary
- Competitors: 11 (5 men, 6 women) in 4 sports
- Flag bearer: Dorin Degan
- Medals: Gold 0 Silver 0 Bronze 0 Total 0

Winter Olympics appearances (overview)
- 1928; 1932; 1936; 1948; 1952; 1956; 1960; 1964; 1968; 1972; 1976; 1980; 1984; 1988; 1992; 1994; 1998; 2002; 2006; 2010; 2014; 2018; 2022; 2026

Romania competed at the 1988 Winter Olympics in Calgary, Canada.

== Competitors ==
The following is the list of number of competitors in the Games.

Sport	Men	Women	Total
Alpine skiing	0	1	1
Bobsleigh	5	–	5
Cross-country skiing	0	4	4
Luge	0	1	1
Total	5	6	11

== Alpine skiing ==
Women

Athlete	Event	Race 1	Race 2	Total	
Athlete	Event	Time	Time	Time	Rank
Mihaela Fera	Downhill			DNF	–
Mihaela Fera	Super-G			1:25.55	34
Mihaela Fera	Giant Slalom	DNF	–	DNF	–
Mihaela Fera	Slalom	58.35	DNF	DNF	–

Women's combined

Athlete	Downhill	Slalom		Total	
Athlete	Time	Time 1	Time 2	Points	Rank
Mihaela Fera	1:19.82	45.17	46.37	141.75	21

== Bobsleigh ==
Sled	Athletes	Event	Run 1		Run 2		Run 3		Run 4		Total	
Sled	Athletes	Event	Time	Rank	Time	Rank	Time	Rank	Time	Rank	Time	Rank
ROU-1	Csaba Nagy Lakatos; Costel Petrariu	Two-man	58.83	23	1:00.82	28	1:01.75	28	1:00.62	25	4:02.02	24
ROU-2	Dorin Degan; Grigore Anghel	Two-man	58.85	24	1:01.00	33	1:01.81	29	1:01.14	28	4:02.80	27

Sled	Athletes	Event	Run 1		Run 2		Run 3		Run 4		Total	
Sled	Athletes	Event	Time	Rank	Time	Rank	Time	Rank	Time	Rank	Time	Rank
ROU-1	Csaba Nagy Lakatos; Grigore Anghel; Florin Olteanu; Costel Petrariu	Four-man	57.41	18	58.49	19	57.64	21	58.35	19	3:51.89	20

== Cross-country skiing ==
Women

Event	Athlete	Race	
Event	Athlete	Time	Rank
5 km C	Ileana Hangan-Ianoşiu	DNF	–
5 km C	Mihaela Cârstoi	18:21.6	51
10 km C	Adina Țuțulan-Șotropa	35:31.1	47
10 km C	Rodica Drăguş	33:51.4	39
20 km F	Mihaela Cârstoi	1'06:59.5	48
20 km F	Adina Țuțulan-Șotropa	1'05:48.6	46
20 km F	Rodica Drăguş	1'03:06.0	39

C = Classical style, F = Freestyle

Women's 4 × 5 km relay

Athletes	Race	
Athletes	Time	Rank
Ileana Hangan-Ianoşiu; Mihaela Cârstoi; Adina Țuțulan-Șotropa; Rodica Drăguş	1'10:59.9	12

== Luge ==
Women

Athlete	Run 1		Run 2		Run 3		Run 4		Total	
Athlete	Time	Rank	Time	Rank	Time	Rank	Time	Rank	Time	Rank
Livia Pelin	47.204	17	47.541	17	47.601	16	47.305	17	3:09.651	17
