= Romania at the 2014 Winter Olympics =

- IOC code: ROU
- NOC: Romanian Olympic and Sports Committee
- Website: www.cosr.ro (in Romanian, English, and French)

in Sochi
- Competitors: 24 in 7 sports
- Flag bearers: Éva Tófalvi (opening and closing)
- Medals: Gold 0 Silver 0 Bronze 0 Total 0

Winter Olympics appearances (overview)
- 1928; 1932; 1936; 1948; 1952; 1956; 1960; 1964; 1968; 1972; 1976; 1980; 1984; 1988; 1992; 1994; 1998; 2002; 2006; 2010; 2014; 2018; 2022; 2026

Romania competed at the 2014 Winter Olympics in Sochi, Russia, from 7 to 23 February 2014. A team of 24 athletes in seven sports was announced on 24 January 2014, representing a decline of five athletes from four years prior. The best results were two 17th places in bobsleigh.

== Alpine skiing ==
According to the final quota allocation released on 20 January 2014, Romania had two male athletes and a female athlete in qualification position.

Athlete	Event	Run 1		Run 2		Total	
Athlete	Event	Time	Rank	Time	Rank	Time	Rank
Ioan Valeriu Achiriloaie	Men's downhill	—				2:17.46	46
Ioan Valeriu Achiriloaie	Men's combined	DNF					
Alexandru Barbu	Men's giant slalom	1:29.47	52	1:29.77	47	2:59.24	48
Alexandru Barbu	Men's slalom	52.82	44	59.84	21	1:52.66	21
Ania Monica Caill	Women's downhill	—				DNF	
Ania Monica Caill	Women's super-G	—				1:33.73	30
Ania Monica Caill	Women's combined	1:51.91	34	1:02.04	22	2:53.95	22
Ania Monica Caill	Women's giant slalom	1:28.53	55	1:28.73	51	2:57.26	51

== Biathlon ==
Based on their performance at the 2012 and 2013 Biathlon World Championships, Romania qualified 1 man and 1 woman.

Athlete	Event	Time	Misses	Rank
Cornel Puchianu	Men's sprint	25:50.7	0 (0+0)	30
Cornel Puchianu	Men's pursuit	38:19.8	6 (0+2+1+3)	47
Cornel Puchianu	Men's individual	56:10.4	4 (0+0+1+3)	60
Éva Tófalvi	Women's sprint	22:01.5	1 (1+0)	22
Éva Tófalvi	Women's pursuit	32:15.3	3 (1+2+0+0)	26
Éva Tófalvi	Women's individual	47:30.8	1 (0+0+1+0)	21
Éva Tófalvi	Women's mass start	37:50.9	2 (1+0+0+1)	20

== Bobsleigh ==
Romania had two sleds in qualification position for a total of four athletes.

Athlete	Event	Run 1		Run 2		Run 3		Run 4		Total	
Athlete	Event	Time	Rank	Time	Rank	Time	Rank	Time	Rank	Time	Rank
Florin Cezar Crăciun; Nicolae Istrate*	Two-man	57.39	17	57.19	17	57.24	17	57.16	18	3:48.98	17
Dănuț Moldovan; Paul Muntean; Andreas Neagu*; Bogdan Laurentiu Otavă	Four-man	56.25	=23	56.16	22	56.62	27	did not advance		2:49.03	24
Maria Constantin*; Andreea Grecu	Two-woman	59.04	17	59.08	17	59.38	17	59.09	16	3:56.59	17

* – Denotes the driver of each sled

== Cross-country skiing ==
According to the final quota allocation released on 20 January 2014, Romania had three athletes in qualification position.

Distance

Athlete	Event	Classical		Freestyle		Final		
Athlete	Event	Time	Rank	Time	Rank	Time	Deficit	Rank
Paul Constantin Pepene	Men's 15 km classical	—				43:39.4	+5:09.7	62
Paul Constantin Pepene	Men's 30 km skiathlon	37:52.5	45	35:10.4	52	1:13:36.2	+5:20.8	48
Tímea Sára	Women's 10 km classical	—				34:48.2	+6:30.4	59
Tímea Sára	Women's 15 km skiathlon	22:54.0	60	23:10.5	60	46:43.0	+8:09.4	60

Sprint

Athlete	Event	Qualification		Quarterfinal		Semifinal		Final	
Athlete	Event	Time	Rank	Time	Rank	Time	Rank	Time	Rank
Paul Constantin Pepene	Men's sprint	3:51.54	65	did not advance					
Daniel Pripici	Men's sprint	3:52.68	68	did not advance					
Paul Constantin Pepene; Daniel Pripici	Men's team sprint	—				26:06.80	9	did not advance	
Tímea Sára	Women's sprint	2:48.16	49	did not advance					

== Figure skating ==
Romania qualified 1 entrant in men's singles.

Athlete	Event	SP		FS		Total	
Athlete	Event	Points	Rank	Points	Rank	Points	Rank
Zoltán Kelemen	Men's singles	60.41	24 Q	98.35	23	158.76	23

== Luge ==
Romania qualified a total of four athletes, and a spot in the team relay for the first time, by virtue of having a sled in all the individual events. The doubles sled (and the mixed relay) could not compete as their sled broke.

Athlete	Event	Run 1		Run 2		Run 3		Run 4		Total	
Athlete	Event	Time	Rank	Time	Rank	Time	Rank	Time	Rank	Time	Rank
Valentin Crețu	Men's singles	53.562	31	53.279	27	52.902	28	53.142	32	3:32.885	29
Nicolae Șovăială; Alexandru Teodorescu	Men's doubles	DNS				—				DNS	
Raluca Strămăturaru	Women's singles	52.862	31	51.821	29	52.238	29	52.083	27	3:29.004	30
Valentin Crețu; Nicolae Șovăială; Alexandru Teodorescu; Raluca Strămăturaru	Mixed team relay	DNS						—		DNS	

== Skeleton ==
Romania had one athlete in qualification position.

Athlete	Event	Run 1		Run 2		Run 3		Run 4		Total	
Athlete	Event	Time	Rank	Time	Rank	Time	Rank	Time	Rank	Time	Rank
Dorin Dumitru Velicu	Men's	58.72	27	58.44	25	58.91	27	did not advance		2:56.07	25
Maria Marinela Mazilu	Women's	59.99	19	59.89	20	59.63	20	59.11	20	3:58.62	20

== Ski jumping ==
Romania received the following start quotas:

Athlete	Event	Qualification			First round			Final			Total	
Athlete	Event	Distance	Points	Rank	Distance	Points	Rank	Distance	Points	Rank	Points	Rank
Sorin Iulian Pîtea	Men's normal hill	86.0	90.2	45	did not advance							
Sorin Iulian Pîtea	Men's large hill	101.5	59.6	51	did not advance							

== See also ==
- Romania at the 2014 Summer Youth Olympics
