= Romania at the 2022 Winter Olympics =

- Flag of Romania
- IOC code: ROU
- NOC: Romanian Olympic Committee
- Website: www.cosr.ro (in Romanian)

in Beijing, China 4–20 February 2022
- Competitors: 21 (13 men and 8 women) in 7 sports
- Flag bearers (opening): Raluca Strămăturaru; Paul Pepene
- Flag bearer (closing): Andreea Grecu
- Medals: Gold 0 Silver 0 Bronze 0 Total 0

Winter Olympics appearances (overview)
- 1928; 1932; 1936; 1948; 1952; 1956; 1960; 1964; 1968; 1972; 1976; 1980; 1984; 1988; 1992; 1994; 1998; 2002; 2006; 2010; 2014; 2018; 2022; 2026

Romania competed at the 2022 Winter Olympics in Beijing, China, from 4 to 20 February 2022.

On January 20, 2022, luger Raluca Strămăturaru and cross-country skier Paul Pepene were named as the flagbearers for the team during the opening ceremony. Meanwhile bobsledder Andreea Grecu was the flagbearer during the closing ceremony.

== Competitors ==
The following is the list of number of competitors participating at the Games per sport/discipline.

Sport	Men	Women	Total
Alpine skiing	1	1	2
Biathlon	1	1	2
Bobsleigh	4	2	6
Cross-country skiing	2	1	3
Luge	3	1	4
Ski jumping	2	1	3
Speed skating	0	1	1
Total	13	8	21

== Alpine skiing ==
By meeting the basic qualification standards, Romania has qualified one male and one female alpine skier.

Athlete	Event	Run 1		Run 2		Total	
Athlete	Event	Time	Rank	Time	Rank	Time	Rank
Alexandru Ștefănescu	Men's giant slalom	1:14.20	38	1:19.01	33	2:33.21	32
Alexandru Ștefănescu	Men's slalom	1:01.72	39	58.70	35	2:00.42	35
Maria Constantin	Women's giant slalom	1:08.25	50	1:10.25	45	2:18.50	45
Maria Constantin	Women's slalom	DNF		did not advance			

== Biathlon ==
Athlete	Event	Time	Misses	Rank
George Colțea	Men's sprint	27:54.7	2 (1+1)	89
Natalia Ushkina	Women's individual	51:04.1	2 (0+1+1+0)	56
Natalia Ushkina	Women's sprint	24:14.3	2 (1+1)	71

== Bobsleigh ==
Athlete	Event	Run 1		Run 2		Run 3		Run 4		Total	
Athlete	Event	Time	Rank	Time	Rank	Time	Rank	Time	Rank	Time	Rank
Mihai Cristian Tentea; Ciprian Nicolae Daroczi	Two-man	59.83	12	1:00.46	22	1:00.19	15	1:00.28	16	4:00.76	16
Mihai Tentea; Raul Dobre; Ciprian Daroczi; Cristian Radu	Four-man	58.87	10	59.55	13	59.30	14	59.93	18	3:57.65	=13
Andreea Grecu	Monobob	1:05.56	11	1:05.71	8	1:06.46	15	1:06.26	10	4:23.99	12
Andreea Grecu; Katharina Wick	Two-woman	1:01.82	9	1:02.47	20	1:02.25	16	1:02.44	18	4:08.98	18

== Cross-country skiing ==
Romania qualified two male and one female cross-country skier.

Distance

Athlete	Event	Classical		Freestyle		Final		
Athlete	Event	Time	Rank	Time	Rank	Time	Deficit	Rank
Paul Pepene	Men's 30 km skiathlon	41:39.3	29	40:30.4	28	1:22:41.4	+6:31.6	28
Tímea Lőrincz	Women's 10 km classical	—N/a				37:15.3	+9:09.0	86

Sprint

Athlete	Event	Qualification		Quarterfinal		Semifinal		Final	
Athlete	Event	Time	Rank	Time	Rank	Time	Rank	Time	Rank
Raul Popa	Men's	2:59.85	47	did not advance					
Paul Pepene; Raul Popa	Men's team	—N/a				21:03.35	9	Did not advance	18
Tímea Lőrincz	Women's	3:55.15	78	did not advance					

== Luge ==
Athlete	Event	Run 1		Run 2		Run 3		Run 4		Total	
Athlete	Event	Time	Rank	Time	Rank	Time	Rank	Time	Rank	Time	Rank
Valentin Cretu	Men's singles	58.349	20	58.362	15	1:02.223	34	did not advance		2:58.934	29
Raluca Strămăturaru	Women's singles	1:01:357	31	1:00.305	27	DNF					
Vasile Gîtlan; Darius Şerban	Men's doubles	59.694	13	1:00.243	16	—N/a				1:59.937	14

Mixed

Athlete	Event	Run 1		Run 2		Run 3		Total	
Athlete	Event	Time	Rank	Time	Rank	Time	Rank	Time	Rank
Raluca Strămăturaru; Valentin Cretu; Vasile Gîtlan; Darius Şerban	Team relay	1:01.402	9	1:02.743	10	1:03.547	10	3:07.692	9

== Ski jumping ==
Athlete	Event	Qualifying			First round			Final			Total	
Athlete	Event	Distance	Points	Rank	Distance	Points	Rank	Distance	Points	Rank	Points	Rank
Daniel Cacina	Men's large hill	114.0	88.8	44 Q	119.0	97.8	46	did not advance				
Andrei Feldorean	Men's large hill	104.5	69.0	52	did not advance							
Daniel Cacina	Men's normal hill	83.5	70.9	40 Q	89.5	95.8	48	did not advance				
Andrei Feldorean	Men's normal hill	76.5	55.0	45 Q	82.0	84.3	50	did not advance				
Daniela Haralambie	Women's normal hill	—N/a			88.5	83.0	19 Q	79.5	73.2	25	156.2	25

== Speed skating ==
Individual

Athlete	Event	Time	Rank
Mihaela Hogaş	500 m	39.45	29
Mihaela Hogaş	1000 m	1:19.33	29
