= Romania at the 2026 Winter Olympics =

- Flag of Romania
- IOC code: ROU
- NOC: Romanian Olympic Committee
- Website: www.cosr.ro (in Romanian)

in Milan and Cortina d'Ampezzo, Italy 6 February 2026 – 22 February 2026
- Competitors: 28 (17 men and 11 women) in 8 sports
- Flag bearers (opening): Mihai Tentea & Julia Sauter
- Flag bearer (closing): Julia Sauter
- Medals: Gold 0 Silver 0 Bronze 0 Total 0

Winter Olympics appearances (overview)
- 1928; 1932; 1936; 1948; 1952; 1956; 1960; 1964; 1968; 1972; 1976; 1980; 1984; 1988; 1992; 1994; 1998; 2002; 2006; 2010; 2014; 2018; 2022; 2026

A total of 28 athletes competed for Romania at the 2026 Winter Olympics in Milan and Cortina d'Ampezzo, Italy, from 6 to 22 February 2026. The 5th place for the 2-men team in bobsleigh represents the best result of Romanian athletes at the Winter Olympic Games since 1992.

Mihai Tentea and Julia Sauter were the country's flagbearer during the opening ceremony. Julia Sauter was also the country's flagbearer during the closing ceremony.

== Competitors ==
The following is the list of number of competitors participating at the Games per sport/discipline.

Sport	Men	Women	Total
Alpine skiing	1	1	2
Biathlon	4	1	5
Bobsleigh	4	0	4
Cross-country skiing	2	1	3
Figure skating	0	1	1
Luge	4	3	7
Ski jumping	2	2	4
Snowboarding	0	2	2
Total	17	11	28

== Alpine skiing ==
Romania qualified one female and one male alpine skier through the basic quota.

Athlete	Event	Run 1		Run 2		Total	
Athlete	Event	Time	Rank	Time	Rank	Time	Rank
Alexandru Ștefan Ștefănescu	Men's giant slalom	1:25.17	51	1:17.53	42	2:42.70	43
Alexandru Ștefan Ștefănescu	Men's slalom	1:05.58	32	1:03.52	31	2:09.10	30
Sofia Maria Moldovan	Women's giant slalom	1:12.46	55	1:17.41	45	2:29.87	46
Sofia Maria Moldovan	Women's slalom	53.21	51	DNF			

== Biathlon ==
Romania qualified four male biathletes through the 2024–25 Biathlon World Cup score. Additionally, Romania qualified one female biathlete via the IBU Qualifying Points List.

Athlete	Event	Time	Misses	Rank
George Buta	Men's individual	57:46.8	1 (1+0+0+0)	39
George Buta	Men's sprint	26:15.2	1 (1+0)	68
George Colțea	Men's individual	58:50.7	3 (1+1+0+1)	54
George Colțea	Men's sprint	26:14.9	2 (0+2)	67
Raul Flore	Men's individual	1:06:25.1	4 (1+1+0+2)	89
Raul Flore	Men's sprint	27:36.9	1 (0+1)	87
Dmitrii Shamaev	Men's individual	1:00:59.2	2 (1+0+0+1)	70
Dmitrii Shamaev	Men's sprint	25:43.3	1 (1+0)	54
Dmitrii Shamaev	Men's pursuit	35:37.4	1 (1+0+0+0)	38
Dmitrii Shamaev; George Buta; George Colțea; Raul Flore	Men's relay	LAP		20
Anastasia Tolmacheva	Women's individual	48:30.0	2 (0+1+1+0)	74
Anastasia Tolmacheva	Women's sprint	23:18.9	1 (0+1)	59
Anastasia Tolmacheva	Women's pursuit	36:13.4	3 (2+0+1+0)	56

== Bobsleigh ==
Athlete	Event	Run 1		Run 2		Run 3		Run 4		Total	
Athlete	Event	Time	Rank	Time	Rank	Time	Rank	Time	Rank	Time	Rank
Mihai Tentea*; George Iordache	Two-man	55.73	10	55.65	3	55.46	6	55.53	5	3:42.37	5
Mihai Tentea*; Constantin Dinescu; George Iordache (runs 1–3); Andrei Nica (run 4); Mihai Păcioianu	Four-man	55.05	16	55.12	13	55.05	14	55.21	16	3:40.43	17

== Cross-country skiing ==
Romania qualified one female and one male cross-country skier through the basic quota. Following the completion of the 2024–25 FIS Cross-Country World Cup, Romania qualified a further one male athlete.

Distance

Athlete	Event	Classical		Freestyle		Final		
Athlete	Event	Time	Rank	Time	Rank	Time	Deficit	Rank
Gabriel Cojocaru	Men's 10 km freestyle	—N/a		23:43.3	65	—N/a		
Gabriel Cojocaru	Men's 20 km skiathlon	26:48.0	60	25:39.3	51	53:00.2	6:49.2	54
Gabriel Cojocaru	Men's 50 km classical	LAP	49	—N/a		—N/a		
Paul Pepene	Men's 10 km freestyle	—N/a		23:04.9	52	—N/a		
Paul Pepene	Men's 20 km skiathlon	26:07.9	52	24:38.2	47	51:18.2	5:07.2	50
Paul Pepene	Men's 50 km classical	LAP	47	—N/a		—N/a		
Delia Reit	Women's 10 km freestyle	—N/a		30:18.3	96	—N/a		

Sprint

Athlete	Event	Qualification		Quarterfinal		Semifinal		Final	
Athlete	Event	Time	Rank	Time	Rank	Time	Rank	Time	Rank
Gabriel Cojocaru	Men's sprint	3:32.17	63	Did not advance					
Paul Pepene	Men's sprint	3:37.60	72	Did not advance					
Delia Reit	Women's sprint	4:31.50	85	Did not advance					
Gabriel Cojocaru; Paul Pepene	Men's team sprint	6:20.24	24	—N/a				Did not advance	

== Figure skating ==
In the 2025 World Figure Skating Championships in Boston, the United States, Romania secured one quota in each of the women's singles.

Athlete	Event	SP/SD		FP/FD		Total	
Athlete	Event	Points	Rank	Points	Rank	Points	Rank
Julia Sauter	Women's singles	63.13	16 Q	127.80	16	190.93	17

== Luge ==
Men

Athlete	Event	Run 1		Run 2		Run 3		Run 4		Total	
Athlete	Event	Time	Rank	Time	Rank	Time	Rank	Time	Rank	Time	Rank
Eduard Mihai Crăciun	Men's singles	54.784	25	54.809	24	54.177	23	Did not advance		-	23
Valentin Crețu	Men's singles	53.702	12	53.780	13	53.526	11	53.978	19	3:34.986	15
Marian Gîtlan; Darius Șerban	Men's doubles	54.144	16	54.046	17	—N/a				1:48.190	17

Women

Athlete	Event	Run 1		Run 2		Run 3		Run 4		Total	
Athlete	Event	Time	Rank	Time	Rank	Time	Rank	Time	Rank	Time	Rank
Ioana Buzatoiu	Women's singles	54.062	21	55.786	25	54.418	25	Did not advance		2:44.266	25
Mihaela-Carmen Manolescu; Raluca Strămăturaru	Women's doubles	54.339	9	54.405	10	—N/a				1:48.744	9

Mixed

Athlete	Event	Women's singles		Men's doubles		Men's singles		Women's doubles		Total	
Athlete	Event	Time	Rank	Time	Rank	Time	Rank	Time	Rank	Time	Rank
Ioana Buzatoiu; Vasile Gitlan / Darius Șerban; Valentin Crețu; Mihaela-Carmen Manolescu / Raluca Strămăturaru	Team relay	56.794	8	59.710	9	55.591	7	57.836	9	3:49.931	9

== Ski jumping ==
Men

Athlete	Event	First round			Second round			Final round			Total	
Athlete	Event	Distance	Points	Rank	Distance	Points	Rank	Distance	Points	Rank	Points	Rank
Daniel Cacina	Normal hill	94.0	109.6	46	—N/a			Did not advance				
Daniel Cacina	Large hill	117.0	95.4	46	—N/a			Did not advance				
Mihnea Spulber	Normal hill	87.5	91.0	49	—N/a			Did not advance				
Mihnea Spulber	Large hill	99.5	60.6	49	—N/a			Did not advance				
Daniel Cacina; Mihnea Spulber	Super team large hill	223.5	182.1	17	Did not advance							

Women

Athlete	Event	First round			Final round			Total	
Athlete	Event	Distance	Points	Rank	Distance	Points	Rank	Points	Rank
Delia Folea	Normal hill	79.5	78.3	48	Did not advance				
Delia Folea	Large hill	87.0	42.6	47	Did not advance				
Daniela Toth	Normal hill	92.0	109.2	29	92.0	98.2	30	207.4	30
Daniela Toth	Large hill	112.5	93.3	34	Did not advance				

Mixed

Athlete	Event	First round			Final round			Total	
Athlete	Event	Distance	Points	Rank	Distance	Points	Rank	Points	Rank
Andrei Cacina; Delia Folea; Mihnea Spulber; Daniela Toth	Mixed team	347.0	393.1	12	Did not advance				

== Snowboarding ==
Cross

Athlete	Event	Seeding		1/8 final	Quarterfinal	Semifinal	Final	
Athlete	Event	Time	Rank	Position	Position	Position	Position	Rank
Henrietta Bartalis	Women's	1:19.56	31	4	Did not advance			
Kata Mandel	Women's	1:17.13	27	3	Did not advance			
