= Alexandru Ionescu =

Alexandru Ionescu may refer to:

- Alexandru Ionescu (bobsledder) (1903-?), Romanian bobsledder
- Alexandru Ionescu (socialist militant) (1862-1929), Romanian socialist militant
