= Mogoșești =

- Commune
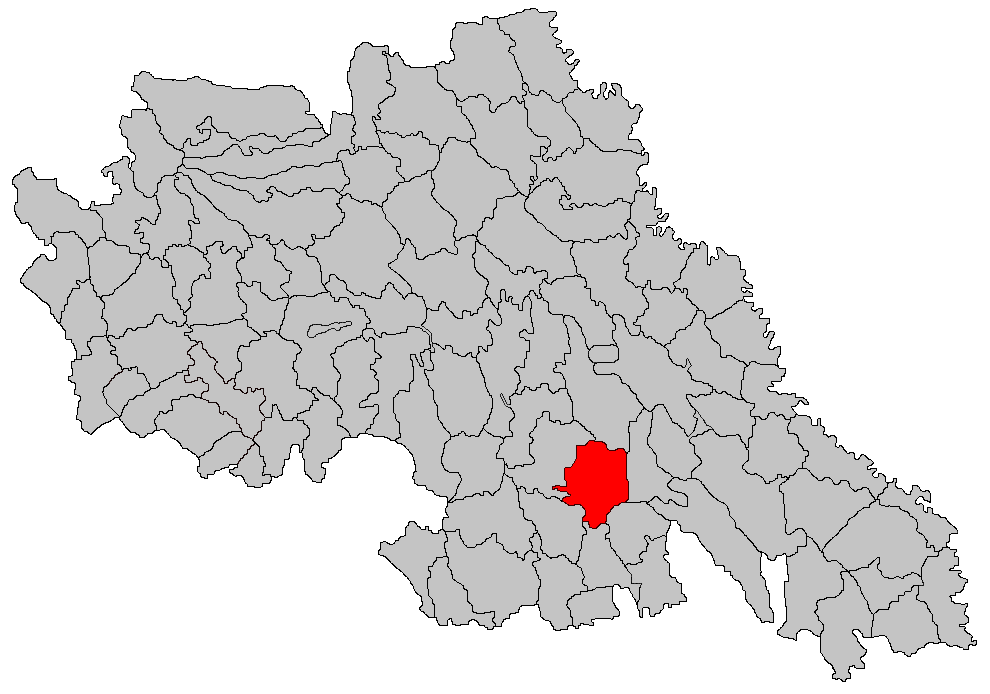
- Location in Iași County

- Location in Romania
- Coordinates: 47°2′N 27°31′E
- Country: Romania
- County: Iași

Government
  - Mayor (2024–2028): Ionel Baraboi (PSD)
- Area: 67.72 km^{2} (26.15 sq mi)
- Elevation: 168 m (551 ft)
- Population (2021-12-01): 4,706
  - Density: 69/km^{2} (180/sq mi)
- Time zone: EET/EEST (UTC+2/+3)
- Postal code: 707330
- Area code: +(40) 232
- Vehicle reg.: IS
- Website: mogosesti-primaria.ro

Mogoșești, also known as Mogoșești-Iași, is a commune in Iași County, Western Moldavia, Romania. It is composed of four villages: Budești, Hadâmbu, Mânjești, and Mogoșești.

The commune is located in the southern part of Iași County, 17 km (11 mi) southwest of the county seat, the municipality of Iași.

== Natives ==
- Gheorghe Maftei (born 1939), bobsledder
