= Romania at the Olympics =

- IOC code: ROU
- NOC: Romanian Olympic and Sports Committee
- Website: www.cosr.ro (in Romanian, English, and French)
- Medals Ranked 21st: Gold 93 Silver 101 Bronze 124 Total 318

Summer appearances
- 1900; 1904–1920; 1924; 1928; 1932; 1936; 1948; 1952; 1956; 1960; 1964; 1968; 1972; 1976; 1980; 1984; 1988; 1992; 1996; 2000; 2004; 2008; 2012; 2016; 2020; 2024

Winter appearances
- 1928; 1932; 1936; 1948; 1952; 1956; 1960; 1964; 1968; 1972; 1976; 1980; 1984; 1988; 1992; 1994; 1998; 2002; 2006; 2010; 2014; 2018; 2022; 2026

Romania first participated at the Olympic Games in 1900, with a single participant. The National Olympic Committee for Romania is the Romanian Olympic and Sports Committee, and was created and recognized in 1914. The nation first sent a team to compete at the Games in 1924, and has only missed two editions each of the Summer Olympic Games and Winter Olympic Games since then. Notably, Romania was the lone Eastern Bloc nation to participate in the 1984 Summer Olympics, which the other nations boycotted. That was also Romania's most successful Olympic Games: they won 20 gold medals and 53 medals in total.

Gymnastics is Romania's top medal-producing sport. Romania has won the third highest total number of medals (after Hungary, and Poland) of nations that have never hosted the Games.

== History ==
From the 1972 Summer Olympics through the 2012 Summer Olympics, Romania had qualified a women's team for the gymnastics team all-around. They had won medals at every Olympics from the 1976 Summer Olympics through to the 2012 Summer Games. However, the women's team failed to qualify for the 2016 Summer Olympics, ending the 40-year run in medals, and the 44-year run of having a team at the Olympics.

At the winter Olympics Romania has won only one medal, at the 1968 Winter Olympics with two-man bobsleigh team led by Ion Panțuru and Nicolae Neagoe.

== Medal tables ==
=== Medals by Summer Games ===
Games	Athletes	Gold	Silver	Bronze	Total	Rank
(French Third Republic) 1900 Paris	1	0	0	0	0	–
1904–1920	did not participate					
(French Third Republic) 1924 Paris	35	0	0	1	1	23
(Netherlands) 1928 Amsterdam	21	0	0	0	0	–
(United States) 1932 Los Angeles	did not participate					
(Nazi Germany) 1936 Berlin	54	0	1	0	1	25
(United Kingdom) 1948 London	did not participate					
(Finland) 1952 Helsinki	114	1	1	2	4	23
(Australia) 1956 Melbourne	44	5	3	5	13	9
(Italy) 1960 Rome	98	3	1	6	10	11
(Japan) 1964 Tokyo	138	2	4	6	12	14
1968 Mexico City	82	4	6	5	15	12
(West Germany) 1972 Munich	159	3	6	7	16	13
(Canada) 1976 Montreal	157	4	9	14	27	9
(Soviet Union) 1980 Moscow	228	6	6	13	25	7
(United States) 1984 Los Angeles	124	20	16	17	53	2
(South Korea) 1988 Seoul	68	7	11	6	24	8
(Spain) 1992 Barcelona	172	4	6	8	18	14
(United States) 1996 Atlanta	165	4	7	9	20	14
(Australia) 2000 Sydney	145	11	6	9	26	11
(Greece) 2004 Athens	108	8	5	6	19	14
(China) 2008 Beijing	102	4	1	4	9	17
(United Kingdom) 2012 London	103	2	4	1	7	31
(Brazil) 2016 Rio de Janeiro	97	1	1	2	4	47
(Japan) 2020 Tokyo	101	1	3	0	4	46
(France) 2024 Paris	106	3	4	2	9	23
(United States) 2028 Los Angeles	future event					
(Australia) 2032 Brisbane	future event					
Total (23/30)	2,422	93	101	123	317	17

=== Medals by Winter Games ===
Games	Athletes	Gold	Silver	Bronze	Total	Rank
(Switzerland) 1928 St. Moritz	10	0	0	0	0	–
(United States) 1932 Lake Placid	4	0	0	0	0	–
(Nazi Germany) 1936 Garmisch-Partenkirchen	15	0	0	0	0	–
(Switzerland) 1948 St. Moritz	7	0	0	0	0	–
(Norway) 1952 Oslo	16	0	0	0	0	–
(Italy) 1956 Cortina d'Ampezzo	19	0	0	0	0	–
(United States) 1960 Squaw Valley	did not participate					
(Austria) 1964 Innsbruck	27	0	0	0	0	–
(France) 1968 Grenoble	30	0	0	1	1	15
(Japan) 1972 Sapporo	13	0	0	0	0	–
(Austria) 1976 Innsbruck	32	0	0	0	0	–
(United States) 1980 Lake Placid	35	0	0	0	0	–
(Socialist Federal Republic of Yugoslavia) 1984 Sarajevo	19	0	0	0	0	–
(Canada) 1988 Calgary	11	0	0	0	0	–
(France) 1992 Albertville	23	0	0	0	0	–
(Norway) 1994 Lillehammer	23	0	0	0	0	–
(Japan) 1998 Nagano	16	0	0	0	0	–
(United States) 2002 Salt Lake City	21	0	0	0	0	–
(Italy) 2006 Turin	25	0	0	0	0	–
(Canada) 2010 Vancouver	29	0	0	0	0	–
(Russia) 2014 Sochi	24	0	0	0	0	–
(South Korea) 2018 Pyeongchang	27	0	0	0	0	–
(China) 2022 Beijing	21	0	0	0	0	–
(Italy) 2026 Milano Cortina	28	0	0	0	0	–
(France) 2030 French Alps	future event					
(United States) 2034 Utah	future event					
Total (23/25)	475	0	0	1	1	50

=== Medals by summer sport ===
Sport	Gold	Silver	Bronze	Total
Gymnastics	25	21	27	73
Rowing	22	15	9	46
Athletics	11	14	10	35
Canoeing	10	10	14	34
Wrestling	7	8	19	34
Shooting	6	4	5	15
Fencing	4	6	7	17
Swimming	4	2	5	11
Weightlifting	2	7	3	12
Boxing	1	9	15	25
Judo	1	2	3	6
Handball	0	1	3	4
Equestrian	0	1	1	2
Tennis	0	1	0	1
Rugby	0	0	1	1
Volleyball	0	0	1	1
Totals (16 entries)	93	101	123	317

=== Medals by winter sport ===
Sport	Gold	Silver	Bronze	Total
Bobsleigh	0	0	1	1
Totals (1 entries)	0	0	1	1

== Medalists ==
=== Summer medallists with minimum 2 gold ===
Athlete	Sport	Years	Gender	Gold	Silver	Bronze	Total
Nadia Comăneci	Gymnastics	1976–1980	F	5	3	1	9
Elisabeta Lipă	Rowing	1984–2004	F	5	2	1	8
Georgeta Damian	Rowing	2000–2008	F	5	0	1	6
Ivan Patzaichin	Canoeing	1968–1984	M	4	3	0	7
Doina Ignat	Rowing	1992–2008	F	4	1	1	6
Ecaterina Szabo	Gymnastics	1984	F	4	1	0	5
Viorica Susanu	Rowing	2000–2008	F	4	0	1	5
Daniela Silivaș	Gymnastics	1988	F	3	2	1	6
Simona Amânar	Gymnastics	1996–2000	F	3	1	3	7
Constanța Burcică	Rowing	1992–2008	F	3	1	1	5
Elena Georgescu	Rowing	1992–2008	F	3	1	1	5
Cătălina Ponor	Gymnastics	2004–2012	F	3	1	1	5
Liliana Gafencu	Rowing	1996–2004	F	3	0	0	3
Veronica Cochela	Rowing	1988–2000	F	2	3	1	6
Lavinia Miloșovici	Gymnastics	1992–1996	F	2	1	3	6
Rodica Arba	Rowing	1980–1988	F	2	1	1	4
Olga Homeghi	Rowing	1980–1988	F	2	1	1	4
Toma Simionov	Canoeing	1980–1984	M	2	1	0	3
Ioana Olteanu	Rowing	1992–2000	F	2	1	0	3
Ancuța Bodnar	Rowing	2020–	F	2	1	0	3
Simona Radiș	Rowing	2020–	F	2	1	0	3
Sandra Izbașa	Gymnastics	2008–2012	F	2	0	2	4
Leon Rotman	Canoeing	1956–1960	M	2	0	1	3
Simona Păucă	Gymnastics	1984	F	2	0	1	3
Iolanda Balaș	Athletics	1960–1964	F	2	0	0	2
Marioara Popescu	Rowing	1984–1996	F	2	0	0	2
Diana Mocanu	Swimming	2000	F	2	0	0	2
Angela Alupei	Rowing	2000–2004	F	2	0	0	2
Monica Roșu	Gymnastics	2004	F	2	0	0	2

=== Winter medallists ===
Athlete	Sport	Years	Gender	Gold	Silver	Bronze	Total
Ion Panțuru	Bobsleigh	1968	M	0	0	1	1
Nicolae Neagoe	Bobsleigh	1968	M	0	0	1	1

== Summary by sport ==
=== Shooting ===
Romania's only appearance before 1924 was a single shooter at the 1900 Games, when Gheorghe Plagino placed 13th in the trap.

Games	Shooters	Events	Gold	Silver	Bronze	Total
1900 Paris	1	1/9	0	0	0	0
Total			6	4	5	15

== See also ==
- List of flag bearers for Romania at the Olympics
- Category:Olympic competitors for Romania
- Romania at the Paralympics
- Sport in Romania
