= Romanian Yachting Federation =

Sports governing body in Romania

Romanian Yachting Federation RYF
- IOC nation: Romania (ROM)
- Sport: Sailing
- Official website: www.fry.ro

History
- Year of formation: 1921

Demographics
- Number of affiliated Sailing clubs: Approx. 20

Affiliations
- International federation: International Sailing Federation (ISAF)
- Continental association: EUROSAF
- National Olympic Committee: Romanian Olympic and Sports Committee

Elected
- President: Mihai Butucaru

Secretariat
- Address: Bucharest
- Secretary General: Dan Mitici

Finance
- Company status: Association

The Romanian Yachting Federation is the national governing body for the sport of sailing in Romanian, recognised by the International Sailing Federation.
