= Dragoș Staicu =

Romanian alpine skier (born 1985)

Dragoş Staicu (born 12 October 1985) is an alpine skier from Romania. He competed for Romania at the 2010 Winter Olympics.
