= Ion Creangă, Neamț =

Ion Creangă
- Commune
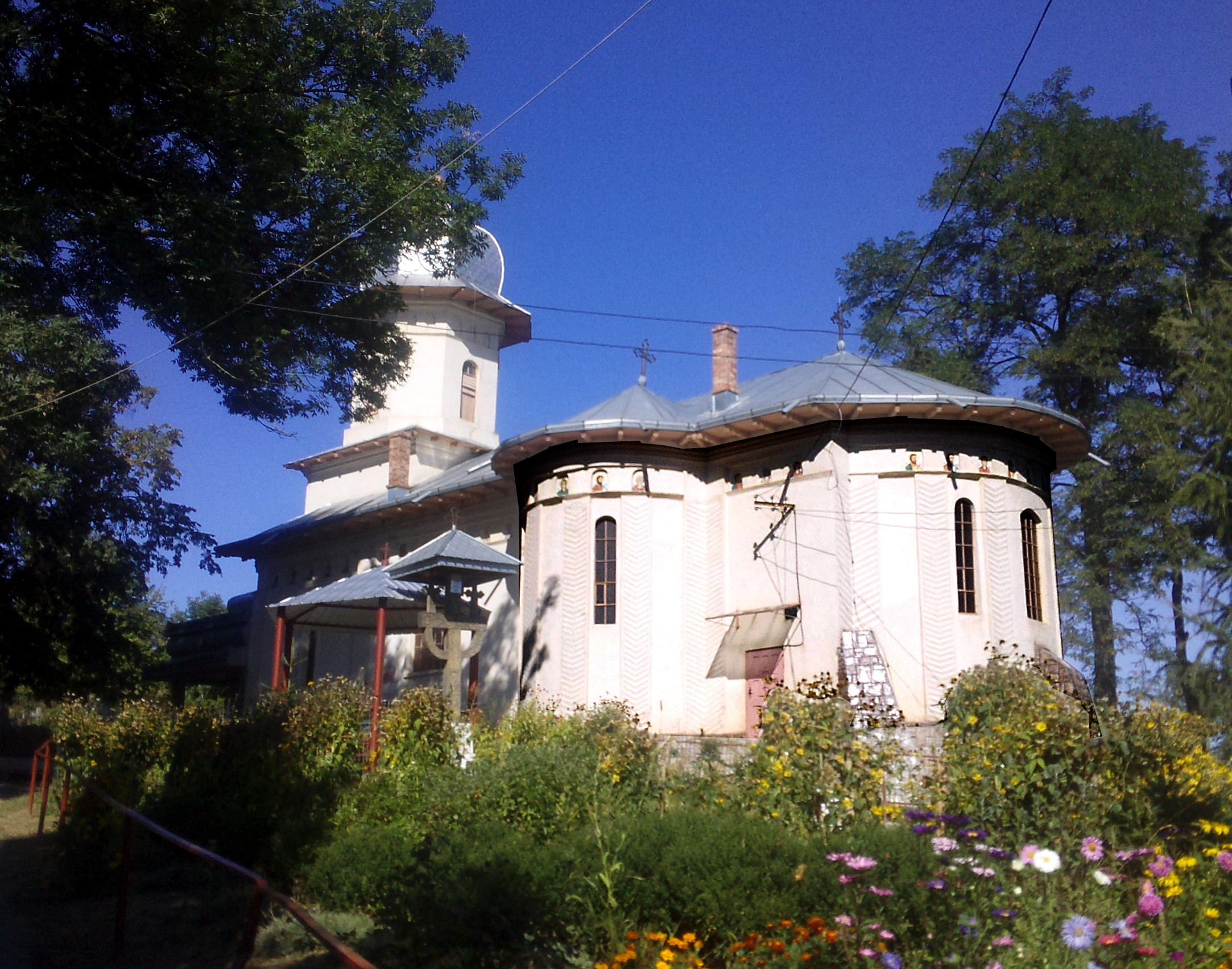
- Church in Ion Creangă

- Location in Neamț County

- Location in Romania
- Coordinates: 46.8564°N 26.9829°E
- Country: Romania
- County: Neamț

Government
  - Mayor (2024–2028): Dumitru-Dorin Tabacariu (PSD)
- Area: 74.91 km^{2} (28.92 sq mi)
- Elevation: 198 m (650 ft)
- Population (2021-12-01): 4,989
  - Density: 66.60/km^{2} (172.5/sq mi)
- Time zone: UTC+02:00 (EET)
  - Summer (DST): UTC+03:00 (EEST)
- Postal code: 617260
- Area code: +(40) 233
- Vehicle reg.: NT
- Website: www.primariaioncreanga.ro

Ion Creangă is a commune in Neamț County, Western Moldavia, Romania. It was named after the Romanian writer Ion Creangă. The commune is composed of six villages: Averești, Ion Creangă (Brătești until 1908 and then Brăteanu until the advent of the Communist regime in 1948), Izvoru, Muncelu, Recea, and Stejaru.

Historical population
Year	Pop.	±%
1992	5,827	—
2002	5,685	−2.4%
2011	5,001	−12.0%
2021	4,989	−0.2%
Source: Census data

== Natives ==
- Costel Petrariu (born 1958), bobsledder
