= Beatrice Huștiu =

Romanian figure skater

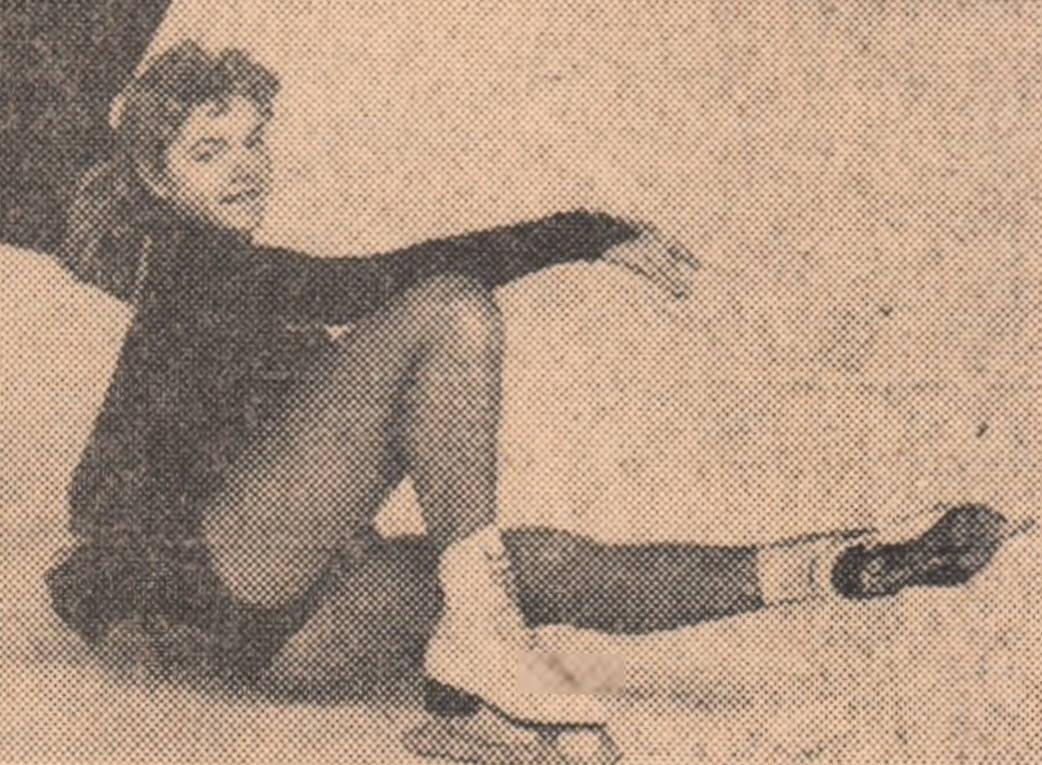
- Huștiu in 1973

Personal information
- Born: 2 September 1956 (age 69) Bucharest, Romania

Figure skating career
- Country: Romania
- Retired: 1976

Beatrice Huștiu (born 2 September 1956) is a Romanian former competitive figure skater. She competed at the 1968 Winter Olympics and served as her country's flag bearer at the event.

== Life and career ==
Huștiu was born on 2 September 1956 in Bucharest, Romania. She suffered from rickets in childhood and began skating when she was five years old. At the age of 11 years and 158 days, she competed at the 1968 Winter Olympics in Grenoble, France. She served as Romania's flag bearer at the event. She trained six hours a day.

Huștiu placed 22nd at the 1970 European Championships in Leningrad and 17th at the 1971 European Championships in Zurich. Hustiu's mother died when she was 14 years old, and her father died four years later.

At 19, Huștiu retired from competition and enrolled at the West University of Timișoara, Faculty of Physical Education and Sport. She married Eugen Triebel from Sibiu. She moved to Vienna in 1996.

== Competitive highlights ==
International
Event	1967–68	1968–69	1969–70	1970–71
Winter Olympics	29th			
European Champ.			22nd	17th
Prague Skate				11th
