= Ion Cavași =

Romanian alpine skier (born 1953)

Personal information
- Nationality: Romanian
- Born: 5 November 1953 (age 71); Breaza, Romania

Sport
- Sport: Alpine skiing

Ion Cavași (born 5 November 1953) is a Romanian alpine skier. He competed in three events at the 1976 Winter Olympics.
