= Tita Rădulescu =

Romanian bobsledder

Tiţă Rădulescu
Personal information
- Full name: Constantin Rădulescu
- Nationality: Romanian
- Born: 18 December 1904 Sinaia, Austria-Hungary

Sport
- Sport: Bobsleigh

Tiţă Rădulescu (18 December 1904 - November 1983) was a Romanian bobsledder. He competed at the 1928 Winter Olympics and the 1936 Winter Olympics.
