= Gheorghe Maftei =

Romanian bobsledder (1939–2006)

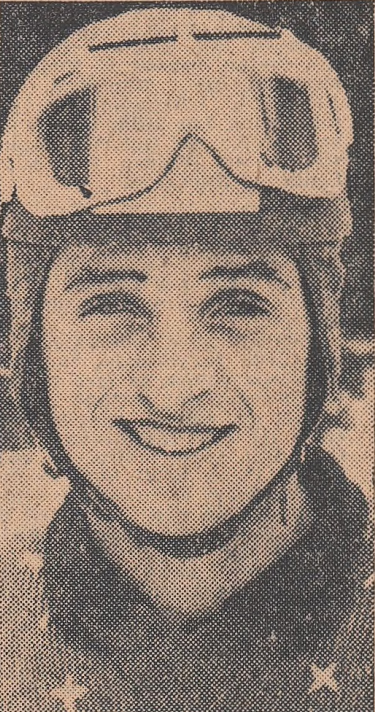
- Maftei in 1968

Personal information
- Nationality: Romanian
- Born: 7 April 1939 Mogoșești, Romania
- Died: January 2006 (aged 66)
- Height: 173 cm (5 ft 8 in)
- Weight: 73 kg (161 lb)

Sport
- Sport: Bobsleigh
Medal record
Men's bobsleigh
Representing Romania
European Championships
Gold medal – first place	1967 Igls	Four-man
Silver medal – second place	1968 St. Moritz	Four-man

Gheorghe Maftei (7 April 1939 – January 2006) was a Romanian bobsledder. He competed at the 1964 Winter Olympics and the 1968 Winter Olympics.

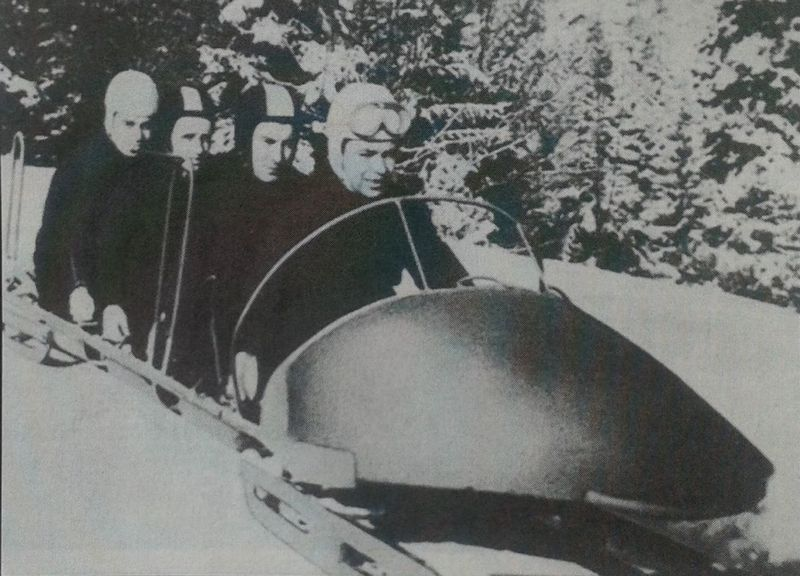
1967 four-person bobsled team (Ion Panțuru, Nicolae Neagoe, Petre Hristovici, Gheorghe Maftei)

Maftei died în January 2006, at the age of 66.
