= George Iordache =

Romanian bobsledder (born 2003)

Personal information
- Full name: Ionuț George Iordache
- Nationality: Romanian
- Born: 19 August 2003 (age 23) Curtea de Argeș, Romania
- Height: 185 cm (6 ft 1 in)
- Weight: 85 kg (187 lb)

Sport
- Country: Romania
- Sport: Bobsleigh
- Events: Two-man, Four-man
- Turned pro: 2022
Medal record
Men's bobsleigh
Representing Romania
Junior World Championships
Bronze medal – third place	2025 Altenberg	Two-man
Junior European Championships
Silver medal – second place	2023 Winterberg	Four-man

Ionuț George Iordache (born 19 August 2003) is a Romanian bobsledder. He was selected to represent Romania at the 2026 Winter Olympics.

== Career ==
Prior to bobsledding, Iordache was a track and field athlete in various disciplines, including hurdling and high jumping. He was recruited to bobsleigh by coach and former bobsledder Iulian Păcioianu, who noticed Iordache during a track and field practice. He was paired with pilot Mihai Tentea. The two have had success at both junior and World Cup levels. Tentea and Iordache earned a bronze medal at the two-man Junior World Championships in 2025. At the Bobsleigh World Championships, Tentea and Iordache finished 8th in two-man. Iordache has competed with Tentea at the World Cup level since 2023.

Iordache was selected to represent Romania in both two-man and four-man bobsled, with Tentea piloting in both. In the two-man, the pair finished 5th, the best performance for a Romanian bobsled team since 1972. In the four-man, he participated in the first three runs, but was replaced by Andrei Nica for the last run. The Romanian team finished 17th in the four-man.

== Bobsleigh results ==
All results are sourced from the International Bobsleigh and Skeleton Federation (IBSF).

=== Olympic Games ===
Event	Two-man	Four-man
(Italy) 2026 Milano Cortina	5th	17th

=== World Championships ===
Event	Two-man	Four-man
(Switzerland) 2023 St. Moritz	—	16th
(Germany) 2024 Winterberg	13th	DNS
(United States) 2025 Lake Placid	8th	17th
