= Nicolae Cristoloveanu =

Romanian biathlete (born 1950)

Personal information
- Nationality: Romanian
- Born: 22 April 1950; Brașov, Romania
- Died: April 14, 2010 (aged 59); Brașov, Romania

Sport
- Sport: Biathlon

Nicolae Cristoloveanu (born 22 April 1950) is a Romanian biathlete. He competed in the 20 km individual event at the 1976 Winter Olympics.
