= Gheorghe Voicu =

Romanian biathlete (born 1950)

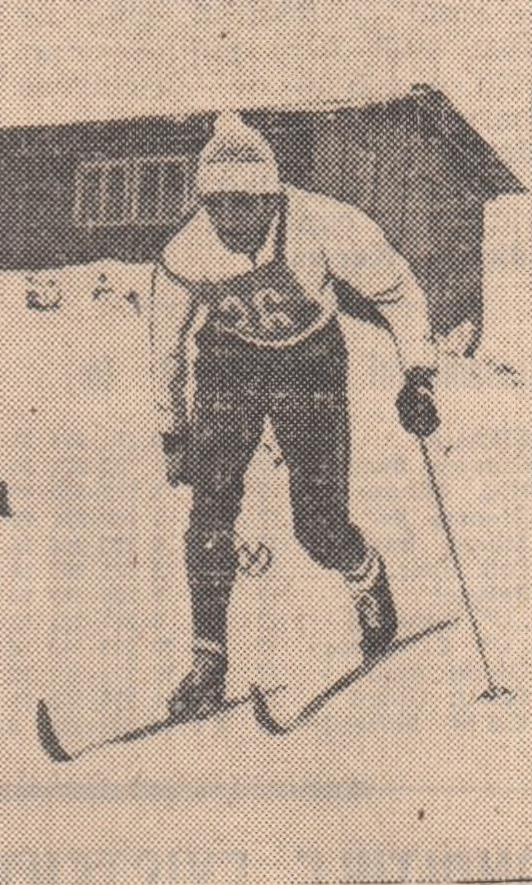
- Gheorghe Voicu in 1977

Personal information
- Nationality: Romanian
- Born: 5 September 1950 (age 75) Azuga, Romania

Sport
- Sport: Biathlon

Gheorghe Voicu (born 5 September 1950) is a Romanian biathlete. He competed in the 20 km individual event at the 1976 Winter Olympics.
