= Ion Cristian Stanciu =

Romanian luger (born 1973)

Personal information
- Nationality: Romanian
- Born: 29 December 1973 (age 51); Bucharest, Romania

Sport
- Sport: Luge

Ion Cristian Stanciu (born 29 December 1973) is a Romanian luger. He competed at the 1998 Winter Olympics and the 2002 Winter Olympics.
