= Costel Petrariu =

Romanian bobsledder

Personal information
- Nationality: Romanian
- Born: 16 July 1958 (age 67) Recea, Neamț County, Romania

Sport
- Sport: Bobsleigh

Costel Petrariu (born 16 July 1958) is a Romanian bobsledder. He competed at the 1984, 1988, and the 1992 Winter Olympics.
