= Ionuț Andrei =

Romanian bobsledder (born 1985)

Ionuț Andrei (born 20 December 1985) is a Romanian bobsledder who has competed since 2004. He finished 15th in the four-man event at the 2010 Winter Olympics in Vancouver.

At the FIBT World Championships, Andrei earned his best finish of 18th in the four-man event at Lake Placid, New York, in 2009.

He was born in Schitu Golești.
