= Costel Ionescu =

Romanian bobsledder

Personal information
- Nationality: Romanian
- Born: 2 April 1952 (age 72)

Sport
- Sport: Bobsleigh

Costel Ionescu (born 2 April 1952) is a Romanian bobsledder. He competed in the two man and the four man events at the 1976 Winter Olympics.
