= Mihai Nicolau =

Romanian bobsledder

Personal information
- Nationality: Romanian
- Born: 29 January 1949 (age 76)

Sport
- Sport: Bobsleigh

Mihai Nicolau (born 29 January 1949) is a Romanian bobsledder. He competed in the four man event at the 1976 Winter Olympics.
