= Carmen Tronescu =

Romanian bobsledder

Carmen Tronescu, born 12 May 1981) is a Romanian bobsledder who has competed since 2005. Her best World Cup finish was 16th in the two-woman event at St. Moritz, Switzerland in January 2009 and Igls, Austria in December 2011.

She competed in the two-woman event at the 2010 Winter Olympics, finishing 15th.
