= Csaba Nagy Lakatos =

Romanian bobsledder

Personal information
- Nationality: Romanian
- Born: 26 November 1962 (age 62); Miercurea Ciuc, Romania

Sport
- Sport: Bobsleigh

Csaba Nagy Lakatos (born 26 November 1962) is a Romanian bobsledder. He competed at the 1988 Winter Olympics and the 1992 Winter Olympics.
