= Florian Enache =

Romanian bobsledder

Personal information
- Nationality: Romanian
- Born: 9 April 1971 (age 53); Breaza, Romania

Sport
- Sport: Bobsleigh

Florian Enache (born 9 April 1971) is a Romanian bobsledder. He competed at the 1994, 1998 and the 2002 Winter Olympics.
