= Adrian Duminicel =

Romanian bobsledder

Personal information
- Nationality: Romanian
- Born: 30 September 1980 (age 44); Bucharest, Romania

Sport
- Sport: Bobsleigh

Adrian Duminicel (born 30 September 1980) is a Romanian bobsledder. He competed at the 2002 Winter Olympics and the 2006 Winter Olympics.
