= Alexe Gheorghe Tănăsescu =

Romanian bobsledder

Personal information
- Nationality: Romanian
- Born: 16 October 1949 (age 75)

Sport
- Sport: Bobsleigh

Alexe Gheorghe Tănăsescu (born 16 October 1949) is a Romanian bobsledder. He competed in the four man event at the 1976 Winter Olympics.
