= Gheorghe Gârniță =

Romanian biathlete (born 1950)

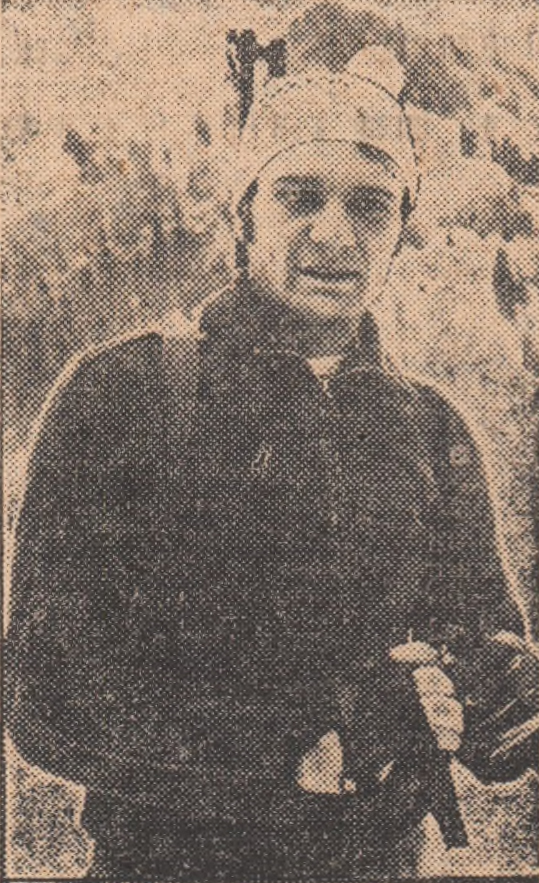
- Gheorghe Gârniță in 1974

Personal information
- Nationality: Romanian
- Born: 11 November 1950 (age 75) Brașov, Romania

Sport
- Sport: Biathlon

Gheorghe Gârniță (born 11 November 1950) is a Romanian biathlete. He competed in the 20 km individual event at the 1976 Winter Olympics.
