= Grigore Anghel =

Romanian bobsledder

Personal information
- Nationality: Romanian
- Born: 7 May 1960 (age 65)

Sport
- Sport: Bobsleigh

Grigore Anghel (born 7 May 1960) is a Romanian bobsledder. He competed in the two man and the four man events at the 1988 Winter Olympics.
