= Gabriel Tătaru =

Romanian bobsledder

Personal information
- Nationality: Romanian
- Born: 14 July 1977 (age 47); Pitești, Romania

Sport
- Sport: Bobsleigh

Gabriel Tătaru (born 14 July 1977) is a Romanian bobsledder. He competed in the two man event at the 1998 Winter Olympics.
