= Dragoș Panaitescu-Rapan =

Romanian bobsledder

- The 1972 Olympic Bobsled team

Personal information
- Nationality: Romanian
- Born: 3 September 1944 (age 82) Budapest, Hungary

Sport
- Sport: Bobsleigh

Dragoș Panaitescu-Rapan (born 3 September 1944) is a Romanian bobsledder. He competed at the 1972, 1976 and the 1980 Winter Olympics.
