= Marian Chițescu =

Romanian bobsledder

Personal information
- Nationality: Romanian
- Born: 20 May 1971 (age 54); Bușteni, Romania

Sport
- Sport: Bobsleigh

Marian Chițescu (born 20 May 1971) is a Romanian bobsledder. He competed at the 1994 Winter Olympics and the 1998 Winter Olympics.
