= Florian Olteanu =

Romanian bobsledder

Florin Olteanu
Personal information
- Full name: Florin Olteanu
- Nationality: Romanian
- Born: 5 April 1964 (age 62) Busteni, Romania

Sport
- Sport: Bobsleigh

Florin Olteanu (born 5 April 1964) is a Romanian bobsledder. He competed in the four man event at the Calgary 1988 Winter Olympics.
