= Gabriel Popa (bobsleigh) =

Romanian bobsledder

Personal information
- Nationality: Romanian
- Born: 4 March 1977 (age 48); Bucharest, Romania

Sport
- Sport: Bobsleigh

Gabriel Popa (born 4 March 1977) is a Romanian bobsledder. He competed in the four man event at the 2006 Winter Olympics.
