= Alexandru Ionescu (bobsledder) =

Romanian bobsledder

Alexandru Ionescu (born 10 March 1903; date of death unknown) was a Romanian bobsledder who competed in the 1930s. He was born in Bucharest.

Competing in two Winter Olympics, he earned his best finish of sixth in the four-man event at Lake Placid, United States in 1932.

Four years later at the 1936 Winter Olympics he was again a member of the Romanian bobsled team, but they did not finish in the four-man competition.
