= Mihai Iliescu =

Romanian bobsledder

Aurel Mihai Iliescu (born 25 July 1978 in Slănic, Prahova) is a Romanian bobsledder who competed from 1998 to 2006. He finished 26th in the two-man event at the 2006 Winter Olympics in Turin.

At the FIBT World Championships, Iliescu earned his best finish of 21st in the four-man event at Calgary in 2005.

Iliescu retired after the 2006 games.
