= Constantin Romaniuc =

Romanian bobsledder (born 1953)

Personal information
- Nationality: Romanian
- Born: 10 April 1953 (age 73)

Sport
- Sport: Bobsleigh

Achievements and titles
- Olympic finals: 1976 Winter Olympics

Constantin Romaniuc (born 10 April 1953) is a Romanian bobsledder. He competed in the four man event at the 1976 Winter Olympics.
