= Gheorghe Lixandru =

Romanian bobsledder

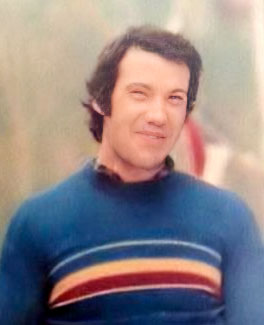

Personal information
- Nationality: Romanian
- Born: 26 March 1953 (age 72) Bucharest, Romania

Sport
- Sport: Bobsleigh

Gheorghe Lixandru (born 26 March 1953) is a Romanian bobsledder. He competed at the 1976, 1980 and the 1984 Winter Olympics. Lixandru was the flag bearer for Romania in the opening ceremony of the 1980 Winter Olympics.
