= Alina Vera Savin =

Romanian bobsledder (born 1988)

Alina Vera Savin (born 1 March 1988 in Bușteni) is a Romanian bobsledder who has competed since 2007. She finished 15th in the two-woman event at the 2010 Winter Olympics in Vancouver.

Savin's best World Cup finish is 19th in the two-woman event at St. Moritz in January 2010.
