= Mihai Dumitrașcu =

Romanian bobsledder

Personal information
- Nationality: Romanian
- Born: 3 January 1970 (age 56) Ploiești, Romania

Sport
- Sport: Bobsleigh

Mihai Dumitrașcu (born 3 January 1970) is a Romanian bobsledder. He competed at the 1994 Winter Olympics and the 1998 Winter Olympics.
