= Mihai Tentea =

Romanian bobsledder (born 1998)

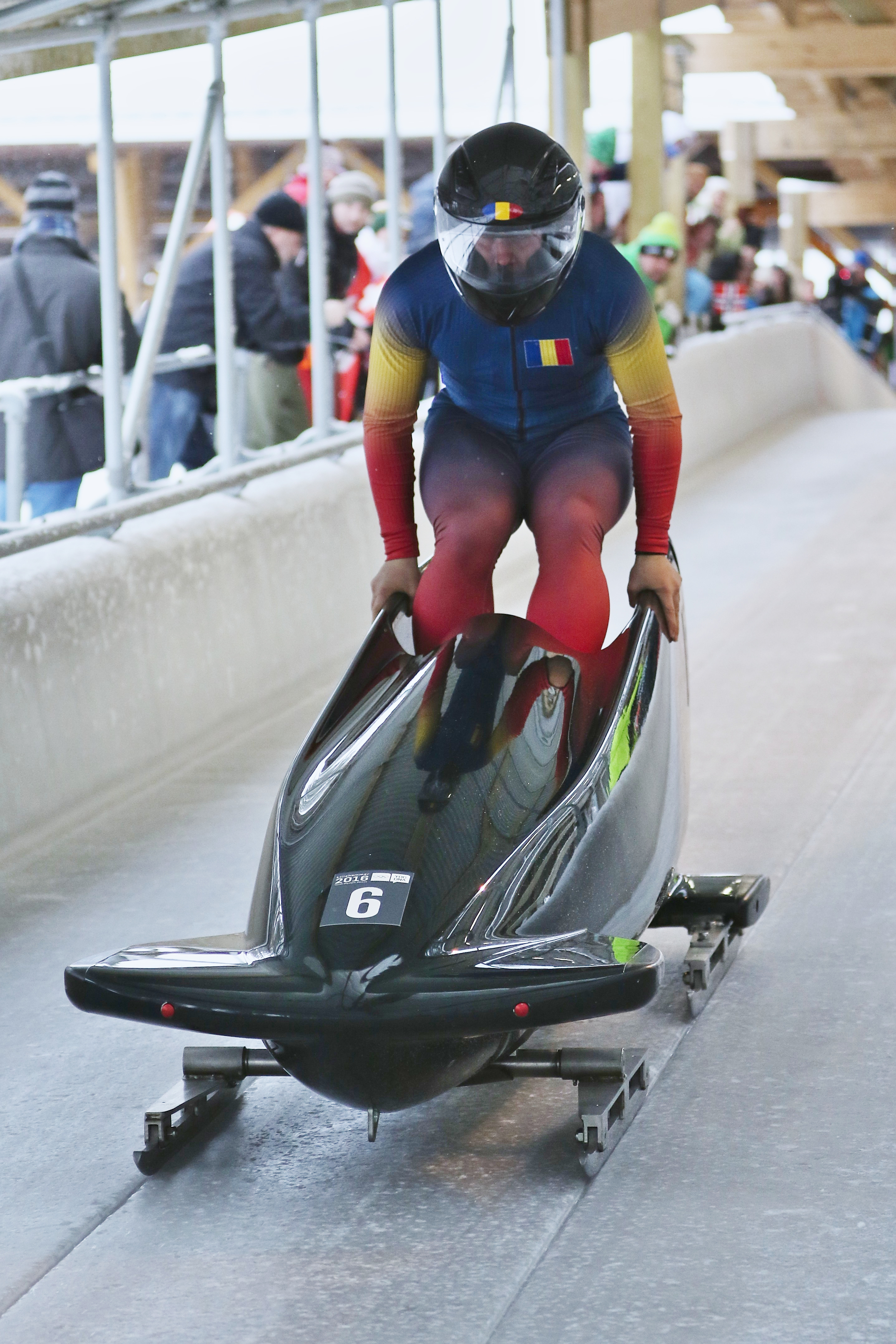
- Tentea at the 2016 Winter Youth Olympics

Personal information
- Full name: Mihai Cristian Tentea
- Born: 30 December 1998 (age 27) Pitești, Romania

Sport
- Sport: Bobsleigh
Medal record
IBSF Junior World Championships
Silver medal – second place	2018 St. Moritz	Two-man (U23)
Gold medal – first place	2021 St. Moritz	Two-man (U23)
Bronze medal – third place	2021 St. Moritz	Two-man (Junior)

Mihai Cristian Tentea (born 30 December 1998) is a Romanian bobsledder. He competed in the two-man event at the 2018, 2022 and 2026 Winter Olympics.

== Career ==
He was the youngest athlete in competition in 2018.

At the two-man event at the 2026 Winter Olympics, Tentea with his teammate George Iordache finished in fifth place. This was Romania's best result in any Winter Olympics event since 1992.
