= Iulian Păcioianu =

Romanian bobsledder

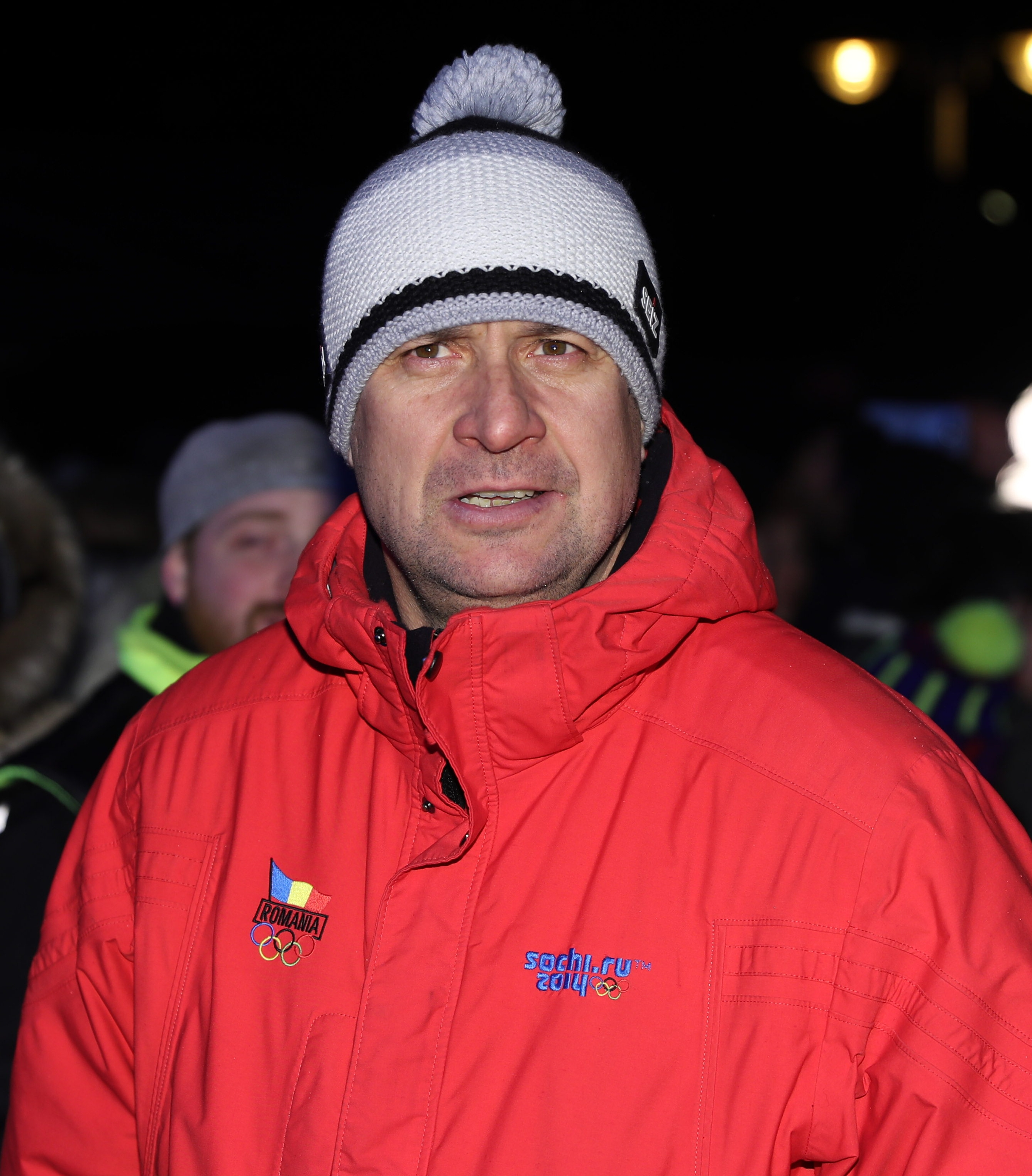
- Păcioianu at IBSF World Championships 2020

Personal information
- Nationality: Romanian
- Born: 25 August 1970 (age 54); Pitești, Romania

Sport
- Sport: Bobsleigh

Iulian Păcioianu (born 25 August 1970) is a Romanian bobsledder. He competed at the 1994, 1998 and the 2002 Winter Olympics.
