= Dorin Degan =

Romanian bobsledder

Personal information
- Nationality: Romanian
- Born: 11 July 1959 (age 67) Brașov, Romania

Sport
- Sport: Bobsleigh

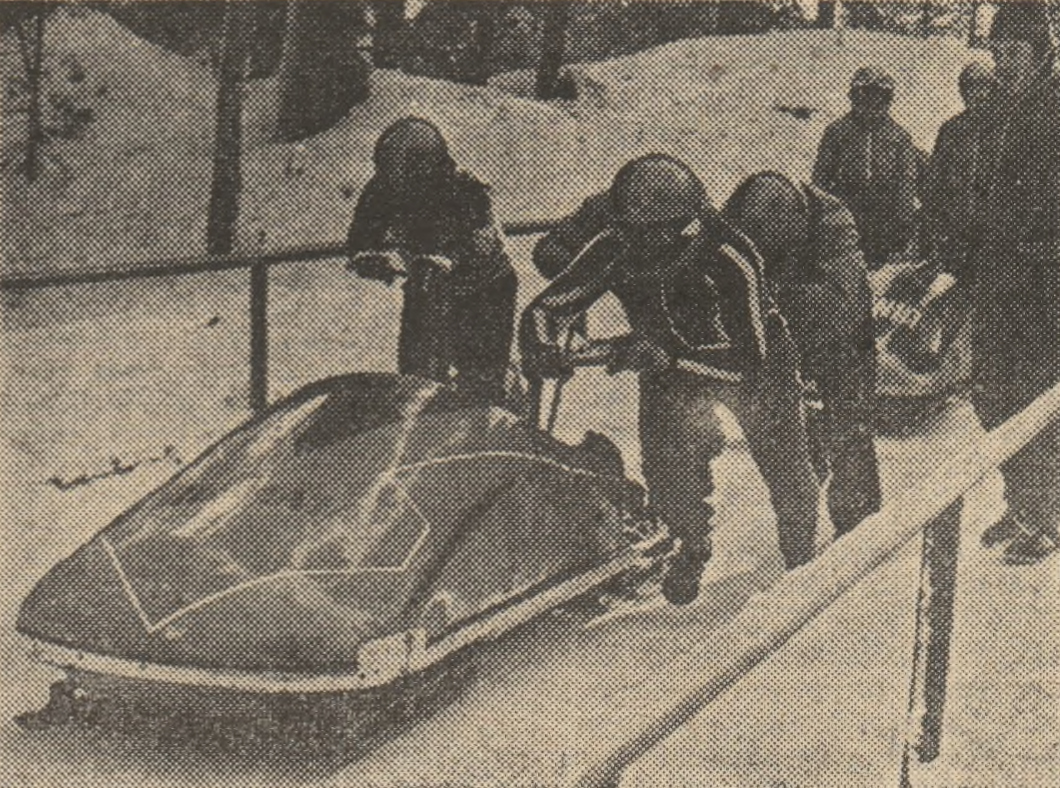
The 4-man bobsleigh crew at the Sarajevo Olympics, pilot Dorin Degan, Cornel Popescu, Gheorghe Lixandru, Costel Petrariu

Dorin Degan (born 11 July 1959) is a Romanian bobsledder. He competed at the 1984 Winter Olympics and the 1988 Winter Olympics.
