= Ioan Dănuț Dovalciuc =

Romanian bobsledder

Ioan Dănuț Dovalciuc (born June 20, 1984) is a Romanian bobsledder from Suceava who has competed since 2005. Competing in two Winter Olympics, he earned his best finish of 15th in the four-man event at Vancouver in 2010.

At the FIBT World Championships, Dovalciuc earned his best finish of 11th in the two-man event at St. Moritz in 2007.
