= Éva Tófalvi =

Romanian biathlete (born 1978)

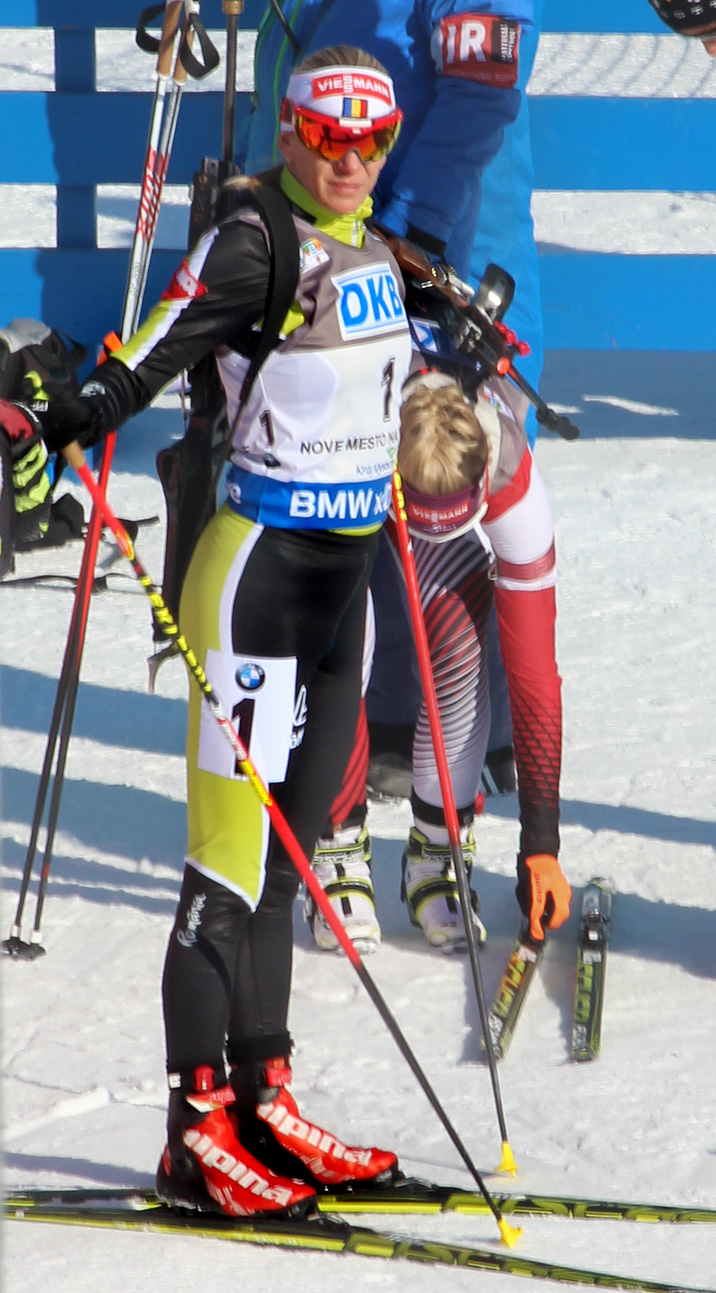

Personal information
- Born: 4 December 1978 (age 47) Miercurea Ciuc, Romania
- Height: 1.72 m (5 ft 8 in)

Sport
- Sport: Skiing
- Club: A.S.A. Miercurea Ciuc

World Cup career
- Seasons: 1995–2017
- Indiv. wins: 1

Éva Tófalvi (born 4 December 1978) is a Romanian retired biathlete of Hungarian ethnicity.

== Career ==
She finished in 11th place in the Women's Overall World Cup standings and in 2nd place in the Individual event at the end of the 2008-09 Biathlon World Cup. During this season she also won her first ever World Cup event in Hochfilzen, Austria, in the 15 km Individual race, she originally finished second, but winner Albina Akhatova was later disqualified due to use of doping. Tofalvi's victory is also the first ever race won by a Romanian athlete in the biathlon World Cup.

== Results ==
Results in top 30 are included.

Event	Discipline	Pos	Date	Season
2011-12 Biathlon World Cup Holmenkollen	Mass start	28	05/02/2012	2011/2012
2011-12 Biathlon World Cup Nové Město na Moravě	Pursuit	23	15/01/2012	2011/2012
2011-12 Biathlon World Cup Nové Město na Moravě	Sprint	21	13/01/2012	2011/2012
2011-12 Biathlon World Cup Nové Město na Moravě	Individual	11	11/01/2012	2011/2012
2011-12 Biathlon World Cup Hochfilzen	Pursuit	13	10/12/2011	2011/2012
2011-12 Biathlon World Cup Hochfilzen	Sprint	26	09/12/2011	2011/2012
2011-12 Biathlon World Cup Östersund	Pursuit	20	04/12/2011	2011/2012
2011-12 Biathlon World Cup Östersund	Sprint	17	02/12/2011	2011/2012
Biathlon World Championships 2011 Khanty-Mansiysk	Mass start	20	12/03/2011	2010/2011
Biathlon World Championships 2011 Khanty-Mansiysk	Pursuit	28	06/03/2011	2010/2011
Biathlon World Championships 2011 Khanty-Mansiysk	Sprint	15	05/03/2011	2010/2011
2010-11 Biathlon World Cup Fort Kent, Maine	Pursuit	26	12/02/2011	2010/2011
2010-11 Biathlon World Cup Ruhpolding	Pursuit	17	16/01/2011	2010/2011
2010-11 Biathlon World Cup Ruhpolding	Sprint	15	15/01/2011	2010/2011
2010-11 Biathlon World Cup Ruhpolding	Individual	21	13/01/2011	2010/2011
2010-11 Biathlon World Cup Oberhof	Sprint	29	08/01/2011	2010/2011
2010-11 Biathlon World Cup Pokljuka	Individual	17	16/12/2010	2010/2011
2009-10 Biathlon World Cup Oslo	Pursuit	16	20/03/2010	2009/2010
2009-10 Biathlon World Cup Oslo	Sprint	15	18/03/2010	2009/2010
2010 Winter Olympic Vancouver	Mass start	24	21/02/2010	2009/2010
2010 Winter Olympic Vancouver	Individual	11	18/02/2010	2009/2010
2010 Winter Olympic Vancouver	Pursuit	14	16/02/2010	2009/2010
2010 Winter Olympic Vancouver	Sprint	13	13/02/2010	2009/2010
2009-10 Biathlon World Cup Antholz	Individual	20	20/01/2010	2009/2010
2009-10 Biathlon World Cup Pokljuka	Pursuit	25	20/12/2009	2009/2010
2009-10 Biathlon World Cup Pokljuka	Sprint	25	19/12/2009	2009/2010
2008-09 Biathlon World Cup Khanty-Mansiysk	Mass start	25	29/03/2009	2008/2009
2008-09 Biathlon World Cup Khanty-Mansiysk	Pursuit	28	28/03/2009	2008/2009
2008-09 Biathlon World Cup Khanty-Mansiysk	Sprint	12	27/03/2009	2008/2009
2008-09 Biathlon World Cup Trondheim	Mass start	18	22/03/2009	2008/2009
2008-09 Biathlon World Cup Trondheim	Pursuit	9	21/03/2009	2008/2009
2008-09 Biathlon World Cup Trondheim	Sprint	19	19/03/2009	2008/2009
2008-09 Biathlon World Cup Vancouver	Sprint	7	13/03/2009	2008/2009
2008-09 Biathlon World Cup Vancouver	Individual	14	11/03/2009	2008/2009
Biathlon World Championships 2009 Pyeongchang	Mass start	14	22/02/2009	2008/2009
Biathlon World Championships 2009 Pyeongchang	Individual	7	18/02/2009	2008/2009
Biathlon World Championships 2009 Pyeongchang	Pursuit	21	15/02/2009	2008/2009
Biathlon World Championships 2009 Pyeongchang	Sprint	20	14/02/2009	2008/2009
2008-09 Biathlon World Cup Antholz-Anterselva	Mass start	15	25/01/2009	2008/2009
2008-09 Biathlon World Cup Antholz-Anterselva	Pursuit	21	24/01/2009	2008/2009
2008-09 Biathlon World Cup Antholz-Anterselva	Sprint	30	22/01/2009	2008/2009
2008-09 Biathlon World Cup Ruhpolding	Pursuit	11	18/01/2009	2008/2009
2008-09 Biathlon World Cup Ruhpolding	Sprint	28	16/01/2009	2008/2009
2008-09 Biathlon World Cup Oberhof	Mass start	16	11/01/2009	2008/2009
2008-09 Biathlon World Cup Oberhof	Sprint	9	10/01/2009	2008/2009
2008-09 Biathlon World Cup Hochfilzen	Sprint	9	20/12/2008	2008/2009
2008-09 Biathlon World Cup Hochfilzen	Individual	1	18/12/2008	2008/2009
2008-09 Biathlon World Cup Hochfilzen	Sprint	11	12/12/2008	2008/2009
2008-09 Biathlon World Cup Östersund	Pursuit	6	07/12/2008	2008/2009
2008-09 Biathlon World Cup Östersund	Sprint	9	06/12/2008	2008/2009
2007-08 Biathlon World Cup Holmenkollen	Pursuit	25	15/03/2008	2007/2008
2007-08 Biathlon World Cup Holmenkollen	Sprint	30	13/03/2008	2007/2008
2007-08 Biathlon World Cup Pyeongchang	Pursuit	13	01/03/2008	2007/2008
2007-08 Biathlon World Cup Pyeongchang	Sprint	15	28/02/2008	2007/2008
Biathlon World Championships 2008 Östersund	Pursuit	18	10/02/2008	2007/2008
2007-08 Biathlon World Cup Antholz-Anterselva	Pursuit	8	19/01/2008	2007/2008
2007-08 Biathlon World Cup Antholz-Anterselva	Sprint	26	17/01/2008	2007/2008
2007-08 Biathlon World Cup Ruhpolding	Pursuit	22	13/01/2008	2007/2008
2007-08 Biathlon World Cup Ruhpolding	Sprint	28	11/01/2008	2007/2008
2007-08 Biathlon World Cup Kontiolahti	Individual	25	29/11/2007	2007/2008
2006-07 Biathlon World Cup Oslo-Holmenkollen	Pursuit	18	10/03/2007	2006/2007
2006-07 Biathlon World Cup Oslo-Holmenkollen	Sprint	15	08/03/2007	2006/2007
2006-07 Biathlon World Cup Pokljuka	Pursuit	19	19/01/2007	2006/2007
2006-07 Biathlon World Cup Pokljuka	Sprint	24	17/01/2007	2006/2007
2006-07 Biathlon World Cup Hochfilzen	Pursuit	28	09/12/2006	2006/2007
2006-07 Biathlon World Cup Hochfilzen	Sprint	25	08/12/2006	2006/2007
2005-06 Biathlon World Cup Oslo-Holmenkollen	Sprint	24	23/03/2006	2005/2006
2005-06 Biathlon World Cup Pokljuka	Pursuit	20	11/03/2006	2005/2006
2005-06 Biathlon World Cup Pokljuka	Sprint	29	09/03/2006	2005/2006
2006 Winter Olympic Turin	Individual	19	13/02/2006	2005/2006
Biathlon World Championships 2005 Hochfilzen	Pursuit	16	06/03/2005	2004/2005
Biathlon World Championships 2005 Hochfilzen	Sprint	30	05/03/2005	2004/2005
2004–05 Biathlon World Cup Pokljuka	Mass start	29	20/02/2005	2004/2005
2004–05 Biathlon World Cup Pokljuka	Sprint	13	17/02/2005	2004/2005
2004–05 Biathlon World Cup Antholz-Anterselva	Individual	25	20/01/2005	2004/2005
2004–05 Biathlon World Cup Östersund	Mass start	21	19/12/2004	2004/2005
2004–05 Biathlon World Cup Östersund	Pursuit	18	18/12/2004	2004/2005
2004–05 Biathlon World Cup Östersund	Sprint	24	16/12/2004	2004/2005
2004–05 Biathlon World Cup Oslo-Holmenkollen	Pursuit	30	12/12/2004	2004/2005
2004–05 Biathlon World Cup Oslo-Holmenkollen	Sprint	21	11/12/2004	2004/2005
2004–05 Biathlon World Cup Oslo-Holmenkollen	Individual	12	09/12/2004	2004/2005
Biathlon World Championships 2004 Oberhof	Pursuit	23	08/02/2004	2003/2004
2003-04 Biathlon World Cup Brezno-Osrblie	Pursuit	21	21/12/2003	2003/2004
2003-04 Biathlon World Cup Brezno-Osrblie	Sprint	20	20/12/2003	2003/2004
2003-04 Biathlon World Cup Hochfilzen	Sprint	24	11/12/2003	2003/2004
Biathlon World Championships 2003 Khanty-Mansiysk	Individual	28	2003	2002/2003
2002-03 Biathlon World Cup Östersund	Pursuit	22	2003	2002/2003
2002-03 Biathlon World Cup Östersund	Individual	15	2003	2002/2003
2001-02 Biathlon World Cup Antholz-Anterselva	Pursuit	24	2002	2001/2002
2001-02 Biathlon World Cup Brezno-Osrblie	Sprint	17	2001	2001/2002
2001-02 Biathlon World Cup Pokljuka	Pursuit	26	2001	2001/2002
Biathlon World Championships 2001 Pokljuka	Pursuit	26	2001	2000/2001
Biathlon World Championships 2001 Pokljuka	Individual	6	2001	2000/2001
Biathlon World Championships 2001 Pokljuka	Mass start	10	2001	2000/2001
2000-01 Biathlon World Cup Ruhpolding	Pursuit	18	2001	2000/2001
2000-01 Biathlon World Cup Ruhpolding	Sprint	15	2001	2000/2001
2000-01 Biathlon World Cup Brezno-Osrblie	Pursuit	19	2000	2000/2001
2000-01 Biathlon World Cup Brezno-Osrblie	Individual	27	2000	2000/2001
1999-2000 Biathlon World Cup Lahti	Individual	28	2000	1999/2000
1999-2000 Biathlon World Cup Lahti	Pursuit	16	2000	1999/2000
Biathlon World Championships 2000 Oslo-Holmenkollen	Pursuit	18	2000	1999/2000
1999-2000 Biathlon World Cup Ruhpolding	Pursuit	26	2000	1999/2000
1999-2000 Biathlon World Cup Brezno-Osrblie	Sprint	14	1999	1999/2000
1999-2000 Biathlon World Cup Brezno-Osrblie	Individual	17	1999	1999/2000
Biathlon World Championships 1999 Oslo-Holmenkollen	Individual	12	1999	1998/1999
1998-99 Biathlon World Cup Oslo-Holmenkollen	Pursuit	28	1999	1998/1999
1998-99 Biathlon World Cup Val Cartier	Pursuit	26	1999	1998/1999
1998-99 Biathlon World Cup Val Cartier	Sprint	9	1999	1998/1999
1998-99 Biathlon World Cup Ruhpolding	Pursuit	27	1999	1998/1999
1998-99 Biathlon World Cup Brezno-Osrblie	Individual	25	1998	1998/1999
1998 Winter Olympic Nagano	Individual	11	09/02/1998	1997/1998
1997-98 Biathlon World Cup Östersund	Individual	29	1997	1997/1998

== Notes and references ==
Olympic Games
Preceded by Gheorghe Chiper	Flagbearer for Romania; Vancouver 2010; Sochi 2014	Succeeded by Marius Ungureanu
