= Nicolae Istrate =

Romanian bobsledder

Personal information
- Born: 24 October 1982 (age 44) Câmpulung Moldovenesc, Suceava, Romania
- Height: 183 cm (6 ft 0 in)
- Weight: 88 kg (194 lb)

Sport
- Country: Romania
- Sport: Bobsled

Nicolae Istrate (born 24 October 1982 in Câmpulung Muscel

) is a Romanian bobsledder who has competed since 2000. Competing in three Winter Olympics, he earned his best finish of 11th in the two-man event at Vancouver in 2010.

At the FIBT World Championships, Istrate earned his best finish of 8th in the two-man event at Königssee in 2011. He used to be a decathlete for the Romanian Team. Istrate is married with Diana Dumitrescu who is an athlete as well.
