= Paul Pepene =

Romanian cross-country skier (born 1988)

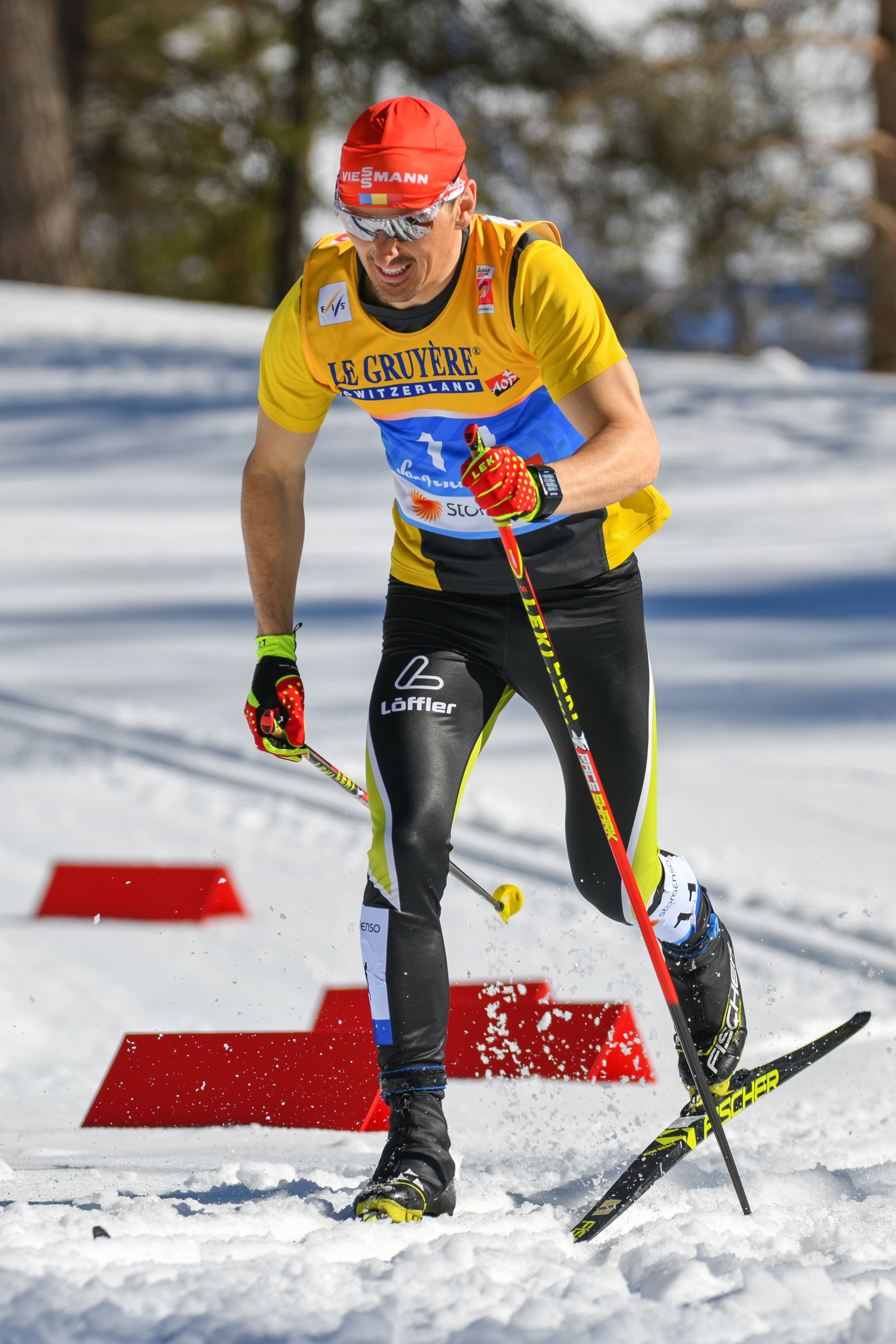
- Pepene in February 2019

Personal information
- Full name: Paul Constantin Pepene
- Nationality: Romania
- Born: 21 May 1988 (age 38) Brașov, Socialist Republic of Romania

Sport
- Sport: Skiing
- Club: CS Dinamo București

World Cup career
- Seasons: 11 – (2012–2022)
- Indiv. starts: 67
- Indiv. podiums: 0
- Team starts: 1
- Team podiums: 0
- Overall titles: 0 – (81st in 2016)
- Discipline titles: 0
Medal record
Men's cross-country skiing
Representing Romania
U23 World Championships
Gold medal – first place	2010 Hinterzarten	30 km skiathlon
- Updated on 26 February 2023

Paul Constantin Pepene (born 21 May 1988 in Brașov) is a Romanian cross-country skier. Pepene won the 30 km pursuit at the U-23 World Championships in January 2010, and competed in the 2009 World Ski Championships and at the 2010 Winter Olympics. At the 2010 Olympics, Pepene competed at three events, notably finishing 29th in the 30 km pursuit.

== Cross-country skiing results ==
All results are sourced from the International Ski Federation (FIS).

=== Olympic Games ===
Year	Age	15 km individual	30 km skiathlon	50 km mass start	Sprint	4 × 10 km relay	Team sprint
2010	21	37	29	DNS	—	—	17
2014	25	62	47	—	65	—	18
2018	29	37	24	32	—	—	18
2022	33	30	28	—^{[a]}	—	—	18

^{a} Distance reduced to 30 km due to weather conditions.

=== World Championships ===
Year	Age	15 km individual	30 km skiathlon	50 km mass start	Sprint	4 × 10 km relay	Team sprint
2009	20	64	55	—	79	—	—
2011	22	45	35	—	59	—	DNS
2013	24	56	41	—	68	—	18
2015	26	40	33	—	52	—	17
2017	28	—	41	29	52	14	—
2019	30	41	40	—	—	—	—
2021	32	36	49	—	68	—	—
2023	34	39	36	—	—	—	19

=== World Cup ===
==== Season standings ====
Season	Age	Discipline standings			Ski Tour standings				
Season	Age	Overall	Distance	Sprint	Nordic Opening	Tour de Ski	Ski Tour 2020	World Cup Final	Ski Tour Canada
2012	24	NC	NC	NC	92	—	—N/a	—	—N/a
2013	25	165	103	NC	—	—	—N/a	—	—N/a
2014	26	152	97	—	—	—	—N/a	—	—N/a
2015	27	NC	NC	—	—	—	—N/a	—N/a	—N/a
2016	28	81	47	NC	37	35	—N/a	—N/a	—
2017	29	101	66	NC	33	33	—N/a	—	—N/a
2018	30	127	84	NC	—	—	—N/a	—	—N/a
2019	31	NC	NC	NC	—	—	—N/a	—	—N/a
2020	32	100	72	NC	—	34	—	—N/a	—N/a
2021	33	NC	NC	NC	—	—	—N/a	—N/a	—N/a
2022	34	NC	NC	NC	—N/a	DNF	—N/a	—N/a	—N/a
