= Romanian Olympic and Sports Committee =

National Olympic Committee

- Country: Romania
- Code: ROU
- Created: 1914
- Recognized: 1914
- Continental Association: EOC
- Headquarters: Bucharest, Romania
- President: Mihai Covaliu
- Secretary General: George Boroi
- Website: www.cosr.ro

The Romanian Olympic and Sports Committee (Romanian: Comitetul Olimpic și Sportiv Român, COSR; IOC Code: ROU) is responsible for Romania's participation in the Olympic Games.

== History ==
Old logo

The Romanian Olympic Committee (Romanian: Comitetul Olimpic Român) was formed in 1914 in Bucharest. In 2004 it changed its name to Romanian Olympic and Sports Committee.

== Presidents ==
The following is a list of presidents of the Romanian Olympic and Sports Committee since its creation in 1914.

Nº	Name	Since	Until
1	Crown Prince Carol II	1914	1920
2	Prince George Valentin Bibescu	1920	1923
3	Crown Prince Carol II	1923	1930
4	King Carol II	1930	1940
vacant		1940	1947
5	Ion Gheorghe Maurer	1947	1951
6	Mihail Macavei	1951	1953
7	Alexandru Siperco	1953	1959
8	Manole Bodnăraș	1959	1960
9	Aurel Duma	1960	1966
10	Anghel Alexe	1966	1974
11	Gen. Marin Dragnea	1974	1984
12	Haralambie Alexa	1984	1987
13	Gen. Gheorghe Gomoiu	1987	June 1989
14	Gen. Constantin Oprita	June 1989	December 1989
14	Lia Manoliu	1990	1998
15	Ion Țiriac	1998	2004
17	Octavian Morariu	2004	2014
18	Alin Petrache	2014	2016
19	Mihai Covaliu	2016	present

== IOC Members ==
This is a list a IOC Members:

Member	Term
George Valentin Bibescu	1899–1902
Gheorghe Plagino	1908–1949
Alexandru Siperco	1955–1998
Octavian Morariu	2013–present

== Executive committee ==
The committee of the COSR is represented by:

- President: Mihai Covaliu
- Vice Presidents: Octavian Morariu, Camelia Potec, Alexandru Dedu
- Secretary General: George Boroi
- Treasurer: Vasile Luga
- Members: Irina Deleanu, Sandu Pop, Cristinel Romanescu, Adrian Stoica, Gheorghe Visan, Alina Dumitru, Doina Melinte, Georgeta Damian, Viorica Susanu, Puiu Gaspar, Alexandru Hălăucă, Valentin Amato Zaharia

== Member federations ==
The Romanian National Federations are the organizations that coordinate all aspects of their individual sports. They are responsible for training, competition and development of their sports. There are currently 28 Olympic Summer. and 4 Winter Sport Federations in Romania.

National Federation	Summer or Winter	Headquarters
Romanian Archery Federation	Summer	Bucharest
Romanian Athletics Federation	Summer	Bucharest
Romanian Badminton Federation	Summer	Bucharest
Romanian Basketball Federation	Summer	Bucharest
Romanian Bobsleigh and Luge Federation	Winter	Bucharest
Romanian Boxing Federation	Summer	Bucharest
Romanian Canoe Federation	Summer	Bucharest
Romanian Cycling Federation	Summer	Bucharest
Romanian Equestrian Federation	Summer	Bucharest
Romanian Fencing Federation	Summer	Bucharest
Romanian Field Hockey Federation	Summer	Bucharest
Romanian Football Federation	Summer	Bucharest
Romanian Golf Federation	Summer	Breaza
Romanian Gymnastics Federation	Summer	Bucharest
Romanian Handball Federation	Summer	Bucharest
Romanian Ice Hockey Federation	Winter	Bucharest
Romanian Judo Federation	Summer	Bucharest
Romanian Rowing Federation	Summer	Bucharest
Romanian Rugby Federation	Summer	Bucharest
Romanian Shooting Sport Federation	Summer	Bucharest
Romanian Skating Federation	Winter	Bucharest
Romanian Ski Biathlon Federation	Winter	Bucharest
Romanian Swimming and Modern Pentathlon Federation	Summer	Bucharest
Romanian Table Tennis Federation	Summer	Bucharest
Romanian Taekwondo Federation	Summer	Bucharest
Romanian Tennis Federation	Summer	Bucharest
Romanian Triathlon Federation	Summer	Bucharest
Romanian Volleyball Federation	Summer	Bucharest
Romanian Water Polo Federation	Summer	Bucharest
Romanian Weightlifting Federation	Summer	Bucharest
Romanian Wrestling Federation	Summer	Bucharest
Romanian Yachting Federation	Summer	Bucharest

== See also ==
- Romania at the Olympics
