= List of Olympic men's ice hockey players for Romania =

Men's ice hockey tournaments have been staged at the Olympic Games since 1920. The men's tournament was introduced at the 1920 Summer Olympics, and permanently added to the Winter Olympic Games in 1924. Romania has participated in four tournaments: 1964, 1968, 1976, and 1980. A total of 7 goaltenders and 45 skaters have represented Romania at the Olympics.

Doru Tureanu has scored the most goals, 11, and points, 19, while Eduard Pană has the most assists, 10. Pană and Dezső Varga competed in the most Olympics, three, while Varga has played the most games, 18. Pană and Tureanu are the only two Romanian players to have been inducted into the IIHF Hall of Fame, in 1998 and 2011, respectively.

== Key ==
General terms
Term	Definition
GP	Games played
IIHFHOF	International Ice Hockey Federation Hall of Fame
Olympics	Number of Olympic Games tournaments
Ref(s)	Reference(s)

Goaltender statistical abbreviations
Abbreviation	Definition
W	Wins
L	Losses
T	Ties
Min	Minutes played
SO	Shutouts
GA	Goals against
GAA	Goals against average

Skater statistical abbreviations
Abbreviation	Definition
G	Goals
A	Assists
P	Points
PIM	Penalty minutes

== Goaltenders ==
Goaltenders
Player	Olympics	Tournament(s)	GP	W	L	T	Min	SO	GA	GAA	Notes	Ref(s)
Anton Crișan	1	1964	–	–	–	–	–	–	–	–		
Constantin Dumitras	1	1968	–	–	–	–	–	–	–	–		
Gheorghe Huțan	1	1980	–	–	–	–	–	–	–	–		
Vasile Morar	1	1976	–	–	–	–	–	–	–	–		
Valerian Netedu	2	1976, 1980	–	–	–	–	–	–	–	–		
Iosef Sofian	1	1964	–	–	–	–	–	–	–	–		
Mihai Stoiculescu	1	1968	–	–	–	–	–	–	–	–		

== Skaters ==
Skaters
Player	Olympics	Tournaments	GP	G	A	P	PIM	Notes	Ref(s)
Nicolae Andrei	1	1964	8	2	0	0	0		
Elöd Antal	2	1976, 1980	11	5	4	9	2		
István Antal	1	1980	5	0	0	0	0		
Dumitru Axinte	2	1976, 1980	11	3	3	6	0		
Ion Başa	1	1968	5	0	2	2	0		
Ion Berdilă	1	1980	5	0	0	0	8		
Anton Biró	1	1964	8	4	0	4	0		
Vasile Boldescu	1	1968	2	0	0	0	0		
Alexandru Calamar	2	1964, 1968	13	4	2	6	2		
Traian Cazan	1	1980	5	2	0	2	12		
Marian Costea	2	1976, 1980	11	6	5	11	26		
Zoltan Czaka	2	1964, 1968	13	2	0	2	2		
Zoltan Fagarasi	1	1968	5	1	3	4	2		
Ion Ferenz	1	1964	8	5	0	0	0		
Iulian Florescu	2	1964, 1968	13	4	3	7	6		
Şandor Gal	2	1976, 1980	10	1	4	5	10		
Ioan Gheorghiu	2	1968, 1976	8	0	1	1	0		
Alexandru Hălăucă	2	1976, 1980	10	2	1	3	10		
Vasile Huțanu	1	1976	5	1	0	1	2		
Andrei Ioanovici	1	1964	4	0	0	0	0		
Ştefan Ionescu	2	1964, 1968	13	2	5	7	6		
Ion Ioniță	1	1976	5	0	1	1	2		
George Justinian	2	1976, 1980	10	1	2	3	4		
Dan Mihăilescu	1	1964	5	0	0	0	0		
Tiberiu Mikloș	1	1976	5	0	1	1	0		
Aurel Moiș	1	1968	5	2	0	2	2		
Doru Moroșan	2	1976, 1980	10	0	2	2	0		
Adalbert Naghi	1	1964	5	0	0	0	0		
Béla Nagy	1	1980	5	0	0	0	4		
Zoltán Nagy	1	1980	5	0	0	0	2		
Constantin Nistor	1	1980	5	0	1	1	4		
Adrian Olenici	1	1980	5	1	0	1	2		
Eduard Pană	3	1964, 1968, 1976	14	8	10	18	2	IIHFHOF (1998)	
Marian Pisaru	2	1976, 1980	10	4	2	6	4		
Mihail Lucian Popescu	1	1980	5	0	0	0	0		
Răzvan Schiau	1	1968	5	0	0	0	0		
László Sólyom	1	1980	5	0	1	1	6		
Valentin Ștefan	1	1968	5	1	2	3	0		
Geza Szabo	2	1964, 1968	13	10	2	12	0		
Iuliu Szabo	2	1964, 1968	13	10	3	13	0		
Ştefan Texe	1	1968	5	1	0	1	2		
Ion Țiriac	1	1964	6	0	0	0	0		
Doru Tureanu	2	1976, 1980	11	11	8	19	31	IIHFHOF (2011)	
Dezső Varga	3	1964, 1968, 1976	18	2	5	7	2		
Nicolae Vișan	1	1976	5	0	0	0	2		
