= List of Romanian sportspeople =

== Athletics ==
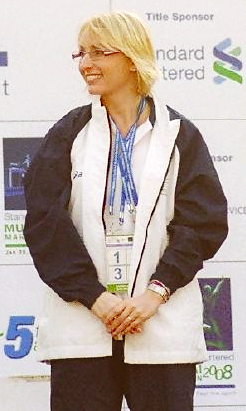
Gabriela Szabo

- Alina Astafei
- Iolanda Balaș
- Violeta Beclea
- Valeria Bufanu
- Maria Cioncan
- Anișoara Cușmir-Stanciu
- Constantina Diţă
- Paula Ivan
- Lia Manoliu
- Gheorghe Megelea
- Doina Melinte
- Argentina Menis
- Marian Oprea
- Oana Pantelimon
- Mihaela Peneș
- Maricica Puică
- Ileana Silai
- Lidia Șimon
- Gabriela Szabo
- Ionela Târlea
- Viorica Viscopoleanu

== Biathlon ==
- Vilmoş Gheorghe
- Éva Tófalvi

== Bobsleigh ==
- Dumitru Focşeneanu
- Dumitru Hubert
- Nicolae Neagoe
- Ion Panţuru
- Alexandru Papană

== Boxing ==
- Ion Alexe
- Dumitru Cipere
- Calistrat Cuțov
- Simion Cuțov
- Costică Dafinoiu
- Mircea Dobrescu
- Leonard Doroftei
- Constantin Dumitrescu
- Gheorghe Fiat
- Ionuţ Gheorghe
- Nicolae Linca
- Ion Monea
- Alec Năstac
- Gheorghe Negrea
- Valentin Silaghi
- Dorel Simion
- Marian Simion
- Mircea Şimon
- Vasile Tiță
- Victor Zilberman

== Canoeing ==
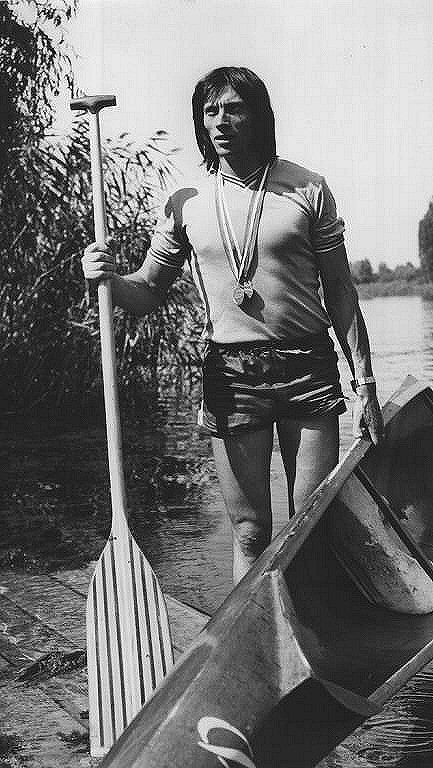
Ivan Patzaichin

- Gheorghe Andriev
- Ion Bîrlădeanu
- Antonel Borșan
- Anton Calenic
- Petre Capusta
- Serghei Covaliov
- Simion Cuciuc
- Gheorghe Danielov
- Vasile Dîba
- Alexe Dumitru
- Viorica Dumitru
- Nicușor Eșanu
- Ion Geantă
- Marcel Glăvan
- Andrei Igorov
- Raluca Ioniță
- Simion Ismailciuc
- Dimitrie Ivanov
- Haralambie Ivanov
- Hilde Lauer
- Mariana Limbău
- Policarp Malîhin
- Maria Nichiforov
- Grigore Obreja
- Ivan Patzaichin
- Florin Popescu
- Mitică Pricop
- Elena Radu
- Leon Rotman
- Atanase Sciotnic
- Larion Serghei
- Cornelia Sideri
- Gheorghe Simionov
- Toma Simionov
- Sanda Toma
- Mihai Țurcaș
- Roman Vartolomeu
- Aurel Vernescu
- Mihai Zafiu

== Equestrian ==
- Anghelache Donescu
- Henri Rang
- Petre Roşca
- Dumitru Velicu

== Fencing ==
- Laura Badea-Cârlescu
- Ana Maria Brânză
- Mihai Covaliu
- Ana Derșidan-Ene-Pascu
- Tiberiu Dolniceanu
- Ion Drîmbă
- Rareș Dumitrescu
- Ileana Gyulai-Drîmbă-Jenei
- Dan Irimiciuc
- Cornel Marin
- Marin Mustață
- Alexandru Nilca
- Ioan Pop
- Roxana Scarlat
- Alexandru Sirițeanu
- Ecaterina Stahl-Iencic
- Reka Zsofia Lazăr-Szabo
- Olga Orban-Szabo
- Maria Vicol
- Florin Zalomir

== Football ==
- Miodrag Belodedici
- Doru Buican
- Gheorghe Hagi
- Ciprian Marica
- Viorel Moldovan
- Dorinel Munteanu
- Adrian Mutu
- Constantin Pistol
- Andrei Șeran

== Gymnastics ==
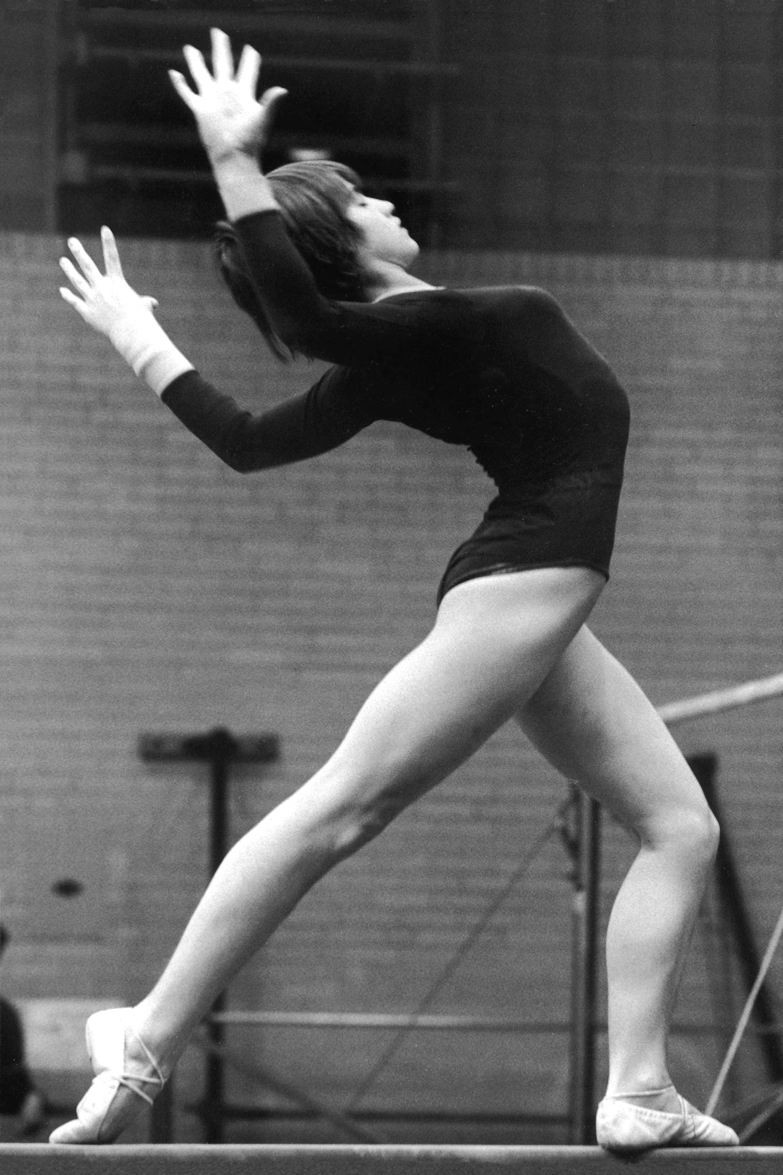
Nadia Comăneci during her practice session for an appearance at the Hartford Civic Center (October 1977)

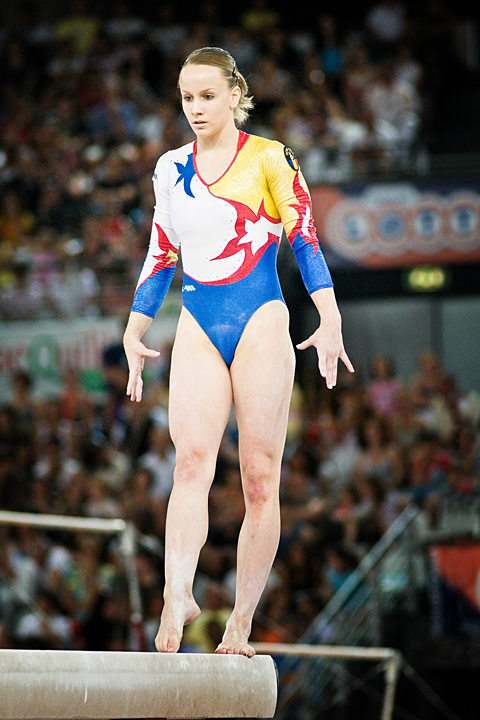
Sandra Izbașa

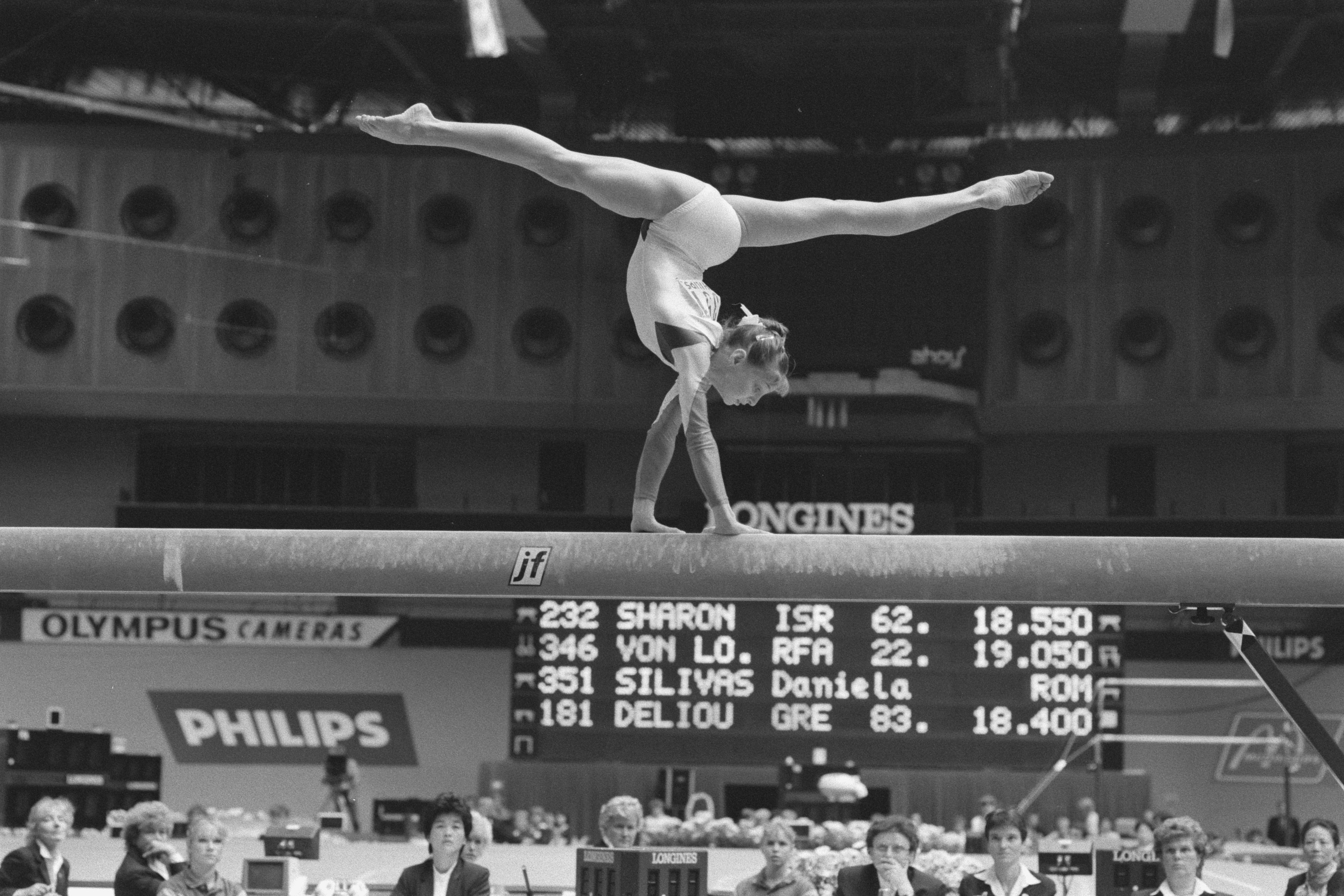
Daniela Silivaș at the 1987 World Championships

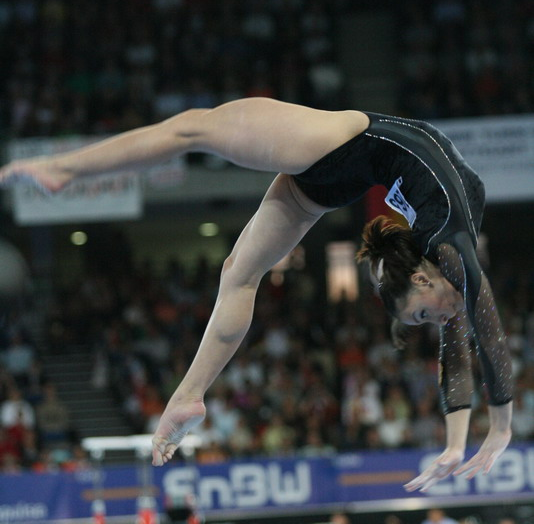
Cătălina Ponor in 2007

- Andreea Acatrinei
- Simona Amânar
- Oana Ban
- Loredana Boboc
- Cristina Bontaș
- Diana Bulimar
- Dan Burincă
- Diana Chelaru
- Nadia Comăneci
- Mariana Constantin
- Gabriela Drăgoi
- Marian Drăgulescu
- Rodica Dunca
- Emilia Eberle
- Alexandra Eremia
- Georgeta Gabor
- Gina Gogean
- Dănuț Grecu
- Anca Grigoraș
- Andreea Grigore
- Vanda Hădărean
- Georgeta Hurmuzachi
- Atanasia Ionescu
- Larisa Iordache
- Sonia Iovan
- Andreea Isărescu
- Sandra Izbașa
- Elena Leuşteanu
- Ionela Loaieș
- Elena Mărgărit
- Alexandra Marinescu
- Lavinia Miloșovici
- Maria Neculiţă
- Steliana Nistor
- Maria Olaru
- Mirela Paşca
- Cătălina Ponor
- Ilie Daniel Popescu
- Uta Poreceanu
- Dan Nicolae Potra
- Claudia Presăcan
- Andreea Răducan
- Monica Roșu
- Melita Ruhn
- Elena Săcălici
- Răzvan Dorin Șelariu
- Daniela Silivaș
- Nicoleta Daniela Șofronie
- Silvia Stroescu
- Ioan Silviu Suciu
- Anamaria Tămârjan
- Gabriela Trușcă
- Mirela Țugurlan
- Dumitriţa Turner
- Teodora Ungureanu
- Marius Urzică
- Emilia Vătăşoiu

== Handball ==
- Mircea Bedivan
- Dumitru Berbece
- Ștefan Birtalan
- Iosif Boroș
- Alexandru Buligan
- Adrian Cosma
- Gheorghe Covaciu
- Marin Dan
- Alexandru Dincă
- Gheorghe Dogărescu
- Cezar Drăgăniță
- Marian Dumitru
- Cornel Durău
- Valentina Ardean-Elisei
- Alexander Fölker
- Mircea Grabovschi
- Cristian Gațu
- Gheorghe Gruia
- Roland Gunesch
- Claudiu Eugen Ionescu
- Gabriel Kicsid
- Ghiţă Licu
- Nicolae Munteanu
- Cristina Neagu
- Vasile Oprea
- Cornel Penu
- Valentin Samungi
- Simon Schobel
- Adrian Simion
- Vasile Stîngă
- Werner Stöckl
- Constantin Tudosie
- Lucian Vasilache
- Neculai Vasilcă
- Radu Voina
- Maricel Voinea

== Ice hockey ==
- Elöd Antal
- Istvan Antal
- Dumitru Axinte
- Ion Berdilă
- Cazacu Cazan
- Marian Costea
- Şandor Gal
- Ioan Gheorghiu
- Alexandru Hălăucă
- Gheorghe Huţan
- Vasile Huțanu
- Ion Ioniță
- George Justinian
- Tiberiu Mikloş
- Vasile Morar
- Doru Moroşan
- Bela Nagy
- Zoltán Nagy
- Valerian Netedu
- Constantin Nistor
- Adrian Olenici
- Eduard Pană
- Marian Pisaru
- Mihail Popescu
- László Sólyom
- Doru Tureanu
- Dezső Varga
- Nicolae Vişan

== Judo ==
- Corina Căprioriu
- Alina Dumitru
- Simona Richter

== Luge ==
- Ioan Apostol

== Rowing ==
- Felicia Afrăsiloaie
- Angela Alupei
- Angelica Aposteanu
- Aurica Bărăscu
- Enikő Barabás
- Elena Bondar
- Florica Bucur
- Constanța Burcică
- Petre Ceapura
- Veronica Cochela
- Maria Constantinescu
- Georgeta Damian
- Elena Dobrițoiu
- Maria Magdalena Dumitrache
- Rodica Frîntu
- Liliana Gafencu
- Elena Georgescu
- Elena Giurcă
- Olga Homeghi
- Doina Ignat
- Ana Iliuță
- Elisabeta Lipă
- Ladislau Lovrenschi
- Camelia Macoviciuc-Mihalcea
- Maria Micșa
- Simona Muşat
- Ioana Olteanu
- Ioana Papuc
- Dimitrie Popescu
- Marioara Popescu
- Valeria Răcilă
- Dumitru Răducanu
- Iulică Ruican
- Rodica Şerban
- Doina Spîrcu
- Viorica Susanu
- Nicolae Țaga
- Viorel Talapan
- Anca Tănase
- Sanda Toma
- Ioana Tudoran
- Ştefan Tudor
- Marlena Zagoni

== Rugby union ==
- Gheorghe Benţia
- Teodor Florian
- Nicolae Mărăscu
- Mircea Sfetescu

== Shooting ==
- Ion Dumitrescu
- Corneliu Ion
- Daniel Iuga
- Gheorghe Lichiardopol
- Alin Moldoveanu
- Ştefan Petrescu
- Iulian Raicea
- Marcel Roşca
- Nicolae Rotaru
- Iosif Sîrbu
- Ion Tripşa

== Speed skating ==
- Mihaela Dascălu

== Swimming ==
- Beatrice Câșlaru
- Răzvan Florea
- Diana Mocanu
- Camelia Potec
- Timea Toth, Romanian-born Israeli Olympic swimmer

== Tennis ==
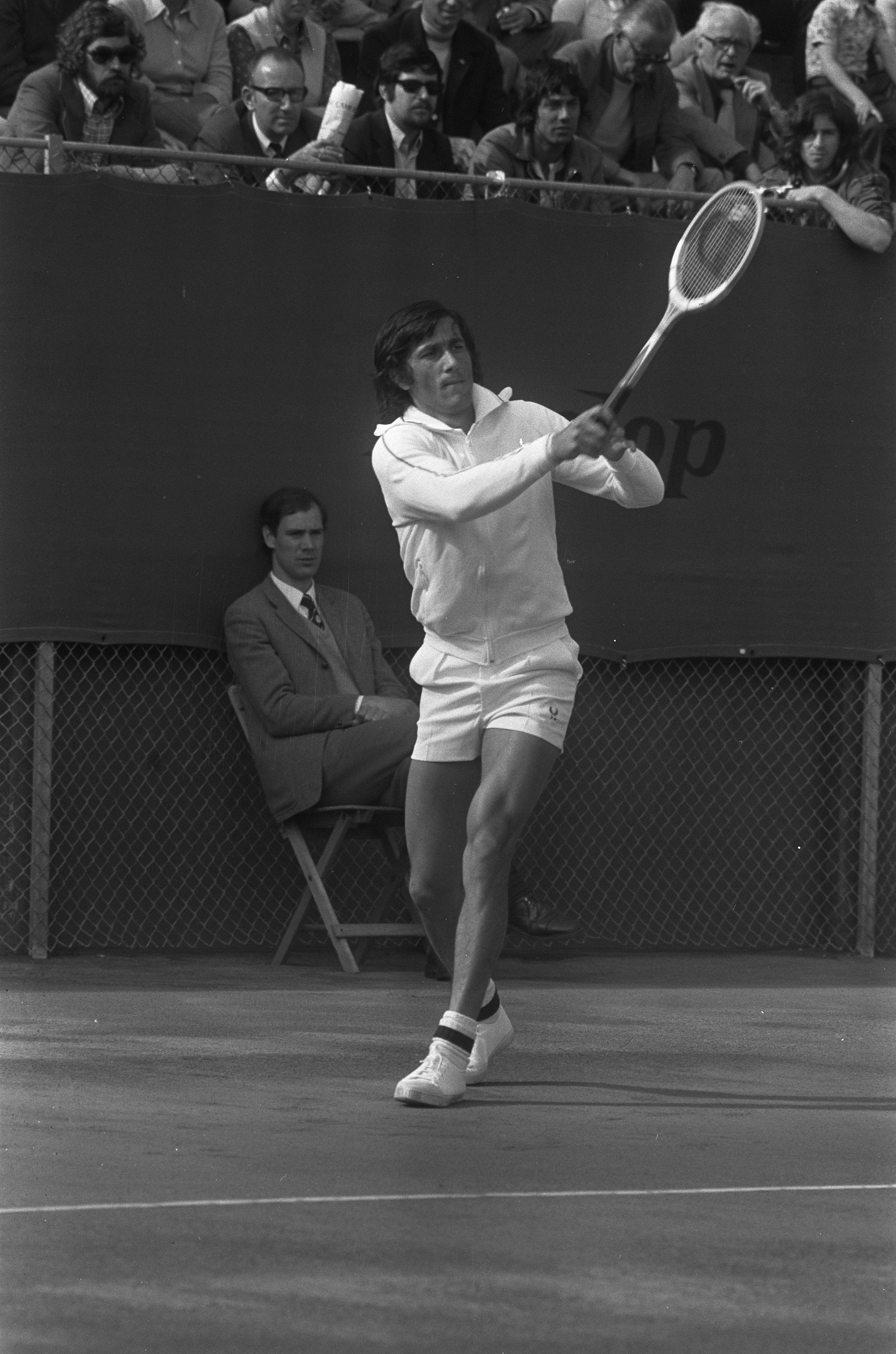
Ilie Năstase playing a Davis Cup match against The Netherlands in The Hague (1973)

- Irina-Camelia Begu
- Sorana Cîrstea
- Simona Halep
- Victor Hănescu
- Ilie Năstase
- Monica Niculescu
- Raluca Olaru
- Andrei Pavel
- Magda Rurac
- Virginia Ruzici
- Mariana Simionescu
- Irina Spîrlea
- Horia Tecău
- Ion Țiriac

== Volleyball ==
- Marius Căta-Chiţiga
- Valter Chifu
- Laurenţiu Dumănoiu
- Günther Enescu
- Dan Gîrleanu
- Sorin Macavei
- Viorel Manole
- Florin Mina
- Corneliu Oros
- Nicolae Pop
- Constantin Sterea
- Nicu Stoian

== Water polo ==
- Cosmin Radu
- Bogdan Rath

== Weightlifting ==
- Roxana Cocoș
- Răzvan Martin
- Nicu Vlad

== Wrestling ==
- Constantin Alexandru
- Vasile Andrei
- Ion Baciu
- Gheorghe Berceanu
- Valeriu Bularca
- Ion Cernea
- Roman Codreanu
- Petre Dicu
- Victor Dolipschi
- Nicu Gingă
- Francisc Horvat
- Vasile Iorga
- Nicolae Martinescu
- Stelică Morcov
- Dumitru Pârvulescu
- Simion Popescu
- Ștefan Rusu
- Ladislau Şimon
- Ion Țăranu

== See also ==
- Sport in Romania
- Romania at the Olympics
