= Romania at the 1980 Winter Olympics =

- IOC code: ROU (ROM used at these Games)
- NOC: Romanian Olympic and Sports Committee
- Website: www.cosr.ro (in Romanian, English, and French)

in Lake Placid
- Competitors: 35 (33 men, 2 women) in 4 sports
- Flag bearer: Gheorghe Lixandru
- Medals: Gold 0 Silver 0 Bronze 0 Total 0

Winter Olympics appearances (overview)
- 1928; 1932; 1936; 1948; 1952; 1956; 1960; 1964; 1968; 1972; 1976; 1980; 1984; 1988; 1992; 1994; 1998; 2002; 2006; 2010; 2014; 2018; 2022; 2026

Romania competed at the 1980 Winter Olympics in Lake Placid, United States.

== Bobsleigh ==
Sled	Athletes	Event	Run 1		Run 2		Run 3		Run 4		Total	
Sled	Athletes	Event	Time	Rank	Time	Rank	Time	Rank	Time	Rank	Time	Rank
ROU-1	Dragoș Panaitescu-Rapan; Gheorghe Lixandru	Two-man	1:03.99	13	1:04.30	13	1:03.75	12	1:04.00	12	4:16.04	11
ROU-2	Constantin Iancu; Constantin Obreja	Two-man	1:04.58	16	1:04.52	15	1:04.76	19	1:04.77	18	4:18.63	18

Sled	Athletes	Event	Run 1		Run 2		Run 3		Run 4		Total	
Sled	Athletes	Event	Time	Rank	Time	Rank	Time	Rank	Time	Rank	Time	Rank
ROU-1	Dragoș Panaitescu-Rapan; Dorel Cristudor; Sandu Mitrofan; Gheorghe Lixandru	Four-man	1:01.42	10	1:01.32	9	1:00.61	9	1:01.33	9	4:04.68	8
ROU-2	Constantin Iancu; Ion Duminicel; Doru Frîncu; Constantin Obreja	Four-man	1:01.85	17	1:02.16	16	1:01.74	15	1:01.76	13	4:07.51	14

== Ice hockey ==
=== First round - Blue Division ===
Team advanced to the Final Round
Team advanced to Consolation Round

Team	GP	W	L	T	GF	GA	Pts
Sweden	5	4	0	1	26	7	9
United States	5	4	0	1	25	10	9
Czechoslovakia	5	3	2	0	34	16	6
Romania	5	1	3	1	13	29	3
West Germany	5	1	4	0	21	30	2
Norway	5	0	4	1	9	36	1

All times are local (UTC-5).

12 February 1980; 16:30	Romania	6 – 4 (1–1, 2–3, 3–0)	West Germany	Olympic Arena, Lake Placid

Referee:
Neagles

Costea (Moroşan) (PP) - 5:15	1 – 0
	1 – 1	11:50 - Vacatko (Philipp, Krüll)
	1 – 2	22:37 - Truntschka (Egen, Kiessling)
Costea (E. Antal, Tureanu) (PP) - 24:46	2 – 2
	2 – 3	26:13 - Vacatko (Kuhl, Philipp)
	2 – 4	35:34 - Egen (Scharf) (PP)
Tureanu (Gall, Costea) - 37:46	3 – 4
Tureanu (Costea) - 44:12	4 – 4
Tureanu (Gall) - 46:30	5 – 4
Olenici - 53:17	6 – 4

16 min
Penalties
16 min
38
Shots
53

14 February 1980; 13:00	Romania	0 – 8 (0–3, 0–4, 0–1)	Sweden	Olympic Arena, Lake Placid

Referee:
(Finland) Karl-Gustav Kaisla

0 – 1	00:40 - Åhlberg (Näslund)
0 – 2	05:59 - Lundqvist (Samuelsson, Berglund)
0 – 3	07:42 - J. Eriksson (Waltin)
0 – 4	21:50 - T. Eriksson (Söderström, Molin) (PP)
0 – 5	28:05 - Molin
0 – 6	32:31 - Molin (Berglund)
0 – 7	37:17 - Lundholm (H. Eriksson)
0 – 8	50:18 - Jonsson (Holmgren)

26 min
Penalties
15 min
19
Shots
44

16 February 1980; 13:00	Romania	2 – 7 (0–2, 1–3, 1–2)	Czechoslovakia	Olympic Fieldhouse, Lake Placid

Referee:
(West Germany) Josef Kompalla

	0 – 1	13:35 - P. Šťastný (Bubla, A. Šťastný)
	0 – 2	19:00 - Lukáč (Nový, Pouzar)
Cazacu (Halauca, Sólyom) - 21:39	1 – 2
	1 – 3	26:07 - Kadlec
	1 – 4	28:43 - Nový (Pouzar, Kaberle)
	1 – 5	33:41 - P. Šťastný
	1 – 6	41:46 - Lukáč (Neliba)
Cazacu (Gall) - 44:08	2 – 6
	2 – 7	45:46 - Pouzar (Lukáč, Nový)

6 min
Penalties
2 min
29
Shots
45

18 February 1980; 20:30	United States	7 – 2 (2–0, 2–1, 3–1)	Romania	Olympic Fieldhouse, Lake Placid

Referee:
Dombrovski

Schneider (Pavelich, Harrington) - 12:03	1 – 0
Strobel (Schneider, Ramesy) - 15:52	2 – 0
Wells (Verchota, Morrow) - 29:34	3 – 0
	3 – 1	33:40 - Tureanu (Nistor) (PP)
Schneider (Harrington) - 37:05	4 – 1
Christoff (O'Callahan) (PP) - 43:14	5 – 1
	5 – 2	52:48 - Halauca (Moroşan)
Broten (Eruzione) - 56:12	6 – 2
McClanahan (Johnson) - 58:09	7 – 2

6 min
Penalties
10 min
51
Shots
21

20 February 1980; 13:00	Norway	3 – 3 (1–1, 0–1, 2–1)	Romania	Olympic Arena, Lake Placid

Referee:
(Czechoslovakia) Vladimir Šubrt

Foyn (Myhre, Falk Nilsen) (PP) - 00:56	1 – 0
	1 – 1	05:10 - Costea (E. Antal, Tureanu)
	1 – 2	31:27 - Gall (E. Antal, Axinte)
	1 – 3	52:43 - Tureanu (Gall)
Sethereng (Falk Nilsen, Molberg) (PP) - 58:39	2 – 3
Molberg (Myhre, Nilsen) - 59:31	3 – 3

26 min
Penalties
18 min
24
Shots
29

Contestants; Valerian Netedu; Gheorghe Huţan; Mihail Lucian Popescu; Ion Berdilă; Şandor Gal; Elöd Antal; Istvan Antal; Doru Moroşan; George Justinian; Doru Tureanu; Dumitru Axinte; Marian Costea; Constantin Nistor; Alexandru Hălăucă; Laszlo Solyom; Bela Nagy; Cazacu Cazan; Adrian Olenici; Marian Pisaru; Zoltan Nagy

== Luge ==
(Men's) Doubles

Athletes	Run 1		Run 2		Total	
Athletes	Time	Rank	Time	Rank	Time	Rank
Ioan Apostol; Cristinel Piciorea	40.757	15	41.909	16	1:22.666	15

Women

Athlete	Run 1		Run 2		Run 3		Run 4		Total	
Athlete	Time	Rank	Time	Rank	Time	Rank	Time	Rank	Time	Rank
Maria Maioru	41.071	25	41.054	21	41.120	19	41.350	22	2:44.595	21
Elena Stan	40.852	21	41.489	24	41.085	18	41.040	18	2:44.466	20

== Speed skating ==
Men

Event	Athlete	Race	
Event	Athlete	Time	Rank
500 m	Dezsö Jenei	40.84	30
500 m	Vasile Coroş	40.30	27
1000 m	Dezsö Jenei	1:22.66	33
1000 m	Vasile Coroş	1:21.89	31
5000 m	Andrei Erdely	7:34.41	22
10,000 m	Andrei Erdely	15:31.73	20

== Sources ==
- Official Olympic Reports
- Olympic Winter Games 1980, full results by sports-reference.com
