= Ion Ioniță =

Ion Ioniţă may refer to:

- Ion Ioniță (ice hockey) (born 1951), Romanian ice hockey player
- Ion Ioniță (cyclist) (born 1928), Romanian cyclist
- Ioan Ioniță, Romanian general and politician
