= Zoltán Nagy =

Zoltán Nagy may refer to:

- Zoltán Nagy (footballer born 1974), Hungarian football player and coach
- Zoltán Nagy (footballer born 1985), Hungarian footballer
- Zoltán Nagy (ice hockey) (born 1955), Romanian ice hockey player
