= Vișan =

Vișan is a village in Bârnova Commune, Iași County, Romania.

It is also the surname of:

- Dorel Vișan (born 1937), Romanian actor
- Gheorghe Vișan, original name of Romanian literary critic, historian, novelist, academician and journalist George Călinescu (1899–1965)
- Ioana lui Vișan, pseudonym of Romanian poet and editor N. T. Orășanu (1833–1890)
- Monica Vișan (born 1979), Romanian mathematician
- Nicolae Vișan (1956–2017), Romanian ice hockey player
- Paula Vișan, goalkeeper for Romanian women's handball team HC Zalău
- Raymond Vișan, French-Romanian restaurateur, creator of Buddha Bar
