= Dezső Varga =

Romanian ice hockey player (born 1939)

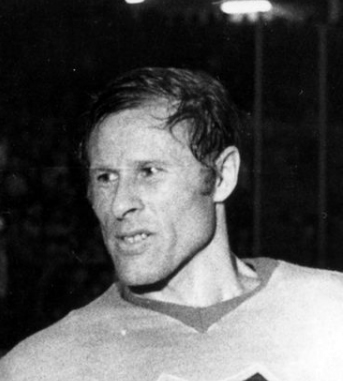
- Born: 14 May 1939 (age 87) Miercurea Ciuc, Romania
- Height: 178 cm (5 ft 10 in)
- Weight: 80 kg (176 lb; 12 st 8 lb)
- Position: Defenceman
- Shot: Right
- Played for: Steaua Rangers; Dinamo Bucuresti; Recolta Miercurea Ciuc; Voința Miercurea Ciuc
- National team: Romania
- Playing career: 1959–1979

Dezideriu "Dezső" Varga (born 14 May 1939) is a Romanian former ice hockey player. As a defenceman, he led his hometown Miercurea Ciuc to two Romanian Hockey League titles. He transferred to the Steaua Rangers in 1965, where he won nine national titles and seven Romanian Hockey League championships. He played for the Romania men's national team from 1959 to 1977, and served as the team captain from 1969 onward. He was the only Romanian to play in three Winter Olympic Games tournaments, and participated in 17 Ice Hockey World Championships. He led Romania to a seventh-place finish at the 1976 Winter Olympics, and the team's only appearance in the top tier of the World Championships in 1977. He received the Torriani Award from the International Ice Hockey Federation in 2024, in recognition of career accomplishments by players from smaller hockey nations.

== Early life and family ==
Dezideriu Varga was born on 14 May 1939, in Miercurea Ciuc, Romania. His family are Szeklers; Romanian persons of Hungarian descent native to the Székely Land.

== Playing career ==
=== Romanian Hockey League ===
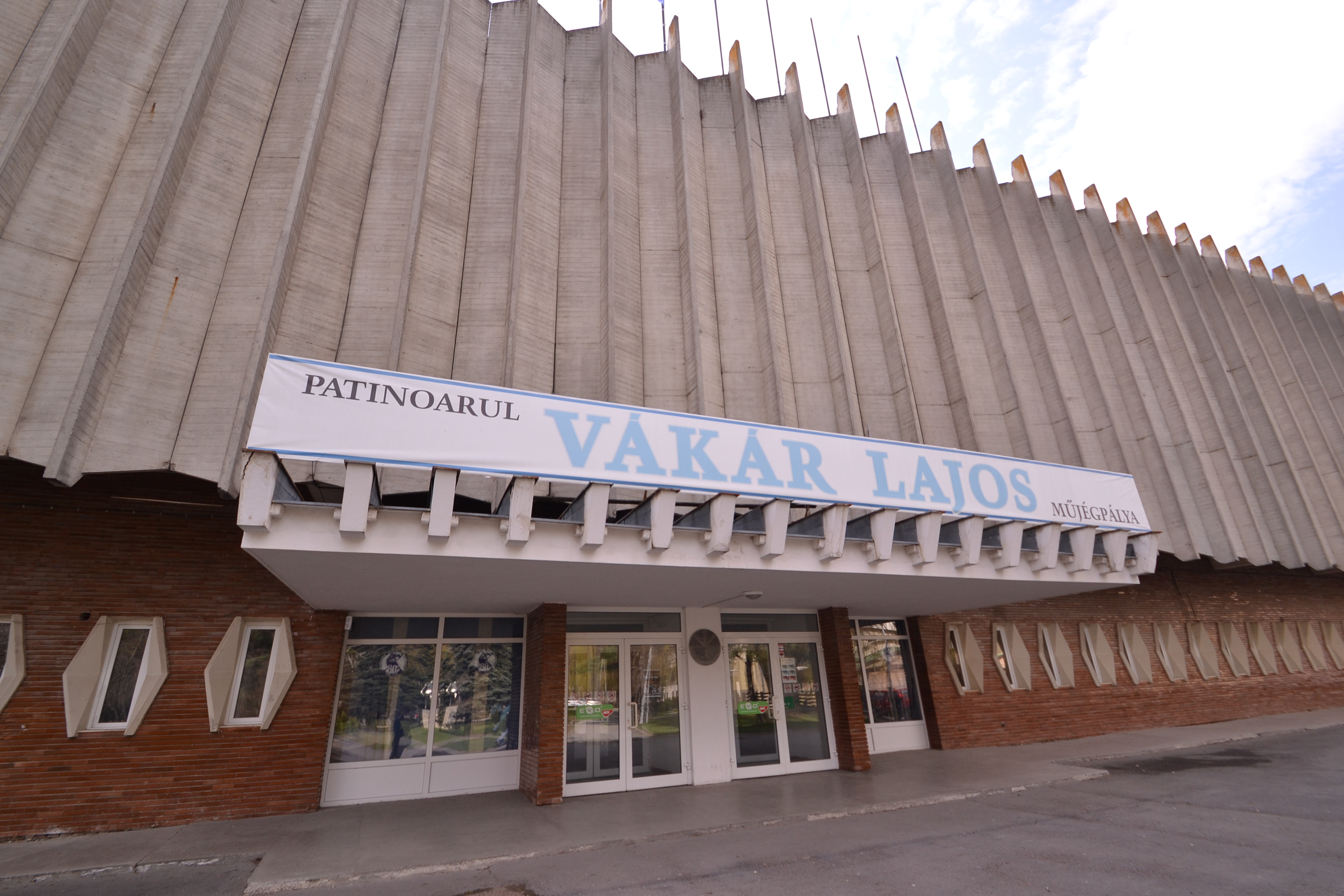
Lajos Vákár Ice Hall was the home arena for hockey teams in Miercurea Ciuc.

Playing ice hockey as a defenceman, Varga stood 178 cm (70 in) tall, and weighed 80 kg (180 lb). He began playing professional hockey in 1959 with Recolta Miercurea Ciuc, later named Voința Miercurea Ciuc. He led Miercurea Ciuc to Romanian Hockey League titles in the 1959–60 and 1962–63 seasons.

Varga transferred to the Steaua Rangers in Bucharest in 1965, when he and four teammates were drafted into military service. After the loss of players, teams from Miercurea Ciuc did not win another league championship during the remainder of his playing career. Varga won nine national titles and seven Romanian Hockey League championships with the Steaua Rangers, and retired from playing in 1979.

=== Romanian national team ===
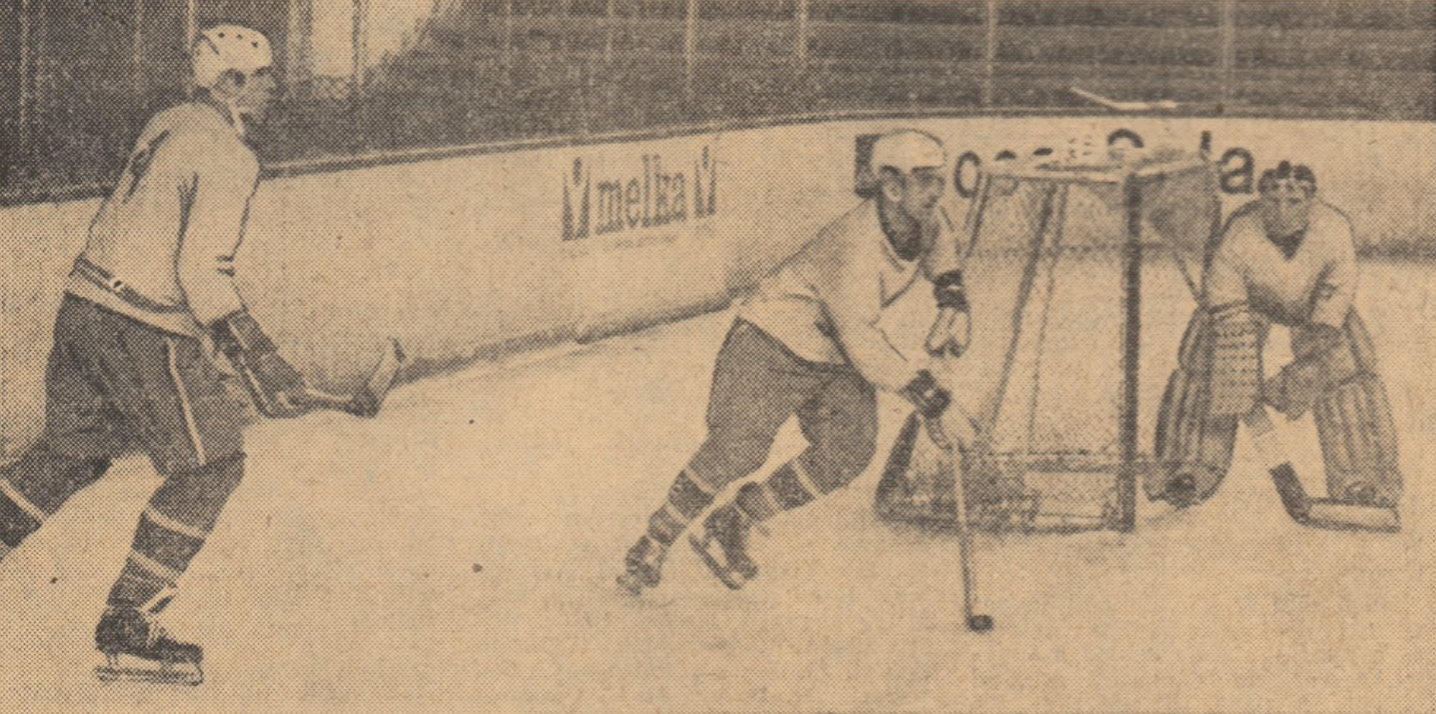
Varga (left) playing for Romania

Varga played for the Romania men's national team from 1959 to 1977, serving as the team captain from 1969 to 1977. He was the only Romanian to play in three Winter Olympic Games tournaments, appearing in 1964, 1968, and 1976. He played at the Ice Hockey World Championships in 17 events for the national team, including three events hosted in Romania—the 1966 qualifying round, the 1970 Group B championships, and the 1972 Group B championships.

Scoring two goals at the 1964 Winter Olympics, Varga helped the Romanian national team to a fourth-place finish in Group B and twelfth place overall. On closing day of the Olympics, Romania played the Hungary national team, winning by an 8–3 score. The Romanian national team was bilingual, included eight ethnic Hungarians, and sang as a team in both Romanian and Hungarian languages.

Varga also helped the Romania national team win a silver medal at the 1966 Winter Universiade in Italy, which included victories versus the Canada national team and Finland national team. He scored four assists at the 1968 Winter Olympics, when Romania placed 12th overall.

At the 1976 Winter Olympics, Varga had one assist in five games played. Romania placed seventh overall in 1976 by winning the consolation round, and were promoted to Group A of the 1977 World Championships. Varga scored two goals and had two assists in ten games played, in Romania's only appearance in the top tier of the World Championships. In a consolation round game versus the United States national team on 5 May 1977, Varga scored one goal and added two assists in a 5–4 victory.

In a 2024 interview, Varga said his fondest hockey memories included winning the 1966 Universiade silver medal, and scoring a goal against the United States in 1977.

== Later life and honors ==
Varga has lived in Miercurea Ciuc since retirement, and has not attended sports events. He received the Torriani Award from the International Ice Hockey Federation (IIHF) in 2024, given to recognize career accomplishments by players from smaller hockey nations. The award inducted him into the IIHF Hall of Fame, with a ceremony on the last day of competition at the 2024 IIHF World Championship. He did not attend for health reasons, and submitted a thank you letter which stated that hockey was his "greatest passion" since childhood, that made him "disciplined and focused by giving me goals in life". With the honor given on the 100th anniversary of the Romanian Ice Hockey Federation joining the IIHF, Varga became the third member of the Romania national team from the 1977 World Championships to be inducted into the IIHF Hall of Fame, along with Eduard Pană and Doru Tureanu. He also became the first Szekler hockey player inducted into the IIHF Hall of Fame.

== Statistics ==
Individual statistics from international play at the Olympic Games and the Ice Hockey World Championships: (Note: Olympics statistics source: Statistics are incomplete for the Ice Hockey World Championships prior to 1977.)

| Year | Team | Event | GP | G | A | Pts | PIM |
|---|---|---|---|---|---|---|---|
| 1964 | Romania | OLY | 8 | 2 | 0 | 2 | 0 |
| 1968 | Romania | OLY | 5 | 0 | 4 | 4 | 2 |
| 1976 | Romania | OLY | 5 | 0 | 1 | 1 | 8 |
| 1977 | Romania | WC | 10 | 2 | 2 | 4 | 4 |
| Olympic Games totals | | | 18 | 2 | 5 | 7 | 10 |
