= Frumoasa, Harghita =

Frumoasa Csíkszépvíz
- Commune
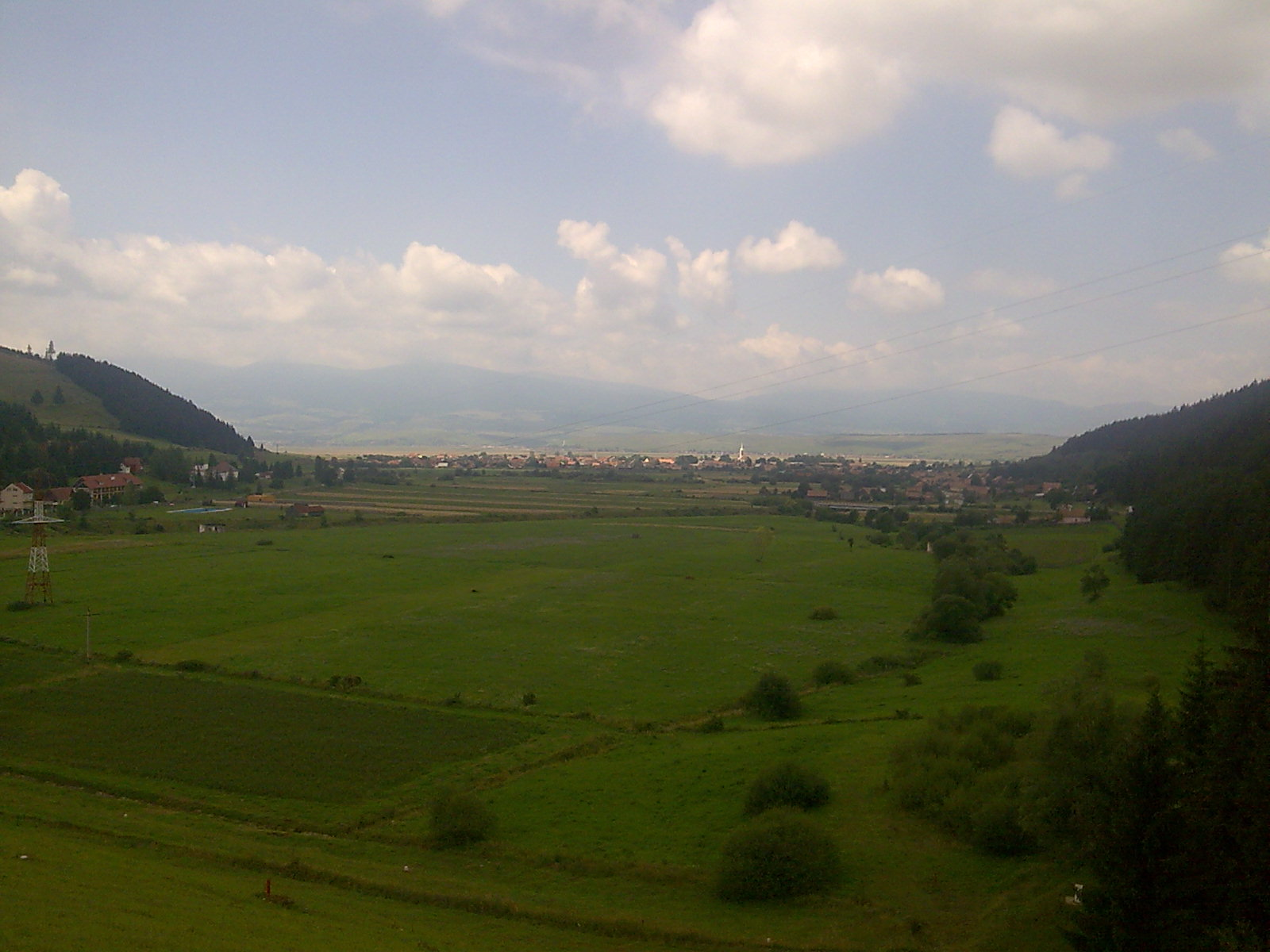
- View from the reservoir

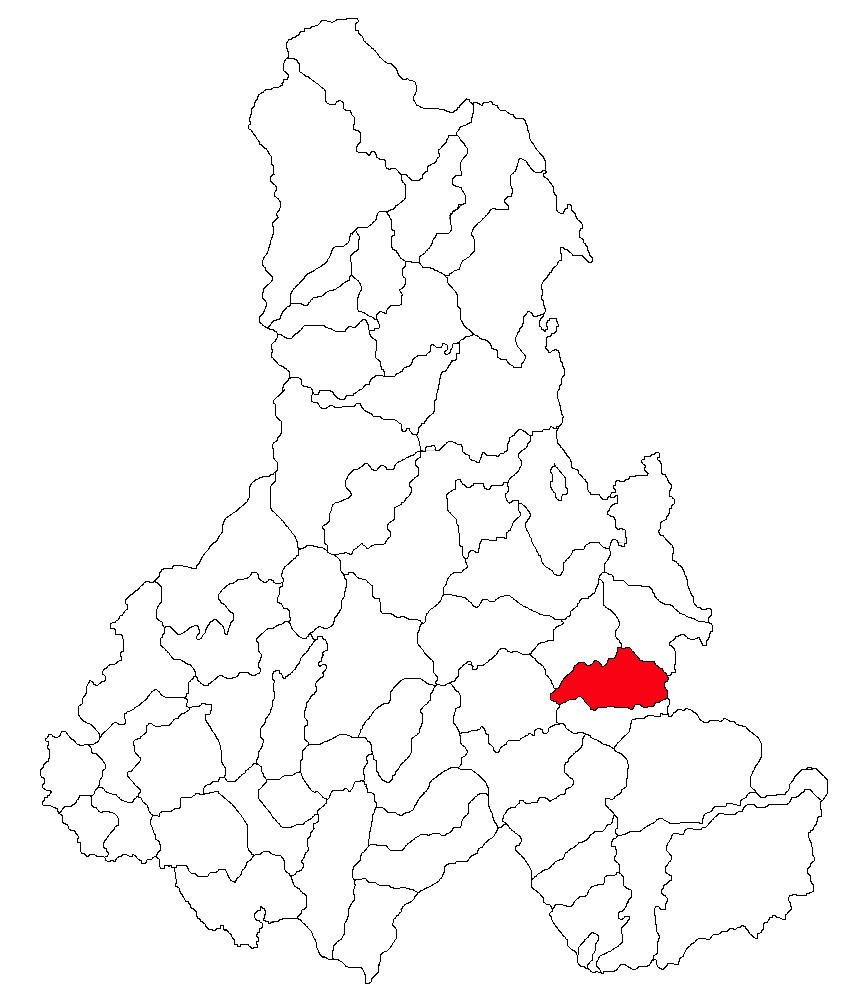
- Location in Harghita County

- Location in Romania
- Coordinates: 46°27′N 25°51′E
- Country: Romania
- County: Harghita

Government
  - Mayor (2020–2024): Tibor Ferencz (UDMR)
- Area: 84.06 km^{2} (32.46 sq mi)
- Elevation: 790 m (2,590 ft)
- Population (2021-12-01): 3,581
  - Density: 42.60/km^{2} (110.3/sq mi)
- Time zone: UTC+02:00 (EET)
  - Summer (DST): UTC+03:00 (EEST)
- Postal code: 537115
- Area code: +(40) 266
- Vehicle reg.: HR
- Website: www.szepviz.eu

Frumoasa (Hungarian: Szépvíz or Csíkszépvíz, Hungarian pronunciation: [ˈtʃiːkseːpviːz]) is a commune in Harghita County, Romania. It is composed of four villages: Bârzava (Csíkborzsova), Făgețel (Bükkloka), Frumoasa, and Nicolești (Csíkszentmiklós).

== Geography ==
The commune lies in the Székely Land, an ethno-cultural region in eastern Transylvania. It is situated in the foothills of the Ciuc Mountains, at an altitude of 790 m (2,590 ft), on the banks of the river Frumoasa. The Frumoasa Dam is located on this river, forming a reservoir with a volume of 10.6 km^{3} (2.5 cu mi).

Frumoasa is located in the eastern part of the county, 17 km (11 mi) northeast of the county seat, Miercurea Ciuc, on the border with Bacău County. It is traversed by the national road DN12A, which connects Miercurea Ciuc with Onești, Bacău County, crossing the Eastern Carpathians through the Ghimeș-Palanca Pass.

== History ==
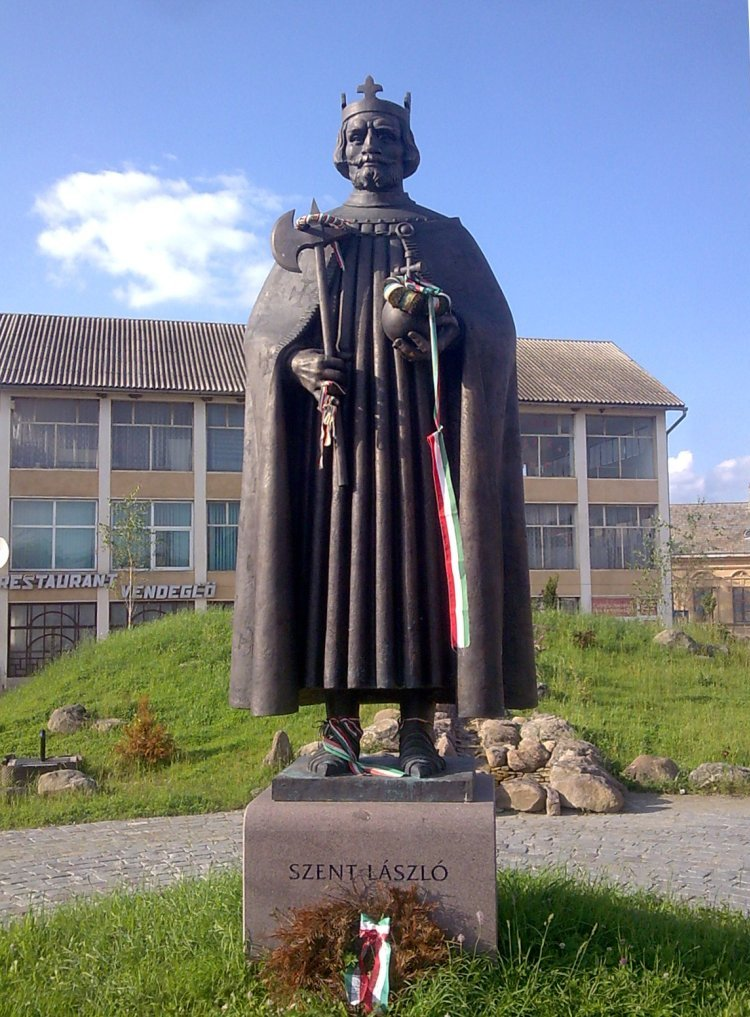
Statue of King Ladislaus I of Hungary on the main square

The first written mention of the village is from 1567 as Zepwyz. In 1602 it was recorded as Szépviz ("beautiful water"). Its original Romanian name derived from the Hungarian toponym as Ciuc-Sepviz which was Romanianized to its current official name in 1919.

According to tradition, the village's original name was Szépmező. According to Balázs Orbán, it was founded during the reign of László I as a community of border guards for the defense of the Ghimeș pass, on the eastern border of the Kingdom of Hungary. The Roman Catholic chapel was built before 1694 by the Bíró family. The Roman Catholic church was built in 1892.

The village administratively belonged to Csíkszék, then, from 1876 until 1918 to the Csík County in the Kingdom of Hungary. In the aftermath of World War I and the Hungarian–Romanian War of 1918–1919, it passed under Romanian administration; after the Treaty of Trianon of 1920, like the rest of Transylvania, it became part of the Kingdom of Romania. During the interwar period, the commune became the seat of plasa Frumoasa in Ciuc County.

In 1940, the Second Vienna Award granted Northern Transylvania to Hungary and the commune was held by Hungary until September 1944. The territory of Northern Transylvania remained under Soviet military administration until March 9, 1945, after which it became again part of Romania. Between 1952 and 1960, the commune fell within the Magyar Autonomous Region, between 1960 and 1968 the Mureș-Magyar Autonomous Region. In 1968, the region was abolished, and since then, the commune has been part of Harghita County.

== Demographics ==
At the 2011 census, the commune had a population of 3,682; out of them, 94% were Hungarians, 2.3% were Romanians, and 1.7% were Roma. At the 2021 census, Frumoasa had a population of 3,581, of which 93.3% were Hungarians and 1.56% Romanians.

For Armenian Catholics, see Ordinariate for Armenian Catholics of Romania. The village of Făgățel has a significant population of ethnic Romanians, numbering 64 of the village's 130 inhabitants.

== Natives ==
- Piroska Abos (born 1962), Spanish cross-country skier
- István Antal (1958 – 2009), Romanian ice hockey player

== Tourist attractions ==
- Saint Gregory the Illuminator Armenian Church
- 'Snowy' Virgin Mary Catholic Parish Church
- Ruins of the St. Ladislaus Gothic chapel on Pagan Mountain
- Biró-Chapel (Craftsmen's Chapel)
- Ski track

== Twin cities ==
- Újkígyós, Hungary

== Gallery ==
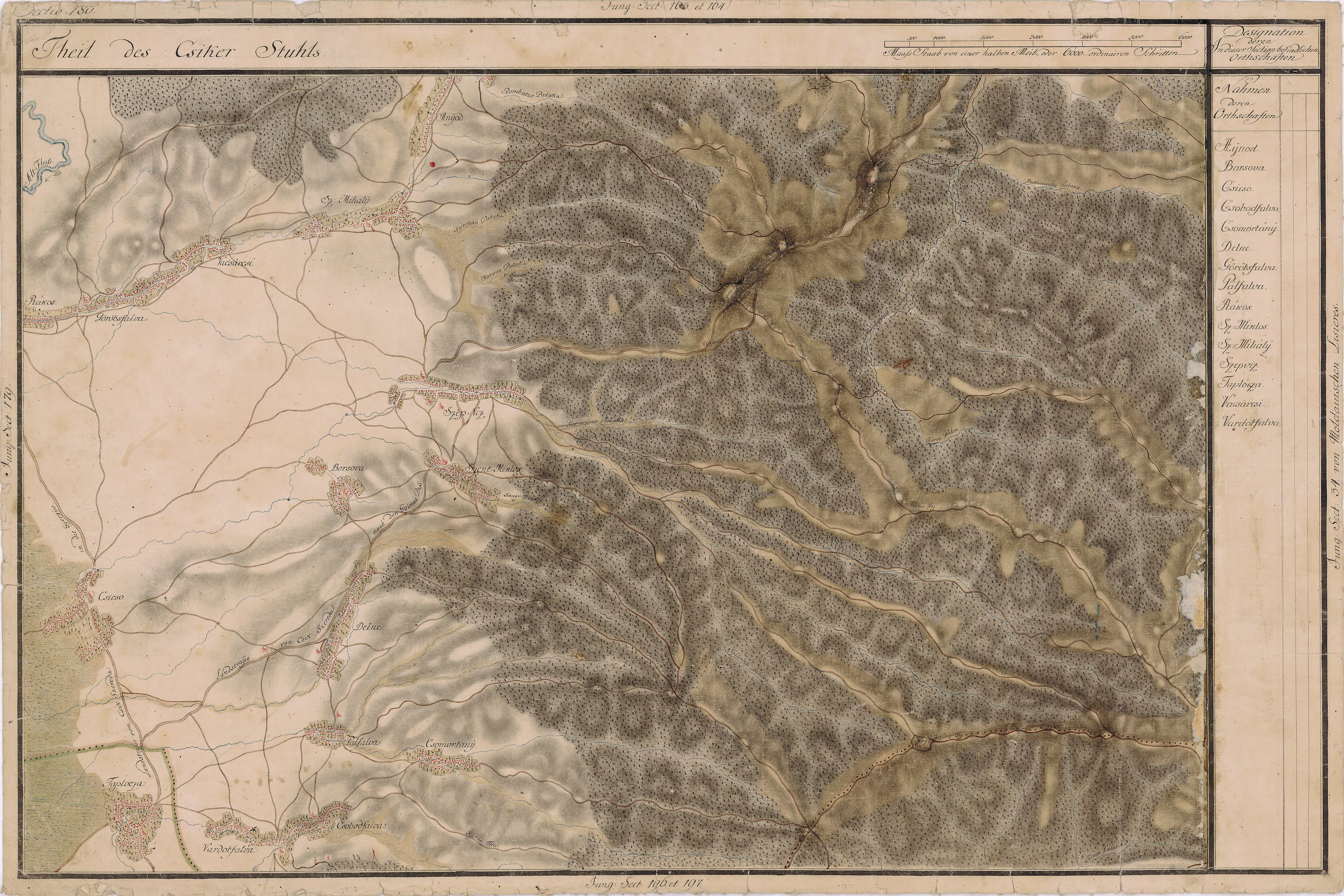
As "Szép Víz" on 18th century map (Josephine Land Survey)

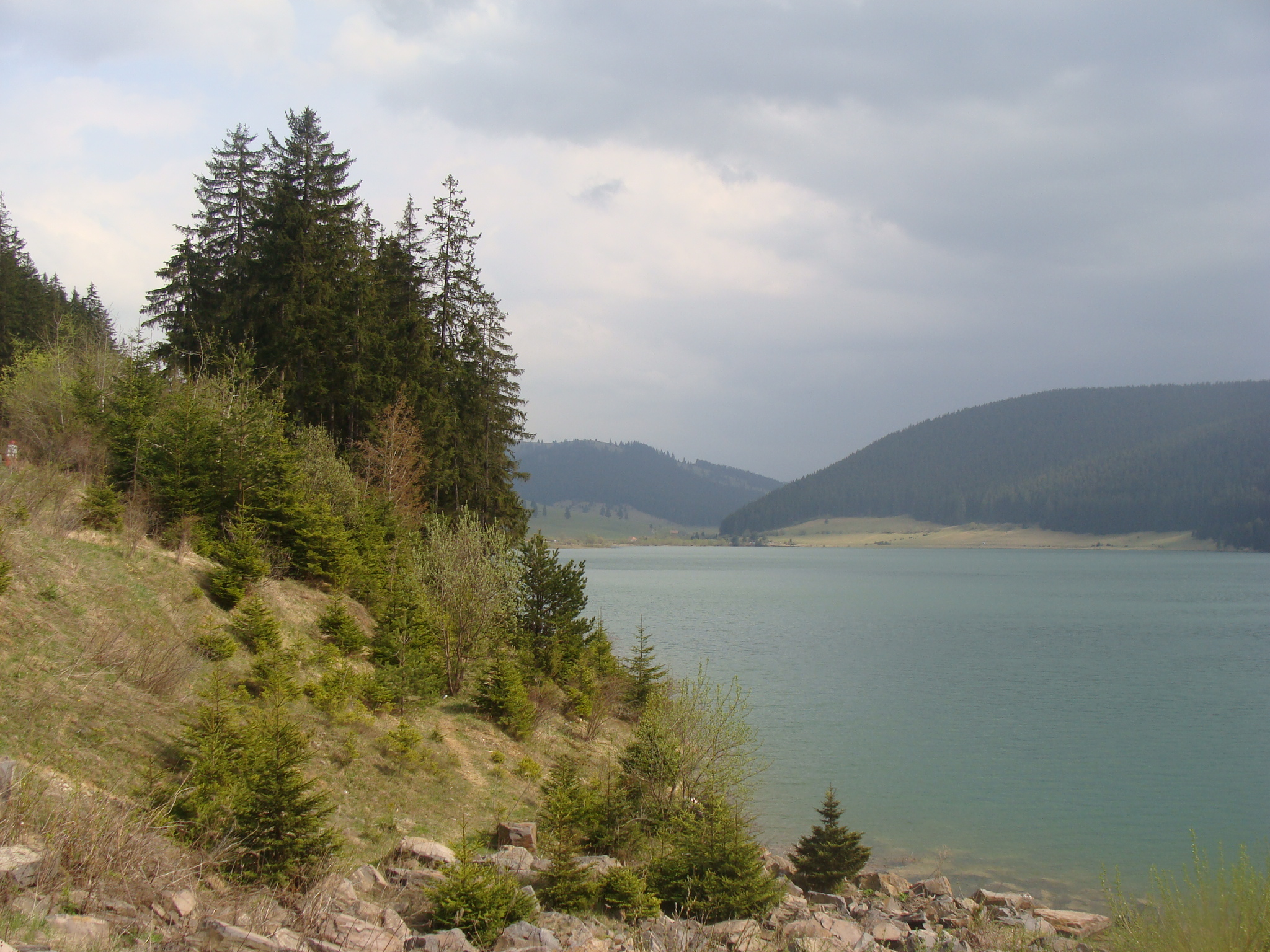
The reservoir

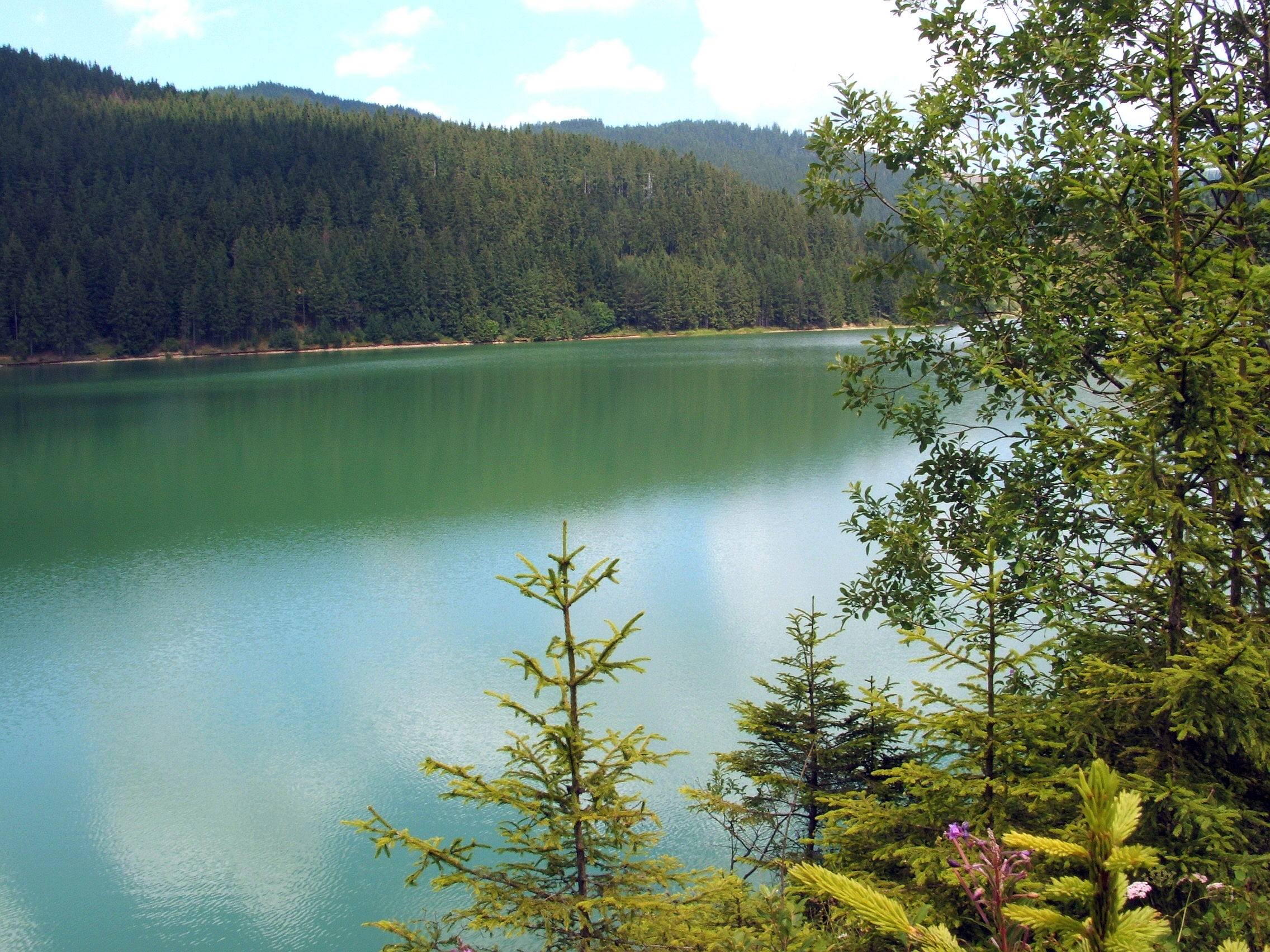
The reservoir

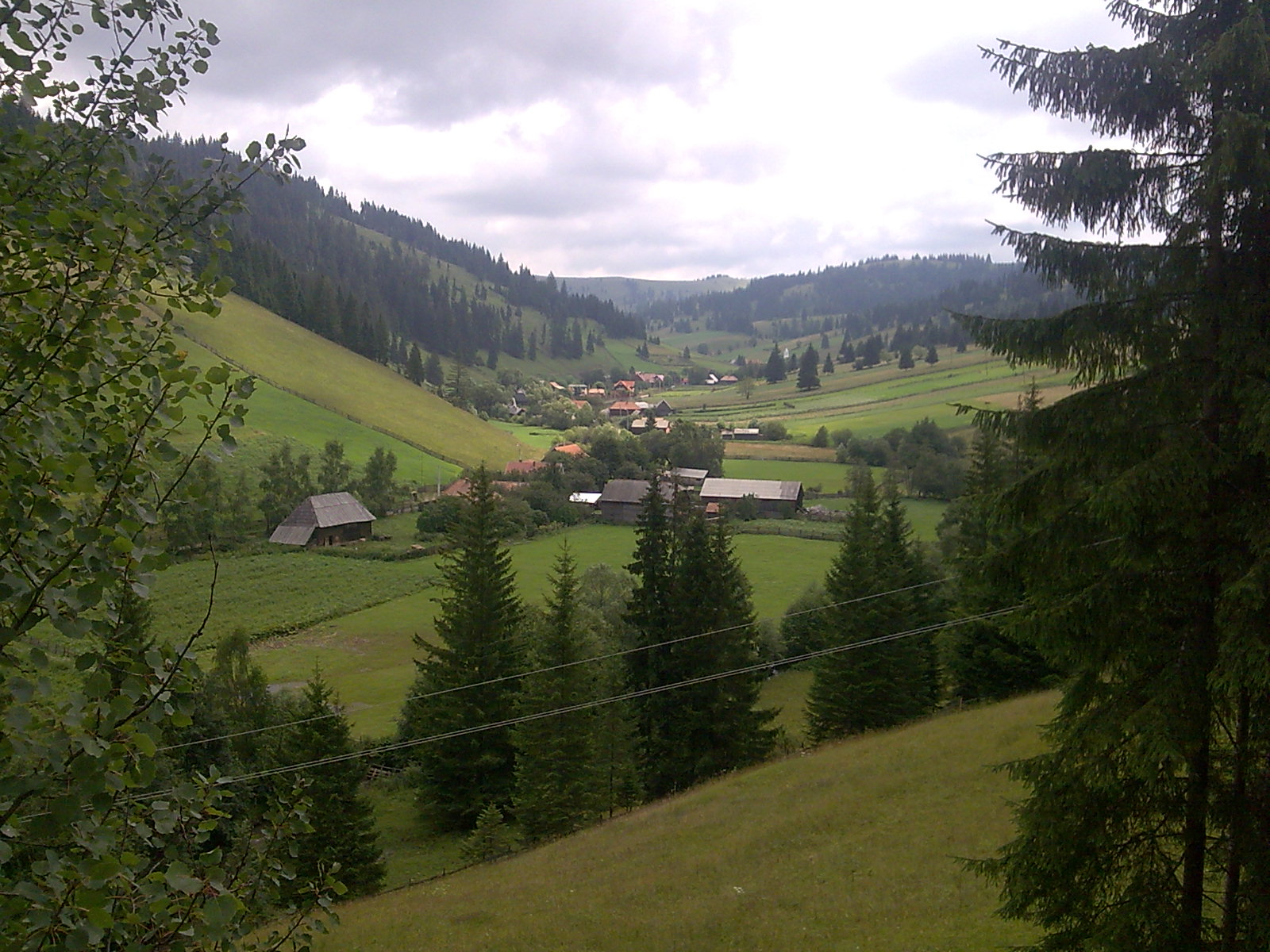
View of Făgețel (Bükkloka)

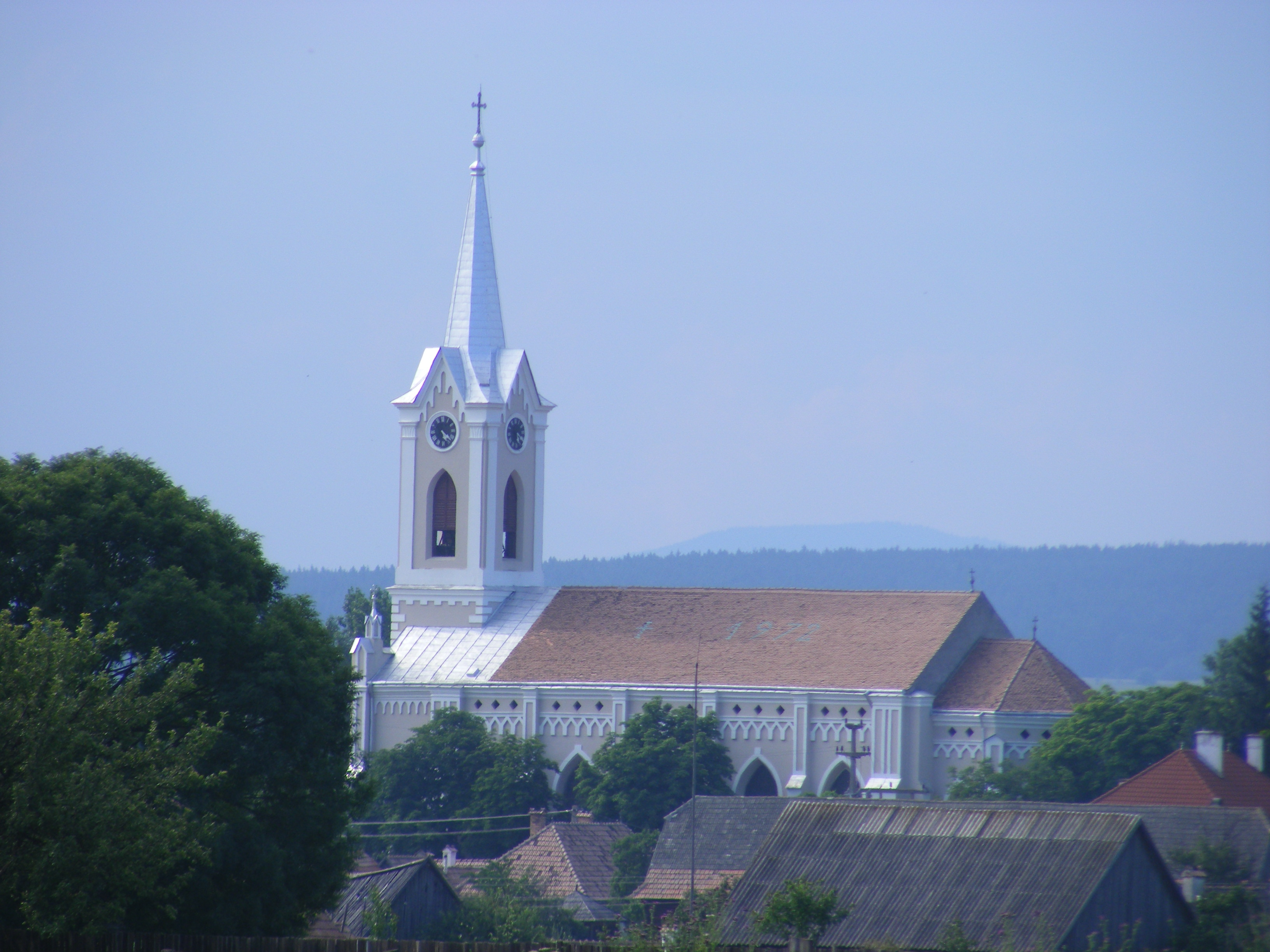
Saint Ladislaus Church
