= Balta Albă, Buzău =

Balta Albă
- Commune
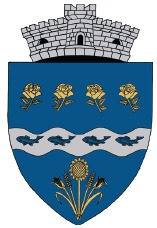
- Coat of arms

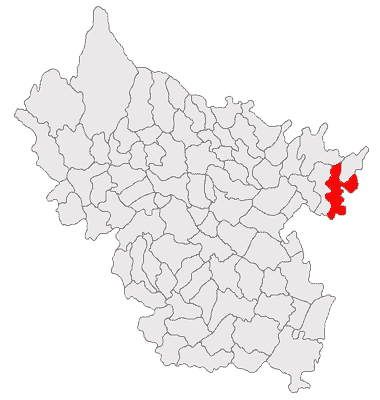
- Location in Buzău County

- Location in Romania
- Coordinates: 45°18′N 27°17′E
- Country: Romania
- County: Buzău
- Subdivisions: Amara, Balta Albă, Băile, Stăvărăști

Government
  - Mayor (2020–2024): Ionel Marin (PSD)
- Area: 64.59 km^{2} (24.94 sq mi)
- Elevation: 31 m (102 ft)
- Population (2021-12-01): 2,100
  - Density: 33/km^{2} (84/sq mi)
- Time zone: EET/EEST (UTC+2/+3)
- Postal code: 127015
- Area code: +(40) 238
- Vehicle reg.: BZ
- Website: www.baltaalba.ro

Balta Albă is a commune in Buzău County, Muntenia, Romania. It is composed of four villages: Amara, Balta Albă, Băile, and Stăvărăști.

Situated in the Bărăgan Plain, at an altitude of 31 m (102 ft), the commune lies on the banks of the river Bold, which flows towards nearby Lake Balta Albă. It is located at the eastern edge of Buzău County, 23 km (14 mi) southeast of the city of Râmnicu Sărat and 56 km (35 mi) northeast of the county seat, Buzău, on the border with Brăila County. National road DN22 passes through the northern side of Balta Albă, connecting it to Râmnicu Sărat and to Brăila.

Historical population
Year	Pop.	±%
2002	3,123	—
2011	2,590	−17.1%
2021	2,100	−18.9%
Source: Census data

== Natives ==
- Nicolae Vișan (1956–2017), ice hockey player
