= Bold (river) =

- Location within Romania

Location
- Country: Romania
- Counties: Buzău, Brăila
- Villages: Boldu, Balta Albă

Physical characteristics
- Mouth: Buzău
  - coordinates: 45.4485°N 27.7515°E
- Length: 34 km (21 mi)
- Basin size: 210 km^{2} (81 sq mi)

Basin features
- Progression: Buzău→ Siret→ Danube→ Black Sea
- Tributaries
  - left: Ciulnița

The Bold is a left tributary of the river Buzău in Romania. It discharges into the Buzău in Racovița. Its length is 34 km (21 mi) and its basin size is 210 km^{2} (81 sq mi). It flows through Lake Balta Albă.
