= Constantin Obreja =

Romanian bobsledder

Personal information
- Nationality: Romanian
- Born: 20 November 1955 (age 69)

Sport
- Sport: Bobsleigh

Constantin Obreja (born 20 November 1955) is a Romanian bobsledder. He competed in the two man and the four man events at the 1980 Winter Olympics.
