= Vasile Coroș =

Romanian speed skater

Personal information
- Nationality: Romanian
- Born: 14 June 1951 (age 75) Târgu Mureș, Romania

Sport
- Sport: Speed skating

Vasile Coroș (born 14 June 1951) is a Romanian speed skater. He competed in two events at the 1980 Winter Olympics.
