= Doru Tureanu =

Romanian ice hockey player

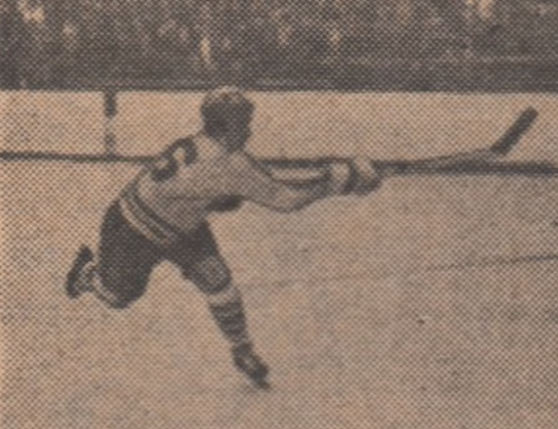
- Born: 11 January 1954; Bucharest, Romania
- Died: 11 March 2014 (aged 60); Bucharest, Romania
- Height: 5 ft 10 in (178 cm)
- Weight: 181 lb (82 kg; 12 st 13 lb)
- Position: Centre
- Played for: Dinamo Bucuresti
- National team: Romania
- NHL draft: Undrafted
- Playing career: 1969–1987

Doru Tureanu (11 January 1954 – 11 March 2014) was a Romanian ice hockey player. He played internationally for the Romania men's national ice hockey team, and was inducted into the IIHF Hall of Fame.

== Career ==
Tureanu spent his entire career in his hometown, playing for Dinamo Bucuresti in the Romanian Hockey League from 1970 to 1987. With his team, he won the national championship six times, in 1971, 1972, 1973, 1976, 1979 and 1981. Both with Dinamo and the Romanian national team, he played on a forward line with Marian Costea and Dumitru Axinte.

For the Romanian national team, he participated in the Group A World Championships in 1977, the Group B World Championships in 1972, 1973, 1974, 1975, 1976, 1978, 1979, 1981, 1982, and 1983, and the Group C World Championships in 1971, 1985, 1986 and 1987. He played for Romania at the 1984 Thayer Tutt Trophy, which has held for nations that didn't qualify for the Olympics that year. In addition, he participated at the 1976 Winter Olympics in Innsbruck, and the 1980 Winter Olympics in Lake Placid.

At the 1976 Olympics, Tureanu scored 6 goals, and added 6 assists, in only six games. At the 1980 Olympics, he scored 5 goals and added 2 assists in five games, including a hat trick against West Germany.

In 2011, he became the second Romanian player to be inducted into the IIHF Hall of Fame. He is one of three members of the Romania national team from the 1977 World Championships to be inducted into the IIHF Hall of Fame, along with Dezső Varga and Eduard Pană.

Tureanu died at Colentina Hospital in Bucharest on March 11, 2014 at the age of 60.

== Career statistics ==
=== International ===
Year	Team	Comp	GP	G	A	Pts	PIM
1976	Romania	Olympic	6	6	6	12	23
1980	Romania	Olympic	5	5	2	7	8
Olympic Totals			11	11	8	19	31
