= Vasile Morar =

Romanian ice hockey player

- Born: June 23, 1952
- Died: June 15, 2005 (aged 52)
- Height: 5 ft 9 in (175 cm)
- Weight: 172 lb (78 kg; 12 st 4 lb)
- Position: Goaltender
- Played for: Steaua București, Dunărea Galați, Dinamo bucurești
- National team: Romania
- NHL draft: Undrafted
- Playing career: 1968–1984

Vasile Morar (July 23, 1952 – June 15, 2005) was a Romanian ice hockey goaltender. He played for the Romania men's national ice hockey team at the 1976 Winter Olympics in Innsbruck.
