= Andrei Erdely =

Romanian speed skater

Personal information
- Nationality: Romanian
- Born: 2 June 1955 (age 69); Cluj-Napoca, Romania

Sport
- Sport: Speed skating

Andrei Erdely (born 2 June 1955) is a Romanian speed skater. He competed in two events at the 1980 Winter Olympics.
