= Ioan Gheorghiu =

Romanian ice hockey player

- Born: March 5, 1947 (age 79) Bucharest, Romania
- Height: 5 ft 9 in (175 cm)
- Weight: 146 lb (66 kg; 10 st 6 lb)
- Position: Forward
- National team: Romania
- NHL draft: Undrafted
- Playing career: 1968–1976

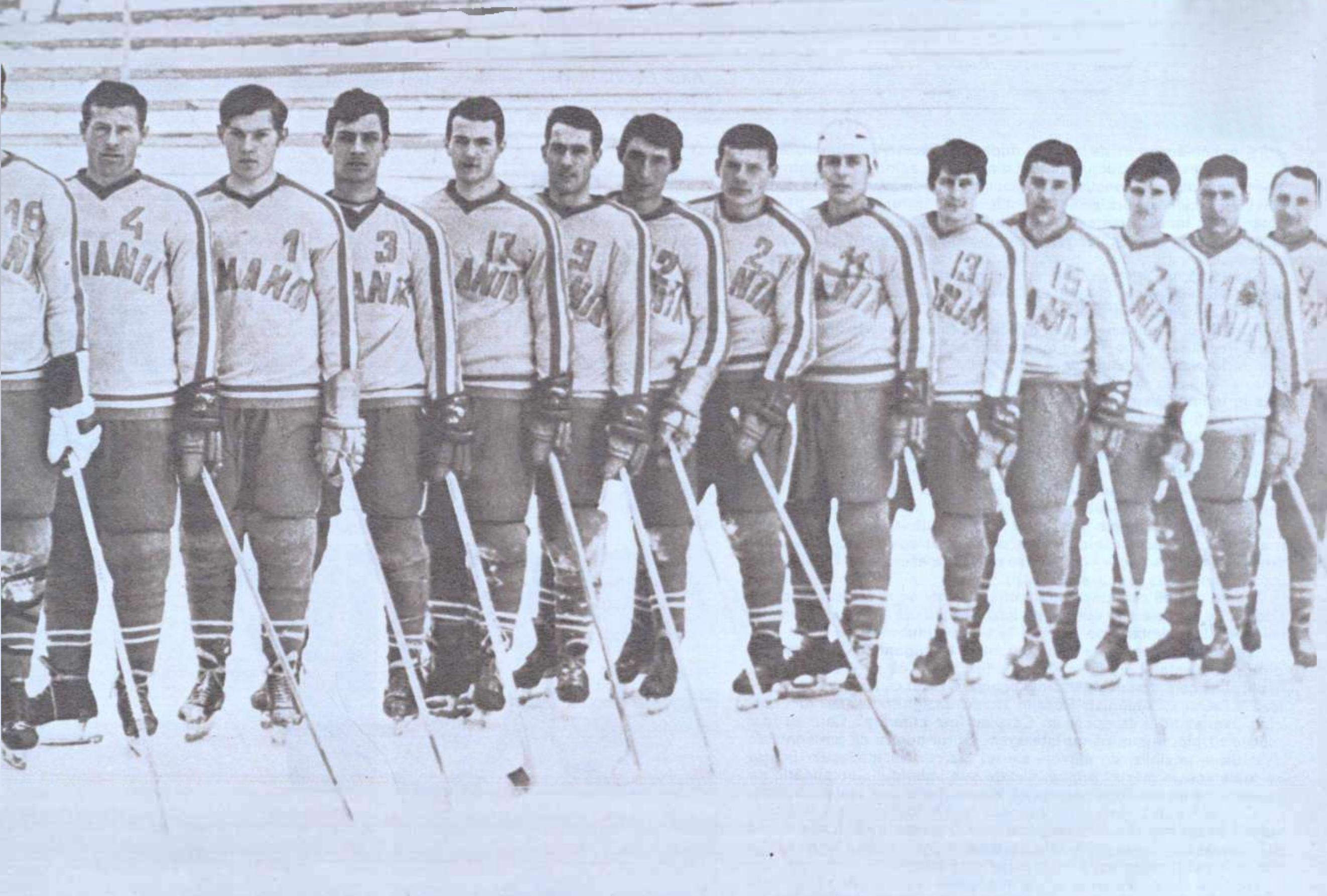
Romania's national ice hockey team before the world championship — group B. Dezideriu Varga, Aurel Moiș, Ion Ioniță, Iulian Florescu, Ion Bașa, Valentin Ștefanov, Tiberiu Pop, Alexandru Calamar, Ion Gheorghiu, Eduard Pană, Gheorghe Huțanu, Dumitru Paraschiv, Géza Szabo

Ioan Gheorghiu (born March 5, 1947) is a former Romanian ice hockey player. He played for the Romania men's national ice hockey team at the 1968 Winter Olympics in Grenoble, and the 1976 Winter Olympics in Innsbruck.
