= Dezideriu Jenei =

Romanian speed skater

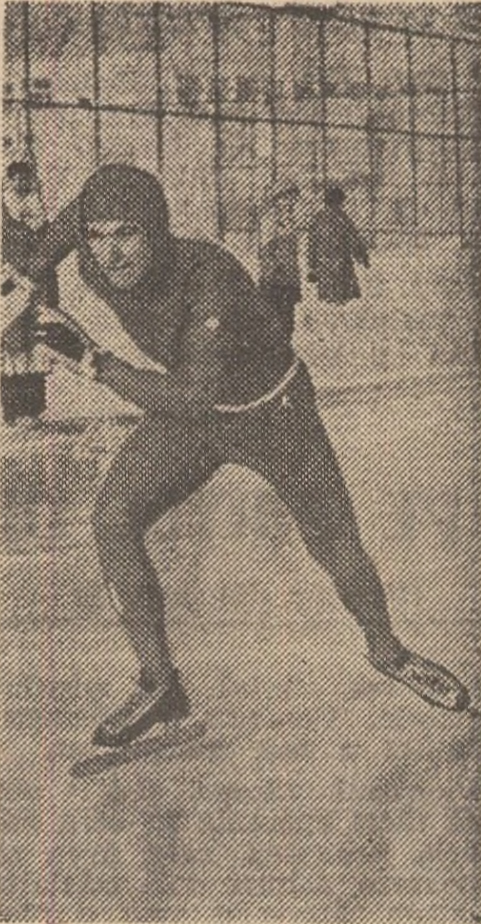
- Jenei in 1981

Personal information
- Nationality: Romanian
- Born: 25 June 1960 (age 66) Cluj-Napoca, Romania

Sport
- Sport: Speed skating

Dezideriu Jenei (born 25 June 1960) is a Romanian speed skater. He competed at the 1980 Winter Olympics and the 1984 Winter Olympics.
