= Constantin Iancu (bobsleigh) =

Romanian bobsledder

Personal information
- Nationality: Romanian
- Born: 17 September 1948 (age 76)

Sport
- Sport: Bobsleigh

Constantin Iancu (born 17 September 1948) is a Romanian bobsledder. He competed in the two man and the four man events at the 1980 Winter Olympics.
