= Vasile Huțanu =

Romanian ice hockey player

- Born: 1 June 1954
- Died: 24 February 2014 (aged 59); Bucharest, Romania
- Height: 5 ft 9 in (175 cm)
- Weight: 187 lb (85 kg; 13 st 5 lb)
- Position: Center
- National team: Romania
- NHL draft: Undrafted
- Playing career: 1975–1979

Vasile Huţanu (1 June 1954 – 24 February 2014) was a Romanian ice hockey player. He played for the Romania men's national ice hockey team at the 1976 Winter Olympics in Innsbruck.
