= Tiberiu Mikloș =

Romanian ice hockey player

- Born: April 2, 1954 (age 71) Miercurea-Ciuc, Romania
- National team: Romania
- NHL draft: Undrafted

Tibor-Karoly Miklos (born April 2, 1954) is a former Romanian ice hockey player. He played for the Romania men's national ice hockey team at the 1976 Winter Olympics in Innsbruck.
