= Eduard Pană =

Romanian ice hockey player

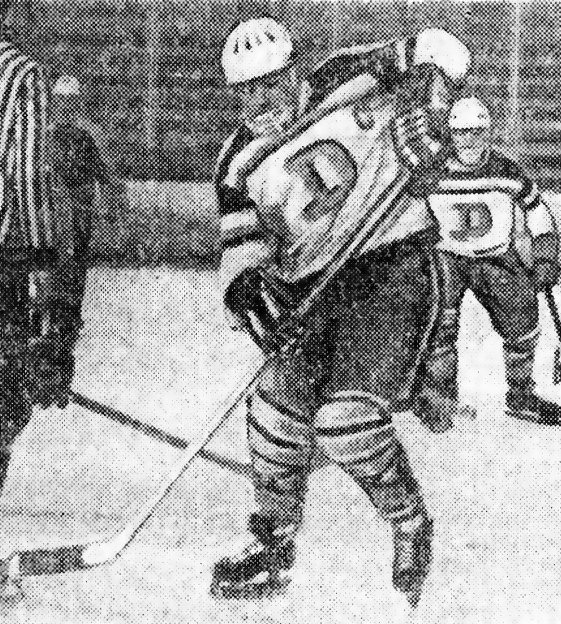
- Born: May 28, 1944 (age 80); Brănești, Romania
- Height: 5 ft 8 in (173 cm)
- Weight: 163 lb (74 kg; 11 st 9 lb)
- Position: Right wing
- Shot: Left
- Played for: CS Dinamo Bucharest
- National team: Romania
- Playing career: 1962–1979

Eduard Pană (born 28 May 1944 in Brăneşti) is a retired Romanian ice hockey player. For some years, he was the secretary-general of the Romanian Ice Hockey Federation.

Pană was one of the best players in Europe during the 1970s. He participated in three Winter Olympics. He was inducted into the International Ice Hockey Federation Hall of Fame in 1998. He is one of three members of the Romania national team from the 1977 World Championships to be inducted into the IIHF Hall of Fame, along with Dezső Varga and Doru Tureanu.
