= István Antal (ice hockey) =

Romanian ice hockey player (1958–2009)

Istvan Antal
- Born: September 18, 1958; Frumoasa, Romania
- Died: January 9, 2009 (aged 50)
- Position: Defence
- National team: Romania
- NHL draft: Undrafted
- Playing career: 1979–1980

Istvan Antal (September 18, 1958 – January 9, 2009) was a Romanian ice hockey player. Born in Frumoasa, Romania, he played for the Romania men's national ice hockey team at the 1980 Winter Olympics in Lake Placid.
