= László Sólyom (ice hockey) =

Romanian ice hockey player

- Born: November 29, 1955 (age 69); Gheorgheni, Romania
- Height: 5 ft 11 in (180 cm)
- Weight: 183 lb (83 kg; 13 st 1 lb)
- Position: Center
- National team: Romania
- NHL draft: Undrafted
- Playing career: 1976–1989

Lászlo Sólyom (born November 29, 1955) is an ethnic Hungarian former ice hockey player in Romania who played center. He played for the Romania men's national ice hockey team at the 1980 Winter Olympics in Lake Placid.
