= George Justinian =

Romanian ice hockey player (born 1954)

- Born: January 24, 1954 (age 72) Bucharest, Romania
- Position: Defence
- National team: Romania
- NHL draft: Undrafted

Gheorghe Justinian, Ion Ioniță, Panini 1979

George Justinian (born January 24, 1954) is a former Romanian ice hockey player. He played for the Romania men's national ice hockey team at the 1976 Winter Olympics in Innsbruck, and the 1980 Winter Olympics in Lake Placid.
