= Béla Nagy (ice hockey) =

Romanian ice hockey player

Bela Nagy
- Born: December 18, 1957 (age 68) Miercurea Ciuc, Romania
- Height: 5 ft 10 in (178 cm)
- Weight: 161 lb (73 kg; 11 st 7 lb)
- Position: Right wing
- National team: Romania
- NHL draft: Undrafted
- Playing career: 1978–1980

Bela Nagy (born December 18, 1957) is a former Romanian ice hockey player. He played for the Romania men's national ice hockey team at the 1980 Winter Olympics in Lake Placid.
