= Ion Berdilă =

Romanian ice hockey player

- Born: February 1, 1958 (age 67)
- National team: Romania
- NHL draft: Undrafted

Ion Berdilă (born February 1, 1958) is a former Romanian ice hockey player. He played for the Romania men's national ice hockey team at the 1980 Winter Olympics in Lake Placid.
