= Mihail Popescu =

Romanian ice hockey player (1960–2021)

- Born: November 11, 1960
- Died: 31 January 2021 (aged 60) Bucharest, Romania
- Height: 6 ft 0 in (183 cm)
- Weight: 203 lb (92 kg; 14 st 7 lb)
- Position: Defence
- Shot: Left
- Played for: CSA Steaua București
- National team: Romania
- NHL draft: Undrafted
- Playing career: 1976–1991

Lucian "Mihail" Popescu (11 November 1960 — 31 January 2021) was a Romanian ice hockey player. He played for CSA Steaua București between 1976 and 1991. Internationally Popescu played for the Romanian national team at five World Championships (the B Pool in 1979, 1981, and 1983; the D Pool in 1989 and 1990), and at the 1980 Winter Olympics in Lake Placid. He later coached the Romanian under-18 team. He died on 31 January 2021 in Bucharest at the age of 60.
