= Alexandru Hălăucă =

Romanian ice hockey player

- Born: August 12, 1957 (age 68)
- Height: 6 ft 0 in (183 cm)
- Weight: 183 lb (83 kg; 13 st 1 lb)
- Position: Centre
- Shot: Right
- National team: Romania
- NHL draft: Undrafted
- Playing career: 1975–1994

Alexandru Hălăucă (born August 12, 1957) is a former Romanian ice hockey player. He played for the Romania men's national ice hockey team at the 1976 Winter Olympics in Innsbruck, and the 1980 Winter Olympics in Lake Placid.
