= Marian Pisaru =

Romanian ice hockey player

- Born: January 4, 1954 (age 71)
- Height: 5 ft 7 in (170 cm)
- Weight: 150 lb (68 kg; 10 st 10 lb)
- Position: Left wing
- National team: Romania
- NHL draft: Undrafted
- Playing career: 1975–1980

Marian Pisaru (born January 4, 1954) is a former Romanian ice hockey player. He played for the Romania men's national ice hockey team at the 1976 Winter Olympics in Innsbruck, and the 1980 Winter Olympics in Lake Placid.

Including participation at the 76/80 Olympics, Marian Pisaru was part of the Romanian team which played in the A-group of the World Championships in 1977, where the Romanian team was relegated despite defeating USA 5-4. This game is widely regarded as Romania's finest hour on the international ice hockey scene.
