= Marian Costea =

Romanian ice hockey player (1952–2024)

- Born: 13 June 1952; Bucharest, Romania
- Died: 10 April 2024 (aged 71)
- Height: 5 ft 6 in (168 cm)
- Weight: 157 lb (71 kg; 11 st 3 lb)
- Position: Right wing
- Played for: Dinamo București
- National team: Romania
- NHL draft: Undrafted
- Playing career: 1971–1981

Marian Costea (13 June 1952 – 10 April 2024) was a Romanian ice hockey player. He played for the Romanian national team at the 1976 Winter Olympics in Innsbruck, and the 1980 Winter Olympics in Lake Placid. Costea died on 10 April 2024, at the age of 71.
