= Cazacu Cazan =

Romanian ice hockey player

- Born: October 22, 1958 (age 66); Bucharest, Romania
- Height: 5 ft 10 in (178 cm)
- Weight: 168 lb (76 kg; 12 st 0 lb)
- Position: Left wing
- National team: Romania
- NHL draft: Undrafted
- Playing career: 1979–1997

Traian "Cazacu" Cazan (born October 22, 1958) is a Romanian former ice hockey player. He played for the Romania men's national ice hockey team at the 1980 Winter Olympics in Lake Placid.
