= Adrian Olenici =

Romanian ice hockey player

- Born: April 19, 1956 (age 70)
- Played for: Steaua București
- National team: Romania
- NHL draft: Undrafted
- Playing career: 1976–1980

Adrian Olenici (born April 19, 1956) is a former Romanian ice hockey player. He played for the Romania men's national ice hockey team at the 1980 Winter Olympics in Lake Placid.
