= Dumitru Axinte =

Romanian ice hockey player (born 1952)

- Born: May 9, 1952 (age 73); Bucharest, Romania
- Position: Left wing
- Played for: Dinamo Bucuresti
- National team: Romania
- NHL draft: Undrafted
- Playing career: 1971–1983

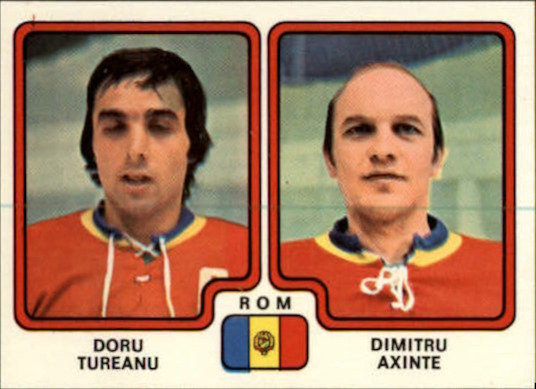

Dumitru Axinte (born May 9, 1952) is a former Romanian ice hockey player. He played for the Romanian national team at the 1976 Winter Olympics in Innsbruck, and the 1980 Winter Olympics in Lake Placid.
