= Elöd Antal =

Romanian ice hockey player (born 1955)

Elöd Gergely Antal (born March 11, 1955, in Sâncrăieni, Romania) is a retired Romanian ice hockey player. He played for the Romanian team at the 1976 and 1980 Winter Olympics.
