= Șandor Gal =

Romanian ice hockey player

- Born: November 23, 1955 (age 69); Miercurea Ciuc, Romania
- Played for: SC Miercurea Ciuc
- National team: Romania
- NHL draft: Undrafted
- Playing career: 1974–1987

Şandor Gal (born November 23, 1955) is a former Romanian ice hockey player. He played for the Romania men's national ice hockey team at the 1976 Winter Olympics in Innsbruck, and the 1980 Winter Olympics in Lake Placid.
