= Doru Moroșan =

Romanian ice hockey player

- Born: 13 May 1953 (age 71)
- Position: Defence
- National team: Romania
- NHL draft: Undrafted
- Playing career: 1975–1980

Iosif "Doru" Moroșan (born May 13, 1953) is a former Romanian ice hockey player. He played for the Romania men's national ice hockey team at the 1976 Winter Olympics in Innsbruck, and the 1980 Winter Olympics in Lake Placid.
