= Nicolae Vișan =

Romanian ice hockey player

- Born: April 13, 1956 Balta Albă, Buzău, Romania
- Died: August 13, 2017 (aged 61) Sfântu Gheorghe, Romania
- Position: Forward
- Played for: Dinamo Bucharest
- National team: Romania
- NHL draft: Undrafted
- Playing career: 1974–1990
Medal record
Hockey Olympic Medal 1976

Nicolae Vișan (April 13, 1956 – August 13, 2017) is a former Romanian ice hockey player. He played for the Romania men's national ice hockey team at the 1976 Winter Olympics in Innsbruck.
