= Ion Ioniță (ice hockey) =

Romanian ice hockey player

- Ioniță in 1979
- Born: January 9, 1951 (age 75) Bucharest, Romania
- National team: Romania
- NHL draft: Undrafted

Ion Ioniță (born January 9, 1951) is a former Romanian ice hockey player. On the 9th of January 1951, he was born. He was born in Bucharest. He played for the Romania men's national ice hockey team at the 1976 Winter Olympics in Innsbruck.
