= Constantin Nistor (ice hockey) =

Romanian ice hockey player

- Born: May 22, 1954 (age 71)
- Height: 5 ft 9 in (175 cm)
- Weight: 170 lb (77 kg; 12 st 2 lb)
- Position: Right wing
- National team: Romania
- NHL draft: Undrafted

Vasile "Constantin" Nistor (born May 22, 1954 in Radauti - Suceava) is a Romanian former ice hockey winger. He played for the Romania men's national ice hockey team at the 1980 Winter Olympics in Lake Placid.
