= CS Dinamo București (ice hockey) =

Dinamo București
- City: Bucharest, Romania
- League: Romanian Hockey League
- Founded: 1948

Dinamo București was an ice hockey club in Bucharest, Romania. They participated in the Romanian Hockey League, the top level Romanian ice hockey league.

The club was founded in 1948 as a member of the CS Dinamo București sports club. The team was dissolved in 2005 due to lack of funds.

== Honours ==
- Romanian Hockey League champion (7) :
  - 1968, 1971, 1972, 1973, 1976, 1979, 1981
- Vice-champion (9) :
  - 1967, 1969, 1970, 1974, 1975, 1978, 1980, 1982, 1988.

== Notable former players ==
- Eduard Pană
- Doru Tureanu
- Ion Țiriac

== Gallery ==
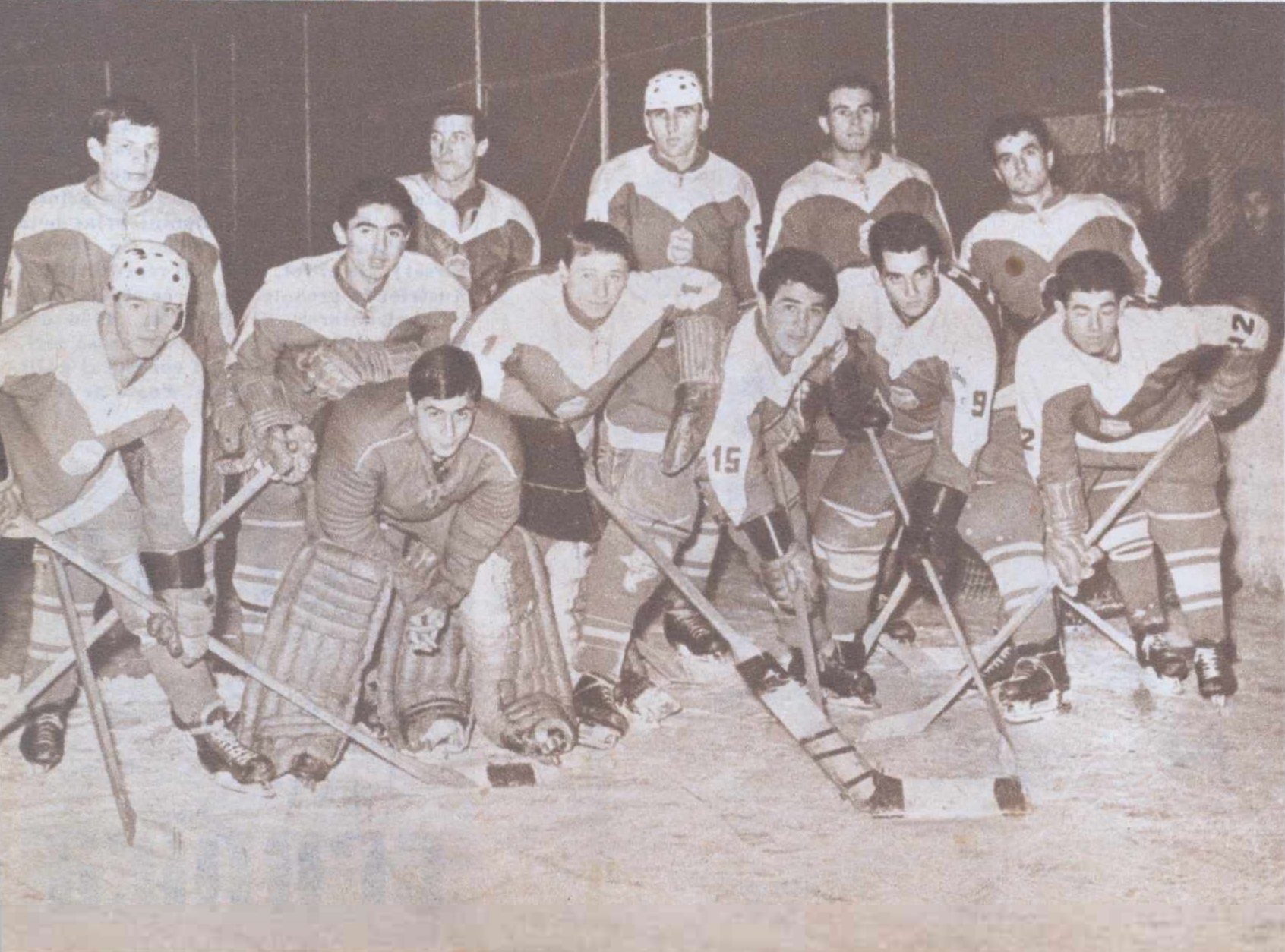
Dinamo squad in 1964 (with Ion Țiriac back row, center)

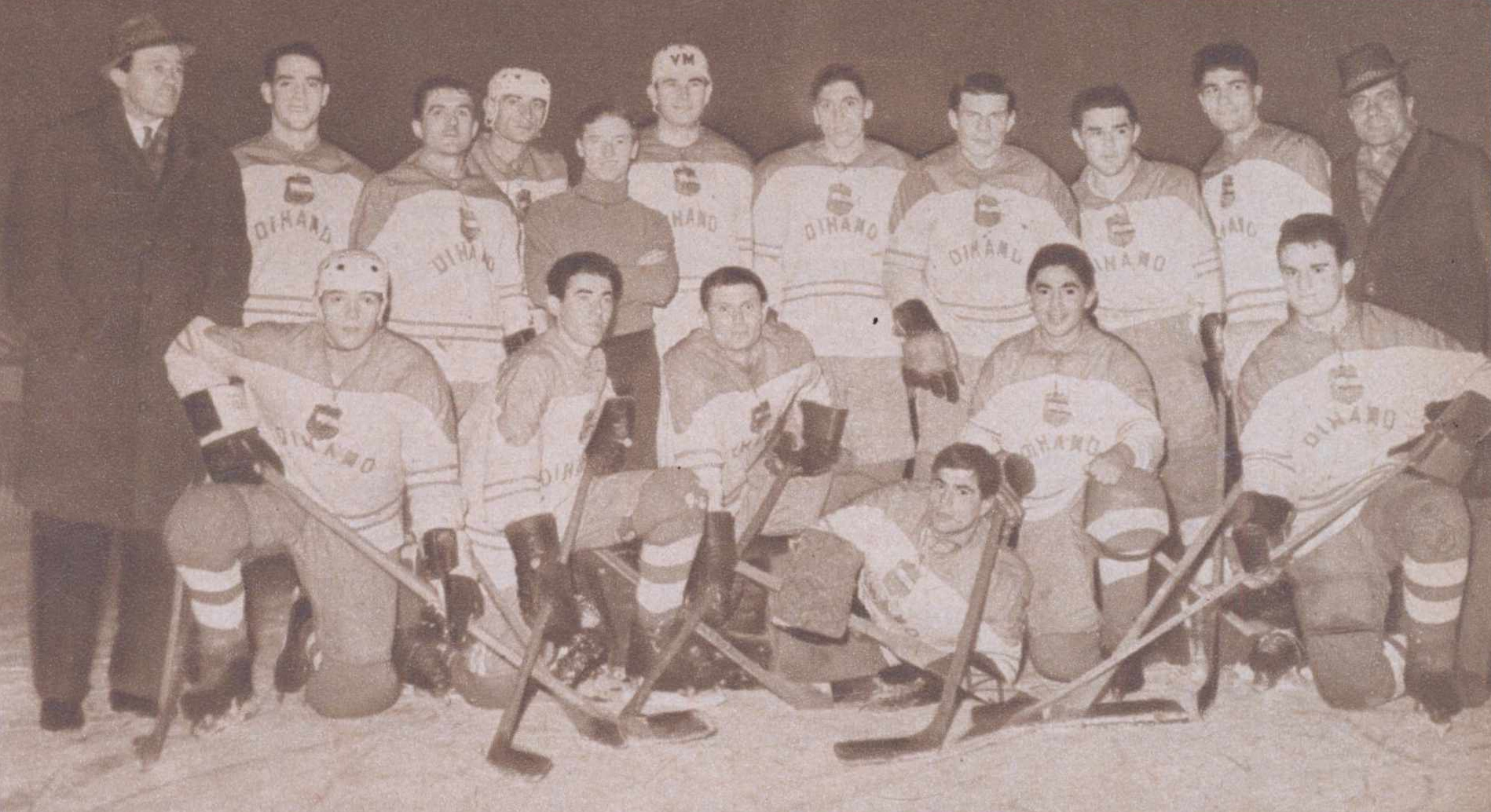
Dinamo squad in 1966 (coached by Mihai Flamaropol)
