= Zoltán Nagy (ice hockey) =

Romanian ice hockey player

Zoltan Nagy
- Born: August 19, 1955 (age 70); Miercurea-Ciuc, Romania
- Height: 5 ft 10 in (178 cm)
- Weight: 165 lb (75 kg; 11 st 11 lb)
- Position: Left Wing
- National team: Romania
- NHL draft: Undrafted
- Playing career: 1978–1980

Istvan "Zoltan" Nagy (born August 19, 1955) is a Romanian former ice hockey winger. He played for the Romania men's national ice hockey team at the 1980 Winter Olympics in Lake Placid.
