= Romania men's national ice hockey team =

Romania
- Nickname: Tricolori (Three Colors)
- Association: Romanian Ice Hockey Federation
- Head coach: Ron Pasco
- Assistants: Robert Peter; Levente Zsók
- Captain: Zsombor Molnár
- Most games: Doru Tureanu (113)
- Top scorer: Doru Tureanu (74)
- Most points: Doru Tureanu (112)
- Team colors
- IIHF code: ROU

Ranking
- Current IIHF: NR (3 June 2026)
- Highest IIHF: 21 (2025)
- Lowest IIHF: 29 (2016–18)

First international
- United States 15–0 Romania (Krynica, Poland; 2 February 1931)

Biggest win
- Romania 52–1 New Zealand (Geel or Heist-op-den-Berg, Belgium; 19 March 1989)

Biggest defeat
- Czechoslovakia 23–1 Romania (Prague, Czechoslovakia; 17 February 1947)

Olympics
- Appearances: 4 (first in 1964)

IIHF World Championships
- Appearances: 57 (first in 1931)
- Best result: 7th (1947)

International record (W–L–T)
- 344–399–56

The Romanian men's national ice hockey team is the national men's ice hockey of Romania, and a member of the International Ice Hockey Federation. They are currently ranked 22nd in the 2026 IIHF World Rankings and currently compete in Division IA. They have competed in four Olympic ice hockey competitions, the most recent being in 1980.

== Olympic Games ==
Romania started Olympic hockey in 1964 in the B division. In the tournament, the team finished 12th out of 16 teams and managed 3 wins against Austria, Italy, and Hungary also with a tie against Yugoslavia.

In 1968, Romania lost its qualification match against West Germany 7–0 and was forced to compete in the B division again. In the first two games, Romania beat Austria 3–2 and the Host, France 7–3. They lost their next three games and finished 12th out of 14 in the standings.

After skipping the 1972 competition, Romania returned for the 1976 tournament. This time Romania played Poland in the Qualification round and lost 7–4, keeping them in the B division once again. However, Romania battled back and won 4 of 5 games with only one loss against Yugoslavia, still winning the division. The team finished 7th out of 12.

In 1980, Romania was able to play with the top teams and was put into the Blue Division group, along with tough opponents such as Sweden, Czechoslovakia, and USA. In the first game Romania was down 4–2 to West Germany, but managed to score 4 goals to beat the former bronze medallists 6–4. In their next game Romania got shut out by Sweden 8–0. The Swedes scored 3 goals in the first period which left Romania out of it. After a lopsided loss to Czechoslovakia (7–2) the team then took on USA. The US jumped out to a 2–0 lead in the first period and added two more to it to lead 4–1 after two periods. Unlike other teams that the US had faced, the Romanians fought strong in the third period, despite being outshot 15–3, and scored a goal. The final score was 7–2. Romania played Norway for their final game, who had lost all four of their past games and had no chance to advance to the Medal Round. Romania fell behind less than a minute into the game, but stormed back to take the lead 3–1 in the third period. The Norwegian team battled back though, and scored once with a minute and a half left to play, and scored once more to tie it with only 29 seconds left. This tie still gave Romania one point but they had been hoping for a win. They finished the tournament with a 1–3–1 record, and were ranked 8th out of 12, just beating the Netherlands, West Germany, Norway, and Japan. This was the last time that the Romanians competed in the Olympic tournaments.

== Tournament record ==
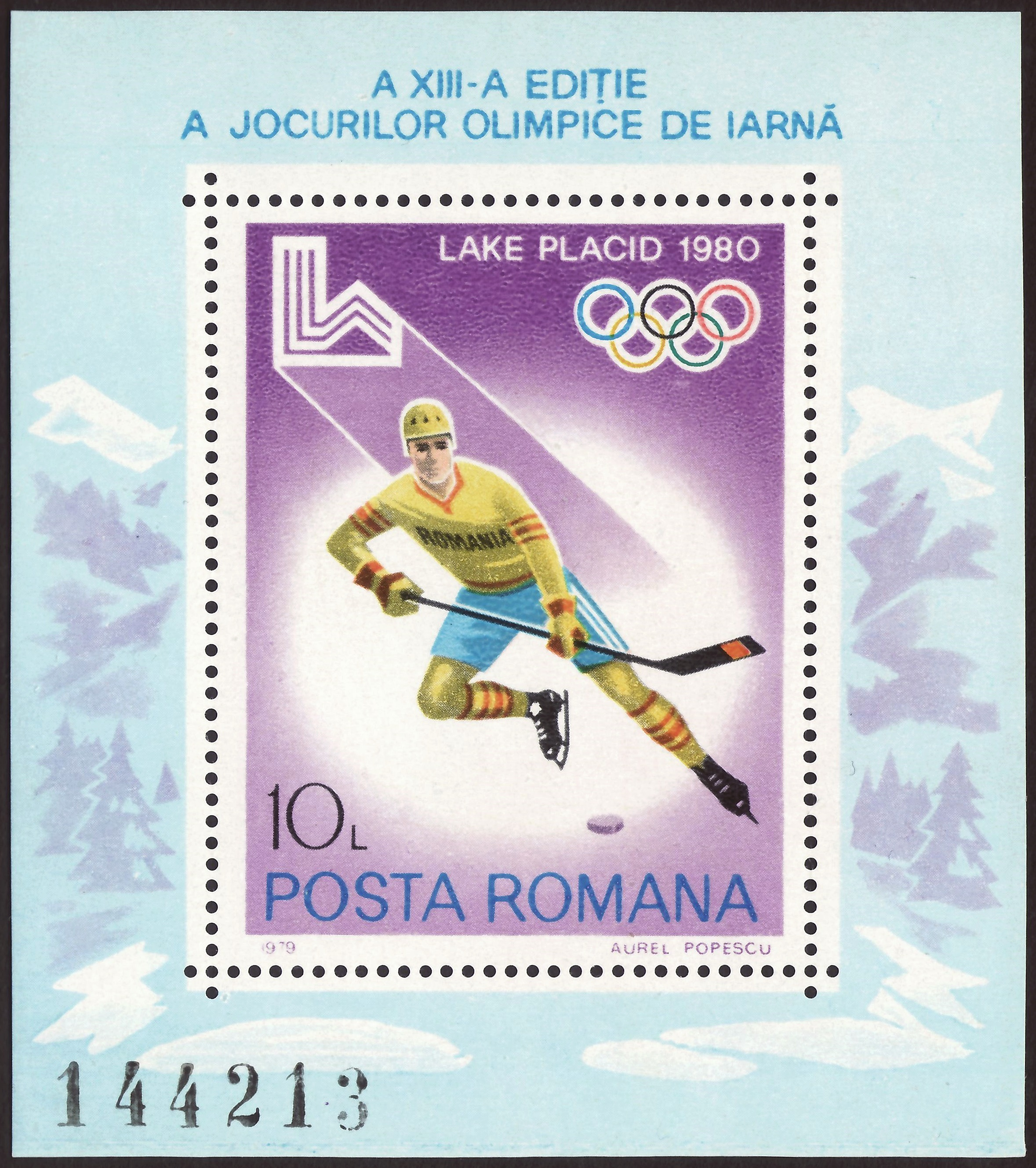
Postage stamp from Romania, 1980 Winter Olympics

=== Olympic record ===
Games	GP	W	OW	T	OL	L	GF	GA	Coach	Captain	Finish	Rank
(Austria) 1964 Innsbruck	7	3	0	1	0	3	31	28	-	-	Consolation round (Group B)	12th
(France) 1968 Grenoble	5	2	0	0	0	3	22	23	-	-	Consolation round (Group B)	12th
(Japan) 1972 Sapporo	Did not qualify											
(Austria) 1976 Innsbruck	5	4	0	0	0	1	23	15	-	-	Consolation round	7th
(United States) 1980 Lake Placid	5	1	0	1	0	3	13	29	-	-	First round	8th
(Socialist Federal Republic of Yugoslavia) 1984 Sarajevo	Did not qualify											
(Canada) 1988 Calgary	Did not qualify											
(France) 1992 Albertville	Did not qualify											
(Norway) 1994 Lillehammer	Did not qualify											
(Japan) 1998 Nagano	Did not qualify											
(United States) 2002 Salt Lake City	Did not qualify											
(Italy) 2006 Turin	Did not qualify											
(Canada) 2010 Vancouver	Did not qualify											
(Russia) 2014 Sochi	Did not qualify											
(South Korea) 2018 Pyeongchang	Did not qualify											
(China) 2022 Beijing	Did not qualify											
(Italy) 2026 Milan-Cortina	Did not qualify											
(France) 2030 French Alps	Future event											

=== World Championship ===
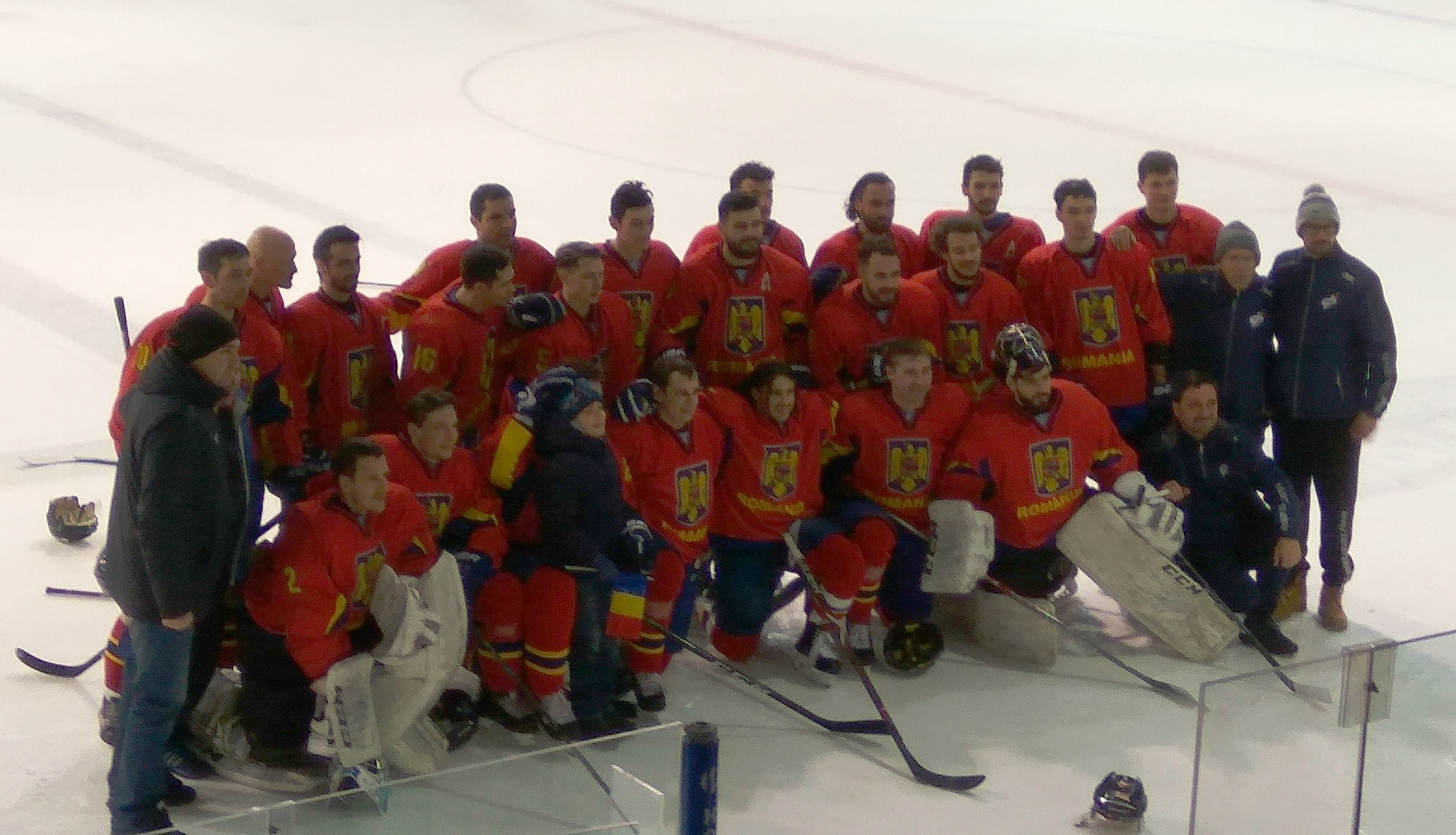
Romanian national team in 2019

- 1931 – 10th place
- 1933 – 9th place
- 1934 – 10th place
- 1935 – 11th place
- 1937 – 10th place
- 1938 – 13th place
- 1947 – 7th place
- 1959 – 13th place (1st in Pool B)
- 1961 – 15th place (1st in Pool C)
- 1963 – 11th place (3rd in Pool B)
- 1966 – 10th place (2nd in Pool B)
- 1967 – 10th place (2nd in Pool B)
- 1969 – 12th place (6th in Pool B)
- 1970 – 13th place (7th in Pool B)
- 1971 – 15th place (1st in Pool C)
- 1972 – 10th place (4th in Pool B)
- 1973 – 10th place (4th in Pool B)
- 1974 – 12th place (6th in Pool B)
- 1975 – 11th place (5th in Pool B)
- 1976 – 9th place (1st in Pool B)
- 1977 – 8th place
- 1978 – 12th place (4th in Pool B)
- 1979 – 11th place (3rd in Pool B)
- 1981 – 13th place (5th in Pool B)
- 1982 – 13th place (5th in Pool B)
- 1983 – 15th place (7th in Pool B)
- 1985 – 20th place (4th in Pool C)
- 1986 – 20th place (4th in Pool C)
- 1987 – 19th place (3rd in Pool C)
- 1989 – 26th place (2nd in Pool D)

Division	Championship	Coach	Captain	Finish	Rank
C	(Hungary) 1990 Budapest	–	–	Group stage	4th in Group C
C	(Denmark) 1991 Brøndby	–	–	Promoted ▲	3rd in Group C
B	(Austria) 1992 Klagenfurt	–	–	Group stage	6th in Group B
B	(Netherlands) 1993 Eindhoven	–	–	Group stage	6th in Group B
B	(Denmark) 1994 Copenhagen	–	–	Group stage	7th in Group B
B	(Slovakia) 1995 Bratislava	–	–	relegated ▼	8th in Group B
C	(Slovenia) 1996 Jesenice	–	–	Group stage	6th in Group C
C	(Estonia) 1997 Tallinn	–	–	Consolation	25th
C	(Hungary) 1998 Budapest	–	–	Final Round	26th
C	(Netherlands) 1999 Eindhoven	–	–	Final Round	26th
C	(China) 2000 Beijing	–	–	Consolation	30th
Division II	(Romania) 2001 Bucharest	–	–	Promoted ▲	1st in Group B
Division I	(Hungary) 2002 Székesfehérvár	–	–	Group stage	5th in Group B
Division I	(Hungary) 2003 Budapest	–	–	Group stage	5th in Group A
Division I	(Poland) 2004 Gdańsk	–	–	Group stage	5th in Group B
Division I	(Netherlands) 2005 Eindhoven	–	–	relegated ▼	6th in Group B
Division II	(Bulgaria) 2006 Sofia	–	–	Promoted ▲	1st in Group A
Division I	(Slovenia) 2007 Ljubljana	–	–	relegated ▼	6th in Group A
Division II	(Romania) 2008 Miercurea Ciuc	–	–	Promoted ▲	1st in Group A
Division I	(Poland) 2009 Toruń	–	–	Group stage ▼	6th in Group B
Division II	(Estonia) 2010 Narva	–	–	Group stage	2nd in Group B
Division II	(Croatia) 2011 Zagreb	–	–	Promoted ▲	1st in Group B
Division I	(Poland) 2012 Krynica	–	–	Group stage	4th in Group B
Division I	(Ukraine) 2013 Donetsk	–	–	Group stage	4th in Group B
Division I	(Lithuania) 2014 Vilnius	–	–	relegated ▼	6th in Group B
Division II	(Iceland) 2015 Reykjavík	–	–	Promoted ▲	1st in Group A
Division I	(Croatia) 2016 Zagreb	–	–	relegated ▼	6th in Group B
Division II	(Romania) 2017 Galați	–	–	Promoted ▲	1st in Group A
Division I	(Lithuania) 2018 Kaunas	–	–	Group stage	5th in Group B
Division I	(Estonia) 2019 Tallinn	–	–	Promoted ▲	1st in Group B
Division I	(Slovenia) 2020 Ljubljana	Cancelled due to the COVID-19 pandemic			
Division I	(Slovenia) 2021 Ljubljana	Cancelled due to the COVID-19 pandemic			
Division I	(Slovenia) 2022 Ljubljana	–	–	Group stage	6th in Group A
Division I	(United Kingdom) 2023 Nottingham	–	–	Group stage	5th in Group A
Division I	(Italy) 2024 Bolzano	–	–	Group stage	4th in Group A
Division I	(Romania) 2025 Sfântu Gheorghe	–	–	relegated ▼	6th in Group A
Division I	(China) 2026 Shenzhen	–	–	Group stage	3rd in Group B
Division I	(Romania) 2027 Târgu Mureș	–	–		Group B

=== Winter Universiade ===
- 1966 – 2nd place (Silver medal)
- 1983 – 3rd place (Bronze medal)
Romania national team from 1979
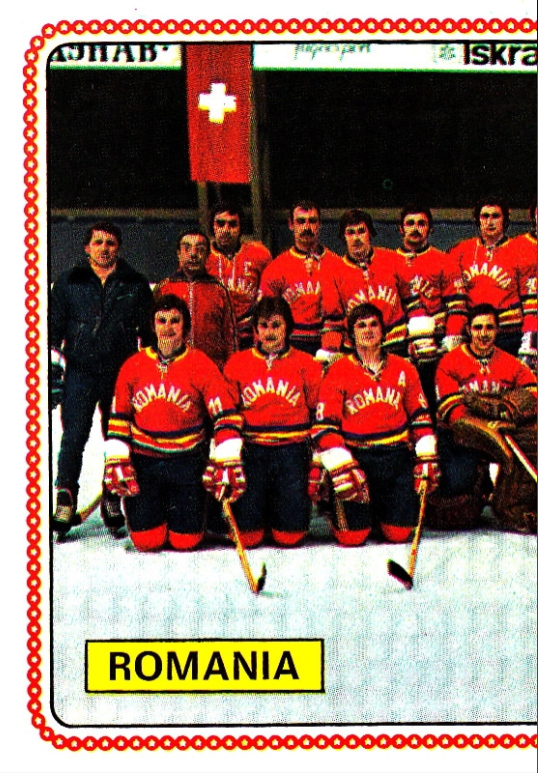

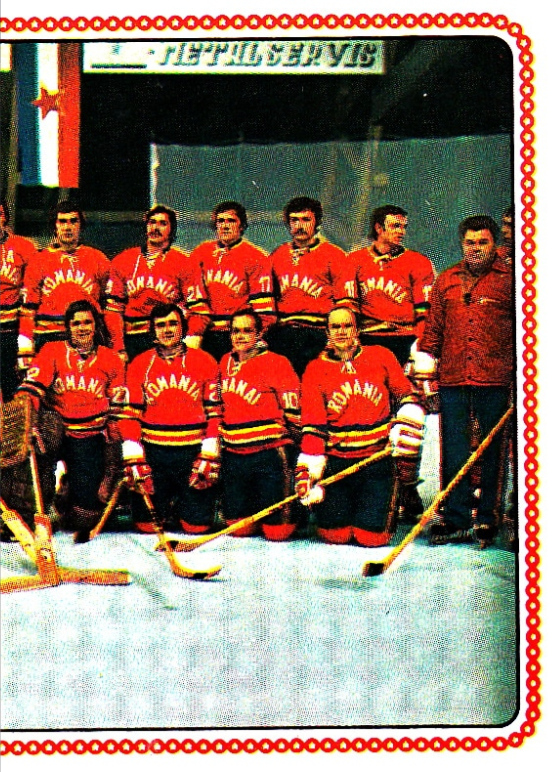

== All-time record ==
Updated as of 8 November 2025. Teams in italics are defunct.

Opponent	Played	Won	Drawn	Lost	GF	GA	GD
Australia	3	3	0	0	15	5	+10
Austria	29	14	2	13	104	130	–26
Belarus	1	0	0	1	3	5	–2
Belgium	15	15	0	0	133	24	+109
Bulgaria	40	34	2	4	249	91	+158
Canada	4	0	0	4	3	29	–26
China	24	19	2	3	137	69	+68
Croatia	13	7	1	5	52	41	+11
Czechoslovakia	8	0	0	8	6	78	–72
Denmark	20	10	1	9	80	75	+5
East Germany	43	4	2	37	91	264	–173
Estonia	12	5	0	7	50	43	+7
Finland	4	1	1	2	16	27	–11
France	28	12	4	12	139	114	+25
Germany	21	4	0	17	57	100	–43
Great Britain	27	4	1	22	64	140	–76
Hungary	69	40	5	24	292	240	+52
Iceland	5	4	0	1	25	10	+15
Ireland	2	2	0	0	43	1	+42
Israel	4	4	0	0	55	2	+53
Italy	29	11	3	15	93	127	–34
Japan	32	12	2	18	116	145	–29
Kazakhstan	6	2	0	4	11	30	–19
Kyrgyzstan	1	1	0	0	18	2	+16
Latvia	8	2	0	6	7	49	–42
Lithuania	17	8	1	8	57	61	–4
Mexico	1	1	0	0	19	0	+19
Netherlands	29	13	2	14	113	93	+20
North Korea	6	6	0	0	51	14	+37
Norway	31	13	3	15	112	134	–22
New Zealand	2	2	0	0	66	2	+64
Poland	63	7	5	51	107	394	–287
Serbia	5	5	0	0	28	6	+22
Serbia and Montenegro	6	6	0	0	47	11	+36
Slovakia	7	1	1	5	7	53	–46
Slovenia	9	0	0	9	7	54	–47
South Africa	2	2	0	0	33	3	+30
South Korea	12	6	0	6	56	41	+15
Soviet Union	1	0	0	1	1	18	–17
Spain	10	10	0	0	86	12	+74
Sweden	5	0	1	4	4	35	–31
Switzerland	38	13	3	22	121	187	–66
Ukraine	24	4	0	20	25	129	–104
United States	11	1	0	10	21	85	–64
Yugoslavia	58	30	15	13	254	208	+46
Total	784	338	57	389	3 073	3 377	–304

== See also ==
- List of Olympic men's ice hockey players for Romania
